= List of contemporary ethnic groups of Africa =

List of African ethnic groups

The following is a list of contemporary ethnic groups of Africa. There has been constant debate over the classification of ethnic groups. Membership of an ethnic group tends to be associated with shared ancestry, history, homeland, language or dialect and cultural heritage; where the term "culture" specifically includes aspects such as religion, mythology and ritual, cuisine, dressing (clothing) style, and other factors.

By the nature of the concept, ethnic groups tend to be divided into subgroups, may themselves be or not be identified as independent ethnic groups depending on the source consulted.

Africa here is considered to be approximately delimited from South America by the South Atlantic Ocean; from Asia by the Red Sea, Suez Canal, and Gulf of Aden; and from Europe by the Mediterranean Sea, Strait of Sicily, and Strait of Gibraltar.

== Ethnic groups ==
The following groups are commonly identified as "ethnic groups", as opposed to ethno-linguistic phyla, national groups, racial groups or similar.

Ethnicity	Language(s)	Primary homeland	Subgroups, tribes & castes	Religion(s)
Abagusii	Atlantic–Congo → Bantu → Gusii	Kenya (Kisii County, Nyamira County, Kericho County, Bomet County)	Abagetutu, Abanyaribari, Abagirango, Abanchari, Abamachoge, Ababasi	Christianity, traditional African religions
Acholi	Nilotic → Luo → Acholi	South Sudan, Uganda (Acholiland)	Agago, Amuru, Gulu, Kitgum, Lamwo, Nwoya, Pader, Omoro	Christianity, Islam
Adara	Niger–Congo → Plateau → Adara	Nigeria (Benue State, Kaduna State)		Christianity, Islam, traditional African religions
Adjoukrou	Niger–Congo → Kwa → Adjukru	Ivory Coast (Dabou)	Akradio, Agneby, Armébé, Gbougbo, Vieil-Aklodj, Débrimou, Lopou, Tiaha, Kpass, Orbaff, Bonn, Kaka, Kpanda, Mopoyem, Cosrou, Dabouly, Abraniamienbro, Bodou, Bouboury, Agbaille, Yassap, Vieux-Badien, Youhouli, N'gatty, Toupah	Christianity
Afar	Afroasiatic → Cushitic → Afar	Djibouti, Eritrea, Ethiopia (Afaria)	Asaimara, Adoimara	Islam, Early Cushitic
Afemai	Atlantic–Congo → Edoid → Afenmai	Nigeria (Edo State)	Agenebode, Weppa, Oshiolo, Emokwemhe Iviagbapue, Auchi, Ihievbe, Afuze, Warrake, Iviukwe, South Ibie, Agbede, Sabongida Ora, Igarra, Ekperi, Jattu, Fugar, Aviele, Okpella, Uneme Ehrunrun, Uneme Osu, Iviukhua, Ososo, Uzanu, Uzebba, Iviukhua, Weppa, Okpella, Okpekpe, Somorika	Christianity
Afrikaners	Indo-European → Germanic → Dutch → Afrikaans	South Africa, Namibia, Zambia, Botswana, Eswatini	Afrikaner-Jews, Boers (including Trekboers and Voortrekkers), Cape Dutch, Black Afrikaners, along with significant populations in Zimbabwe	Christianity → Catholicism, Protestantism → Calvinism; Irreligion → Agnosticism, Atheism; Judaism
Agaw	Afroasiatic → Cushitic → Agaw (Note: Language family; with some exceptions, all speakers of the various languages within this family are typically seen as one singular ethnicity.)	Ethiopia, Eritrea (Note: Non-contiguous homeland. Throughout most of its history (if not its entire history), this ethnic group has lived in separate, isolated communities scattered throughout the countries/subdivisions listed.)	Bilen, Ximre, Awi, Qemant	Christianity → Oriental Orthodoxy → Ethiopian Orthodoxy
Aja	Niger–Congo → Kwa → Adja	Benin, Togo		West African Vodun
Aka	Niger–Congo → Bantu → Aka	Central African Republic, Republic of the Congo		Traditional Aka religion
Akans	Niger–Congo → Kwa → Central Tano, (Note: Although Akan is the principal language of the Akan people, the Akan language has only recently been standardized. The majority of Akan people still speak their local dialects, which are usually considered by linguists to be separate languages altogether.) Avikam–Alladian, Potou, Abé, Abidji, Attie, Ega; Francosign → American Sign → Ghanaian Sign; Adamorobe Sign, Nanabin Sign	Ghana (Gold Coast) (Note: Due to historical migrations, about half of the Akan population reside in Ivory Coast.)	Abbé, Abidji, Ahafo, Ahanta, Akuapem, Akwamu, Akyem, Alladian, Anyi, Ashanti, Assin, Attie, Avikam, Baoulé, Bonos, Chakosi, Egas, Evalue, Fante, M'Bato, Nzema, Sefwi (including House of Israel), Tchaman, Wasa	Christianity
Akie	Nilo-Saharan → Nilotic → Akie; Maasai	Tanzania (Manyara Region)		Traditional Akie religion
Alur	Nilo-Saharan → Nilotic → Alur	Uganda (West Nile sub-region), Democratic Republic of the Congo (Ituri Province)		Christianity
Amaros	Indo-European → Romance → Portuguese	Nigeria		Christianity → Roman Catholicism
Amba	Niger–Congo → Bantu → Amba	Uganda (Bundibugyo District), Democratic Republic of the Congo (Ituri Province)		Christianity, Traditional African religion
Ambundu	Niger–Congo → Bantu → Kimbundu	Angola		Christianity, Traditional African religions
Amdang	Furan → Amdang	Sudan (West Darfur), Chad (Wadi Fira)		Islam
Americo-Liberians	Indo-European → Germanic → English → Standard Liberian English; Indo-European → English → Merico, Liberian Kreyol	Liberia		Christianity → Protestantism
Amhara	Afroasiatic → West Semitic → Amharic	Ethiopia (Amharia)		Christianity → Oriental Orthodoxy → Ethiopian Orthodoxy
Anglo-Africans	Indo-European → Germanic → English → South African English, Zimbabwean English	South Africa, Zimbabwe, Saint Helena, Ascension and Tristan da Cunha	Anglo-South Africans (with diaspora in the United Kingdom, Australia, New Zealand, Canada, and the United States); Anglo-Zimbabweans (with diaspora in the United Kingdom); Saint Helenians	Christianity
Anuak	Nilo-Saharan → Nilotic → Anuak	Ethiopia (Anuakia), South Sudan (Boma)		Christianity
Arabs	Afroasiatic → West Semitic → Arabic; Arab Sign, Sudanese sign languages	North Africa	Bedouins (including Beni Ades), Egyptian Arabs (including Upper Egyptian Arabs), Maghrebi Arabs (including the Sahrawis), Dawada, Sudanese Arabs, Arab Christians (including Alexandrians), Rashaida, Baggara Arabs (including Shuweihat), Abbala Arabs, Azawagh Arabs, Diffa Arabs, Manga Arabs, Ababda, Arab-Berbers	Islam → Sunni Islam Judaism → Sephardic Maghrebi; Christianity → Eastern Orthodoxy → Greek Orthodoxy → Greek Orthodox Church of Alexandria; Christianity → Catholicism → Melkite Catholicism
Argobba	Afroasiatic → West → Argobba (Note: The Argobba have typically been a merchant community and usually trades with other ethnic groups; recently, these factors have resulted in the majority only speaking Amharic or Oromo.)	Ethiopia (Afar, Harari, Amhara, and Oromia Regions)		Islam → Sunni Islam
Atyap	Niger–Congo → Plateau → Tyap	Nigeria (Kaduna State)		Christianity, Abwoi
Babur and Bura	Afroasiatic → Chadic → Bura	Nigeria (Borno State and Adamawa State)	Babur, Bura	Islam
Bagirmi	Nilo-Saharan → Central Sudanic → Bongo-Bagirmi → Bagirmi	Chad (Chari-Baguirmi)		Islam → Folk Islam
Bajju	Niger–Congo → Plateau → Jju	Nigeria (Middle Belt)		Christianity, Abwoi
Bajuni	Atlantic–Congo → Bantu → Swahili → Bajuni	Somalia (Bajuni Islands), Kenya (Coast Province)		Islam → Sunnism → Shafi'ism
Bakossi	Niger–Congo → Bantu → Akoose	Cameroon (Bakossi Mountains)		Christianity → Catholicism
Beidanes	Afroasiatic → West Semitic → Hassaniya Arabic	Mauritania		Islam → Sunni Islam
Bakulu	Niger–Congo → Plateau → Kulu	Nigeria (Kaduna State)		Christianity, Islam, Traditional African religion
Balanta	Niger–Congo → West Atlantic → Balanta	Guinea-Bissau, Senegal, The Gambia		Traditional African religions
Balondo-ba-Konja	Niger–Congo → Bantu → Londo	Cameroon		Creationism → Balondo-ba-Konja religion
Bambara	Niger–Congo → Mande → Manding → Bambara	Mali		Islam
Bamileke	Niger–Congo → Grassfields → Bamileke	Cameroon (West and Northwest regions)	Mengaka, Ngiemboon, Ngombale, Ngomba, Ngwe, Yemba, Fe'fe', Ghomala', Kwaʼ, Nda'nda', Medumba	Christianity
Bamum	Niger–Congo → Grassfields → Bamum	Cameroon (West Region)		Islam
Banda	Niger–Congo → Ubangian → Banda	Central African Republic, South Sudan, Democratic Republic of the Congo	Central Banda, South Banda, West Banda	Christianity
Bangweulu Twa	Niger–Congo → Bantu → Bemba	Zambia (Bangweulu Wetlands)		Traditional African Religion
Bari	Nilo-Saharan → Nilotic → Bari	South Sudan (Central Equatoria), Uganda	Pojulu, Kakwa, Nyangwara, Mandari, Kuku, other Karo tribes	Christianity, Traditional African religion, Islam → Sunni Islam (minority religion among some Kakwa bordering Uganda)
Bariba	Niger–Congo → Gur → Bariba	Borgu (Benin, Nigeria)		Islam
Bassa	Niger–Congo → Kru → Bassa	Liberia (Bassaland)		Christianity → Protestantism → Anglicanism
Basters	Indo-European → Germanic → Dutch → Afrikaans	Namibia (Rehoboth)		Christianity → Protestantism
Batwa	Niger–Congo → Bantu → Kirundi; Niger–Congo → Bantu → Kiga	African Great Lakes		Traditional African religion
Beja	Afroasiatic → Cushitic → Beja	Sudan, Egypt, Eritrea	Bishari, Hadendoa, Hedareb, Amarar, Beni-Amer	Islam → Sunni Islam
Bemba	Niger–Congo → Bantu → Bemba	Zambia (Northern, Luapula, and Copperbelt Provinces), Democratic Republic of the Congo (Katanga Province)		Christianity → Protestantism
Bembe	Niger–Congo → Bantu → Bembe	Democratic Republic of the Congo, Tanzania		Christianity → Protestantism, Traditional African religions
Bena	Niger–Congo → Bantu → Bena	Tanzania (Njombe Region)		Christianity → Catholicism
Berom	Niger–Congo → Plateau → Berom	Niger (Plateau State)		Christianity
Berta	Nilo-Saharan → Berta	Ethiopia (Benishangul-Gumuz Region), South Sudan		Islam
Beti (Note: The Beti and the Fang form the Beti-Pahuin peoples. While the term Beti is sometimes used interchangeably to refer to the Beti-Pahuin people, the Beti ethnicity is specifically limited to Ewondo and Eton speakers.)	Niger–Congo → Bantu → Ewondo, Eton	Cameroon	Ewondo, Eton	Christianity
Bissa	Niger–Congo → Mande → Bissa	Burkina Faso		Islam
Boa	Niger–Congo → Bantu → Boa	Democratic Republic of the Congo (Bas-Uele)		Christianity
Bobo	Niger–Congo → Mande → Bobo	Burkina Faso, Mali		Traditional African religions
Bolewa	Afroasiatic → Chadic → Bole	Nigeria (Gombe State)		Islam
Bondei	Niger–Congo → Bantu → Bondei	Tanzania (Pangani District)		Islam, Traditional African religions
Bozo	Niger–Congo → Mande → Bozo	Mali		Islam
Bubi	Niger–Congo → Bantu → Bube	Equatorial Guinea (Bioko)		Christianity → Catholicism
Budu	Niger–Congo → Bantu → Budu	Democratic Republic of the Congo (Wamba Territory)		Christianity
Buduma	Afroasiatic → Chadic → Yedina	Lake Chad (Chad, Nigeria, Cameroon)		Islam
Bwa	Niger–Congo → Gur → Bwa	Burkina Faso, Mali		Traditional African religions
Bwatiye	Afroasiatic → Chadic → Bacama	Nigeria (Adamawa State)		Christianity, Neo-Pentecostalism
Cafres	Indo-European → French → Réunion Creole	Réunion		Christianity
Cape Malays	Indo-European → Germanic → Dutch → Afrikaans; Indo-European → Germanic → English → South African English; Historically Indo-European → Germanic → Dutch → Arabic Afrikaans; Austronesian → Malayo-Polynesian → Malay, Makassarese	South Africa (Western Cape)		Islam
Chaga	Niger–Congo → Bantu → Chaga	Tanzania	Gwenos, Rombos, Central Chaga (including Kahe), Rusa, West Chaga	Christianity, Islam, Traditional African religions
Chagossians	Indo-European → French → Chagossian Creole	Chagos Archipelago (Note: Due to the Expulsion of the Chagossians, there are no Chagossians living on the Chagos Archipelago. The majority of Chagossians now live in the United Kingdom, Mauritius, and Seychelles.)		Christianity, Rastafari
Chaoui	Afroasiatic → Berber → Shawiya	Algeria (Aurès)		Islam → Sunnism
Chenouas	Afroasiatic → Berber → Shenwa	Algeria (Mount Chenoua)		Islam → Sunnism
Chewa	Niger–Congo → Bantu → Chewa	Malawi, Zambia, Zimbabwe, Mozambique		Christianity, Traditional African religions
Chinois	Indo-European → French → Réunion Creole; Sino-Tibetan → Sinitic → Hakka, Cantonese	Réunion		Christianity → Catholicism; Buddhism → Mahayana Buddhism
Chokwe	Niger–Congo → Bantu → Chokwe	Angola, Democratic Republic of the Congo, Zambia		Christianity
Coloureds	Indo-European → Germanic → English, Dutch → Afrikaans, Kaaps	South Africa (Western Cape)	Cape Coloureds (South Africa)	Christianity
Comorians	Niger–Congo → Bantu → Comorian	Comoros, France (Mayotte)	Grande Comorians, Anjouans, Mohélians, Maorais, Significant population in Metropolitan France	Islam → Sunnism
Dagaaba	Niger–Congo → Gur → Dagaare	Ghana, Burkina Faso		Christianity, Traditional African religions
Dagombas	Niger–Congo → Gur → Dagbani	Ghana (Kingdom of Dagbon)		Islam → Sunnism
Damara	Khoe → Khoekhoe	Namibia (Damaraland)		Christianity
Dinka	Nilo-Saharan → Nilotic → Dinka	South Sudan		Christianity, Dinka religion
Dogon	Niger–Congo → Dogon; Bangime, Tebul Sign	Mali (Bandiagara Escarpment)	Ampari Dogon (including Nyamboli), Tebul U, Mombo Dogon, Escarpment Dogon (including Tommo So), Jamsai Dogon, Nanga Dogon, Yanda Dogon, Walo, Beente, Duleri Dogon, Pinia, Bondum Dogon, Dogul Dogon, Budu, Western Plains Dogon, Toro-tegu Dogon, Bangande	Traditional African religions
Dwe'e	Niger–Congo → Bantu → Nzime	Cameroon		Christianity
Dyula	Niger–Congo → Mande → Manding → Dyula	Burkina Faso, Ivory Coast, Mali		Islam → Sunnism
Ebira	Niger–Congo → Nupoid → Ebira	Nigeria (Kogi State)		Islam
Edo	Niger–Congo → Edoid → Edo	Nigeria (Edo State)	Ika, Emai	Christianity
Efik	Niger–Congo → Cross River → Efik	Nigeria (Cross River State)		Christianity, Efik religion
Egyptians	Afroasiatic → Semitic → Egyptian Arabic; Egyptian Sign; Historically Afroasiatic → Egyptian (Note: The original Egyptian language, which morphed into the Coptic language around the 1st century AD, died out as a spoken language around the 17th century and is now only used for religious ceremonies in the form of Coptic. Today, the Egyptians, including the Copts, speak Egyptian Arabic.)	Egypt, Sudan, Libya	Copts, Sa'idi people	Islam → Sunni Islam; Christianity → Oriental Orthodoxy → Coptic Orthodoxy; Christianity → Catholicism → Eastern Catholicism → Coptic Catholicism
Ekoi	Niger–Congo → Bantoid → Jagham	Nigeria, Cameroon		Christianity, Ekoi religion
Embu	Niger-Congo ~ Bantu ~ Embu	Kenya (Eastern Province)		Christianity
Esan	Niger–Congo → Edoid → Esan	Nigeria (Esanland)		Christianity
Ewe	Niger–Congo → Kwa → Ewe, Waci, Kpessi	Togo, Ghana	Agave, Agome, Anlo, Avenor, Waci	Christianity, West African Vodun
Fang	Niger–Congo → Bantu → Fang	Equatorial Guinea (Rio Muni), Gabon		Christianity
Fipa	Niger–Congo → Bantu (Zone M) → Fipa; Niger–Congo → Bantu → Mambwe-Lungu	Rukwa Region, Tanzania (Sumbawanga Rural District, Nkasi District)		Christianity → Catholicism
Fon	Niger–Congo → Kwa → Gbe → Fon	Benin (Dahomey)		Christianity → Catholicism, West African Vodun
Franco-Mauritians	Indo-European → French → Mauritian Creole	Mauritius		Christianity → Catholicism
Franco-Seychellois	Indo-European → French → Seychellois Creole	Seychelles		Christianity → Catholicism
Frantsay	Indo-European → Romance → French	Madagascar		Christianity → Catholicism, Christianity → Protestantism
Fula	Atlantic–Congo → Senegambian → Fula	West Africa (Guinea, Senegal, Mali, Mauritania, Nigeria, Cameroon, Niger, Burkina Faso, Benin, Chad) (Note: This ethnic group is largely a nomadic or semi-nomadic one and do not have a particular area to claim as a primary homeland; these countries are listed here due to having a significant population.)	Wodaabe, Maasina Fulfulde, Sierra Leonean Fula, Toucouleur	Islam
Fur	Furan → Fur	Sudan (Darfur)		Islam → Sunni Islam
Ga-Adangbe	Niger–Congo → Kwa → Ga–Dangme	Greater Accra (Ghana)	Ga, Adangbe	Christianity
Gade	Niger–Congo → Nupoid → Gade	Nigeria (Niger State)		Gobo
Ganda	Niger–Congo → Bantu → Great Lakes → Luganda	Uganda (Buganda)		Christianity
Gbagyi	Niger–Congo → Nupoid → Gwari	Nigeria		Traditional African religions
Gbaya	Niger–Congo → Ubangian → Gbaya	Central African Republic, Cameroon	Bokoto, Kara, Buli (including Toongo), Ali, Mandja, Gbaya-Bossangoa, Bozom, Mbodomo, Gbanu, Bangandu	Islam
Gedeo	Afroasiatic → Cushitic → Gedeo	Ethiopia (Gedeo)		Christianity → Protestantism → P'ent'ay
Ghomaras	Afroasiatic → Berber → Ghomara	Morocco (Western Rif)		Islam → Sunni Islam
Gnawas	Afroasiatic → West Semitic → Moroccan Arabic	Morocco		Islam and Animism → Sufism and Animism → Gnawa religion
Goffal	Indo-European → Germanic → English → Zimbabwean English	Zimbabwe		Christianity
Gogo	Niger–Congo → Bantu → Gogo	Tanzania (Dodoma Region)		Christianity, African Traditional Religion
Gola	Niger–Congo → Gola	Liberia, Sierra Leone		Islam
Gosha	Niger-Congo → Bantu → Zigula → Mushunguli; Afroasiatic → Cushitic → Maay Maay	Somalia		Islam
Greeks	Indo-European → Hellenic; Afroasiatic → Arabic → Egyptian Arabic; Francosign → French Sign and American Sign → Greek Sign	Egypt	Egyptian Greeks (including Alexandrian Greeks), along with significant populations in the Democratic Republic of the Congo, Ethiopia, South Africa, Sudan, South Sudan, and Zimbabwe	Christianity → Eastern Orthodoxy, Catholicism → Greek Byzantine Catholicism, historically Hellenism, Neoplatonism, Greco-Roman Mysteries
Griquas	Indo-European → Germanic → Dutch → Afrikaans	South Africa (Griqualand)		Christianity → Protestantism → Calvinism
Guang	Niger–Congo → Kwa → Guang	Ghana (Brong-Ahafo and Volta Regions)	Gonja, Kyode, Cherepon, Efutu, Anyanga, Larteh, Chumburung, Krache, Anum-Boso	Christianity
Gumuz	Bʼaga languages	Ethiopia (Benishangul-Gumuz Region)		Traditional African religion
Gungu	Niger–Congo → Bantu → Gungu	Uganda (Buliisa District)		Christianity, Traditional African religion
Gurage	Afroasiatic → West Semitic → Gurage historically Afroasiatic → West Semitic → Mesmes	Ethiopia (Guragia)	Kistane, Zay, Inor, Mesqan, Muher Sebat Bet (including Chaha)	Christianity
Gurma	Niger–Congo → Gur → Gourmanche	Gurmaland (Burkina Faso, Ghana)	Ntcham, Bimoba	Islam
Gurunsi	Niger–Congo → Gur → Gurunsi	Burkina Faso, Ghana, Togo	Lukpa, Kabye, Tem, Lamba, Delo, Bago-Kusuntu, Chala, Lyele, Nuna, Kalamse, Pana, Winye, Deg, Puguli, Paasaal, Sisaala, Chakali, Siti, Tamprusi, Vagla	Traditional African religions, Islam → Sunni Islam
Ha	Niger–Congo → Bantu → Ha	Tanzania (Kigoma Region)		Animism
Hadiya	Afroasiatic → Cushitic → Hadiyya	Ethiopia (Hadiya)		Islam
Hadza	Hadza language	Tanzania (Karatu District)		Hadza mythology
Ham	Niger–Congo → Plateau → Hyam	Nigeria (Kaduna State)		Christianity, Abwoi
Hangaza	Niger–Congo → Bantu → Hangaza	Tanzania (Kagera Region)		Christianity
Harari	Afroasiatic → West Semitic → Harari	Ethiopia (Hararia)		Islam → Sunni Islam
Haratins	Afroasiatic → West Semitic → Maghrebi Arabic; Afroasiatic → Berber	Mauritania		Islam → Sunni Islam
Hausa	Afroasiatic → Chadic → Hausa	Hausaland (Niger, Nigeria, Ghana)		Islam → Sunni Islam
Haya	Niger–Congo → Bantu → Haya	Tanzania (Kagera Region)		Christianity, Ruhanga
Hawwara	Afroasiatic → Berber, Semitic → Arabic	Libya, Egypt, Sudan, Algeria and Morocco		Islam → Sunni Islam
Hehe	Niger–Congo → Bantu → Hehe	Tanzania (Iringa Region)		Christianity
Herero	Niger–Congo → Bantu → Herero	Namibia (Hereroland), Angola	OvaHimba, Ovambanderu	Christianity
Hutu (Note: Due to the history of intermingling and intermarrying of Hutu and Tutsi, some ethnographers and historians believe that the Hutu and Tutsi cannot be called distinct ethnic groups.)	Niger–Congo → Bantu → Rwanda-Rundi (Note: Refers specifically to the Kinyarwanda and Kirundi dialects. The other speakers of the dialects within the Rwanda-Rundi continuum are considered to be separate from the Hutu, Tutsi, and Twa peoples.)	Rwanda, Burundi, Democratic Republic of the Congo (Kivu)		Christianity
Ibibio	Niger–Congo → Cross River → Ibibio, Anaang, Eket, Oron	Nigeria (Akwa Ibom State)	Eket, Anaang, Oron	Christianity
Idoma	Niger–Congo → Idomoid → Idoma	Nigeria (Benue State)	Agatu, Alago, Yala	Christianity
Igala	Niger-Congo → Igala → Igala	Nigeria (AneIgala)	Ayangba, Igalamela, Ogugu, Akpanya, Ebu	Christianity, Islam
Igbo	Niger–Congo → Igbo	Nigeria (Igboland) , Equatorial Guinea	Anioma, Aro, Edda, Ekpeye, Etche, Ezaa, Ika, Ikwerre, Ikwo, Isu, Izzi, Mbaise, Mgbo, Ngwa, Nri-Igbo, Ogba, Ohafia, Ohuhu, Onitsha-Ado, Ukwuani, Waawa	Christianity, Odinala
Igdalen	Songhay → Northern Songhay → Tagdal	Niger, Mali, Algeria		Islam → Sunni Islam
Igede	Niger–Congo → Idomoid → Igede	Nigeria (Benue State)		Christianity
Ijaw	Niger–Congo → Ijaw	Nigeria (Rivers, Bayelsa, and Delta States)	Bille, Engenni, Ibani, Kalabari, Kula, Nkoro, Nkoroo, Obolo	Christianity
Imraguen	Afroasiatic → Arabic → Hassaniya Arabic → Imraguen	Mauritania, Western Sahara		Islam → Sunni Islam
Indo-Mauritians	Indo-European → French → Mauritian Creole	Mauritius	Bihari Mauritians, Tamil Mauritians	Hinduism, Islam
Indo-Seychellois	Indo-European → French → Seychellois Creole	Seychelles		Hinduism, Islam, Christianity, Jainism
Indo-South Africans	Indo-European → Germanic → English → South African English	South Africa		Hinduism, Islam, Sikhism, Jainism
Iraqw	Afroasiatic → Cushitic → Iraqw	Tanzania		Christianity
Isoko	Niger–Congo → Edoid → Isoko	Nigeria (Isoko region)		Christianity
Jerba	Afroasiatic → Berber → Nafusi	Tunisia		Islam → Sunni Islam
Jews	Afroasiatic → Canaanite → Hebrew → Modern Hebrew, (Note: Despite the successful revival of the Hebrew language, many Jews continue to speak the various languages that have developed by the diaspora populations, including Yiddish, Ladino, and Judeo-Arabic. In addition, English serves as the lingua franca of Israel.) Jewish languages, (Note: Though many Jewish languages are not genetically related to each other, they are all known to be ethnolects developed by the Jewish diaspora.) DGSic → Israeli Sign	North Africa (Morocco, Algeria, Tunisia, Libya, and Egypt) East Africa	Sephardim (including Moroccan Jews, Egyptian Sephardim, North African Sephardim, Maroka'im, Algerian Jews, Tunisian Jews, Libyan Jews, Berber Jews (including Mozabite Jews), Beta Israel (including Beta Abraham and Falash Mura), Rusape Jews, Abayudaya, Igbo Jews, as well as historically some Aksumites, along with significant populations in South Africa (including Afrikaner-Jews), Namibia, and Zimbabwe	Judaism
Jita	Atlantic–Congo → Bantu → Suguti	Tanzania (Mara Region)		Christianity, Ethnic Religion
Jola	Atlantic–Congo → Senegambian → Jola	Senegal (Jolaland)	Banjaal, Bayot, Gusilay, Fogni, Karon, Kasa, Kuwaataay, Mlomp	Traditional African religions
Jukun	Niger–Congo → Jukun Takum (Note: The Wapan language have largely replaced Jukun Takum as the main language.)	Nigeria (Wukari)	Wannu	Traditional African religions
Jur	Nilotic → Luo → Jur	South Sudan	Beli, Sopi, Mödö, Nyamusa, Wira, Biti, Morokodo	Christianity, Traditional African religions
Kabyle	Afroasiatic → Berber → Kabyle	Algeria (Kabylia)		Islam → Sunni Islam
Kafwe Twa	Niger–Congo → Bantu → Tonga	Zambia (Kafue Flats)		Traditional African religion
Kaguru	Niger–Congo → Bantu → Kagulu	Tanzania (Ukaguru Mountains)		Folk religion
Kalanga	Niger–Congo → Bantu → Kalanga	Zimbabwe, Botswana	Nambya	Christianity
Kalenjin	Nilo-Saharan → Nilotic → Kalenjin	Kenya (Rift Valley Province)	Keiyo, Tugen, Marakwet, Nandi, Kipsigis, Sabaot, Pokoot, Terik	Christianity
Kamba	Niger–Congo → Bantu → Kamba	Kenya (Ukambani)		Christianity
Kanuri	Nilo-Saharan → Saharan → Kanuri	Kanuriland (Nigeria, Niger, Chad, Cameroon)	Kanembu, Yerwa Kanuri	Islam
Kapsiki	Afroasiatic → Chadic → Kapsiki	Mandara Mountains (Nigeria, Cameroon)		Islam
Karai-Karai	Afroasiatic → Chadic → Karai-Karai	Nigeria (Bauchi State, Gombe State, Yobe State and Jigawa State)		Islam, Christianity
Karamojong	Nilo-Saharan → Nilotic → Karamojong	Uganda		Christianity, Traditional African religion
Karana	Indo-European → Indo-Aryan → Gujarati, Hindustani, Kutchi, Sindhi; Dravidian → Tamil, Telugu	Madagascar		Islam
Kassena	Atlantic–Congo → Gur → Kasena	Ghana (Kassena-Nankana), Burkina Faso		Kassena religion
Kavango	Atlantic–Congo → Bantu → Kavango	Namibia	Kwangali, Mbunza, Shambyu, Gciriku, Mbukushu	Christianity, Traditional African religions
Kerewe	Atlantic–Congo → Bantu → Kerewe	Tanzania (Ukerewe Island)		Christianity, Traditional African religions
Khassonké	Mande → Manding → Kassonke	Mali (Kayes Region)		Islam
Kiga	Atlantic–Congo → Bantu → Kiga	Uganda, Rwanda		Christianity → Catholicism, Christianity → Protestantism
Kikuyu	Atlantic–Congo → Bantu → Kikuyu	Kenya (Central Province)		Christianity
Kilba	Afroasiatic → Chadic → Huba	Nigeria (Hong)		Christianity
Kinga	Niger–Congo → Bantu → Kinga	Tanzania (Kipengere Range)		Christianity, Traditional African religion
Kissi	Atlantic–Congo → Mel → Kissi	Guinea, Sierra Leone		Christianity
Kofyar	Afroasiatic → Chadic → Kofyar	Nigeria (Plateau State)		Traditional African religions
Kongo	Atlantic–Congo] → Bantu → Kongo	Kongoland (Democratic Republic of the Congo, Republic of the Congo, Angola)	Lari, Vili, Yombe, Suundi, Dondo, Hangala, Kugni, Manyanga, Beembe	Christianity, Kongo religion
Konjo	Atlantic–Congo → Bantu → Konjo	Rwenzori Mountains (Democratic Republic of the Congo, Uganda)	Nande	Christianity
Konkomba	Atlantic–Congo → Gur → Konkomba	Ghana, Togo		Traditional African religions, Christianity
Kono	Mande → Vai–Kono → Kono	Sierra Leone (Kono District)		Christianity, Islam, Traditional African religion
Konso	Afroasiatic → Cushitic → Konso	Ethiopia (Konso)		Traditional African religions
Kpelle	Mande → Southwestern Mande → Kpelle	Liberia, Guinea		Traditional African religions
Kposo	Niger–Congo → Kwa → Ghana–Togo Mountain → Kposo	Togo (Plateaux), Ghana		Christianity → Catholicism
Kru	Kru languages	Liberia (Grand Kru and Maryland Counties)	Aizi, Bete, Bakwe, Grebo, Krahn (including Sapo), Kuwaa	Christianity
Kunama	Nilo-Saharan → Kunama	Eritrea, Ethiopia		Christianity → Oriental Orthodoxy → Ethiopian Orthodoxy
Kuria	Niger–Congo → Bantu → Kuria	Kenya, Tanzania		Traditional African religions, Christianity
Kuteb	Niger–Congo → Jukunoid → Kuteb	Nigeria (Taraba State)		Christianity
Kwaya	Niger–Congo → Bantu → Kwaya	Tanzania (Mara Region)		Christianity, Traditional African religion
Kwere	Niger–Congo → Bantu → Kwere	Tanzania (Bagamoyo District)		Islam, Traditional African religion
Lega	Niger–Congo → Bantu → Lega	Democratic Republic of the Congo		Traditional African religions
Lemba	Niger–Congo → Bantu → Venda, Shona	Zimbabwe, South Africa, Malawi, Mozambique		Christianity, Islam, Judaism
Limba	Niger–Congo → Limba	Sierra Leone (Bombali and Koinadugu Districts)		Christianity
Lisi	Nilo-Saharan → Central Sudanic → Naba	Chad (Lake Fitri)	Bilala, Kuka and the Medogo	Islam
Lozi	Niger–Congo → Bantu → Lozi	Zambia (Barotseland), Zimbabwe, Namibia (Zambezi Region), Botswana	Mafwe, Mbukushu, Totela, Yeyi	Christianity, Traditional African religions
Luba	Niger–Congo → Bantu → Luban	Democratic Republic of the Congo (Lubaland)	Luba-Kasai, Luba-Katanga, Hemba (including Bangubangu), Songe, Lulua	Christianity
Lugbara	Nilo-Saharan → Central Sudanic → Lugbara	Democratic Republic of the Congo (Orientale Province), South Sudan, Uganda (West Nile (particularly Arua City, Arua, Maracha, Terego, Madi-Okollo, Yumbe and Koboko districts))	Ayivu, Maracha, Terego, Vurra, Aringa	Christianity, Islam, Lugbara religion
Luhya	Niger–Congo → Bantu → Luhya	Kenya (Western Province)	Bukusu, Idakho, Isukha, Kabras, Khayo, Kisa, Marachi, Maragoli, Marama, Nyole, Samia, Tachoni, Tiriki, Tsotso, Wanga,	Christianity
Luo	Nilo-Saharan → Nilotic → Dholuo	Kenya		Christianity
Luso-Africans	Indo-European → Romance → Portuguese → African Portuguese	PALOP countries (Angola, Guinea-Bissau, Cape Verde, Mozambique, São Tomé and Príncipe, Equatorial Guinea), South Africa	Portuguese Africans (including Luso-Angolans, Cape Verdeans, Luso-Equatoguineans, Luso-Guineans, Luso-Mozambicans, Santomeans, Luso-South Africans)	Christianity → Catholicism
Maasai	Nilo-Saharan → Nilotic → Maasai	Maasailand (Tanzania, Kenya)	Samburu, Arusha, Kwavi	Traditional African religions
Madi	Nilo-Saharan → Central Sudanic → Ma'di	Democratic Republic of the Congo, South Sudan, Uganda		Christianity
Mafa	Afroasiatic → Chadic → Mafa	Cameroon, Nigeria		Christianity
Majang	Nilo-Saharan → Surmic → Majang	Ethiopia (Gambela Region)		Christianity, Traditional African religion
Makaa	Niger–Congo → Bantu → Makaa, Niger–Congo → Bantu → Byep	Cameroon (East Region, Centre Region)	South Makaa, North Makaa	Christianity, Traditional African religion
Makonde	Niger–Congo → Bantu → Makonde	Tanzania, Mozambique (Mueda Plateau)	Machinga	Islam
Makua	Niger–Congo → Bantu → Makhuwa	Mozambique	Lomwe, Chuwabu, Moniga, Koti, Nathembo	Traditional African religions
Malagasy	Austronesian → Greater Barito → Malagasy	Madagascar, Comoros, Mayotte, Réunion, Mauritius	Merina, Sihanaka, Betsileo, Zafimaniry, Antaifasy, Antemoro, Antaisaka, Antambahoaka, Tandroy, Antankarana, Antanosy, Bara, Betsimisaraka, Bezanozano, Mahafaly, Makoa, Mikea, Sakalava, Tanala, Tsimihety, Vezo	Christianity, Malagasy religion
Malbars	Indo-European → French → Réunion Creole; Historically Indo-European → Romance → French	Réunion		Hinduism
Mambila	Niger–Congo → Mambila	Mambilla Plateau (Nigeria, Cameroon)	Somyev	Traditional African religions
Mandinka	Niger–Congo → Mande → Manding	Mali, The Gambia, Guinea, Senegal	Bolon	Islam
Manjak	Niger–Congo → West Atlantic → Senegambian → Manjak	Guinea-Bissau, Senegal		Traditional African religions
Masa	Afroasiatic → Chadic → Masana	Cameroon, Chad		Christianity, Islam
Masalit	Nilo-Saharan → Masalit	Sudan, Chad		Islam → Sunni Islam
Mauritian Creoles	Indo-European → French- → Mauritian Creole	Mauritius		Christianity → Catholicism, Rastafari
Mbaka	Niger–Congo → Ubangian → Mbaka	Central African Republic, Democratic Republic of the Congo		Christianity → Catholicism
Mbugu	Niger–Congo → Bantu → Mbugu, Pare; Niger–Congo and Afroasiatic → Bantu and Cushitic → Maʼa	Tanzania (Usambara Mountains)		Christianity, Islam, Traditional African religion
Mende	Niger–Congo → Mande → Mende	Sierra Leone (Southern and Eastern Provinces)		Islam
Mijikenda	Niger–Congo → Bantu → Mijikenda	Kenya (Coast Province)	Chonyi, Giriama, Digo, Segeju, Rabai	Christianity
Mongo	Niger–Congo → Bantu → Mongo	Democratic Republic of the Congo (Equateur, Tshuapa, Mongala, Nord-Ubangi, Sud-Ubangi)	Bolia, Ntomba, Ngando, Iyaelima, Mbole, Mpama, Nkutu, Sengele, Hendo, Dengese, Tetela	Christianity
Moru	Nilo-Saharan → Central Sudanic → Moru	South Sudan (Western Equatoria)	Miza, Ägyi, Moroändri, Kediro, 'Bari'ba	Christianity → Protestantism → Anglicanism → Episcopal Church of the South Sudan
Mossi	Niger–Congo → Gur → Mossi	Burkina Faso (Mossiland)		Islam
Mozabite	Afroasiatic → Berber → Mozabite; Afroasiatic → West Semitic → Algerian Arabic	Algeria		Islam → Sunni Islam
Mumuye	Niger–Congo → Adamawa → Mumuye	Nigeria (Taraba State)		Traditional African religions
Musgum	Afroasiatic → Chadic → Musgu	Cameroon (Far North Region), Chad (Chari-Baguirmi, Mayo-Kebbi Est)		Islam
Mwera	Niger–Congo → Bantu → Mwera	Tanzania (Mtwara and Ruvuma Regions)		Islam
Nama	Khoe → Khoekhoe	Namibia (Namaland), South Africa	Oorlams	Christianity
Nara	Nilo-Saharan → Eastern Sudanic → Nara	Eritrea	Higir, Mogareb, Koyta, Santora	Islam, Animism
Ndendeule	Niger-Congo languages → Bantu languages → Ndendeule	Tanzania		Animism
Ngbandi	Niger–Congo → Ubangian → Ngbandi	Democratic Republic of the Congo, Central African Republic	Yakoma	Christianity
Ngoni	Niger–Congo → Bantu → Ngoni	Malawi, Mozambique, Tanzania, Zimbabwe, and Zambia		Christianity, African Traditional Religion, Sangoma, Islam
Nkole	Niger–Congo → Bantu → Nkore-Kiga → Nkore	Uganda (Ankole)		Christianity, Ruhanga
Northern Ndebele	Niger–Congo → Bantu → Nguni → Northern Ndebele	Zimbabwe (Matabeleland)		Christianity, Traditional African religions
Nubians	Nilo-Saharan → Nubian	Nubia (Egypt, Sudan)	Nobiin, Mattokki, Dongolawi, Midob, Birgid, Hill Nubians (including Dilling, Debri, Ghulfan, Kadaru, Karko, and Wali)	Islam → Sunni Islam
Nubis	Afroasiatic → Arabic → Nubi	Uganda, Kenya	Ugandan Nubis, Kenyan Nubis	Islam
Nuer	Nilo-Saharan → Nilotic → Nuer	South Sudan (Nuerland)		Traditional African religions
Nupe	Niger–Congo → Nupoid → Nupe	Nigeria (Niger State, Kwara State)		Islam, Christianity, Traditional African religions
Nyambo	Niger–Congo → Bantu → Nyambo	Tanzania (Karagwe District, Kagera Region)		Christianity → Protestantism → Evangelicalism
Nyoro	Niger–Congo → Bantu → Nyoro	Uganda (Bunyoro)		Christianity, Islam, Traditional African religion
Ogiek	Nilo-Saharan → Nilotic → Ogiek	Kenya (Mau Forest, Mount Elgon)		Christianity, Traditional Ogiek religion
Ogoni	Niger–Congo → Cross River → Ogoni	Nigeria (Ogoniland)	Baan, Eleme, Gokana, Tẹẹ	Christianity
Ogu	Niger–Congo → Kwa → Gbe → Gun	Nigeria (Lagos, Ogun State), Benin		Christianity, Islam, West African Vodun
Oku	Indo-European → English → Krio; Indo-European → Germanic → English → Sierra Leonean English	Sierra Leone, The Gambia		Islam
Oromo	Afroasiatic → Cushitic → Oromo	Ethiopia (Oromia), Kenya	Boorana, Barento, Salale, Machaa, Arsi, Wollo	Islam → Sunni Islam
Ovambo	Niger–Congo → Bantu → Ovambo	Namibia (Ovamboland), Angola		Christianity → Protestantism → Lutheranism
Ovimbundu	Niger–Congo → Bantu → Umbundu	Angola		Christianity
Papel	Niger–Congo → Senegambian → Papel	Guinea-Bissau (Biombo Region)		Christianity → Catholicism
Pare	Niger–Congo → Bantu → Pare	Tanzania (Pare Mountains)		Islam
Pedi	Niger–Congo → Bantu → Northern Sotho → Sepedi	South Africa (Limpopo)		Christianity
Pende	Niger–Congo → Bantu → Pende	Democratic Republic of the Congo		Christianity
Rendille	Afroasiatic → Cushitic → Rendille	Kenya (Eastern Province)		Waaq
Riffians	Afroasiatic → Berber → Tarifit	Morocco		Islam → Sunnism
Saho	Afroasiatic → Cushitic → Saho	Eritrea, Ethiopia		Islam → Sunnism
Sandawe	Sandawe	Tanzania (Chemba District)		Traditional African Religion, Islam
Sara	Nilo-Saharan → Central Sudanic → Sara	Chad, Central African Republic	Ngambay, Doba, Laka, Kabba, Sar, Mbay, Ngam, Dagba, Gulay	Traditional African religions
Senufo	Atlantic–Congo → (disputed) → Senufo	Mali, Ivory Coast, Burkina Faso	Nafana, Minyanka	Traditional African religions
Serer	Atlantic–Congo → Senegambian → Serer, Cangin	Senegal	Laalaa, Ndut, Niominka, Serer-Noon, Palor, Saafi	Islam, Serer religion
Seychellois Creoles	Indo-European → French → Seychellois Creole	Seychelles		Christianity → Catholicism
Sherbro	Atlantic–Congo → Mel → Sherbro	Sierra Leone (Sherbro Island)		Traditional African religions
Shi	Niger–Congo → Bantu → Great Lakes →Mashi	Democratic Republic of the Congo	Havu, Bahavu, Nyindu, Banyindu, Fuliru, Bafuliru	Christianity → Catholic Church, Kubandwa
Shilha	Afroasiatic → Berber → Shilha	Morocco		Islam → Sunnism
Shilluk	Nilo-Saharan → Nilotic → Shilluk	South Sudan	Gule	Christianity → Catholicism
Shona	Niger–Congo → Bantu → Shona	Zimbabwe (Mashonaland)	Manyika, Ndau	Christianity
Sidama	Afroasiatic → Cushitic → Sidaama	Ethiopia (Sidamia)		Christianity
Sierra Leone Creoles	Indo-European → English → Krio, Pichinglis	Sierra Leone	Gambian Creoles, Saros, Krio Fernandinos, with significant populations in the United States	Christianity
Siltʼe	Afroasiatic → West Semitic → Siltʼe	Ethiopia (Siltia)		Islam
Sino-Mauritians	Indo-European → French → Mauritian Creole; Sino-Tibetan → Sinitic → Hakka, Cantonese	Mauritius		Christianity, Chinese folk religion, Buddhism
Sino-Seychellois	Indo-European → French → Seychellois Creole; Sino-Tibetan → Sinitic → Hakka, Cantonese	Seychelles		Christianity, Chinese folk religion, Buddhism
Sinoa	Sino-Tibetan → Sinitic → Cantonese, Mandarin	Madagascar		Christianity → Catholicism
Siwi	Afroasiatic → Berber → Siwi	Egypt, Libya		Islam → Sunni Islam
Soga	Niger–Congo → Bantu → Soga	Uganda (Busoga)		Christianity, Traditional African religions
Somalis	Afroasiatic → Cushitic → Somali	Greater Somalia (Somalia, Ethiopia, Djibouti, Kenya)	Hawiye, Darod (including Majeerteen), Isaaq, Dir, Rahanweyn, Madhiban, Yibir, Ajuran along with significant populations in the United States, the United Kingdom, Sweden, and Canada	Islam → Sunnism → Shafi'ism
Songhai	Songhay languages	West Africa	Songhai proper, Zarma, Wogo, Kurtey, Ingalkoyyu, Arma, Belbali, Dendi	Islam
Soninke	Niger–Congo → Mande → Soninke	Mali		Islam → Sunni Islam → Malikism
Soqotris	Afroasiatic → West Semitic → Soqotri	Yemen (Socotra)		Islam
Sotho	Niger–Congo → Bantu → Sotho	South Africa (Free State), Lesotho		Christianity
Southern Ndebele	Niger–Congo → Bantu → Nguni → Southern Ndebele	South Africa (Mpumalanga, Gauteng, Limpopo)		Christianity, Traditional African religions
Spaniards	Indo-European → Romance → Spanish → Canarian Spanish, Silbo Gomero, Isleño Spanish	Spain (the Canary Islands, Ceuta, Melilla) and northern Morocco (Andalusian-Arabs)		Christianity → Catholicism
Sukuma	Niger–Congo → Bantu → Sukuma	Tanzania		Christianity → Catholicism
Surma	Nilo-Saharan → Surmic	Ethiopia, South Sudan	Me'en, Mursi, Kichepo	Traditional African religions
Susu	Niger–Congo → Mande → Susu	Guinea, Sierra Leone (Kambia)		Islam
Swahili	Niger–Congo → Bantu → Swahili	Swahili coast (Kenya, Tanzania, Mozambique, Comoros)	Shirazi (including Zanzibaris, and Maore)	Islam
Swazi	Niger–Congo → Bantu → Swazi	South Africa (Mpumalanga), Eswatini		Christianity → African Zionism
Tabom	Indo-European → Romance → Portuguese	Ghana		Christianity
Tallensi	Atlantic–Congo → Gur → Talni	Ghana (Tallensi Traditional Area), Burkina Faso		Tallensi religion
Tama	Nilo-Saharan → Taman → Tama	Chad, Sudan		Islam
Tarok	Niger–Congo → Plateau → Tarok	Nigeria (Plateau State)		Christianity
Teke	Niger–Congo → Bantu → Teke	Republic of the Congo, Democratic Republic of the Congo		Traditional African religions
Temne	Niger–Congo → Mel → Temne	Sierra Leone (Northern Sierra Leone)		Islam
Tigrayans	Afroasiatic → Ethiopic → Tigrinya	Eritrea (Eritrean Highlands), Ethiopia (Tigrayia)		Christianity → Oriental Orthodoxy → Ethiopian Orthodoxy
Tigre	Afroasiatic → Ethiopic → Tigre	Eritrea		Islam
Tiv	Niger–Congo → Tiv	Nigeria (Benue State)		Christianity
Tonga	Niger–Congo → Bantu → Tonga	Zambia, Zimbabwe		Traditional African Religion
Tooro	Niger–Congo → Bantu → Tooro	Uganda (Tooro Kingdom)	Abagweri, Abasingo, Abahinda, Ababiito, Abasumbi, Abayaga, Ababwiju, Abasiita, Abasambo, Ababoopi, Ababwooro, Abagaya, Abalebeki, Abango, Abagimu, Abarungu, Abanyakyoozi, Abasoigi	Christianity, Ruhanga
Toubou	Nilo-Saharan → Saharan → Tebu	Toubouland (Chad, Niger, Sudan, Libya)	Daza, Teda	Islam → Sunni Islam
Tsonga	Niger–Congo → Bantu → Tsonga	Mozambique (Maputo City and Maputo Province, Gaza Province), South Africa (Limpopo, Mpumalanga)		Christianity → Catholicism
Tswana	Niger–Congo → Bantu → Tswana	Botswana, South Africa (South Tswanaland)	Balete, Mangwato, Bangwaketse, Bakwena, Batlokwa, Bahurutshe, Bakgatla, Rolong	Christianity
Tuareg	Afroasiatic → Berber → Tuareg languages	Algeria, Burkina Faso, Niger, Nigeria, Mali, Mauritania		Islam → Sunni Islam
Tumbuka	Niger-Congo → Bantu → Tumbuka	Malawi, Zambia, Tanzania, Zimbabwe	Senga, Henga, Yombe, Phoka, Tonga	Christianity, Tumbuka mythology
Tupuri	Niger–Congo → Adamawa → Tupuri	Cameroon (Far North Region), Chad (Mayo-Kebbi)		Christianity
Turkana	Nilo-Saharan → Nilotic → Turkana	Kenya (Turkanaland)		Christianity → Catholicism
Tutsi (Note: Due to the history of intermingling and intermarrying of Hutu and Tutsi, some ethnographers and historians believe that the Hutu and Tutsi cannot be called distinct ethnic groups.)	Niger–Congo → Bantu → Great Lakes → Rwanda-Rundi	Rwanda, Burundi, Democratic Republic of the Congo (Kivu)	Banyamulenge	Christianity, Islam
Urhobos	Niger–Congo → Edoid → Urhobo	Nigeria (Delta State)		Christianity
Vai	Niger–Congo → Mande → Vai	Liberia, Sierra Leone		Islam, Christianity, Traditional African religions
Venda	Niger–Congo → Bantu → Tshivenda	South Africa (Vendaland)		Christianity, Traditional African religions
Wala	Niger–Congo → Gur → Wali	Ghana (Upper West Region)		Islam → Sunni Islam, Animism
Welayta	Afroasiatic → Omotic → Wolaitta	Ethiopia (Wolayitia)		Christianity → Protestantism → P'ent'ay
Wolane	Afroasiatic → Ethiopic → Wolane	Ethiopia (Gurage)		Islam
Wolof	Niger–Congo → Atlantic → Senegambian → Wolof	Senegambia (Senegal, The Gambia)	Lebu	Islam → Sunni Islam → Sufism → Mouride
Xhosa	Niger–Congo → Bantu → Nguni → Xhosa	South Africa (Xhosaland)	Fengu, Gcaleka, Gqunukhwebe, Gaika, Mpondomise, Thembu, Xesibe	Christianity
Yabs	Indo-European → French → Réunion Creole	Réunion		Christianity
Yako	Niger–Congo → Cross River → Yako	Nigeria (Yakurr Local Government)		Christianity
Yao	Niger–Congo → Bantu → Yao	Malawi, Mozambique, Tanzania (Ruvuma and Mtwara Regions)		Islam and Animism → Yao Folk Islam
Yoa-Lokpa	Niger–Congo → Gur → Oti–Volta → Yom, Niger–Congo → Gur → Gurunsi → Lukpa	Benin (Donga Department)		Ethnic religion
Yoruba	Atlantic–Congo → Yoruboid → Yoruba; Yoruba Sign	Yorubaland (Nigeria, Benin, Togo)	Ijesha, Egba, Yewa, Igbomina, Awori, Akoko, Okun, Ana, Ekiti, Ilaje, Ijebu, Oyo, Ondo, Ife, Nagos, with significant populations in the United States and Canada	Christianity, Islam, Yoruba religion
Zaghawa	Nilo-Saharan → Saharan → Zaghawa	Chad, Sudan		Islam → Sunni Islam
Zande (Note: Otherwise known as Azande.)	Niger–Congo → Zande	Democratic Republic of the Congo, Central African Republic, South Sudan	Barambu	Christianity
Zarabes	Indo-European → French → Réunion Creole; Indo-European → Indo-Aryan → Gujarati	Réunion		Islam
Zayanes	Afroasiatic → Berber → Central Atlas Tamazight	Morocco (Khenifra)		Islam → Sunni Islam
Zulu	Niger–Congo → Bantu → Nguni → Zulu	South Africa (KwaZulu-Natal)		Christianity
ǃKung	Kxʼa → ǃKung	Namibia (Kalahari Desert)	ǃXun, Ju	Animism
ǂAakhoe	Khoe-Kwadi → Khoe → Khoekhoe → ǂAakhoe	Namibia		Animism

== Lists of ethnic groups ==
By status:

- List of Indigenous peoples
- List of diasporas
- List of stateless nations

Regional lists:

- African people
  - Indigenous people of Africa
  - Ethnic groups in Algeria
  - Ethnic groups in Botswana
  - Ethnic groups in Burundi
  - Ethnic groups in Chad
  - List of ethno-linguistic groups in Eritrea
  - List of ethnic groups in Ethiopia
  - List of ethnic groups in Nigeria
    - List of ethnic groups in Rivers State
  - Ethnic groups in Rwanda
  - List of ethnic groups in Tanzania
  - Ethnic groups in Senegal
  - Ethnic groups in Sierra Leone
  - List of ethnic groups in South Sudan
  - List of ethnic groups in Zambia
- Asian people
  - List of contemporary ethnic groups of Asia
  - Ethnic groups in Northern Asia
    - List of ethnic groups in Russia
  - List of ethnic groups in East Asia
    - List of ethnic groups in China
    - List of ethnic groups in Japan
    - List of ethnic groups in North Korea
    - List of ethnic groups in South Korea
    - List of ethnic groups in Taiwan
      - List of indigenous peoples of Taiwan
  - South Asian ethnic groups
    - Ethnic groups in Nepal
    - Ethnic groups in Pakistan
      - Demographics of Sindh
  - Ethnic groups in Southeast Asia
    - Ethnic groups in Indonesia
    - List of ethnic groups in Laos
    - Ethnic groups in Malaysia
    - List of ethnic groups in Myanmar
    - Ethnic groups in the Philippines
    - List of ethnic groups in Vietnam
  - Ethnic groups in the Middle East
- European people
  - List of contemporary ethnic groups of Europe
  - Ethnic groups in Bosnia and Herzegovina
  - Peoples of the Caucasus
- Indigenous peoples of the Americas
  - List of contemporary ethnic groups of North America
  - List of contemporary ethnic groups of South America
  - Classification of indigenous peoples of the Americas
- Oceanian people
  - List of contemporary ethnic groups of Oceania
  - List of Indigenous Australian group names
  - List of Melanesian ethnic groups
    - List of New Guinean ethnic groups
  - List of Micronesian ethnic groups
  - List of Polynesian ethnic groups
- Ethnoreligious group
- Ethnic groups by country

== See also ==
- List of languages by number of native speakers
- List of language families
- Lists of people by nationality
- Lists of active separatist movements
- Uncontacted peoples
- Ethnic flag
- Race (human categorization)
- List of Y-chromosome haplogroups in populations of the world
