= Nigui-Assoko =

- Village
- Location in Ivory Coast
- Coordinates: 5°16′N 4°36′W
- Country: Ivory Coast
- District: Lagunes
- Region: Grands-Ponts
- Department: Dabou
- Sub-prefecture: Toupah
- Time zone: UTC+0 (GMT)

Nigui-Assoko is a village in southeastern Ivory Coast. It is in the sub-prefecture of Toupah, Dabou Department, Grands-Ponts Region, Lagunes District. The village sits on the north shore of Ébrié Lagoon.

Nigui-Assoko was a commune until March 2012, when it became one of 1,126 communes nationwide that were abolished.
