= Lahou-Kpandah =

Lahou-Kpandah Lahou-Kpanda; Ebobou
- Village
- Location in Ivory Coast
- Coordinates: 5°8′N 5°0′W
- Country: Ivory Coast
- District: Lagunes
- Region: Grands-Ponts
- Department: Grand-Lahou
- Sub-prefecture: Grand-Lahou
- Time zone: UTC+0 (GMT)

Lahou-Kpandah (also spelled Lahou-Kpanda, also known as Ebobou) is a coastal village in southern Ivory Coast. It is in the sub-prefecture of Grand-Lahou, Grand-Lahou Department, Grands-Ponts Region, Lagunes District. The village is just east of the town of Grand-Lahou, at the eastern end of the peninsula.

Lahou-Kpandah was a commune until March 2012, when it became one of 1,126 communes nationwide that were abolished.
