= Cosrou =

- Village
- Location in Ivory Coast
- Coordinates: 5°19′N 4°40′W
- Country: Ivory Coast
- District: Lagunes
- Region: Grands-Ponts
- Department: Dabou
- Sub-prefecture: Toupah
- Time zone: UTC+0 (GMT)

Cosrou is a coastal village in southern Ivory Coast. It is in the sub-prefecture of Toupah, Dabou Department, Grands-Ponts Region, Lagunes District. It lies on Cosrou Bay (Baie de Cosrou) and by road is located 33 kilometres (21 mi) west of Dabou and 79 kilometres (49 mi) west of Abidjan. The area is dominated by about 3,500 hectares of savanna and plantations.

Cosrou was a commune until March 2012, when it became one of 1,126 communes nationwide that were abolished. J. L. Tournier was chief of the commune (cercle) in the mid to late 1940s.
