= Tiéviéssou =

Tiéviéssou Tiébiéssou
- Village
- Location in Ivory Coast
- Coordinates: 5°21′N 4°53′W
- Country: Ivory Coast
- District: Lagunes
- Region: Grands-Ponts
- Department: Grand-Lahou
- Sub-prefecture: Ahouanou
- Time zone: UTC+0 (GMT)

Tiéviéssou (also spelled Tiébiéssou) is a village in southern Ivory Coast. It is in the sub-prefecture of Grand-Lahou, Grand-Lahou Department, Grands-Ponts Region, Lagunes District.

Tiéviéssou was a commune until March 2012, when it became one of 1,126 communes nationwide that were abolished.
