= Bouboury =

- Village
- Location in Ivory Coast
- Coordinates: 5°20′N 4°28′W
- Country: Ivory Coast
- District: Lagunes
- Region: Grands-Ponts
- Department: Dabou
- Sub-prefecture: Dabou
- Time zone: UTC+0 (GMT)

Bouboury is a village in the southern Ivory Coast. It is in the sub-prefecture of Dabou, Dabou Department, Grands-Ponts Region, Lagunes District.

Bouboury was a commune until March 2012, when it became one of 1,126 communes nationwide that were abolished.
