= Mapouka =

Ivorian music genre and dance style

Mapouka (or macouka,"la danse du fessier", or "the dance of the behind"), also known as Chura, or Baikoko in Southern Africa, is a modernized version of a traditional dance from the Dabou area of southeast Côte d'Ivoire originating from the Ahizi, Alladian, Dida and Avikam people; it is also especially popular in Tanzania. Mapouka entered the music scene in 1991 following the 1990s creation of zouglou music and the importation of foreign music genres such as dancehall and hip hop, and grew in popularity, especially among the youth.

The dance is mostly performed by women, shaking their rear end side to side, facing away from their audience, often while bent over. Some Ivorians have criticized Mapouka for allegedly "debasing the country's cultural heritage" and promoting depravity.

In March 1998, following complaints from citizens and women's rights groups, the government of Côte d'Ivoire banned Mapouka from public and television for being "sexually perverted, lewd and obscene". However, the prohibition was ended in 1999 after President Henri Konan Bédié was overthrown by Robert Guéï in a military coup. Following the prohibition of Mapouka in Côte d'Ivoire, the dance enjoyed a global following elsewhere in Francophone West and Central Africa, where it faced similar controversy and was outlawed or chased away by authorities in Togo, Burkina Faso, Niger, Benin in western Africa and Cameroon in central Africa.

The dance is similar to what is referred to in belly dance as "shimmies". The fundamental difference is that in belly dance it is performed while upright and facing the audience, whereas Mapouka is performed more often while bent over and facing away from the audience. The hip movements are, however, the same.

== See also ==
- Kwassa kwassa
- Logobi
- Twerking
- M'alayah
- Zouglou
