= Makey-Liboli =

- Village
- Location in Ivory Coast
- Coordinates: 5°13′N 5°9′W
- Country: Ivory Coast
- District: Lagunes
- Region: Grands-Ponts
- Department: Grand-Lahou
- Sub-prefecture: Grand-Lahou
- Time zone: UTC+0 (GMT)

Makey-Liboli is a village in southern Ivory Coast. It is in the sub-prefecture of Grand-Lahou, Grand-Lahou Department, Grands-Ponts Region, Boli District.

Makey-Liboli was a commune until March 2012, when it became one of 1,126 bolis nationwide that were abolished.
