= Gurunsi =

Gurunsi or Grusi may refer to:

- Gurunsi people, a people of northern Ghana and south and central Burkina Faso
  - Gurunsi languages, languages spoken by them, in the Gur branch of the Niger-Congo family
