= Ebonou =

Ebonou Obunu
- Town and sub-prefecture
- Location in Ivory Coast
- Coordinates: 5°7′N 5°21′W
- Country: Ivory Coast
- District: Lagunes
- Region: Grands-Ponts
- Department: Grand-Lahou

Population (2014)
  - Total: 25,314
- Time zone: UTC+0 (GMT)

Ebonou (also spelled Obunu) is a town in southern Ivory Coast. It is a sub-prefecture of Grand-Lahou Department in Grands-Ponts Region, Lagunes District. It is about 1.5 kilometres (one mile) north of the coast.

Ebonou was a commune until March 2012, when it became one of 1,126 communes nationwide that were abolished.

In 2014, the population of the sub-prefecture of Ebonou was 25,314.

== Villages ==
The 14 villages of the sub-prefecture of Ebonou and their population in 2014 are:

1. Adjadon (460)
2. Adjadon V2 (1,005)
3. Adjadon V3 (801)
4. Allekedon (377)
5. Badadon (955)
6. Beugredon (305)
7. Dibou (353)
8. Dokpodon (11,353)
9. Ebonou (2,833)
10. Essonam (338)
11. Gredjibery (214)
12. Kokou (1,628)
13. Krokrom (4,174)
14. Zagbalebe (518)
