= Gule =

Gule may refer to:

- Gule tribe, in northern Sudan
- Gule language, an extinct language of Sudan
- Lars Gule (born 1955), Norwegian philosopher

== See also ==
- The Raindrop (Turkish title: Güle Güle), a 2000 Turkish comedy-drama film
