= Bacanda =

- Town and sub-prefecture
- Location in Ivory Coast
- Coordinates: 5°38′N 4°53′W
- Country: Ivory Coast
- District: Lagunes
- Region: Grands-Ponts
- Department: Grand-Lahou

Population (2014)
  - Total: 20,950
- Time zone: UTC+0 (GMT)

Bacanda is a town in southern Ivory Coast. It is a sub-prefecture of Grand-Lahou Department in Grands-Ponts Region, Lagunes District.

Bacanda was a commune until March 2012, when it became one of 1,126 communes nationwide that were abolished.

In 2014, the population of the sub-prefecture of Bacanda was 20,950.

== Villages ==
The eight villages of the sub-prefecture of Bacanda and their population in 2014 are:

1. Adjekonankro (1,645)
2. Agnikro (1,088)
3. Bacanda (9,174)
4. Botindin (1,536)
5. Gbedjenou (2,314)
6. Godesso (2,513)
7. Siekro (1,776)
8. Tagbanasso (904)
