= Axel Konan =

Axel Konan may refer to:

- Axel Cédric Konan (born 1983), Ivorian footballer
- Axel Fabrice Konan (born 1997), Ivorian footballer
