= PNQ =

PNQ or pnq may refer to:

- Pacific Northwest Quarterly, a peer-reviewed academic journal of history that publishes scholarship relating to the Pacific Northwest of the United States
- Pana language (Gur), West Africa, by ISO 639-3 code
- Parti nationaliste du Québec, a defunct Canadian fringe Quebec-based federal political party
- Pune Airport, Maharashtra, India, by IATA airport code
- Punkunnam railway station, Kerala, India, by Indian Railways station code
