= Adjoukrou people =

Ethnic group and tribe of Ivory Coast

Adjoukrou
Total population
- 140,000 (2017)

Regions with significant populations
- Ivory Coast

Languages
- Adjoukrou, French

Religion
- Christianity (90%), ethnic religions (10%)

Related ethnic groups
- Other Atlantic–Congo-speaking peoples Especially Abbé and Abidji

The Adjoukrou people, also known as the Adyukru, Adioukrou, Adyoukrou, Ajukru, and the Bubari, are an ethnic group and tribe of the Ivory Coast indigenous to the Dabou area of the Grands-Ponts region of the country's Lagunes District.

== Demographics ==
The Adjoukrou people are considered a Sub-Saharan Peoples associated most closely with the Guinean people cluster of Central African ethnic groups. The Adjoukrou affiliate with the Lagoon culture group present in their region of the Ivory Coast.

According to Ethnologue, the Adjoukrou population numbered at around 140,000 in 2017. There is no indication that the Adjoukrou are significantly present outside of Ivory Coast.

Literacy rates among the Adjoukrou are estimated at between 30% and 60%.

=== Language ===
The Adjukru language, belongs to the Kwa languages group of languages.

=== Religion ===
The religious breakdown of the tribe is mainly Christian with a majority of 90% of Adjoukrou adhering to Christian of any type and 10% believing in indigenous ethnic religions of any type. The Christian population is broken down as follows with the majority of around 60% belonging to independent Christian churches, 30% Protestants of any type and 10% adhering to Catholicism. Around 3% of the Christian population adhere to Evangelicalism of any kind, likely a proportion of the independent Christian churches figure.

== See also ==
- Adjukru language
