= Pwo language =

Pwo language may refer to:

- Pwo Karen languages (Burma)
- Phuie language (Burkina)
