= Toukouzou =

- Town and sub-prefecture
- Location in Ivory Coast
- Coordinates: 5°9′N 4°48′W
- Country: Ivory Coast
- District: Lagunes
- Region: Grands-Ponts
- Department: Grand-Lahou

Population (2014)
  - Total: 2,562
- Time zone: UTC+0 (GMT)

Toukouzou is a coastal town in southern Ivory Coast. It is a sub-prefecture of Grand-Lahou Department in Grands-Ponts Region, Lagunes District.

Toukouzou was a commune until March 2012, when it became one of 1,126 communes nationwide that were abolished.

In 2014, the population of the sub-prefecture of Toukouzou was 2,562.

== Villages ==
The four villages of the sub-prefecture of Toukouzou and their population in 2014 are:

1. Amessan N'guessandon (301)
2. Djateket (335)
3. Noumouzou (430)
4. Toukouzou (1,496)
