= Agnero =

Agnero is a surname. Notable people with the surname include:

- Juvenal Agnero (born 1998), Ivorian footballer
- Yannick Agnero (born 2003) Ivorian footballer
