= Juvenal Agnero =

Ivorian footballer

Personal information
- Full name: Juvenal Junior Mel Agnero
- Date of birth: 29 December 1998 (age 27)
- Place of birth: Orbaff, Ivory Coast
- Height: 1.85 m (6 ft 1 in)
- Positions: Winger; striker

Team information
- Current team: Malcantone

Youth career
- 2010–2011: Insubria Calcio
- 2011–2017: A.C. Milan

Senior career*
Years	Team	Apps	(Gls)
2017	Picerno	6	(0)
2018	Sfintul Gheorghe	6	(0)
2018	Atlantis		
2020–2023	Rapid Lugano		
2023–	Malcantone		

International career
2017	Ivory Coast U20	4	(0)
- * Club domestic league appearances and goals as of 05:00, 30 July 2023 (UTC)

Juvenal Junior Mel Agnero (born 29 December 1998) is an Ivorian footballer who plays as a forward.

== Club career ==
Born in Orbaff in the Ivory Coast, Agnero moved to Italy as a child, playing for local side Insubria Calcio, whom he signed for in the 2010–2011 season, before being scouted and signed by professional club A.C. Milan at the age of twelve. Agnero progressed through the Milan academy, playing alongside future international players Gianluigi Donnarumma and Manuel Locatelli, also scoring in a 2–1 loss to Croatian opposition Dinamo Zagreb at Old Trafford in the final of the Nike Cup.

Having left Milan in 2017, Agnero dropped down to Serie D, signing with Picerno, but left the club in December of the same year. After a short spell with Moldovan side Sfintul Gheorghe, he spent time with Finnish side Atlantis, although despite appearing in the Kolmonen for the side, it appears to have been on a trial or non-contractual basis.

In January 2020, he moved to Switzerland, signing with semi-professional side Rapid Lugano. His career in Switzerland got off to a good start, and by October of the same year, he went on trial with Swedish Allsvenskan side Kalmar. After three years with Rapid Lugano, in which he finished second-top goal-scorer in his second season, he moved to fellow Swiss side AC Malcantone in February 2023.

== Style of play ==
A tall and fast forward, Agnero has stated that he prefers to play as a winger, but is also capable playing as a "number 9", a centre-forward. He lists fellow Ivorian Didier Drogba as an inspiration.

== Career statistics ==
=== Club ===
As of 8 December 2020.

Appearances and goals by club, season and competition
Club	Season	League			National Cup		League Cup		Other		Total	
Club	Season	Division	Apps	Goals	Apps	Goals	Apps	Goals	Apps	Goals	Apps	Goals
Picerno	2017–18	Serie D	6	0	0	0	1 (Note: Appearances in the Coppa Italia Serie D)	0	0	0	7	0
Sfintul Gheorghe	2018	Moldovan National Division	6	0	0	0	–		0	0	6	0
Career total			12	0	0	0	1	0	0	0	13	0
