= Dabou Airport =

Airport in Lagunes, Ivory Coast

- IATA: none; ICAO: DIDB

Summary
- Airport type: Public
- Serves: Dabou
- Elevation AMSL: 141 ft / 43 m
- Coordinates: 5°21′5″N 4°24′13″W

Map

Runways
Direction	Length		Surface
Direction	ft	m	Surface
01/19	3,216	980	Unpaved
- Source: Google Maps

Dabou Airport (ICAO: DIDB) is an airport serving Dabou, Côte d'Ivoire.

== See also ==
- Transport in Côte d'Ivoire
