= Nuni language =

Gur language continuum of Burkina Faso

Nuni
- Nunuma
- Region: Burkina Faso
- Ethnicity: Nuna
- Native speakers: (213,000 cited 1995–2000)
- Language family: Niger–Congo?: Atlantic–Congo; Gur; Southern; Gurunsi; Northern; Nuni

Language codes
- ISO 639-3: Either: nuv – Northern Nuni nnw – Southern Nuni
- Glottolog: nuni1253

Nuni is the Gur language continuum of the Nuna people of Burkina Faso. The northern and southern varieties are not mutually intelligible.
