= Axel Fabrice Konan =

Ivorian footballer

Axel Konan
Personal information
- Full name: Christ Axel Fabrice Konan
- Date of birth: 20 July 1997 (age 29)
- Place of birth: Ousrou, Ivory Coast
- Height: 1.70 m (5 ft 7 in)
- Position: Defender

Youth career
- 2015–2016: Moossou

Senior career*
Years	Team	Apps	(Gls)
2016–2017	Saxan Gagauz Yeri	35	(4)
2018	Gomel	6	(0)
2019	Kohtla-Järve JK Järve	22	(1)
- * Club domestic league appearances and goals as of 30 December 2019

Axel Fabrice Konan (born 20 July 1997) is an Ivorian professional footballer. In 2019, he played for Kohtla-Järve JK Järve.
