= Regina Yaou =

Regina Yaou (sometimes N'doufou) (10 July 1955 – 4 November 2017) was a writer from Ivory Coast.

== Life and career ==
Yaou was born in Dabou and raised by her aunt in a literary family, and wrote her first poems between the ages of twelve and fourteen. She attended the technical high school in Cocody, where in 1977 she participated in a literary contest organized by the publishing house Nouvelles éditions africaines; this led to the creation of her first work, a novella entitled La Citadine which has remained unpublished, but which won a prize in the contest. After leaving school she worked for a few years before returning to her studies in 1982; she attended the University of Tours and spent a year at the Université Félix Houphouët-Boigny in Cocody. She has also lived in Akrou, in the Jacqueville Department. She was declared a winner of literary competition organized by the new African edition in 1977

Yaou completed her first novel, Lezou Marie ou les écueils de la vie, in 1977, presenting it to an editor in 1981 and publishing it in 1982. She followed it with La révolte d'Affiba in 1985; she has since written numerous other novels. From 1991 until 1993 she was in the United States as a guest lecturer at a number of universities. She then returned to Ivory Coast, where in addition to her literary activities she held a number of other positions; in 2005 she returned to the United States once more, for two years of comparative study of the similarities between the stories of the southern United States and those of her home country. In 2009 she returned again to Ivory Coast.

Beginning in the 1990s, Yaou published a number of works under pseudonyms such as Joëlle Anskey and Ruth Owotchi. Her work generally focuses on themes of modern life and the role of women in Ivorian society, and includes discussion of domestic violence, infidelity, and maternity, among other issues. In 2014 she received the excellency award from the president of Cote d' Ivoire, and was the writer in the spotlight at the last international book fair at Abidjan.

She died on 4 November 2017.

== Works ==
=== As Regina Yaou ===
- 1977: La Citadine, unpublished.
- 1982: Lezou Marie ou les écueils de la vie. Abidjan, Nouvelles Éditions africaines
- 1985: La Révolte d’Affiba. Abidjan, Nouvelles Éditions africaines
- 1988: Aihui Anka. Abidjan, Nouvelles Éditions africaines (republished 1999)
- 1997: Le Prix de la Révolte. Abidjan, Nouvelles éditions ivoiriennes
- 1998: Les Germes de la mort. Tome 1: Brah la villageoise. Abidjan, Nouvelles éditions ivoiriennes
- 2001: L’indésirable. Abidjan, Centre d'édition et de diffusion africaines (CEDA)
- 2005: Le glas de l’infortune. Abidjan, Nouvelles éditions ivoiriennes-CEDA
- 2009: Coup d’État. Abidjan, Nouvelles éditions ivoiriennes
- 2010: Dans l’antre du loup. Abidjan, Les Classique Ivoiriens
- 2012: Opération fournaise. Abidjan, Nouvelles éditions ivoiriennes-CEDA

=== Pseudonymous ===
- 1999: Symphonie et Lumière. Adoras, Nouvelles éditions ivoiriennes
- 1999: Cœurs rebelles. Adoras, Nouvelles éditions ivoiriennes
- 2000: La fille du lagon. Adoras, Nouvelles éditions ivoiriennes
- 2001: Les miraculés. Adoras, Nouvelles éditions ivoiriennes
- 2004: Le Contrat. Clair de Lune, Puci
- 2004: Tendres ennemis. Clair de Lune, Puci
- 2004: L’amour en exil. Clair de Lune, Puci
- 2004: Piège pour un cœur. Clair de Lune, Puci
