= Aristide Bahin =

Ivorian footballer (born 1987)

Personal information
- Full name: Hamed Aristide Bahin
- Date of birth: 21 November 1987 (age 38)
- Place of birth: Dabou, Ivory Coast
- Height: 1.90 m (6 ft 3 in)
- Position: Striker

Senior career*
Years	Team	Apps	(Gls)
2005–2009	SC Adjamé		
2009	Bnei Sakhnin		
2010	Stade Tunisien		
2010–2011	Trofense	21	(3)
2011–2012	US Créteil	18	(3)
2012	CS Pétange	9	(2)
- * Club domestic league appearances and goals as of 14 November 2012

Aristide Bahin (born 21 November 1987 in Dabou) is an Ivorian footballer who plays as a forward. He played in the Portuguese Liga de Honra for Trofense.
