= Ahouanou =

- Town and sub-prefecture
- Location in Ivory Coast
- Coordinates: 5°30′N 4°51′W
- Country: Ivory Coast
- District: Lagunes
- Region: Grands-Ponts
- Department: Grand-Lahou

Area
  - Total: 463 km^{2} (179 sq mi)

Population (2021 census)
  - Total: 33,939
  - Density: 73.3/km^{2} (190/sq mi)
  - Town: 21,533
- (2014 census)
- Time zone: UTC+0 (GMT)

Ahouanou is a town in southern Ivory Coast. It is a sub-prefecture of Grand-Lahou Department in Grands-Ponts Region, Lagunes District.

Ahouanou was a commune until March 2012, when it became one of 1,126 communes nationwide that were abolished.

In 2021, the population of the sub-prefecture of Ahouanou was 33,939.

== Villages ==
The seven villages of the sub-prefecture of Ahouanou and their population in 2014 are:

1. Ahouanou (21,533)
2. Ahougnanfoutou (1,304)
3. Dongbo (2,214)
4. Nianda (2,641)
5. Palmindustrie Tamabo Nord (1,296)
6. Palmindustrie Tamabo Sud (2,698)
7. Tamabo Village (3,318)
