= Grand-Lahou =

- Town, sub-prefecture, and commune
- Location in Ivory Coast
- Coordinates: 5°8′N 5°1′W
- Country: Ivory Coast
- District: Lagunes
- Region: Grands-Ponts
- Department: Grand-Lahou

Area
  - Total: 1,100 km^{2} (420 sq mi)

Population (2021 census)
  - Total: 77,479
  - Density: 70/km^{2} (180/sq mi)
  - Town: 28,470
- (2014 census)
- Time zone: UTC+0 (GMT)

Grand-Lahou [gʁɑ̃.la.u] is a coastal town in southern Ivory Coast. It is a sub-prefecture of and the seat of Grand-Lahou Department in Grands-Ponts Region, Lagunes District. Grand-Lahou is also a commune.

Grand-Lahou is situated at the mouth of the Bandama River on the Gulf of Guinea. It was occupied by the British, Germans and Dutch before the French, from 1890 onward, began to develop it as a trading port. It is located near the Assagny National Park.

In 2021, the population of the sub-prefecture of Grand-Lahou was 77,479.

== Villages ==
The twenty villages of the sub-prefecture of Grand-Lahou and their population in 2014 are:

1. Ahouniansou (1,390)
2. Betesso (969)
3. Braffedon (3,587)
4. Djidjikro (4,393)
5. Grand-Lahou (28,470)
6. Groguida (1,063)
7. Groguida V1 (2,858)
8. Katchekan (323)
9. Katchekpli (726)
10. Lahou-Kpanda (2,127)
11. Liboli (1,885)
12. Likpilassie (632)
13. Mackey (2,103)
14. N'zida-Zoukouboli (350)
15. Nandibo 1 (1,396)
16. Nandibo 2 (3,012)
17. Palmci Dioulabougou (1,097)
18. Palmci Yocoboue (1,746)
19. Tiéviéssou (7,450)
20. Tieviessou Phci (1,906)
