= W with hook =

Latin letter W with hook

Latin W with hook

The letter Ⱳ (minuscule: ⱳ), called W with hook, is a letter of the Latin script based on the letter W. It is used in the orthographies of languages in Burkina Faso: the Puguli language and the Lobiri language.

The majuscule and the minuscule are located at U+2C72 and U+2C73 in Unicode, respectively.

== See also ==
- Ꝡ ꝡ: Ligature VY
