= Yoruba Canadians =

Total population
- 16,210 (2016 Canadian Census)

Regions with significant populations
- Ontario, Alberta, Quebec, British Columbia

Languages
- Canadian English, Canadian French, Yoruba

Religion
- Islam, Christianity, Yoruba religion

Related ethnic groups
- Yoruba people, Nigerian Canadians, Black Canadians, Yoruba Americans, Nigerian Americans, Beninese Americans, African Americans

Yoruba Canadians are Canadians of Yoruba descent. The Yoruba people are an ethnic group of southwestern Nigeria and southern Benin in West Africa. They represent the second largest ethnic community of Nigerians in Canada. According to the 2016 Canadian census by Statistics Canada, 16,210 respondents spoke Yoruba at home ranking it as one of the most spoken Niger-Congo language in the country. Many are descendants of African American slaves while recent migrants come directly from West Africa.

== Notable Yoruba-Canadians ==
- Thomas Peters
- Jarome Iginla
- Bunmi Banjo
- Foluke Akinradewo
- Fikayo Tomori
- Tesho Akindele
- Demi Orimoloye

== See also ==
- Yoruba Americans
- Nigerian Canadians
