= Nkoro tribe =

Ethnic group, Nigeria

The Nkoro tribe' of the Ijaw people lives in southeastern Rivers State, Nigeria. Nkoro settlements include: Nkoro, Ayama, Dema, The cultural traditions have been influenced by its proximity to the Andoni, the Bonny. The Nkoro dialect is a dialect of the Ijaw language.

One section of Nkoro town, Afakani, speaks an entirely different dialect from the rest of the clan. The clan sometimes refers to itself as Kala-Kirika ("Little Okrika"), reflecting the widely held belief that the clan was established by migrants from Okrika. Historically, the Nkoro waged war with the Ogoni. Eventually, a truce was negotiated and a market was established at Inyaba where the Nkoro could exchange fish for Ogoni farm goods. Wars were also fought against the Bonny and Andoni tribes.

Nkoro clan also exist in Eniong Abatim in Odukpani Local Government Area of Cross River State. As one of the four groups that made up Eniong Abatim Efik Eburutu, the other three being Babom, Beme and Bukong.

== Nkoro as a person name ==
Also the word "Nkoro" is being used as a name and found among the Nta-Nsle Clan Community in Ikom L.G.A in the Northern part of the Cross River State of Nigeria. The name "Nkoro" literally means "strong or strength' 'i.e. someone to be strong or having strength in doing something". But adding the suffix "Nkoro-isi" means literally "strong Head", the 'isi' there means 'head' which ordinarily means "stubborn-head' or someone who is 'stubborn".
