= Shuweihat tribe =

Ethnic minority in Chad and Sudan

Shuweihat
Regions with significant populations
- Sudan, Chad

Languages
- Sudanese Arabic

Shuweihat are the members of an ethnic minority in Chad and Sudan, which belongs to the Ja'alin tribal confederation. Most of them are Sunni Muslims. They are considered closely related to the Bedayria tribe. They speak the Sudanese dialect of the Arabic language.
