= Delo language =

Gur language of Ghana and Togo

Deloo
- Deloo/Ntrubo
- Region: Ghana, Togo
- Ethnicity: Deloo/Ntrubo
- Native speakers: 18,000 (2003-2012)
- Language family: Niger–Congo?: Atlantic–Congo; Gur; Southern; Gurunsi; Eastern; Deloo

Language codes
- ISO 639-3: ntr
- Glottolog: delo1240

Deloo, or Ntrubo, is a Gur language of Ghana and Togo.
