= Lyélé language =

Gur language of Burkina Faso

Lyélé
- Lele
- Region: Burkina Faso
- Native speakers: 210,000 (2009)
- Language family: Niger–Congo?: Atlantic–Congo; Gur; Southern; Gurunsi; Northern; Lyélé

Language codes
- ISO 639-3: lee
- Glottolog: lyel1241

The Lyélé language (Lele) is spoken in the Sanguié Province of Burkina Faso by approximately 130,000 people known as Lyéla, Léla, Gourounsi or Gurunsi. It is spoken in the towns of Réo, Kyon, Tenado, Dassa, Didyr, Godyr, Kordié, Pouni and Zawara. The language is also sometimes known by the wider term Gurunsi.

Syntactically, Lyélé is a SVO language with postpositions. Determiners and adjectives are placed after the noun.

Unlike most other languages, Lyélé has only one paradigm for all pronouns, including demonstratives, interrogatives, and relatives. Tone can sometimes differentiate between an interrogative and a demonstrative, but this may be a result of interrogative intonation rather than tone marked on the word itself.

== Writing system ==
Lyélé alphabet.
| a | b | c | d | e | ə | ɛ | f | g | h | i | j | k | l | ly | m | n | ŋw | ny | o | ɔ | p | r | rh | s | sh | t | u | v | w | y | z | zh |

The nasalization is indicated with the tilde on the vowel nasalized ⟨ã, ẽ, ɛ̃, ĩ, õ, ɔ̃, ũ⟩.

Tones are indicated using accents, except for the midtone :

- grave accent for low tone;
- the acute accent for the high tone;
- caron for rising tone;
- the circumflex accent for the falling tone.
