= Jerba people =

Human population in Tunisia

Jerba
Total population
- 15,000

Regions with significant populations
- Tunisia – Djerba

Languages
- Nafusi

Religion
- Muslim

Related ethnic groups
- Other Berbers

The Amazigh of Jerba identify as Berbers. As a result, their culture is starkly different from mainstream Tunisian society. The island of Jerba has distinct Ibadi Berber culture.
