= Evalue people =

Ethnic group in Ghana and Ivory Coast

The Evalue people are an Akan people who live in southwestern Ghana and across the border in Ivory Coast.
