= Kalamsé language =

Gur language spoken in West Africa

Kalamsé
- Sàmòmá
- Region: Burkina Faso, Mali
- Native speakers: (12,000 cited 1985 & 2009 censuses)
- Language family: Niger–Congo?: Atlantic–Congo; Gur; Southern; Gurunsi; Northern; Kalamsé

Language codes
- ISO 639-3: knz
- Glottolog: kala1383
- ELP: Kalamsé

- Person: Kalenga
- People: Kalemse

Kalamsé, or Sàmòmá, is a Gur language of Burkina Faso and Mali.
