= Nuna people =

Ethnic group in West Africa

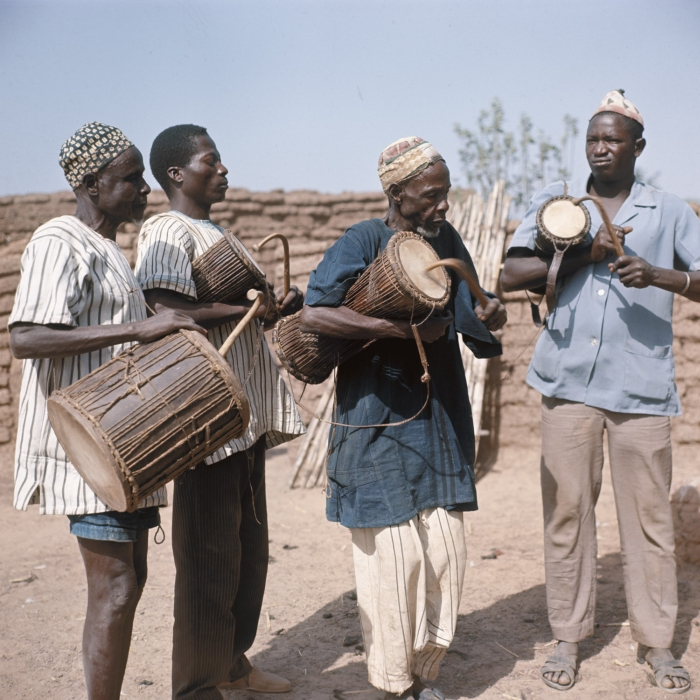
Nunuma musicians (1970s)

The Nuna people, or Nunuma, are subgroup of the Gurunsi people in Southern Burkina Faso, estimated 150,000 population, and Ghana. The Nuna are known for their masks. The group speaks the Nuni language.

== Culture ==
Nuna art is distinguished in particular by its very colorful masks - red, white and black - statuettes in clay and wood, stools and jewels, generally destined to honor the ancestors.

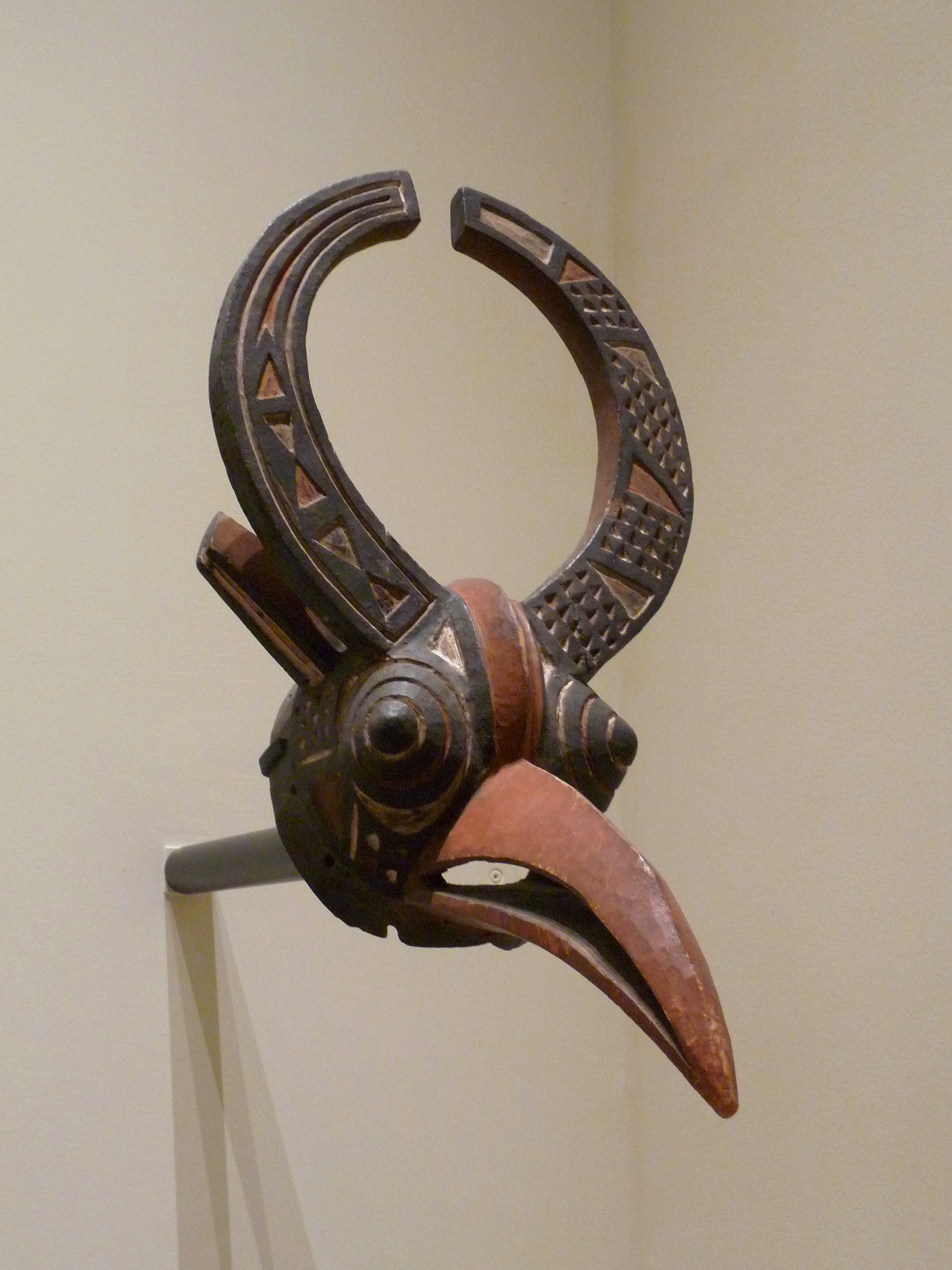
Bird mask

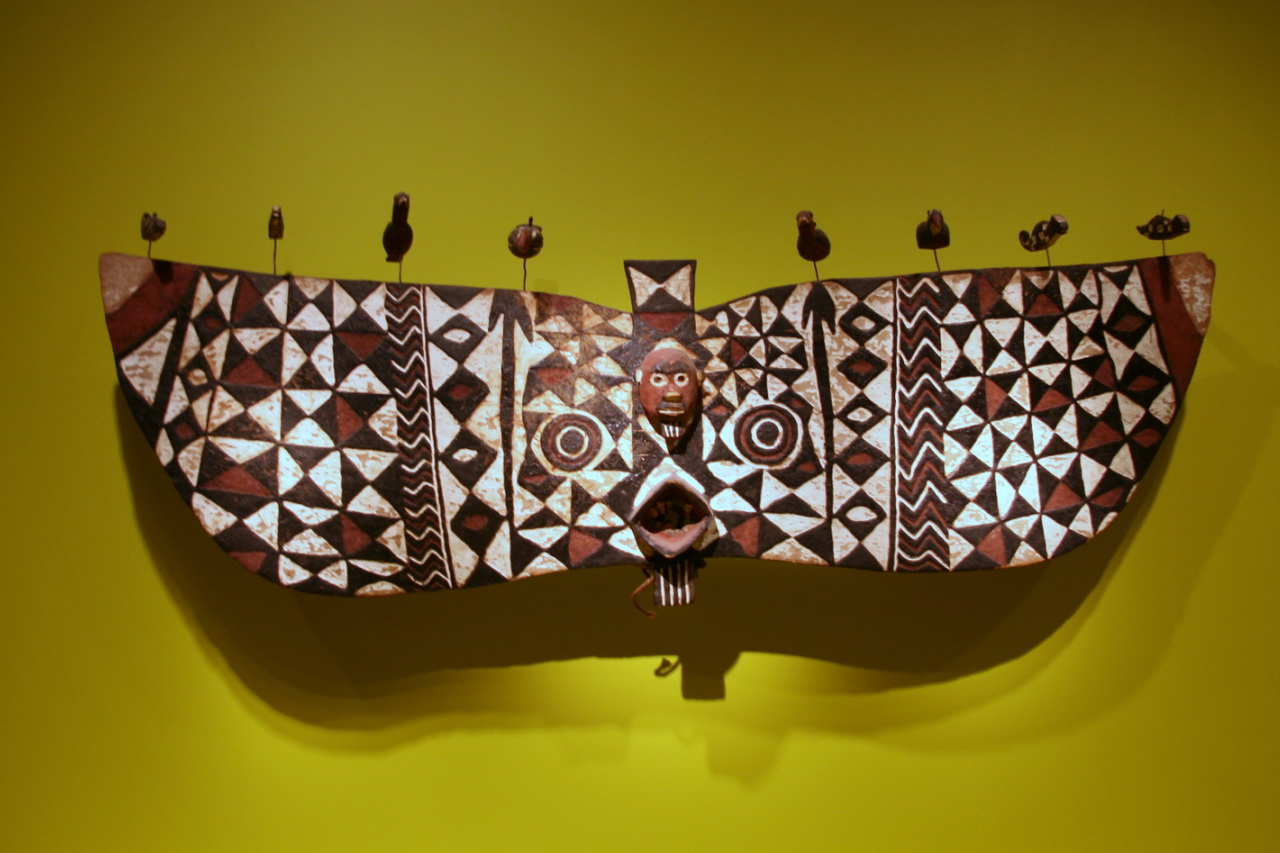
Butterfly mask

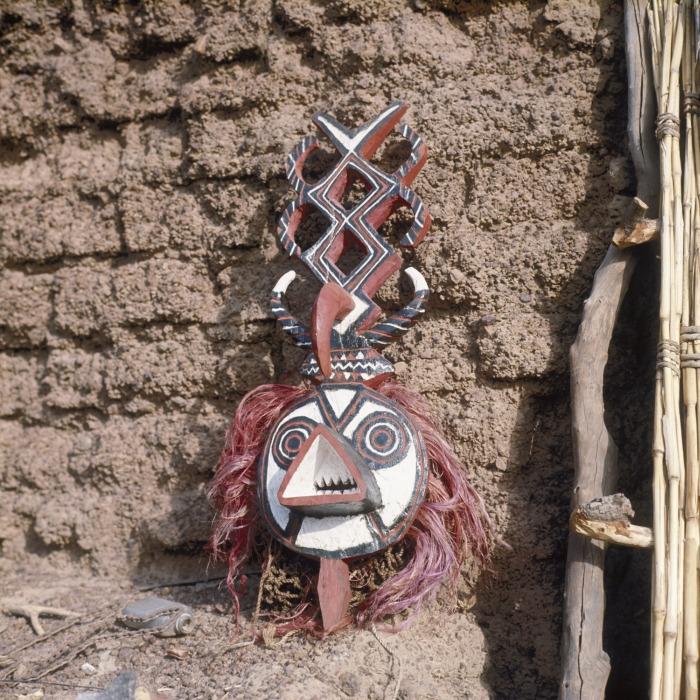
Face mask

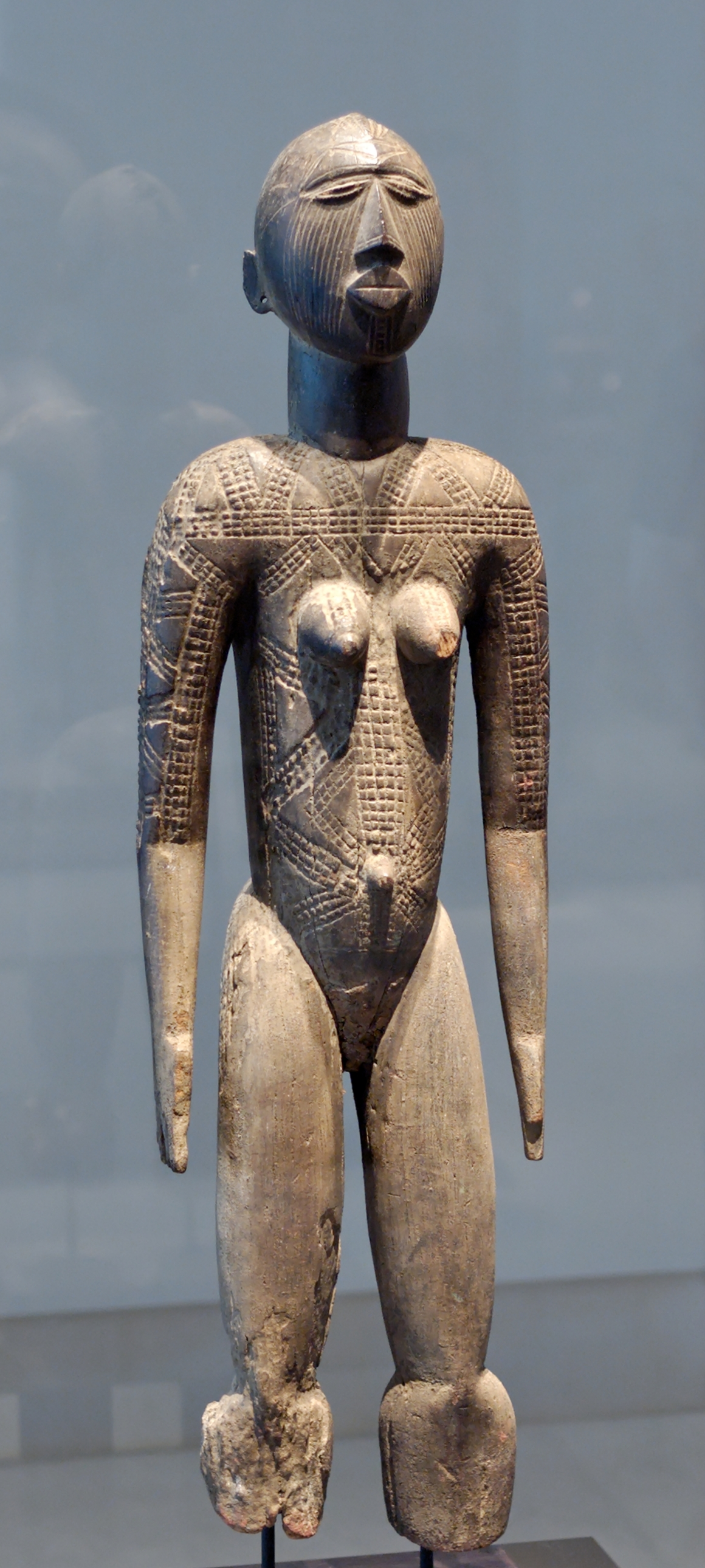
Sculpture from the Léo region
