= Chala language =

Gur language spoken in Ghana

Chala
- Region: Ghana
- Native speakers: 3,000 (2003)
- Language family: Niger–Congo?: Atlantic–Congo; Gur; Southern; Gurunsi; Eastern; Chala

Language codes
- ISO 639-3: cll
- Glottolog: chal1269
- ELP: Chala

Chala (Cala) is a Gur language of Ghana.
