= Lopou =

- Town and sub-prefecture
- Location in Ivory Coast
- Coordinates: 5°25′N 4°28′W
- Country: Ivory Coast
- District: Lagunes
- Region: Grands-Ponts
- Department: Dabou

Population (2014)
  - Total: 30,269
- Time zone: UTC+0 (GMT)

Lopou is a town in southern Ivory Coast. It is a sub-prefecture of the Dabou Department in the Grands-Ponts Region, Lagunes District.

Lopou was a commune until March 2012, when it became one of 1,126 communes nationwide that were abolished.

In 2014, the population of the sub-prefecture of Lopou was 30,269.

== Villages ==
The 14 villages of the sub-prefecture of Lopou and their population in 2014 are:

1. Adangba-Eby (707)
2. Agnimangbo (995)
3. Ahouya (1,142)
4. Akakro (1,342)
5. Kodogodji (610)
6. Kroufian (1,180)
7. Lopou (7,396)
8. N'doumikro (939)
9. Nouvel-Ousrou (5,375)
10. Vieil-Ousrou (725)
11. Yassap A (2,853)
12. Yassap B (1,866)
13. Yomidji (2,155)
14. Youhoulil (2,984)
