= Onitsha-Ado =

Village in South-Eastern Nigeria

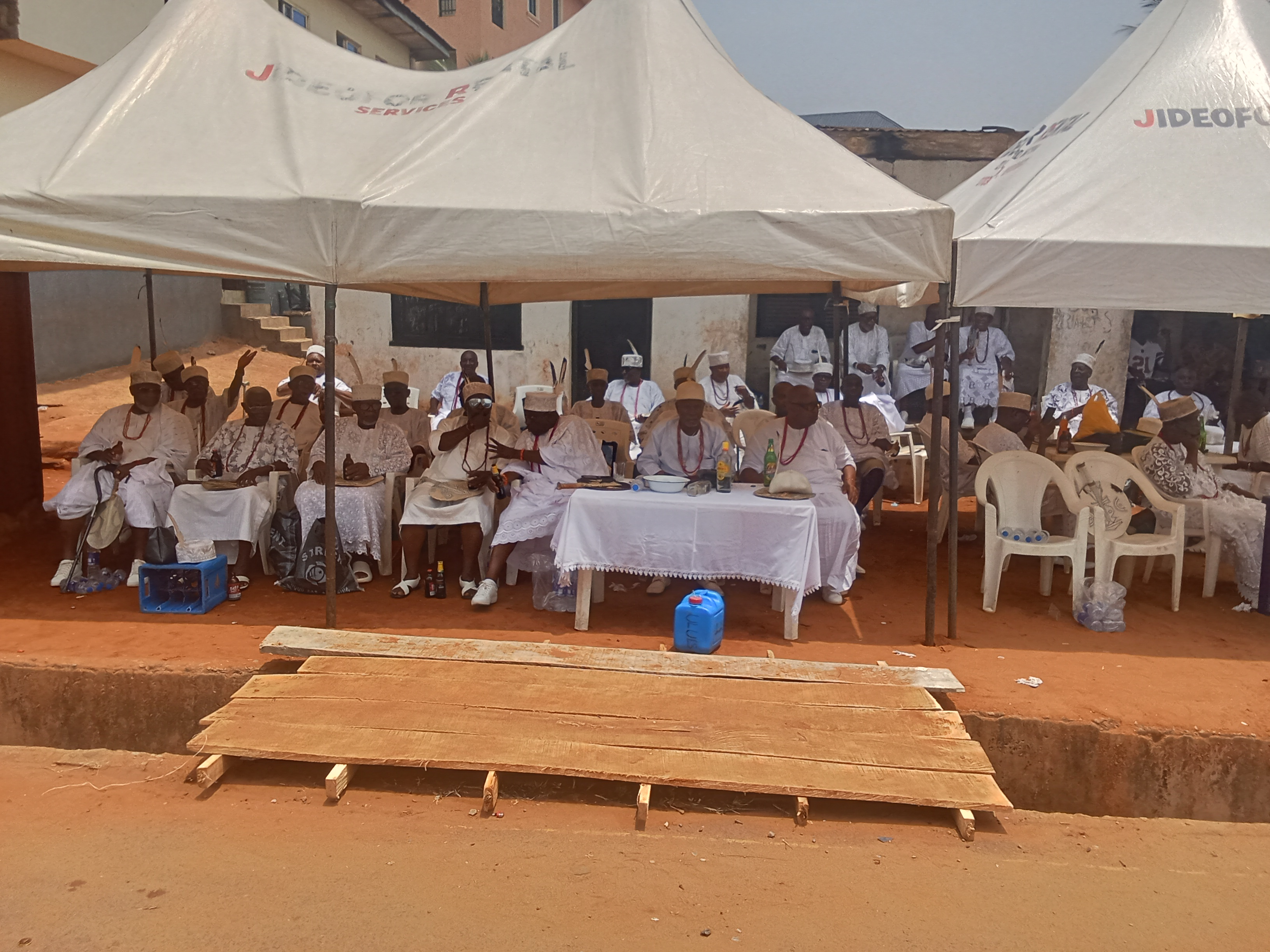
Titled men of Onitsha Ado n'Idu

Onicha-Ado alternatively Onicha-Ado n’Idu is an Igbo town found at the eastern shores of River Niger. The town is originally occupied by one Ezechime clans about 5000 years ago. The village that was later incorporated and formed the city of Onitsha, on the east bank of the river Niger in eastern Nigeria, in the area currently called the Anambra state of Nigeria.
