= Winye language =

Gur language of Burkina Faso

Winyé
- Kolsi
- Native to: Burkina Faso
- Native speakers: (20,000 cited 1999)
- Language family: Niger–Congo?: Atlantic–Congo; Gur; Southern; Gurunsi; Western; Winyé

Language codes
- ISO 639-3: kst
- Glottolog: winy1241

Winyé, or Kolsi, is a Gur language of Burkina Faso. Speakers are largely monolingual.
