= M'Bato =

Akan people in Ivory Coast

The M'Bato are an Akan people who live in the Ivory Coast.
