= Adjukru language =

Ivoirian language

Adjukru
- Adioukrou
- Mↄjukru
- Native to: Ivory Coast
- Native speakers: 160,000 (2021)
- Language family: Niger–Congo?: Atlantic–Congo; Kwa; Adjukru
- Writing system: Latin

Language codes
- ISO 639-3: adj
- Glottolog: adio1239

Adjukru (Adioukrou, Adyoukrou, Adyukru, Ajukru) is a language spoken in Ivory Coast by the Adjoukrou people. It has an uncertain classification within the Kwa branch of the Niger–Congo family.

== Phonology ==
=== Consonants ===
The consonant phonemes are located in the chart below.

		Bilabial		Labiodental	Alveolar		Post- alveolar		Palatal	Labial–velar		Velar		Glottal
Nasal			m			n			ɲ				ŋ	
Plosive		p	b		t	d				k͡p	ɡ͡b	k	g	
Affricate					d͡z		t̠ʃ	d̠ʒ						
Fricative				f	s									h
Trill						r								
Approximant	Median								j		w			
Approximant	Lateral					l								

=== Vowels ===
	Front	Back
Close	i	u
Close-mid	e	o
Open-mid	ɛ	ɔ
Open	a	

=== Tones ===
There are five tones in Adjukru. /˦/ is high tone, /˨/ is low tone,/˦˨/ is falling tone, /˧/ is middle tone, and /˨˦/ is rising tone.

== See also ==
- Adjoukrou people
