= Yoruba Americans =

Americans of Yoruba birth or descent

Total population
- 315,000 (estimate)

Regions with significant populations
- Boston, Atlanta, Chicago, Philadelphia, Houston and Washington, D.C. metropolitan area. New York, Maryland, New Jersey, Rhode Island, Florida, Louisiana, California and most Southern States.

Languages
- English (American English), Yoruba, Nigerian English), French, Spanish and Nigerian Pidgin.

Religion
- Christianity, Islam, and Yoruba religion

Related ethnic groups
- African Americans, Beninese Americans, Black Canadians, Nigerian Americans, Nigerian Canadians, Yoruba Canadians, Yoruba people

Yoruba Americans (Yoruba: Àwọn ọmọ Yorùbá Amẹrika) are Americans of Yoruba descent. The Yoruba people are a West African ethnic group that predominantly inhabits southwestern Nigeria, with smaller indigenous communities in Benin and Togo.

== History ==
The first Yoruba people who arrived to the United States were imported as slaves from Nigeria and Benin during the Atlantic slave trade. This ethnicity of the slaves was one of the main origins of present-day Nigerians who arrived to the United States, along with the Igbo. In addition, native slaves of current Benin hailed from peoples such as Nago, (Note: (Yoruba subgroup, although exported mainly by Spanish, when Louisiana was Spanish)) Ewe, Fon, and Gen. Many of the slaves imported to the modern United States from Benin were sold by the Kingdom of Dahomey, in Whydah. (Note: Indeed, Dahomey was one of the main proslavery Kingdoms of West Africa during the colonial period of the Americas and the nineteenth century, arriving to his maximum economic splendor to late of the eighteenth century thanks to its slave trade with the European traders of many areas of the Americas (from the U.S. to Brazil). The majority of his slaves were, from that time, to second half of the nineteenth century, of Yoruba origin.)

The slaves brought with them their cultural practices, languages, cuisine and religious beliefs rooted in spirit and ancestor worship. So, the manners of the Yoruba, Fon, Gen and Ewe of Benin were key elements of Louisiana Voodoo. Also Haitians, who migrated to Louisiana in the late nineteenth century and also contributed to Voodoo of this state, have the Yoruba, Fon, and Ewe among their main origins.

Cuban immigrants brought with them the Santería religion, a child of the Yoruba religion and Catholicism. In New York City Santería was founded by Oba Ifa Morote. Born in 1903 in Cuba, he immigrated to NYC in 1946, took the name Padrino, and began practicing as a babalawo.

On May 23, 1980, the city's animal health authorities raided the apartment of one of Padrino's followers on East 146th Street in the Bronx. The American Society for the Prevention of Cruelty to Animals (ASPCA) had complained about Santería's practices of animal sacrifice. Three goats and eighteen chickens were removed from the dwelling.

In the colonies, masters tried to dissuade the practice of tribal customs. They also sometimes mixed people of different ethnic groups to make it more difficult for them to communicate and bond together in rebellion. Today, many African Americans possess ancestry going back to the Yoruba people.

After the slavery abolition in 1865, many modern Nigerian immigrants of Yoruba ancestry have come to the United States starting in the mid-twentieth century to pursue educational opportunities in undergraduate and post-graduate institutions. President Lyndon B. Johnson signed the Immigration and Nationality Act of 1965, which allowed for a significant number of Nigerians of Yoruba ancestry to immigrate to the United States. During the 1960s and 1970s, after the Nigerian-Biafran War, Nigeria's government funded scholarships for Nigerian students, and many of them were admitted to American universities. While this was happening, there were several military coups and brief periods of civilian rule. All this caused many Nigerians to emigrate. Most of these Nigerian immigrants are of Yoruba, Igbo and Ibibio origins.

Yoruba have often found American habits of pet keeping very strange, culturally unfamiliar.

== List of Yoruba Americans ==
- Cudjoe Lewis, one of the last known survivors of the Atlantic slave trade
- Matilda McCrear, one of the last known survivors of the Atlantic slave trade
- Scipio Vaughan, slave
- Folarin Balogun, soccer player.
- Brendon Ayanbadejo, football player
- Femi Emiola, actress
- Lola Ogunnaike, entertainment journalist
- Adewale Ogunleye, football player
- Toyin Falola, historian
- Oluwatoyin Asojo, biochemist
- Hakeem Olajuwon, basketball player
- Oye Owolewa, politician
- Wale, rapper
- Kehinde Wiley, artist
- Harold Demuren, aeronautical engineer
- Oshoke Abalu, architect and futurist
- Toluse Olorunnipa, political commentator
- Abiola Irele, literary scholar
- Babatunde Ogunnaike, chemical engineer
- Ilesanmi Adesida, physicist
- Akintunde Akinwande, electrical engineer
- Kamaru Usman, mixed martial arts fighter
- Chamillionaire, rapper
- Tomi Adeyemi, novelist
- Wally Adeyemo, United States Deputy Secretary of the Treasury
- Luvvie Ajayi, blogger
- David Oyelowo, actor
- Dot da Genius, music producer
- Tanitoluwa Adewumi, chess player
- Deji Akinwande, electrical and computer engineering professor
- Akinwumi Ogundiran, archaeologist
- Bamidele A. Ojo, political scientist
- Kunle Olukotun, computer scientist
- Mojisola Adeyeye pharmacist and professor
- Fela Sowande, musician and composer
- Nelson M. Oyesiku, neurosurgeon
- Olufunmilayo Olopade, hematologist
- Yewande Olubummo, mathematician
- Kate Okikiolu, mathematician
- Rick Famuyiwa, film director
- Temie Giwa-Tubosun, entrepreneur
- Folakemi T. Odedina, pharmacy professor
- Bo Oshoniyi, soccer player
- Sope Aluko, actress
- Sade Baderinwa, news anchor
- Folake Olowofoyeku, actress
- Tunde Adebimpe, lead singer of TV on the Radio
- Adebayo Ogunlesi, lawyer and investment banker
- Jimmy Adegoke, climatologist
- Dayo Okeniyi, actor
- Arike Ogunbowale, basketball player
- Benson Mayowa, football player
- Bayo Ojikutu, creative writer
- Adebayo Alonge, entrepreneur
- Tosin Abasi, founder and lead guitarist of Animals as Leaders
- Nelson M. Oyesiku, neurosurgeon
- Lola Eniola-Adefeso, chemical engineer
- Deborah Ayorinde, actress
- Jacob K. Olupona, scholar of indigenous African religions
- Mobolaji Dawodu, fashion designer
- Stephen Adebanji Akintoye, historian
- Ade A. Olufeko, artist and technologist
- Toyin Ojih Odutola, graphic artist
- Esther Agbaje, attorney and politician
- Abiodun Koya, classical opera singer
- Ibiyinka Alao, architect
- John Dabiri, aerospace engineer
- Adewale Ogunleye, football player
- Tobi Jnohope, footballer
- Ayo Dosunmu, basketball player
- Oluwatoyin Salau, murder victim
- Rockmond Dunbar, actor

== See also ==
- African diaspora
- Odunde Festival
- African Americans
- Nigerian Americans
- African Americans in Louisiana
- Lucumi people
- Yoruba Canadians
- Afro-Jamaicans
- Afro-Puerto Rican
- Afro-Cubans
- Afro-Brazilians
- Saros
- Yoruba people
- Yoruba language
- Igbo Americans
