= Chakali language =

Gur language of Ghana

Chakali
- Native to: Ghana
- Region: Northern Region
- Native speakers: 6,000 (2003)
- Language family: Niger–Congo?: Atlantic–Congo; Gur; Southern; Gurunsi; Western; Chakali

Language codes
- ISO 639-3: cli
- Glottolog: chak1271
- ELP: Chakali

Chakali (tʃàkálɪ́ɪ́) is a Gur language of Ghana, spoken by almost 3,500 individuals in several villages in the Wa East District of the Upper West Region. More specifically, Chakali is spoken by inhabitants of the Tiisa, Sogla, Tousa, Motigu, Ducie, Katua and Gurumbele villages. The majority of Chakali speakers also speak Wali or Bulengi. Some believe that the language of Chakali is soon to be extinct, with Wali and Bulengi becoming the only languages that will be spoken in those villages.

== Phonology ==
Chakali phonology is typical of Gur languages, with tone, vowel harmony, and labial–velar consonant. The majority of Chakali's syllables fall into one of three categories C(consonant)V(vowel), CVC and CVV. All the other syllable combinations found in Chakali are extremely rare and are not found in the middle syllable of a word.

=== Vowels ===
Chakali contrasts long and short vowels, as well as advanced and retracted tongue root vowels, which play a role in vowel harmony. While typically treated as a "neutral" vowel for tongue root harmony, /a/ might surface as [ɑ] following -ATR vowels, but this is not phonemic. Additionally, [ə] arises during epenthesis or vowel reduction.

	Front		Back	
	Unrounded		Rounded	
	−ATR	+ATR	−ATR	+ATR
Close	ɪ	i	ʊ	u
Mid	ɛ	e	ɔ	o
Open	a			

All phonemic vowels can also appear nasalized, which is often due to the influence of a neighboring nasal consonant or glottal fricative. Nasal vowels do occur phonemically in certain words, as demonstrated by near-minimal or minimal pairs:

- /zʊ̀ʊ̀/ 'enter', /zʊ̃̀ʊ̃̀/ 'laziness'
- /fáà/ 'ancient', /fã̀ã̀/ 'do by force'
- /tùù/ 'go down', /tṹṹ/ 'honey'

=== Consonants ===
	Labial	Alveolar	Postalveolar/ Palatal	Velar		Glottal
	Labial	Alveolar	Postalveolar/ Palatal	plain	labial	Glottal
Nasal	m	n	ɲ	ŋ	ŋ͡m	
Stop	p b	t d	t͡ʃ d͡ʒ	k ɡ	k͡p ɡ͡b	ʔ
Fricative	f v	s z				h
Approximant		l	j		w	
Rhotic		r~ɾ				

- /t/ surfaces as [r] in word-final or word-medial onset position.
- /k/ and /g/ usually surface as [ɣ] between vowels.
- All nasals are realized as [ŋ] in word-final position.

=== Tone and Intonation ===
Chakali is considered a tone language; variations in pitch are used to change the lexical and grammatical meaning of words and phrases. Chakali has two major categories of tone: high and low; mid tones cause no lexical change and are considered to be derived from either high or low tones (such that a mid tone is considered to be either a lowered high tone or a raised low tone). Tones may also be considered as contour tones: either as falling or rising.

== Grammar ==
Chakali is a subject–verb–object language.

=== Verbs ===
The most common amount of syllables found in Chakali verbs contain either one, two, or three syllables, and of those three syllable amounts having only two syllables in the verb is the most common in Chakali.

=== Numerals ===
Chakali’s number system can be separated into atomic numbers and complex. Atomic numbers include 1-8, 10, 20, 100, and 1000. Complex numbers can be obtained through the subtraction, addition and/or multiplication of its units. For example. fɪ́dɪ̀dɪ́gɪ́túò (nineteen) is the addition of fɪ́ (10), dɪ (and), and dɪ́gɪ́tūō (9). Note: In numbers 11-19 /dɪ/ can change to /d/ if the following unit begins with a vowel like in fɪ́dàŋɔ̃ (15).

Numbers 21-99 are formed by multiples of 20; like in the French number system, where 80 is formed by multiplying 4 times 20, quatre-vingt. For example: màtféó álɪ́é ànɪ́ fɪ́dālʊ̄pɛ̀ (57) which translates directly to twenty, two and seventeen.

Numbers 101-999 and 1001+ are formed likewise, but in multiples of 100's and 1000's. For example: 1999 is tʊ́sʊ̀ ànɪ́ kɔ̀sá dɪ́gɪ́tūō ànɪ́ màftéó ànáásɛ̀ àní fɪ́dɪ̀dɪ́gɪ́túò, which translates directly to 1000 and 100's, 9 and 20, 4 and 19. Note: hundred and thousand have plural forms.
