= Bago-Kusuntu language =

Gur language of Togo

Bago-Kusuntu
- Region: Togo
- Native speakers: 9,900 (2012)
- Language family: Niger–Congo?: Atlantic–Congo; Gur; Southern; Gurunsi; Eastern; Bago-Kusuntu
- Dialects: Bago; Kusuntu

Language codes
- ISO 639-3: bqg
- Glottolog: bago1245
- ELP: Bago-Kusuntu

Bago-Kusuntu (dialects Bago, Kusuntu) is a Gur language of Togo.
