= Avikam people =

Akan people in Ivory Coast

Avikam
- Traditional Avikam outfit

Regions with significant populations
- Ivory Coast

Related ethnic groups
- Other Akan subgroups

The Avikam are an Akan people who live predominantly in Ivory Coast.

== History ==
The Avikam people of southern Cote d 'Ivoire live in a tropical rainforest fringed by a coastal lagoon. The nearby city of Abidjan, the country's economic capital, is also home to many of them.

== Major Occupation ==
Most of Avikam people earn a living from agriculture. Some are subsistence farmers, living off what they raise in their own fields. Others work in agricultural cooperatives that grow palm oil, coconut, cassava or bananas. Still others work for large producers of rubber and palm oil.

== Religion ==
About a century ago, missionaries from Africa and Europe delivered the Gospel to the Avikam people. Today, a sizable portion claim to be Christians while yet adhering to strongly established animistic customs. Strong believers frequently experience daily pressure from individuals who insist on employing fetishes, or things produced by humans that are thought to have supernatural powers, to fend off evil spirits.
