= Pana language (Gur) =

Gur language of Burkina Faso and Mali

Pana
- Sama
- Region: Burkina Faso, Mali
- Native speakers: (8,000 cited 1982–1998)
- Language family: Niger–Congo?: Atlantic–Congo; Gur; Southern; Gurunsi; Northern; Pana

Language codes
- ISO 639-3: pnq
- Glottolog: pana1295
- ELP: Pana (Burkina Faso)

Pana is a Gur language of Burkina Faso and Mali.
