= Toupah =

- Town and sub-prefecture
- Location in Ivory Coast
- Coordinates: 5°19′N 4°34′W
- Country: Ivory Coast
- District: Lagunes
- Region: Grands-Ponts
- Department: Dabou

Population (2014)
  - Total: 30,175
- Time zone: UTC+0 (GMT)

Toupah is a town in southern Ivory Coast. It is a sub-prefecture of Dabou Department in Grands-Ponts Region, Lagunes District.

Toupah was a commune until March 2012, when it became one of 1,126 communes nationwide that were abolished.

In 2014, the population of the sub-prefecture of Toupah was 30,175.

== Villages ==
The eleven villages of the sub-prefecture of Toupah and their population in 2014 are:

1. Agbaille (2,195)
2. Cosrou (4,712)
3. Ira (4,288)
4. Kaka (1,230)
5. Kpandah (1,266)
6. Niamiambo (1,060)
7. Niguinanou (1,640)
8. Okpoyou (1,485)
9. Petit-Badien (6,933)
10. Toupah (4,112)
11. Vieux-Badien (1,254)
