= Gurunsi languages =

Gur language group of West Africa

Grũsi
- Gurunsi; East Mabia
- Geographic distribution: Burkina Faso, northern Ghana and Togo
- Ethnicity: Gurunsi peoples
- Linguistic classification: Niger–Congo?: Atlantic–Congo; Savannas; Gur; Southern Gur; Grũsi

Language codes
- ISO 639-3: –
- Glottolog: grus1239

The Grũsi or Gurunsi languages, also known as the East Mabia languages, are a group of Gur languages, comprising about 20 languages spoken by the Gurunsi peoples. The Grũsi languages are spoken in northern Ghana, adjacent areas of Burkina Faso and Togo. The largest language in the Grusi group is Kabiye, a language spoken by approximately 1.2 million people (of which 550,000 are native speakers) throughout central Togo.

== Languages ==
- Eastern: Lukpa, Kabiyé, Tem, Lama, Delo, Bago-Kusuntu, Chala
- Northern: Lyélé, Nuni, Kalamsé, Pana, Kasem
- Western: Winyé, Deg, Phuie, Paasaal–Sisaala, Chakali, Siti, Tampulma, Vagla

According to Kleinewillinghöfer (2002), the western Southeastern Gurunsi languages Cala and Dulo are influenced by Kwa languages. The eastern Southeastern Gurunsi languages Bago and Kusuntu display less external influences, but have some influence from Yoruboid languages.

== See also ==
- List of Proto-Gurunsi reconstructions (Wiktionary)
