= Puguli language =

Language spoken in Burkina Faso

Puguli
- Phuie
- Native to: Burkina Faso
- Region: West Africa
- Native speakers: (14,000 cited 2000)
- Language family: Niger–Congo?: Atlantic–Congo; Gur; Southern; Gurunsi; Western; Puguli
- Writing system: African reference alphabet (Latin)

Language codes
- ISO 639-3: pug
- Glottolog: phui1238

Puguli or Phuie (Pwĩẽ) is the language of the Phuo people. It is spoken in Burkina Faso.

== Phonology ==
=== Consonants ===
Consonants
		Labial	Alveolar	Palatal	Velar	Labial–velar	Glottal
Nasal		m	n	ɲ	ŋ	ŋm	
Plosive	voiceless	p	t	c	k	kp	(ʔ)
Plosive	voiced	b	d	ɟ ⟨j⟩	ɡ	ɡb	
Plosive	aspirated	pʰ	tʰ	cʰ	kʰ		
Implosive		ɓ	ɗ				
Fricative	voiceless	f	s				h
Fricative	voiced	v	z				
Approximant	plain		l	j ⟨y⟩		w	
Approximant	glottalized			ˀj ⟨ƴ⟩		ˀw ⟨ⱳ⟩	
Tap			ɾ ⟨r⟩				

Aspirated consonants are written with a succeeding ⟨h⟩: ⟨ph, th, ch, kh⟩.

The glottal stop [ʔ] is not part of the orthography but appears frequently in Berthelette (2001)'s survey data, typically word-initially and word-finally.

Malo (2014)'s orthography guide describes ⟨c j⟩ as 'alveo-palatal occlusives', using the phonetic transcriptions [c ɟ], but states [c] as sounding like ⟨tch⟩ to French speakers. It is therefore unclear if the transcriptions are truly phonetic or if they are being used more loosely and are actually referring to the postalveolar affricates [tʃ dʒ], which have sometimes been transcribed with /c ɟ/ in IPA illustrations and may also be described as 'alveo-palatal occlusives', though ambiguous. The author's original transcriptions are used in the chart above. Similarly, Malo explicitly states ⟨ch⟩ is not a fricative [ʃ] as it is in French, but it is unclear if it refers to [cʰ] or [tʃʰ]. Berthelette (2001)'s survey data includes multiple examples of [c] with occasional realization as [kʲ] (depending on the dialect) as well as examples of [tʲ dʲ] (which are acoustically similar to [tʃ dʒ]), and no examples of affricates, suggesting that they may truly be (alveo-)palatal plosives.

=== Vowels ===
Vowels
	Front		Back	
	tense	lax	tense	lax
Close	i	ɪ ⟨ɩ⟩	u	ʊ ⟨ʋ⟩
Mid	e	ɛ	o	ɔ
Open	ɑ ⟨a⟩			

All vowels have nasalized forms and are written with the typical tilde above. In some dialects, the nasal vowels /ẽ ɛ̃ ɑ̃/ may be realized as [æ̃] or [æn]. The mid central vowel [ə] appears in a small subset of Berthelette (2001)'s survey data as a realization of /o/.

Labialization of consonants is written with the close back rounded vowels ⟨u ʋ⟩, rather than typical ⟨w⟩. The close front unrounded vowel ⟨i⟩ may be realized as palatalization on the preceding consonants.

=== Tones ===
There are two phonemic tones, high ⟨◌́⟩ and low ⟨◌̀⟩, as well as a lexically contrastive but non-phonemic downstepped high tone ⟨◌́ꜝ⟩. The low tone is written with the grave accent ⟨◌̀⟩ (as in IPA), the downstepped high tone is written with the acute accent ⟨◌́⟩, and the plain high tone is unmarked. Berthelette (2001)'s survey data also shows phonetic possibility of mid ⟨◌̄⟩ and falling ⟨◌̂⟩ tones.

== Orthography ==
Puguli/Phuie alphabet
Uppercase	A	B	Ɓ	C	Ch	D	Ɗ	E	Ɛ	F	G	Gb	H	I	Ɩ	J	K	Kh	Kp	L	
Lowercase	a	b	ɓ	c	ch	d	ɗ	e	ɛ	f	g	gb	h	i	ɩ	j	k	kh	kp	l	
Uppercase	M	N	Ɲ	Ŋ	Ŋm	O	Ɔ	P	Ph	R	S	T	Th	U	Ʋ	V	W	Ⱳ	Y	Ƴ	Z
Lowercase	m	n	ɲ	ŋ	ŋm	o	ɔ	p	ph	r	s	t	th	u	ʋ	v	w	ⱳ	y	ƴ	z

Nasalization is indicated with a tilde: ã ẽ ɛ̃ ĩ ɩ̃ õ ɔ̃ ũ ʋ̃. The tilde is not indicated in the presence of a nasal consonant or when the first nasalized vowel is indicated.

The high tone, the most frequent, is not indicated. The low tone is indicated with the grave accent: à è ɛ̀ ì ɩ̀ ò ɔ̀ ù ʋ̀ ã̀ ẽ̀ ɛ̃̀ ĩ̀ ɩ̃̀ ɔ̃̀ õ̀ ɔ̃̀ ũ̀ ʋ̃̀ and the low high tone is indicated with an acute accent: á é ɛ́ í ɩ́ ó ɔ́ ú ʋ́ ã́ ẽ́ ɛ̃́ ĩ́ ɩ̃́ ṍ ɔ̃́ ṹ ʋ̃́.
