= Gule tribe =

Gule is a tribe of the Shilluk people in Sudan in between the Blue and White Nile. The primary language is Sudanese Arabic after their native language, Gule, went extinct.

They claim direct relation to the Funj Sultanate.
