= Grand-Lahou Department =

Coordinates: 5°8′N 5°1′W

Grand-Lahou Department Département de Grand-Lahou
- Department
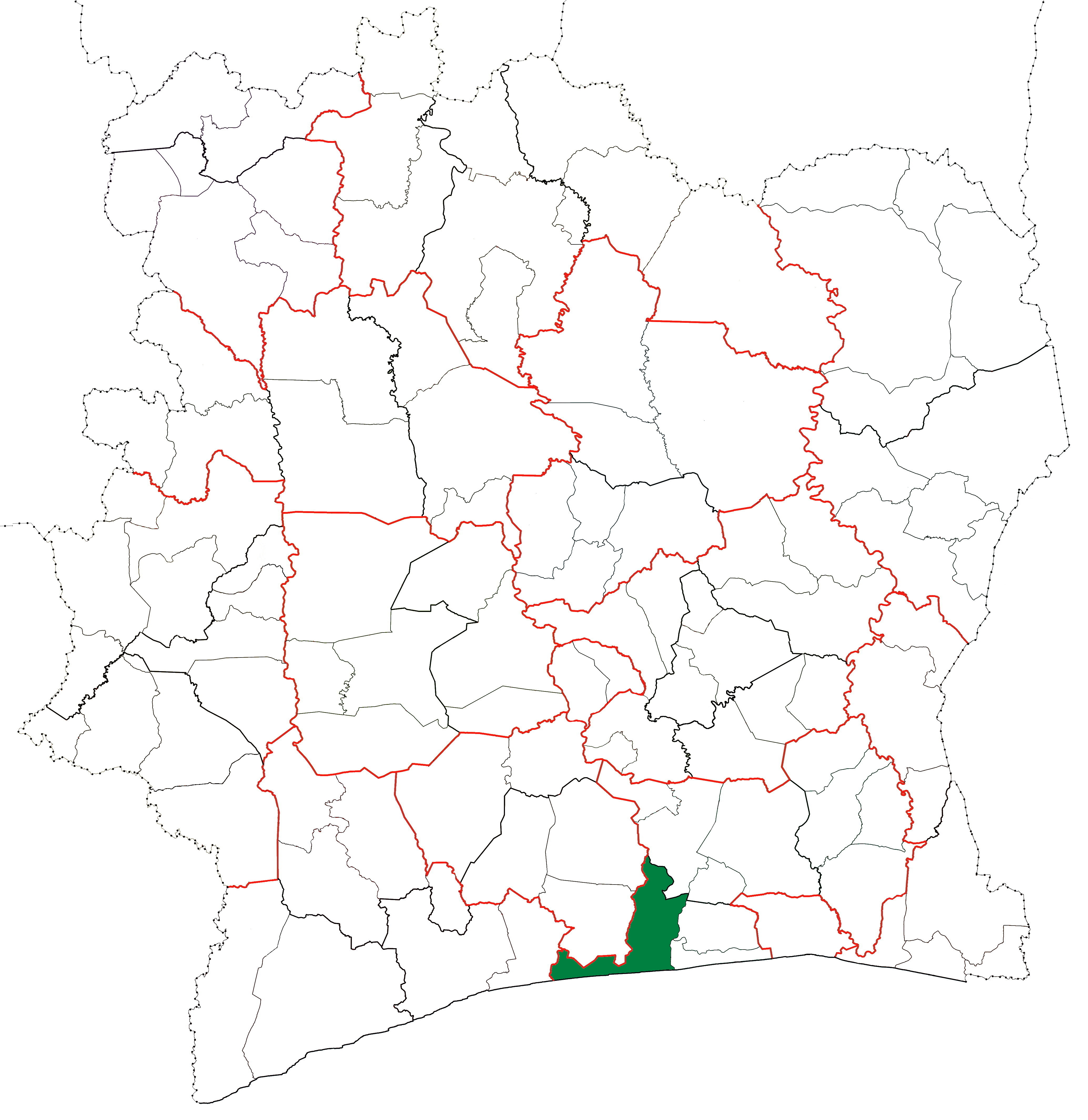
- Location in Ivory Coast. Grand-Lahou Department has retained the same boundaries since its creation in 1988.
- Country: Ivory Coast
- District: Lagunes
- Region: Grands-Ponts
- 1988: Established as a first-level subdivision via a division of Abidjan Dept
- 1997: Converted to a second-level subdivision
- 2011: Converted to a third-level subdivision
- Departmental seat: Grand-Lahou

Government
  - Prefect: Kouamé Jean-Baptiste Zamélé

Area
  - Total: 2,320 km^{2} (900 sq mi)

Population (2021 census)
  - Total: 155,832
  - Density: 67.2/km^{2} (174/sq mi)
- Time zone: UTC+0 (GMT)

Grand-Lahou Department is a department of Grands-Ponts Region in Lagunes District, Ivory Coast. In 2021, its population was 155,832 and its seat is the settlement of Grand-Lahou. The sub-prefectures of the department are Ahouanou, Bacanda, Ebonou, Grand-Lahou, and Toukouzou.

== History ==
Grand-Lahou Department was created in 1988 as a first-level subdivision via a split-off from Abidjan Department.

In 1997, regions were introduced as new first-level subdivisions of Ivory Coast; as a result, all departments were converted into second-level subdivisions. Grand-Lahou Department was included in Lagunes Region.

In 2011, districts were introduced as new first-level subdivisions of Ivory Coast. At the same time, regions were reorganised and became second-level subdivisions and all departments were converted into third-level subdivisions. At this time, Grand-Lahou Department became part of Grands-Ponts Region in Lagunes District.
