= Dabou =

- Town, sub-prefecture, and commune
- Location in Ivory Coast
- Coordinates: 5°19′N 4°23′W
- Country: Ivory Coast
- District: Lagunes
- Region: Grands-Ponts
- Department: Dabou

Area
  - Total: 190 sq mi (480 km^{2})

Population (2021 census)
  - Total: 138,083
  - Density: 750/sq mi (290/km^{2})
  - Town: 61,942
- (2014 census)
- Time zone: UTC+0 (GMT)

Dabou is a port town in southern Ivory Coast. It is the seat of both the Lagunes District and the Grands-Ponts Region. It is also the seat of and a sub-prefecture of the Dabou Department. Dabou is also a commune.

The town is served by Dabou Airport. Writer Regina Yaou was born in the town.

In 2021, the population of the sub-prefecture of Dabou was 138,083.

== Villages ==
The sixteen villages of the sub-prefecture of Dabou and their populations in 2014 are:

1. Agneby (820)
2. Armebe (1,293)
3. Dabou (61,942)
4. Debrimou (2,338)
5. Gbougbo (2,132)
6. Kpass (1,222)
7. N'gatty (1,026)
8. Akradio (5,553)
9. Bodou (344)
10. Bohn (820)
11. Bouboury (3,254)
12. Layo (820)
13. Mopoyem (1,162)
14. Orbaff (3,182)
15. Tiaha (985)
16. Vieil-Aklodj (1,537)

== Notable people ==
- Aristide Bahin (born 1987), footballer
- Christian Koffi (born 1990), footballer
- Regina Yaou (1955–2017), writer
