= Dabou Department =

Coordinates: 5°19′N 4°23′W

Dabou Department Département de Dabou
- Department
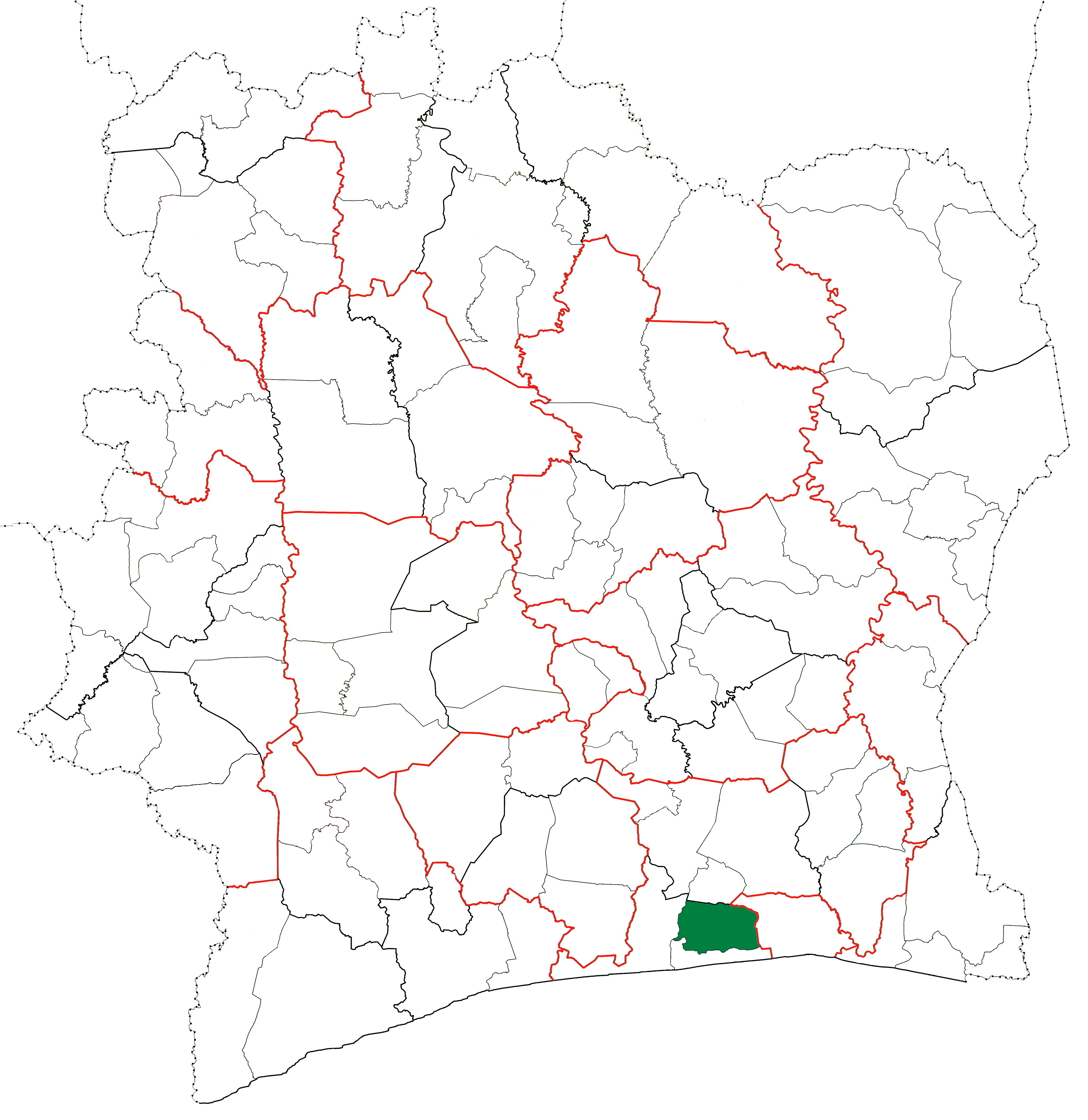
- Location in Ivory Coast. Dabou Department has had these boundaries since 2005.
- Country: Ivory Coast
- District: Lagunes
- Region: Grands-Ponts
- 1998: Established as a second-level subdivision via a division of Abidjan Dept
- 2005: Divided to create Sikensi Dept
- 2011: Converted to a third-level subdivision
- Departmental seat: Dabou

Government
  - Prefect: Kouakou Assoman

Area
  - Total: 1,460 km^{2} (560 sq mi)

Population (2021 census)
  - Total: 213,582
  - Density: 146/km^{2} (379/sq mi)
- Time zone: UTC+0 (GMT)

Dabou Department is a department of Grands-Ponts Region in Lagunes District, Ivory Coast. In 2021, its population was 213,582 and its seat is the settlement of Dabou. The sub-prefectures of the department are Dabou, Lopou, and Toupah.

== History ==
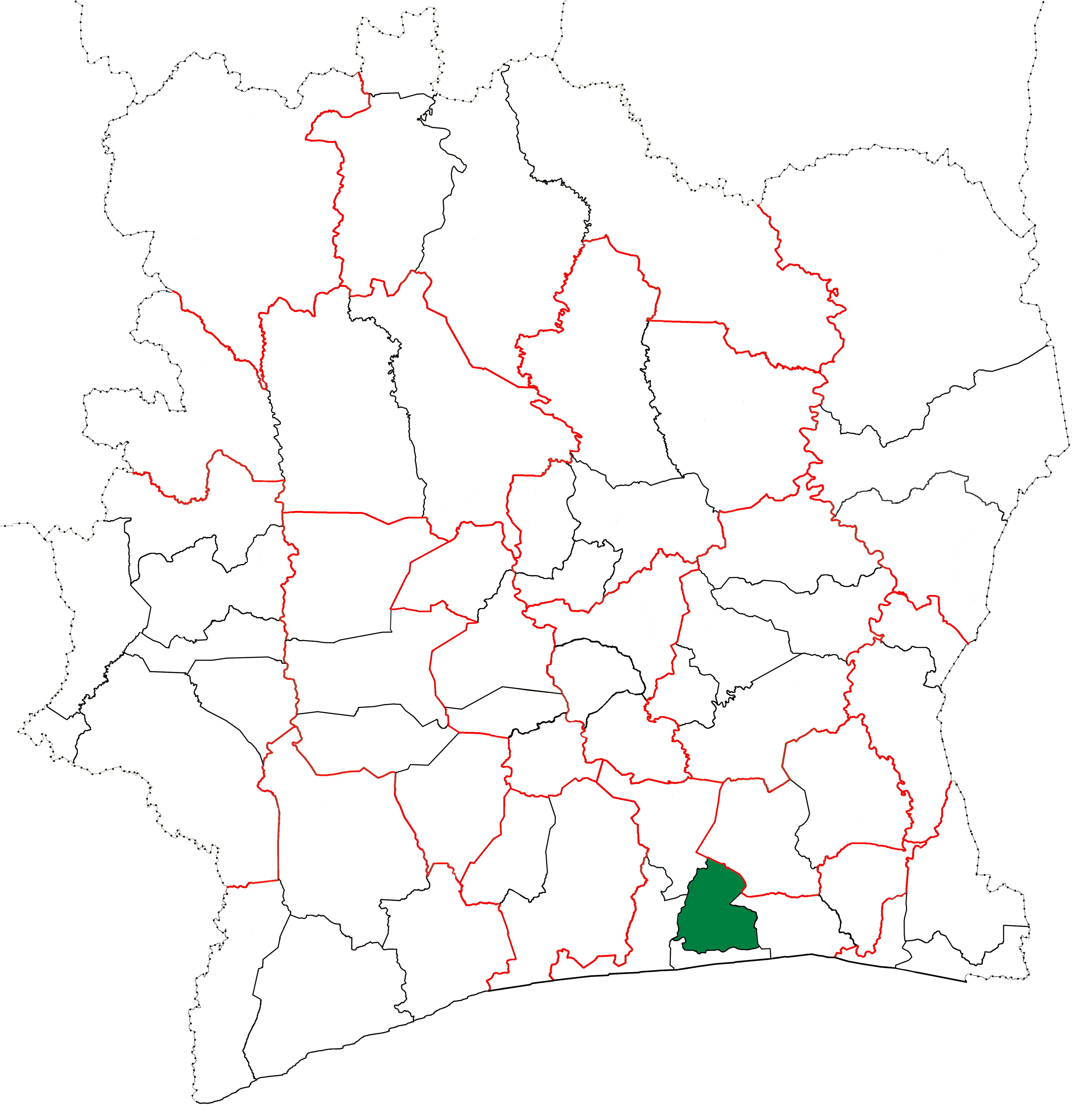
Dabou Department upon its creation in 1998. It kept these boundaries until 2005, but other subdivision boundary changes began to be made in 2000.

Dabou Department was created in 1998 as a second-level subdivision via a split-off from Abidjan Department. At its creation, it was part of Lagunes Region.

In 2005, Dabou Department was divided to create Sikensi Department.

In 2011, districts were introduced as new first-level subdivisions of Ivory Coast. At the same time, regions were reorganised and became second-level subdivisions and all departments were converted into third-level subdivisions. At this time, Dabou Department became part of Grands-Ponts Region in Lagunes District.
