= Grands-Ponts =

Coordinates: 5°19′N 4°23′W

Grands-Ponts Region Région des Grands-Ponts Leboutou Region Région du Leboutou
- Region
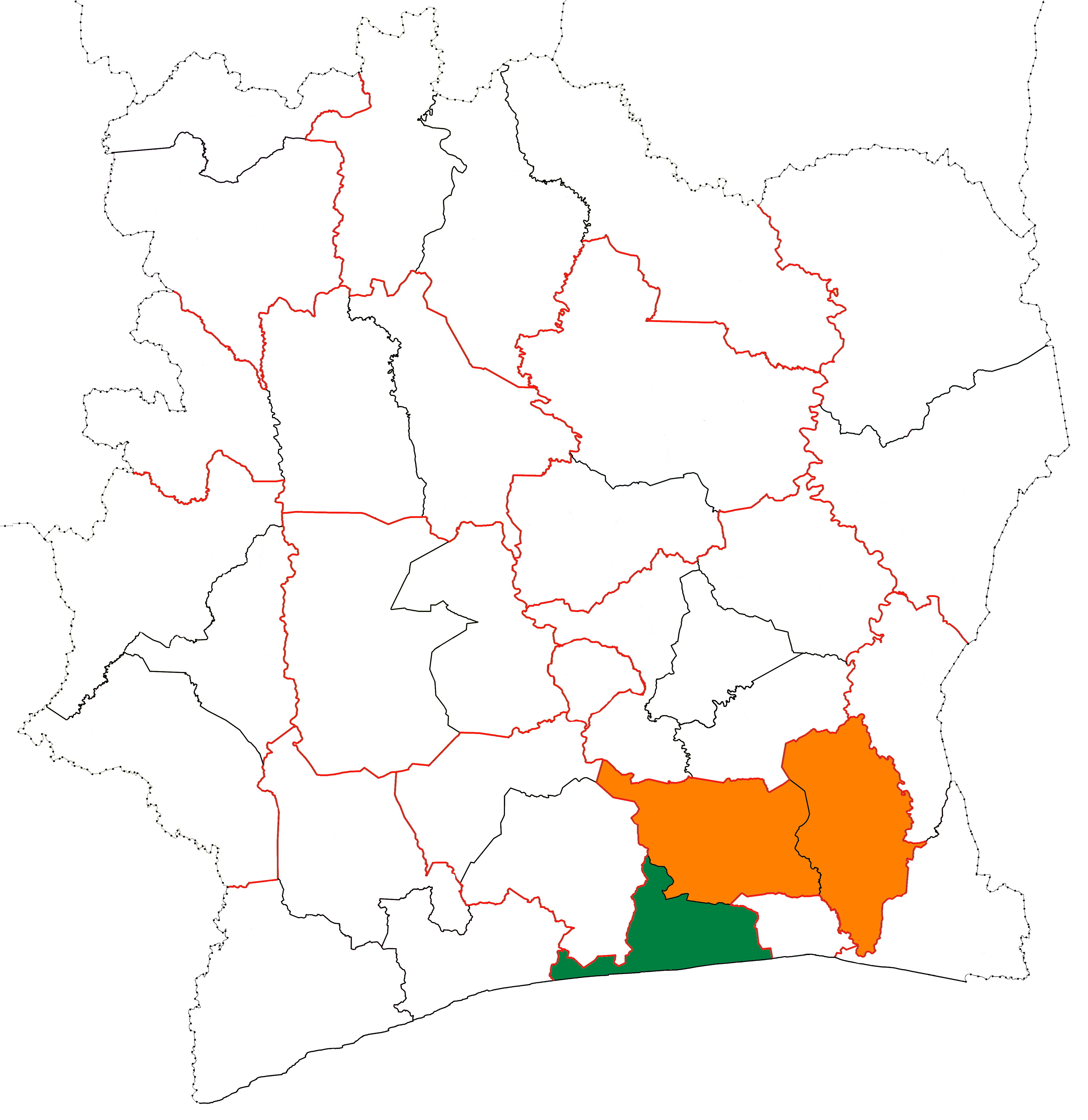
- Location of Grands-Ponts Region (green) in Ivory Coast and in Lagunes District
- Country: Ivory Coast
- District: Lagunes
- Established: 2011
- Regional seat: Dabou

Government
  - Prefect: Kouakou Assoman
  - Council President: Joseph Gabriel Yace

Area
  - Total: 4,430 km^{2} (1,710 sq mi)

Population (2021 census)
  - Total: 450,007
  - Density: 102/km^{2} (263/sq mi)
- Time zone: UTC+0 (GMT)

Grands-Ponts Region (also originally known as Leboutou Region) is one of the 31 regions of Ivory Coast. Since its establishment in 2011, it has been one of three regions in Lagunes District. The seat of the region is Dabou and the region's population in the 2021 census was 450,007.

Grands-Ponts is currently divided into three departments: Dabou, Grand-Lahou, and Jacqueville.

== Name ==
In the 2011 decree that created the region, Grands-Ponts included Abidjan Department and was referred to alternatively as the region of "Grands-Ponts" and "Leboutou". Shortly thereafter, it was determined that Abidjan Autonomous District and Abidjan Department would be co-extensive in territory; since that time, the name "Grands-Ponts" has been used exclusively.
