= Area 10, Lilongwe =

Town in Lilongwe District, Malawi

- Location within Malawi
- Coordinates: 13°59′S 33°48′E
- Country: Malawi
- Region: Central Region, Malawi
- Municipality: Lilongwe District
- Established: 1975

Area
  - Total: 20 km^{2} (7.7 sq mi)

Population (2018)
  - Total: 13,600
  - Density: 680/km^{2} (1,800/sq mi)

Racial makeup (2018)
  - Black African: 92.3%
  - Asian: 1.1%
  - White: 1.2%
  - Mixed: 3.1%
  - Other: 2.3%

First languages (2018)
  - Chewa: 47.4%
  - Tumbuka: 16.7%
  - Yao: 12.1%
  - Lomwe: 7.3%
  - Sena: 7.0%
  - Tonga: 2.1%
  - Mang'anja: 2.0%
  - Ngonde: 0.1%
  - Other: 4.3%
- Time zone: UTC+2
- Postal code: 4000
- Post-office box: 4440

Area 10 is a residential and commercial area located in the Lilongwe District of the Central Region in Malawi. It is situated in the capital city of Lilongwe, which also serves as the capital of the district and region.

The town is located in the heart of Lilongwe, approximately 5 kilometers from the city center. It is bounded by Area 9 to the north, Area 11 to the south, and the Lilongwe River to the east.

== History ==
The town has a history dating back to the colonial era, when it was established as a residential area for British expatriates. After Malawi gained independence in 1964, the area continued to grow, with many government officials and businessmen building homes and offices there.

== Nearby places and towns ==
Area 10 is close to several nearby places and towns, including:

- Area 9
- Area 11
- City Centre
- Lilongwe Old Town
- Kanengo

== Institutions ==
Area 10 is home to several institutions, including:

- Area 10 Hospital
- Malawi Revenue Authority
- Area 10 Secondary School
- Area 10 Primary School

== Places of interest ==
Some popular places of interest in Area 10 include:

- The Area 10 Golf Course
- The Area 10 Market
- The Old Town Mall

== See also ==
- Lilongwe
- Mzuzu
