= Area 11, Lilongwe =

Town in Lilongwe District, Malawi

- Location within Malawi
- Coordinates: 13°59′S 33°48′E
- Country: Malawi
- Region: Central Region, Malawi
- Municipality: Lilongwe District
- Established: 1970

Area
  - Total: 20 km^{2} (7.7 sq mi)

Population (2018)
  - Total: 17,300
  - Density: 860/km^{2} (2,200/sq mi)

Racial makeup (2018)
  - Black African: 88.0%
  - Asian: 4.0%
  - White: 3.0%
  - Mixed: 3.0%
  - Other: 4.0%

First languages (2018)
  - Chewa: 48.5%
  - Tumbuka: 16.5%
  - Yao: 11.2%
  - Lomwe: 8.3%
  - Sena: 6.0%
  - Tonga: 2.2%
  - Mang'anja: 2.0%
  - Ngonde: 1.0%
  - Other: 4.3%
- Time zone: UTC+2
- Postal code: 4000
- Post-office box: 4440

Area 11 is a residential and commercial area located in the heart of Lilongwe, the capital city of Malawi. The town is known for its rich history, cultural significance, and modern amenities. The town has nearby areas such as Area 24, 18 and 25.

== History ==
Area 11 was established in the 1970 as a residential area for middle-income families. During the colonial era, it was a small settlement for African civil servants. After Malawi gained independence in 1964, the town experienced rapid growth and development, becoming a hub for commerce, industry, and entertainment.

== Notable residents ==
- Ken Kandodo, musician and composer
- Jane Ansah, former chairperson of the Malawi Electoral Commission
- Lazarus Chakwera, former President of Malawi

== Location ==
Area 11 is situated in the central region of Lilongwe, approximately 3 kilometers from the city center. It is bordered by the Lilongwe River to the north and the Area 10 township to the south.

== Nearby places and towns ==
Area 11 is surrounded by several nearby places and towns, including:

- Lilongwe City Center
- Area 10
- Area 9
- Kanengo
- Kawale

== Institutions ==
Area 11 is home to several institutions, including:

- The Malawi Institute of Management
- The Lilongwe Chamber of Commerce and Industry
- The Area 11 Community Center
- The Lilongwe Public Library

== Places of interest ==
Area 11 has several places of interest, including:

- Lilongwe Golf Course
- Area 11 Shopping Center
- Lilongwe Tobacco Auction Floors
- Malawi National Museum
- Lilongwe Botanical Gardens

== Education ==
Area 11 has several schools and educational institutions, including:

- Lilongwe Girls Secondary School
- Lilongwe Boys Secondary School
- Malawi University of Science and Technology

== See also ==
- Lilongwe
- Mzuzu
