= Leston Muli =

Malawian businessman

- Born: Phalombe District, Malawi
- Education: Master of Business Administration
- Alma mater: University of Malawi
- Occupation: Entrepreneur
- Known for: Founding Mulli Brothers Limited (MBL)

Leston Muli (born 1974) is a Malawian business tycoon and philanthropist. He is the CEO and managing director of Mulli Brothers Limited (MBL) Holdings.

In August 2011, Muli lost over US$4.2 million following the looting of violent protestors in the 20 July nationwide in Malawi.

== Background ==
=== Early life and education ===
Muli was born in 1965 in Horo, Nyezerera Village, Traditional Authority Kaduya in Phalombe District in a family of six. He did his secondary studies at Phalombe Secondary School in Phalombe District. Muli holds a degree obtained from the University of Malawi.

== Career ==
Muli is the managing director of Mulli Brothers Limited (MBL).

== Controversies and cases ==
In 2013, Muli sued the Malawi government for property damage caused by violent protestors in the 20 July nationwide. The Malawi government was found guilty and was ordered by High Court of Malawi in Blantyre to pay Muli about K1.5 billion as a result.

In July 2018, Chief Ngolongoliwa said Kaliati was accusing Mulli of dating her daughter.

In 2015, Muli lost his temper at Malawian journalist when he was asked why he did not attend the cultural Mulhako wa Alhomwe.

In 2018, Muli threatened to kill Malawian activist, Charles Kajoloweka, for asking government authorities to investigate the K12 billion that he was involved in.

In 2022, Muli was arrested and the bailed over a connection to the alleged involvement in the settlement of the loan to have Muli Brothers Limited (MBL) pay MK5 billion after 50 years.

== See also ==
- Thom Mpinganjira
- Edgar Chibaka
- Abraham Simama
