= Simama Hotel =

Hotel in Lilongwe Malawi

- Alternative names: Hotel Simama
- Etymology: The neighborhood of Lilongwe

General information
- Type: Hotel
- Location: Falls Estates, Area 1, Lilongwe Malawi
- Coordinates: 13°57′S 33°47′E
- Construction started: 2013
- Opened: 2015
- Owner: Abraham Simama

Height
- Height: 140 ft (43 m)

Technical details
- Floor count: 17
- Grounds: 14,111 ft^{2} (1,311.0 m^{2})

Other information
- Number of rooms: 52

Simama Hotel is a hotel located in Lilongwe, Malawi. It is the country's biggest and most notable hotel after the Sun Bird chain of hotels. The hotel provides facilities and services for the local and middle class business, as well as leisure travelers. The hotel was launched by the Minister of Information, Civic Education and Tourism, Jappie Mhango. The building cost up to MK3.6 (Malawian Kwacha).

It is owned by Abraham Simama.

The hotel was built as part of boosting tourism in the city. In 2021, the 7th National Men's Championship of Malawi and 1st Women's Championship was conducted at the hotel from 28 to 30 May 2021. In 2016, the hotel donated bags of maize to the less fortunate.

== Location ==
The hotel is located along Falls Estates in Lilongwe. It is close to Lilongwe Girls Secondary School and Falls Baptist Private Secondary School. Its nearby places include Lilongwe City Mall, Lilongwe Girls Cemetery, Lilongwe Golf Course and Lilongwe Wildlife Centre.
