= Area 44, Lilongwe =

Town in Lilongwe District, Malawi

Area 24, Lilongwe
- Location within Malawi
- Coordinates: 13°59′S 33°46′E
- Country: Malawi
- Region: Central Region, Malawi
- Municipality: Lilongwe District
- Established: 1970

Area
  - Total: 11 km^{2} (4.2 sq mi)

Population (2018)
  - Total: 30,900
  - Density: 2,800/km^{2} (7,300/sq mi)

Racial makeup (2018)
  - Black African: 89.0%
  - Asian: 3.0%
  - White Malawians: 2.0%
  - Mixed: 1.0%
  - Other: 5.0%

First languages (2018)
  - Chewa: 50.5%
  - Tumbuka: 13.5%
  - Yao: 9.2%
  - Lomwe: 8.3%
  - Sena: 7.0%
  - Tonga: 2.2%
  - Mang'anja: 2.0%
  - Ngonde: 1.0%
  - Other: 6.3%
- Time zone: UTC+2
- Postal code: 4000
- Post-office box: 4440

Area 44 is a residential town west of Lilongwe, Malawi and forms part of the Lilongwe municipality. Institutions found in Area 44 include Area 44 College, Area 44 Secondary School and Area 44 Technical Centre. Police used tear gas in January 2024 to disperse a mob. There was a case of assault that resulted in three women going to jail.

== Institutions ==
- Sun Bird Hotel
- Area 44 Primary School
- Area 44 Technical Centre
- Area 44 College
- Area 44 Secondary School
- Waste Management Hub
- Area 44 CCAP Church

== Industry ==
Area 24 is one of the smaller industrial nodes of Lilongwe city and although many industries are scattered around the town. Notable industries that operate from Area 44 include:

- Lilongwe Water Board Branch
- Universal Industries

== See also ==
- Lilongwe
