= Kanengo, Lilongwe =

Town in Lilongwe District, Malawi

- Location within Malawi
- Coordinates: 13°58′S 33°48′E
- Country: Malawi
- Region: Central Region, Malawi
- Municipality: Lilongwe District
- Established: 1960

Area
  - Total: 50 km^{2} (19 sq mi)

Population (2018)
  - Total: 12,855
  - Density: 260/km^{2} (670/sq mi)

Racial makeup (2018)
  - Black African: 89.2%
  - Asian: 2.4%
  - White: 1.2%
  - Mixed: 5.1%
  - Other: 4.1%

First languages (2018)
  - Chewa: 47.5%
  - Tumbuka: 18.5%
  - Yao: 12.2%
  - Lomwe: 8.3%
  - Sena: 6.0%
  - Tonga: 2.2%
  - Mang'anja: 2.0%
  - Ngonde: 1.0%
  - Other: 4.3%
- Time zone: UTC+2
- Postal code: 4000
- Post-office box: 4440

Kanengo is a township located in the northern part of Lilongwe, the capital city of Malawi. It is situated approximately 10 kilometers north of the city center.

== History ==
=== Establishment ===
Kanengo was established in the 1960s as a residential area for low- to middle-income families. During the colonial era, it was a small settlement for African civil servants and businessmen. After Malawi gained independence in 1964, Kanengo experienced rapid growth and development, becoming a hub for commercial and social activities.

== Institutions ==
Some of the notable institutions found in Kanengo include:

- Kanengo Secondary School
- Kanengo Primary School
- Kanengo Health Centre
- Kanengo Police Station
- Kanengo Market
- Malawi Institute of Management

== Tourist Places ==
- Kanengo Pottery
- Kanengo Craft Village
- Kanengo Nature Reserve
- Kanengo Rock Paintings
- Kanengo Museum
- Kanengo Shopping Center
- Kanengo Fuel Station
- Kanengo Bus Depot
- Kanengo Mosque
- Kanengo Church

== Recreational centers ==
- Kanengo Sports Club
- Kanengo Tennis Court
- Kanengo Swimming Pool
- Kanengo Gym
- Kanengo Playground

== See also ==
- Lilongwe
- Mzuzu
