= Lomwe =

Lomwe may refer to:

- Lomwe language
- Lomwe people
