= Area 25, Lilongwe =

Town in Lilongwe District, Malawi

- Location within Malawi
- Coordinates: 13°59′S 33°45′E
- Country: Malawi
- Region: Central Region, Malawi
- Municipality: Lilongwe District
- Established: 1969

Area
  - Total: 11 km^{2} (4.2 sq mi)

Population (2018)
  - Total: 50,367
  - Density: 4,600/km^{2} (12,000/sq mi)

Racial makeup (2018)
  - Black African: 87.0%
  - Asian: 4.0%
  - White Malawians: 3.0%
  - Mixed: 2.0%
  - Other: 5.0%

First languages (2018)
  - Chewa: 48.2%
  - Tumbuka: 14.5%
  - Yao: 10.5%
  - Lomwe: 8.3%
  - Sena: 8.0%
  - Tonga: 1.2%
  - Mang'anja: 2.0%
  - Ngonde: 1.0%
  - Other: 6.3%
- Time zone: UTC+2
- Postal code: 4000
- Post-office box: 4440

Area 25 is a residential town west of Lilongwe District, Malawi and forms part of the Lilongwe municipality. The Traditional Authority of the area is Chief Chitukula.

Institutions found in Area 25 include Area 25 Health Centre, Area 25 Secondary School and Area 25 Technical Centre. Other areas found in Lilongwe include Area 44, Area 24 and other similar areas.

== Institutions ==
- Area 25 health Centre
- Area 25 Technical Centre
- Dzenza Secondary School
- Dzenza CCAP Church
- Sun Bird Hotel

== Industry ==
Area 25 is one of the smaller industrial nodes of Lilongwe city and although many industries are scattered around the town. Notable industries that operate from Area 25 include:

- Lilongwe Water Board Branch

== Incidents ==
In February 2024, Lawford Palani, the District Commissioner of Lilongwe assured the residents of the area that the council of Lilongwe would resolve issues of demolishing structures that were constructed within a graveyard.

== See also ==
- Lilongwe
- Area 44
- Area 24
- Luwinga
- Chibanja
- Mzuzu
