= Area 25 =

Area 25 may refer to:

- Area 25 (Nevada National Security Site)
- Area 25, Lilongwe, a town in Malawi
- Brodmann area 25, an area of the brain's cerebral cortex
