= Asiyati Chiweza =

Malawian writer and academic

Assoc Prof Asiyati Lorraine Chiweza

Asiyati Lorraine Chiweza is a Malawian academic and public administration scholar. Chiweza became a professor of public administration at the University of Malawi and the first Director General of the Malawi School of Government. Her research focuses on decentralization and local governance in Malawi.

== Early life and education ==
Chiweza was the seventh of ten children and she grew up in Naperi Township in Blantyre. Her parents were successful entrepreneurs with limited formal education. She attended St Pius Girls' Secondary School and Providence Secondary School, and she completed her Secondary education in 1984. She went to Chancellor College, graduating in 1988 as a Bachelor of Social Science.

In 1993 she received a scholarship from the International Development Research Centre to study for a Master in Public Administration at Dalhousie University in Canada, which she completed in 1995. She later earned a PhD at Curtin University in Western Australia, with a thesis titled 'Democracy, Decentralization and Development in Malawi'.

== Career ==
Chiweza worked in the finance office of the University of Malawi's central administration, rising to assistant finance officer. She joined the Department of Political and Administrative studies at Chancellor College as a lecturer in 1996. She was later promoted to senior lecturer and associate professor and served as head of the department. In 2023 she was promoted to full professor of public administration. The Nation described her as Malawi's first female professor in the field.

=== Malawi School of Government ===
In February 2023, Chiweza was appointed the first director general of the Malawi School of Government. She was seconded from the University of Malawi to set up and lead the new institution. She served in this role for 39 months before returning to the University of Malawi. She was succeeded by Professor Lewis Dzimbiri. Before she left Chiweza had devised an eight month leadership programme for women leaders that would take part at the school. The HER RISE Executive programme will see women students implement their learning within their own organisations.

=== Research ===
Chiweza's research covers decentralisation and local governance, local government management, public policy, public financial management and public sector reform, with an interest in gender and governance. She has also worked as a consultant on citizen participation, advocacy and gender analysis.

=== Awards and recognition ===
Chiweza received an Australian Postgraduate Research Scholarship in 2003 for her doctoral studies and a World Bank Robert McNamara research award supported her early research on fiscal decentralisation.

=== Personal Life ===
Chiweza is married to the librarian Diston Chiweza and they have four daughters.
