= Koti language =

Bantu language spoken in Mozambique

Koti
- Ekoti
- Pronunciation: [ekot̪i]
- Native to: Mozambique
- Region: Koti Island and Angoche, Nampula Province
- Ethnicity: Makua
- Native speakers: 100,000 (2006)
- Language family: Niger–Congo?: Atlantic–Congo; Benue–Congo; Bantoid; Bantu; Southern Bantu; Makua; Koti
- Dialects: Nathembo (Sakati/Sangaji)

Language codes
- ISO 639-3: eko
- Glottolog: koti1238
- Guthrie code: P.311, P.312

The Koti language, or Ekoti (pronounced [ekot̪i]), is a Bantu language spoken in Mozambique by about 100,000 people. Koti is spoken in the area surrounding Koti Island and is the major language of Angoche, the capital of the district with the same name in the province of Nampula.

In terms of genetic classification, Koti is generally considered to belong to the Makhuwa group (P.30 in Guthrie's classification). A large portion of its vocabulary however derives from a past variety of Swahili, today the lingua franca of much of East Africa's coast. This Swahili influence is usually attributed to traders from Kilwa or elsewhere on the Zanzibar Coast, who in the fifteenth century settled at Angoche. Arends et al. suggest it might turn out to be a Makhua–Swahili mixed language.

== Geography and demography ==
The place name Koti refers primarily to the island. An older form is [ŋɡoji]; this form with the class 2 nominal prefix a for 'people' gave rise to the Portuguese name Angoche. The much older local African name of Angoche, still in use, is Parápaátho. Angoche was probably established in the fifteenth century by dissidents from Kilwa. In the centuries that followed, it flourished as a part of the Indian Ocean trading network.

About nine Koti villages are found in the coastal areas of Koti island; these are usually accessed by boat. Much of the coastline is covered by mangrove woods (khava). On the mainland, there are about five other Koti villages, all in the vicinity of Angoche. The main economic activity of men in the villages is fishing; the catch is sold on the markets of Angoche. People keep chickens and some goats.

In Makhuwa, the dominant regional language of much of northern Mozambique, the Koti are called Maka, just like other coastal Muslim communities that were part of the Indian Ocean trading network. Most Koti have at least some knowledge of Makhuwa or one of its neighbouring dialects; this extensive bilinguality has had considerable influence on the Koti language in recent years.

== Phonology ==
=== Vowels ===
Koti has five vowels. The open vowels ɛ and ɔ are normally written e and o. The high vowels i and u do not occur word-initially. There is a restricted form of vowel harmony in verbal bases which causes /u/ in verbal extensions to be rendered as [o] after another /o/; thus, the separative extensions -ul- and -uw- appear as -ol- and -ow- after the vowel o. Furthermore, a distributional analysis shows that /o/ tends to occur mainly after another /o/, and only rarely after the other vowels.

	Front	Back
Close	i	u
Open-mid	ɛ	ɔ
Open	a	

Vowel length is contrastive in Koti, except in word-final position. Long vowels are best treated as two tone-bearing units. Several vowel coalescence processes do take place, within words as well as across morpheme boundaries: mathápá mawíxí apa → mathápá mawíx'áapa 'these green leaves' (the apostrophe shows the location of coalescence). In case of word-final 'i' it is sometimes accompanied with glide formation: olíli áka → olíly'aáka 'my bed'.

=== Consonants ===
The table below shows the consonant inventory of Koti.

Voiced stops are rather infrequent overall, and they tend to occur after a homorganic, tone-bearing nasal. Additionally, voiced stops often vary with their voiceless unaspirated counterparts.

		Labial	Dental	Alveolar	Retroflex	Palatal	Velar	Glottal
Nasal		m		n		ɲ ⟨ny⟩		
Plosive	voiceless	p	t̪		ʈ ⟨tt⟩	c	k	
Plosive	voiced	b	d̪		ɖ ⟨dd⟩	ɟ ⟨j⟩	g	
Plosive	aspirated	pʰ ⟨ph⟩	t̪ʰ ⟨th⟩		ʈʰ ⟨tth⟩	cʰ ⟨ch⟩	kʰ ⟨kh⟩	
Fricative	voiceless	f	ð ⟨dh⟩ (Note: The only example of ⟨dh⟩ in S&M's corpus is adhuhuri 'second prayer in the morning', which is a variation of aduhuri.)	s		ʃ ⟨x⟩		h
Fricative	voiced	v		z		ʒ ⟨zh⟩ (Note: ⟨zh⟩ occurs only in some recent loans from Portuguese)		
Trill				r				
Approximant				l		j ⟨y⟩ (Note: The two glides ⟨w⟩ and ⟨y⟩ are only phonemically contrastive in certain contexts; in some other contexts, they can be derived from vowels.)	w	

Words in Koti show incompatibility of aspirated consonants; this phenomenon is dubbed Katupha's Law in Schadeberg (1999), and is found in related Makhuwa languages as well. If two aspirated consonants are brought together in one stem, the first such consonant loses its aspiration. The effect is particularly clear in reduplicated words: kopikophi 'eyelash'; piriphiri 'pepper' (cf. Swahili 'piripiri'); okukuttha 'to wipe'. Another incompatibility concerns dental and retroflex consonants, which never occur together within a stem, and usually assimilate when brought together. Consider the class 1 demonstrative for example: o-tthu-o-tu becomes othuutu under influence of the dentral-retroflex incompatibility.

=== Tone ===
Koti, like most Bantu languages, is a register tone language with two tones: High and Low. Tone is not lexically distinctive for verbs, but it is very important in verbal inflection and in some other parts of grammar. Contour tones (falling and rising tones) do occur, but only on long vowels, therefore they are analysed as sequences of the H and L level tones. There is a process of High Doubling which spreads any H tone to the following tone bearing unit, and a process of Final Lowering which deletes any utterance-final High tone. Both can be seen in effect in the following example (Low tone is unmarked): kaláwa 'boat', kaláwá khuúlu 'the biggest boat'. In kaláwa, High doubling is canceled because Final Lowering applies, so the last syllable has a Low tone. In the second example, the first H tone in kaláwá has spread to the next syllable (High Doubling) and Final Lowering again causes the last syllable of the utterance to be Low in tone.

== Morphosyntax ==
Koti has a typical Bantu noun class system, in which every noun belongs to a nominal class which class markers throughout the sentence are in agreement with. Classes pair up in 'genders' for the derivation of plurals. Verbal words consist of a stem to which various morphemes and clitics can be affixed.

== Notes ==
1. Mucanheia 1997 as cited in Schadeberg & Mucanheia (henceforth S&M) 2000:4.
2. S&M, p. 7 cite Newitt 1995 as saying that these traders, probably from Kilwa, established Angoche; however, they do not exclude the possibility of a much earlier Swahili settlement in Angoche.
3. See note 2 above.
4. S&M, 17-8.
5. S&M, 19.
6. Adapted from S&M, 10. Symbols are given according to the orthography used in S&M; IPA transcriptions are provided where the symbols differ from their IPA value. Where symbols appear in pairs, the one to the right represents the voiced consonant.
