= Area 44 =

Area 44 may refer to

- Municipal District of Rocky View No. 44, now named Rocky View County, Alberta
- Brodmann area 44, or BA44, part of the frontal cortex in the human brain
- Area 44, Lilongwe
