= VMW =

VMW may refer to:

- ISO 639:vmw, the ISO 639-3 code for the Makhuwa language
- VMware, the New York Stock Exchange code VMW
- VMW (radio station)
