= Malawi School of Government =

Malawi School of Government in Lilongwe

- Former name: Malawi Institute of Management
- Established: 2022
- Location: Lilongwe, Malawi; 13.872°S 33.8°E
- Website: msg.ac.mw

The Malawi School of Government was formed in 2022 by merging the Malawi Institute of Management with the Staff Development Institute. Its founding executive director was Asiyati Chiweza. In 2026 she was succeeded by Professor Lewis Dzimbiri.

== History ==
The Malawi Institute of Management was created in 1989 to supply government leadership training, consultancy and research.

It is based in the capital city in Kanengo, Lilongwe. The purpose built buildings include conference areas, syndicate and computer rooms and a learning resource center. In addition there was accommodation and sports facilities for over 60 students.

In 2007 the University of Bolton partnered to help support post graduate courses. Students can take a number of post graduate qualifications including an MBA.

In 2022 the Acting Executive Director, Samson Sikelo Phiri was accused of financial mismanagement over a 20m kwacha loss. Jessie Kabwila became the acting Executive Director of the Malawi Institute of Management. Phiri was cleared in September 2022 but while he was suspended his contract had lapsed. Kabwila was left as acting Executive Director.

The Malawi School of Government was formed in 2022 as the result of an act of parliament (Malawi School of Government Act). The school was created by merging the Malawi Institute of Management with the Staff Development Institute. The new body began operation on 1 December 2022. Three months later in February 2023, Asiyati Chiweza was appointed the first director general of the Malawi School of Government. She was seconded from the University of Malawi to set up and lead the new institution. She served in this role for 39 months before returning to the University of Malawi in 2026. She was succeeded by Professor Lewis Dzimbiri. Before she left she was able to witness the launch of an eight month leadership programme for women leaders at the school. The HER RISE Executive programme will see students implement their learning within their own organisations.

The school organised training for sitting MPs in 2026 in order that they could show due diligence to government projects. The first deputy Speaker of the house, Victor Musowa, assured members that they needed to attend. Moreover he said it was expected that they would demonstrating their learning and not just displaying the certicate. MIM's course director Christine Siame believed that the new skills would contribute towards "the development of our nation".
