= Mpinganjira =

Mpinganjira is a surname. Notable people with the surname include:

- Beatrice Mpinganjira (fl. from 2009), Malawian netball player and trainer
- Brown Mpinganjira (born 1950), Malawian politician
- Thom Mpinganjira (fl. early 21st century), Malawian businessman
