= Area 9, Lilongwe =

Town in Lilongwe District, Malawi

- Location within Malawi
- Coordinates: 13°59′S 33°48′E
- Country: Malawi
- Region: Central Region, Malawi
- Municipality: Lilongwe District
- Established: 1974

Area
  - Total: 20 km^{2} (7.7 sq mi)

Population (2018)
  - Total: 9,900
  - Density: 500/km^{2} (1,300/sq mi)

Racial makeup (2018)
  - Black African: 90.2%
  - Asian: 1.4%
  - White: 1.2%
  - Mixed: 5.1%
  - Other: 4.1%

First languages (2018)
  - Chewa: 47.5%
  - Tumbuka: 17.5%
  - Yao: 11.2%
  - Lomwe: 8.3%
  - Sena: 6.0%
  - Tonga: 2.2%
  - Mang'anja: 2.0%
  - Ngonde: 1.0%
  - Other: 4.3%
- Time zone: UTC+2
- Postal code: 4000
- Post-office box: 4440

Area 9 is a township located in the capital city of Lilongwe, Malawi. Area 9 is situated in the heart of Lilongwe, approximately 3 kilometers from the city center. It is bordered by the Lilongwe River to the north and the Area 10 township to the south.

== History ==
Area 9 was established in the 1970s as a residential area for low- to middle-income families. During the colonial era, it was a settlement for African civil servants and businessmen. After Malawi gained independence in 1964, Area 9 experienced rapid growth and development, becoming a hub for commercial and social activities.

== Nearby places and towns ==
Area 9 is surrounded by several nearby places and towns, including:

- Lilongwe City Center
- Area 10
- Area 12
- Kanengo
- Kawale

== Institutions ==
Area 9 is home to several institutions, including:

- Lilongwe City Assembly
- Lilongwe Police Station
- Area 9 Clinic
- Lilongwe Private School
- Area 9 Market

== Places of interest ==
Area 9 has several places of interest, including:

- Lilongwe National Stadium
- Area 9 Shopping Center
- Lilongwe Golf Course
- Malawi National Museum

== Education ==
Area 9 has several schools and educational institutions, including:

- Area 9 Secondary School
- Area 9 Primary School

== See also ==
- Lilongwe
- Mzuzu
