= Malawi Lomwe language =

Lomwe language of Malawi

Malawi Lomwe
- Anguru, Nguru
- Elhomwe
- Native to: Malawi
- Native speakers: 2,290,000 (2012)
- Language family: Niger–Congo?: Atlantic-Congo; Volta-Congo; Benue-Congo; Bantoid; Southern Bantoid; Bantu; Southern Bantu; Makua; Lomwe; Malawi Lomwe
- Writing system: Latin script Mwangwego script

Language codes
- ISO 639-3: lon
- Glottolog: mala1256
- Guthrie code: P.331

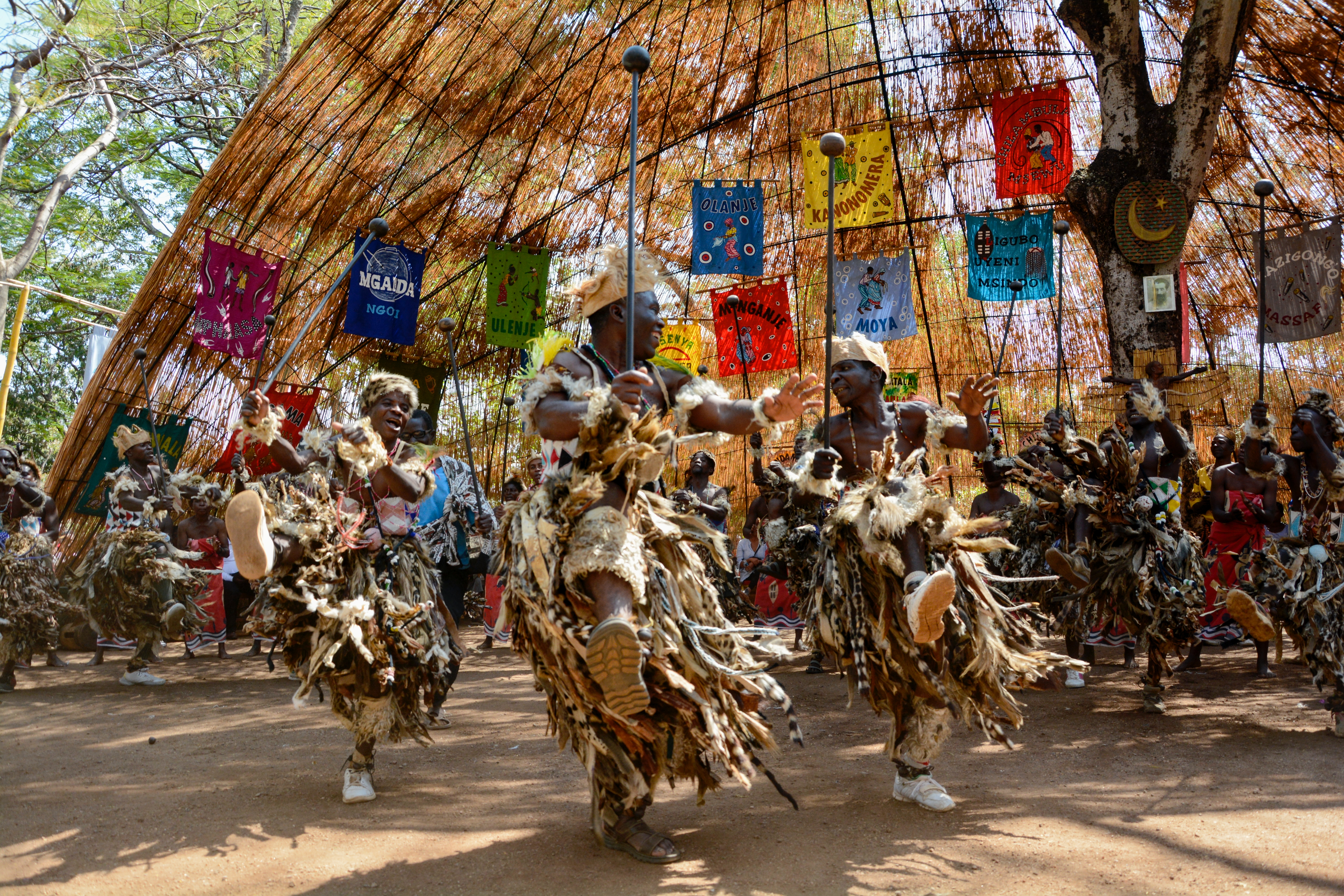
Malawian dance

Malawi Lomwe, also known as Elhomwe or Ellomwe, is a dialect of the Lomwe language spoken in southeastern Malawi in parts of Mulanje and Thyolo.

== Background ==
The Lomwe is one of the three largest languages of Malawi after Chewa and Chitumbuka. Many Lomwes moved into Malawi towards the end of the 19th century due to tribal wars in Mozambique.

The Elhomwe language spoken in Malawi is to a large extent a Mihavane dialect. Just like all major tribes of Malawi, the Lhomwes are not natives of Malawi but the Akafula also known as the Mwandionelapati or Abathwa, were the original natives of Malawi.

Although the Elhomwe dialect spoken in Malawi is not mutually intelligible with other dialects of Lomwe spoken in Mozambique, it shares many characteristics and much vocabulary. For instance, one could note the similarities in the following word forms: otchuna (Emakhuwa), onthuna (Lmeetto), and ohuna (Elhomwe) meaning "to want." Similarly, the words for "women" are anamwaani (Emakhuwa and Elhomwe), and anumwane (Lmeetto).

Lomwe (Elhomwe) is a tonal language, with high-toned syllables (H) contrasting with toneless ones. In nouns there is a limited degree of unpredictability in the position of the H tone, particularly in words borrowed from other Bantu languages. In verbs there is no tonal distinction between one verb-root and another (i.e. no distinction between high and low-toned verbs as in some other Bantu languages), but in the dialect they study (Emihavani) Kisseberth & Mtenje identify a variety of tonal patterns associated with different tenses. For example, the conjoint past continuous has H tone at the beginning of the macrostem (e.g. y-a-vítikelela mi-kwé "they were twisting ropes"), the negative subjunctive has H tone on the verb final (o-hi-vitikelelé "you should not twist"), and so on.

== The bible ==
Lewis Mataka Bandawe worked on a translation of the New Testament into the Lomwe language with E.D. Bowman. Bandawe led the Mihecani Mission until 1928 and during that time the four gospels and Acts were published in Lomwe.

== Relevant literature ==
- Kapyepye, Mavuto. Lhomwe Proverbs: A collection of 200 African proverbs in the Lhomwe language of Malawi. Privately published, via Amazon.

== Bibliography ==
- Boerder, R.B. (1984) Silent Majority: A History of the Lomwe in Malawi. Pretoria: Africa Institute of South Africa.
- Kayambazinthu, Edrinnie (1998). "The Language Planning Situation in Malawi". Journal of Multilingual and Multicultural Development, vol. 19, no. 5–6..
- Kisseberth, Charles W; Mtenje, Al. (2022). "Melodic High tones in Emihavani". Stellenbosch Papers in Linguistics Plus, Vol. 62(2), 2022, 1-33.
- Murray, S.S. (1932) [1910] Handbook of Nyasaland. Zomba: Government Printer.
- Rashid, P.R. (1978) "Originally Lomwe, culturally Maravi, and linguistically Yao: The rise of the Mbewe c. 1760–1840". Seminar paper, History Department, Chancellor College, University of Malawi, Zomba.
- Soka, L.D. (1953) Mbiri ya a Lomwe (The History of the Lomwe). London: MacMillan.
- Vail, L. and White, L. (1989) "Tribalism in the political history of Malawi". In L. Vail (ed.) The Creation of Tribalism in Southern Africa (pp. 151–192). London: James Currey.
