= Leda Hugo =

Mozambican agronomist, politician (FRELIMO) and vice-minister

Leda Florida Hugo (born 4 January 1963) is a Mozambican agronomist and politician who has served as a deputy minister since 2010.

== Early life and education ==
Hugo was born in Namapa, Nampula Province on 4 January 1963. She attended primary school in Ocua in Cabo Delgado Province and secondary school in Nampula. She studied agronomy at the Eduardo Mondlane University in Maputo, graduating in 1986. She obtained a master's degree from Texas A&M University, College Station and a doctorate from the University of Pretoria in South Africa.

== Career ==
In 1994, Hugo began working at the Eduardo Mondlane University, leading the training in agronomy. From 2001 to 2006 she led the rural engineering program and in 2008 she was in charge of the university's pedagogical direction.

Hugo is a member of the Liberation Front of Mozambique. In 2010, she was appointed to the cabinet by President Armando Guebuza as Deputy Minister of Education.

Following the 2014 election, Hugo became Deputy Minister for Science, Technology, Higher and Professional Education in the cabinet of Filipe Nyusi.

== Personal life ==
Hugo is divorced and has two children. She is Muslim and speaks Makua, Portuguese and English.

== Publications ==
- Waniska, Ralph D.; Hugo, Leda F.; Rooney, Lloyd W. (1992). "Practical Methods to Determine the Presence of Tannins in Sorghum". Journal of Applied Poultry Research. 1 (1): 122–128. doi:10.1093/japr/1.1.122.
- Hugo, Leda F.; Rooney, Lloyd W.; Taylor, John R. N. (2003). "Fermented sorghum as a functional ingredient in composite breads". Cereal Chemistry. 80 (5): 495–499. doi:10.1094/CCHEM.2003.80.5.495.
