= Lolo language =

Lolo may be

- Lolo language (Bantu)
- any of several Loloish languages
