= Mulhako wa Alhomwe =

Annual cultural festival of the Lhomwe people in Malawi

- Status: Active
- Genre: Cultural festival
- Frequency: Annually
- Venue: Chonde Cultural Village, Mulanje
- Country: Malawi
- Inaugurated: Around 2011 (annual event); association founded 2007-08
- Attendance: Thousands (estimates)
- Patron: Peter Mutharika
- Organiser: Mulhako wa Alhomwe (trust for the Lhomwe people)

Mulhako wa Alhomwe (sometimes written Mulhako wa a Lhomwe or Mulhakho wa Alhomwe) is an annual cultural festival held by the Lhomwe people (also spelled Lomwe) in Malawi. The festival is organised by a cultural association of the same name, which seeks to preserve, promote and celebrate Lhomwe heritage, language and traditions.

== History ==
The Mulhako wa Alhomwe cultural association was founded between 2007 and 2008 under the patronage of then State President Bingu wa Mutharika, formally launching in 2008 to serve as a “gateway” for Lhomwe cultural identity. The name “Mulhako” means “door” in Chilomwe language, thus symbolising the association’s role as a doorway to Lhomwe culture.

The festival is held annually, typically in the month of October, at the association’s headquarters in Chonde, Mulanje District, in Southern Malawi.

== Purpose and significance ==
The festival is designed to revive and sustain Lhomwe cultural traditions which had been marginalised, including the Chilomwe language, traditional dances (such as the tchopa dance), crafts, cuisine and oral heritage. It also serves as a focal point for cultural pride, community identity and inter-generational transmission of Lhomwe heritage.

In recent editions, the organisers have incorporated social themes such as addressing youth challenges (including drug abuse and suicide) through culture and unity. Moreover, the festival is open to participants beyond the Lhomwe community and is cited as one of Malawi’s most celebrated cultural gatherings, contributing to cultural tourism and national heritage.

== Activities and features ==
During the festival, attendees can expect:

- Traditional dance and music performances showcasing Lhomwe heritage.
- Exhibitions of Lhomwe crafts, clothing, tools and arts reflecting indigenous knowledge and material culture.
- Displays of traditional Lhomwe cuisine (for example cassava‐based dishes) and local brews.
- Oral recitations, storytelling, and language classes or demonstrations in Chilomwe.
- Speeches by cultural leaders, community elders and sometimes national dignitaries, emphasising cultural revival and unity.

== Venue ==
The event takes place at the headquarters of the Mulhako wa Alhomwe trust in Chonde in the Mulanje District of Malawi.

== Recent developments ==
The 2020 edition of the festival was postponed due to the COVID-19 pandemic as gathering restrictions applied; the organisers publicly announced the suspension of that year’s event for safety reasons.

== Criticism and challenges ==
While the festival has been widely praised for cultural revitalisation, observers have noted that actual attendance figures are not reliably documented and that some of the funding comes from government support despite the festival’s stated non-political status.

== Cultural and national importance ==
The Mulhako wa Alhomwe festival is one of the key heritage events in Malawi, particularly for the Lhomwe ethnic group, contributing to cultural diversity, the preservation of intangible heritage and cross-cultural awareness in the country. It is listed among the country’s main cultural events in tourism and festival calendars.

== See also ==
- Lomwe language
- Culture of Malawi
