= Lilongwe City Centre =

Town in Lilongwe District, Malawi

- Location within Malawi
- Coordinates: 13°59′S 33°47′E
- Country: Malawi
- Region: Southern Region, Malawi
- Municipality: Lilongwe
- Established: 1902

Government
  - Type: Unitary presidential republic

Area
  - Total: 28.30 km^{2} (10.93 sq mi)

Population (2018)
  - Total: 39,994
  - Density: 1,413/km^{2} (3,660/sq mi)

Racial makeup (2018)
  - Black African: 80.1%
  - Asian: 10.4%
  - White: 5.2%
  - Mixed: 2.2%
  - Other: 2.1%

First languages (2018)
  - Chichewa: 49.6%
  - Chitumbuka: 19.1%
  - Yao: 7.0%
  - Lomwe: 6.1%
  - English: 3.1%
  - Other: 15.1%
- Time zone: UTC+2 (CAT)

Lilongwe City Centre is a township that is part of Lilongwe located in the central business district of Lilongwe, the capital city of Malawi. It is situated at the junction of the Old Town and the New City and serves as the commercial and administrative hub of the city.

== History ==
=== Formation ===
Lilongwe City Centre was established in 1902 as a small trading post by the local leader Njewa. It later became an administrative centre in 1904 and was officially recognized as a town in 1947. In 1975, Lilongwe replaced Zomba as the capital of Malawi, and the City Centre became the seat of government and commerce. The coordinates of Lilongwe City Centre are 13.9629° S and 33.7704° E.

== Institutions ==
The town is a hub of commerce, government, and culture, and offers a unique blend of traditional and modern attractions. Some of the notable institutions found in Lilongwe City Centre include:

- Malawi Parliament Building
- Lilongwe City Council
- Reserve Bank of Malawi
- Ministry of Finance
- Ministry of Education

== Tourist places ==
- Lilongwe National Museum
- Hastings Kamuzu Banda Statue
- Bingu International Conference Centre
- Lilongwe Old Town Hall
- Lilongwe Market
- Lilongwe City Mall

== Recreational centres ==
- Lilongwe Golf Course
- Lilongwe Tennis Club
- Lilongwe Sports Club
- Lilongwe Swimming Pool
- Lilongwe Gymkhana Club
- Sunbird Capital Hotel
- Lilongwe Hotel
- Old Town Mall

== See also ==
- Luwinga
