= Area 24, Lilongwe =

Town in Lilongwe District, Malawi

- Location within Malawi
- Coordinates: 13°59′S 33°48′E
- Country: Malawi
- Region: Central Region, Malawi
- Municipality: Lilongwe District
- Established: 1985

Area
  - Total: 10 km^{2} (3.9 sq mi)

Population (2018)
  - Total: 19,900
  - Density: 2,000/km^{2} (5,200/sq mi)

Racial makeup (2018)
  - Black African: 87.0%
  - Asian: 4.0%
  - White Malawians: 3.0%
  - Mixed: 2.0%
  - Other: 4.0%

First languages (2018)
  - Chewa: 50.5%
  - Tumbuka: 14.5%
  - Yao: 11.2%
  - Lomwe: 8.3%
  - Sena: 6.0%
  - Tonga: 2.2%
  - Mang'anja: 2.0%
  - Ngonde: 1.0%
  - Other: 4.3%
- Time zone: UTC+2
- Postal code: 4000
- Post-office box: 4440

Area 24 is a residential town east of Lilongwe City in Lilongwe District, Malawi and forms part of the Lilongwe municipality. Institutions found in Area 24 include Area 24 College, Area 24 Secondary School and Area 24 Technical Centre. Other neighborhoods of Area 24 include areas 22, 36, Biwi, and Falls.

== Institutions ==
- Crazmatic High School
- Area 24 Primary School
- Area 24 Technical Centre
- Area 24 Market
- Lilongwe International Academy
- Area 24 Secondary School
- Lilongwe Area 24 Club and Resthouse
- Waste Management Hub - Area 24, Lilongwe
- Nkhumbu Ccap Church

== Industry ==
Area 24 is one of the smaller industrial nodes of Lilongwe city and although many industries are scattered around the town. Notable industries that operate from Area 24 include:

- Lilongwe Foods
- Universal Industries

== See also ==
- Lilongwe
- Luwinga
- Chibanja
- Mzuzu
