= Makua people =

Bantu ethnic group of Mozambique and Tanzania

Makuwa
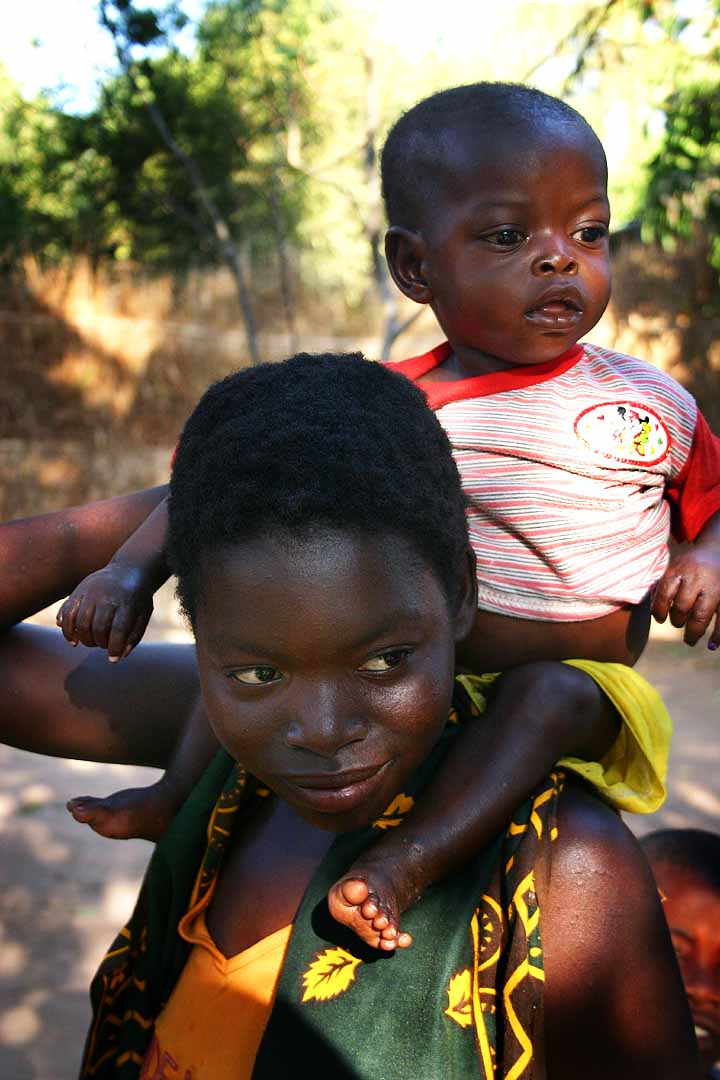
- A Makuwa mother and child in Mozambique.

Total population
- 8,486,103

Regions with significant populations
- East Africa
- Mozambique: 8,486,103 (26.1%) (Note: Makua speakers)

Languages
- Makhuwa, Portuguese, English (Tanzania)

Religion
- Traditional African religions, Islam (Sunni), Christianity (Roman Catholic)

Related ethnic groups
- other Bantu peoples, Afro-Arabs

The Makuwa people, also known as Makuwa or Wamakuwa, are a Bantu ethnic group found in northern Mozambique and the southern border provinces of Tanzania such as the Mtwara Region. They are the largest ethnic group in Mozambique, and primarily concentrated in a large region to the north of the Zambezi River.

They are studied by sociologists in four geographical and linguistic sub-divisions: the lower or Lolo Makua, the upper or Lomwe Makua, the Maua and the Niassa Makua or Medo. They speak variants of the Makua language, also called Emakua, and this is a Bantu-group language. The total Makua population is estimated to be about 3.5 million of which over 1 million speak the lower (southern) dialect and about 2 million the upper (northern, Lomwe) version; given the large region and population, several ethnic groups that share the region with the Makua people also speak the Emakua.

== History ==
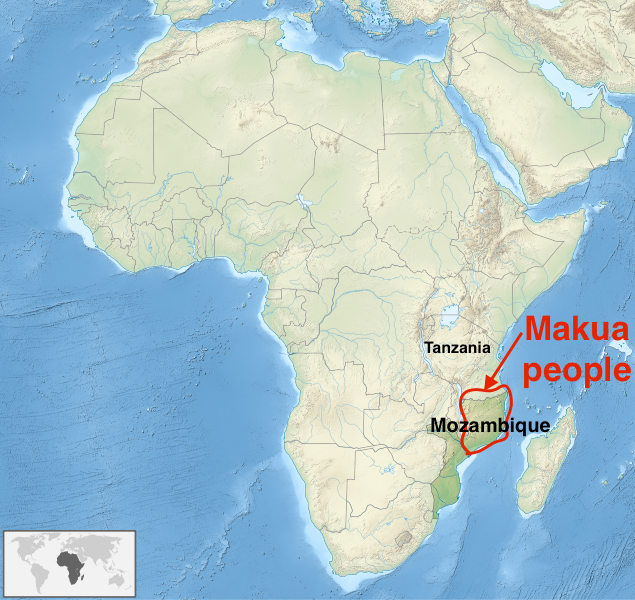
Geographic distribution of Makua people (approx)

A mythical legend, in the oral tradition of the Makua people, tells that their ancestor were the first man and woman born of Namuli which is their original home, while other living creatures came from nearby mountains. Scholars are uncertain whether their origins are in the mountains, or west of Lake Malawi, or northern lands such as in Tanzania or the south. However they concur that they likely have been an established ethnic group in northern Mozambique region by the 1st millennium CE. The Makua people are closely related to the Animist Maravi people. They have had a history of conflict with the Muslim Yao people in the north involved in slave raids and slave trading.

=== Metals, manufacturing and trade ===
The Makua people have a documented history of metal ore processing and tools manufacturing. The colonial era Portuguese naturalist, Manuel Galvao da Silva for example, described iron mines of the Makua people. Similarly, the French explorer Eugene de Froberville summarized the indigenous Makua iron manufacturing methods from iron ore, where the Makua people extracted the metal by processing the ore in a wood-burning hearth as a community. The extracted metal was then worked into axes, knives, spear, rings and other items.

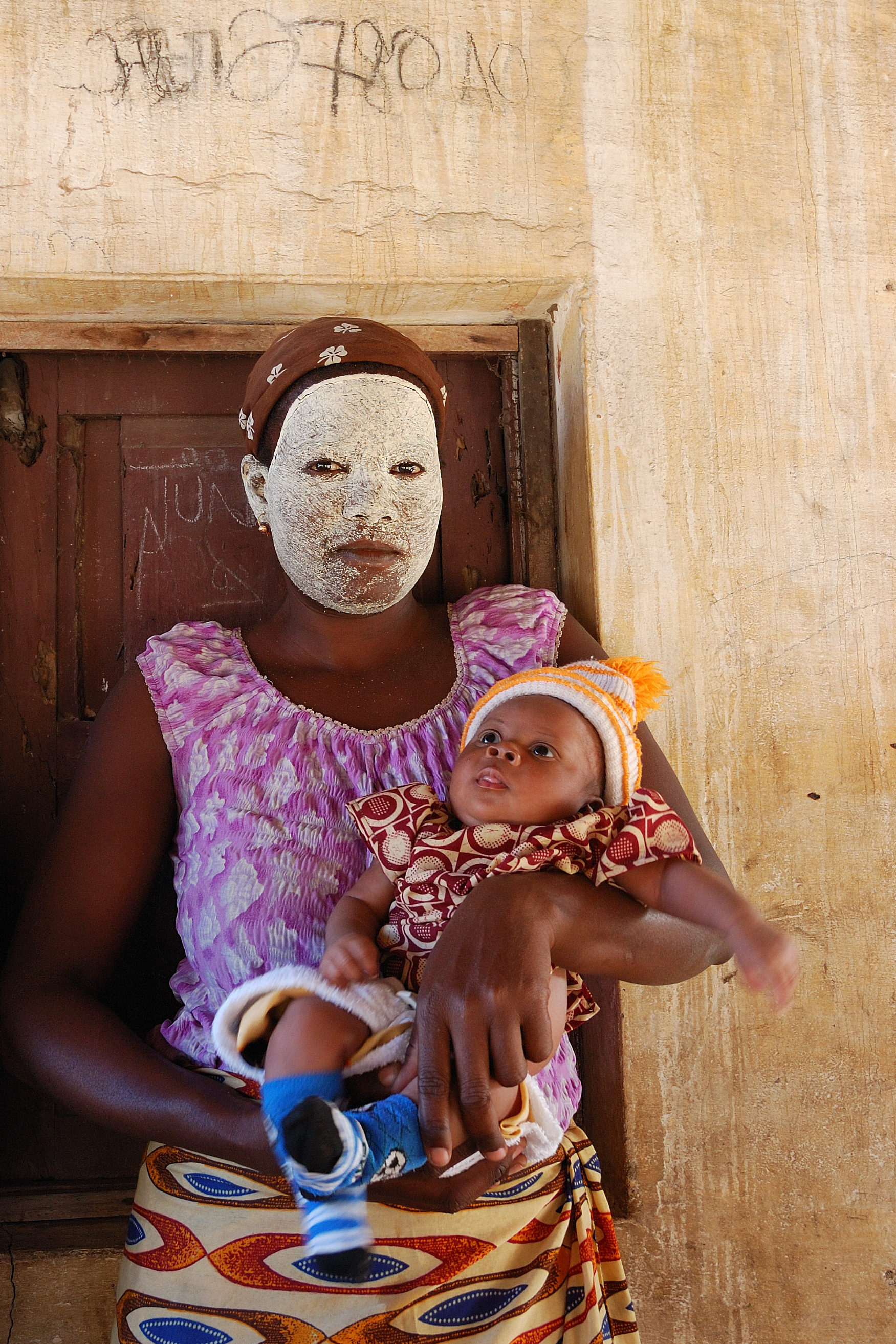
Musiro or n'siro is a traditional white paste mask applied by Makua women.

The Makua people have traditionally been dedicated to agriculture and hunting, yet medieval era documents suggest that the Makua people were also successful traders that controlled the trade routes between Lake Malawi and the Atlantic coast doing brisk business with the Swahili (East Africa) and Gujarati (India) merchants before the start of the colonial era. However, prior to the 18th-century, the Makua population was primarily exchanging food, ivory tusks and metal products for textiles, salt and other products, but they were not involved in the trade of ivory or gold. In the 18th century there was a dramatic increase in the ivory trade which required large scale killing of elephants. (Note: According to Newitt, the ivory trade had become so large that each caravan carrying ivory tusk had as many as 1,000 porters passing through Makua people lands.)

=== Colonialism and slavery ===
The Portuguese who arrived in Mozambique in early 16th-century describe them for their trading relationships and expertise. The colonial settlers contacted the Makua people in early 16th century. The Makua people were generally peaceful with the colonial Portuguese in 17th century and throughout the mid 18th century. The Makua people encountered slave raids and capture from their northern neighbors, specifically the Yao people, an African ethnic group who targeted them to meet the slave demand of Swahili Arabs centered around Zanzibar. The Makua people retaliated with a war of attrition from 1749 onwards, against the Arabic Sultans of the African coast bordering the Indian Ocean, the Portuguese and the other African ethnic groups that supported colonial interests.

In early 18th-century, states historian Edward Alpers, the primary demand for slaves out of Makua people, and Mozambique in general, came not from Portugal or its Indian Ocean colonies such as Goa because labor was readily available in South Asia and Portuguese colonial empire in Asia was small. The largest demand came from the 'Umani Arabs seeking slaves for domestic labor and the French who lacked plantation workers but controlled nearby island colonies such as Comoros, Réunion, Madagascar, Seychelles, Isle de France (now Mauritius) and others. With the growth of Portuguese interests in Brazil and of plantation owners from other colonial empires in the Caribbean, North and South America, the demand for slaves grew dramatically. The Makua people were one of the major victims of this demand, slave capture and export that attempted to satisfy this demand.

In the 19th century, the Makua chiefs joined the lucrative trading by becoming a supplier of slaves and raiding ethnic groups near them, selling the captured people to the same merchants and exporters. The exports of Makua people has led to this ethnic group's presence in many islands of the Indian Ocean such as Madagascar, the Caribbean, the United States and elsewhere.

According to Palmer and Newitt, one of the strategies deployed by Africans and Arab slave raiders and traders was to dehumanize the Makua and Lomwe communities, by publicly stereotyping them as "barbarous and savage tribes", which made slave buyers between 1800 and 1880 feel justified and righteous in "exploiting, civilizing" them from their barbarous ways. In truth, state modern era scholars, the historical evidence and economic success of Makua people suggest that they were peaceful and industrious.

== Religion ==
In the traditional religion of the Makua people, the principal deity is named Muluku; he is opposed by an evil spirit named Minepa. According to legend, Muluku created the first man and the first woman from two holes in the ground, and gave them the art of using tools. The humans were disobedient, so Muluku summoned two monkeys and gave them the same tools and instruction. Seeing that the monkeys made good use of the tools, Muluku cut off their tails and fastened them to the man and the woman, telling the monkeys to be human and the humans to be monkeys.

The Makua people have predominantly held on to this traditional religion (66 to 70%), which reveres ancestors and nature spirits. The exception is the coastal population, where the Makua traders (under the influence of their Swahili-Arab customers) converted to the Shafi'i school of Sunni Islam. According to 19th-century records made by the Portuguese, there was at that time hardly any Islamic presence among the Makua people beyond the coastal settlements.

The Makua people refer to the coastal Muslim people as the Maka, which may be derived from Mecca, or from the words "salt" or "coast", both of which in the Makua language translate to Maka.

== Makua diaspora ==
The Makua people were widely distributed around the world during the colonial era. One of the oft studied ethnography of Makua people was published in 1847 by Eugene de Froberville, after he interviewed and learnt the Makua traditions and culture from over three hundred Makua people in Mauritius plantations.

Makua people once lived in the country of South Africa in an area near Durban called Bluff. However, due to the Apartheid era Group Areas Act, they were forcibly removed from Bluff and settled in Bayview, Chatsworth, Durban in 1960. Some Makua settled in Wentworth, Mariannhill, Mariannridge, Umlazi, Newlands East and West, Pietermaritzburg, Cape Town and Johannesburg.

The Makua language, a Bantu language, is still predominantly spoken among the people, alongside Afrikaans and Zulu (in South Africa), Portuguese in Mozambique, some Swahili by the elders of the community but still spoken by many on the Tanzania-Mozambican border, and English in South Africa and Tanzania.

== See also ==
- Makhuwa language
- Makua languages
- Makoa
