= Malawi Parliament Building =

Seat of the Parliament of Malawi

Coordinates: 13.9522°S 33.7878°E

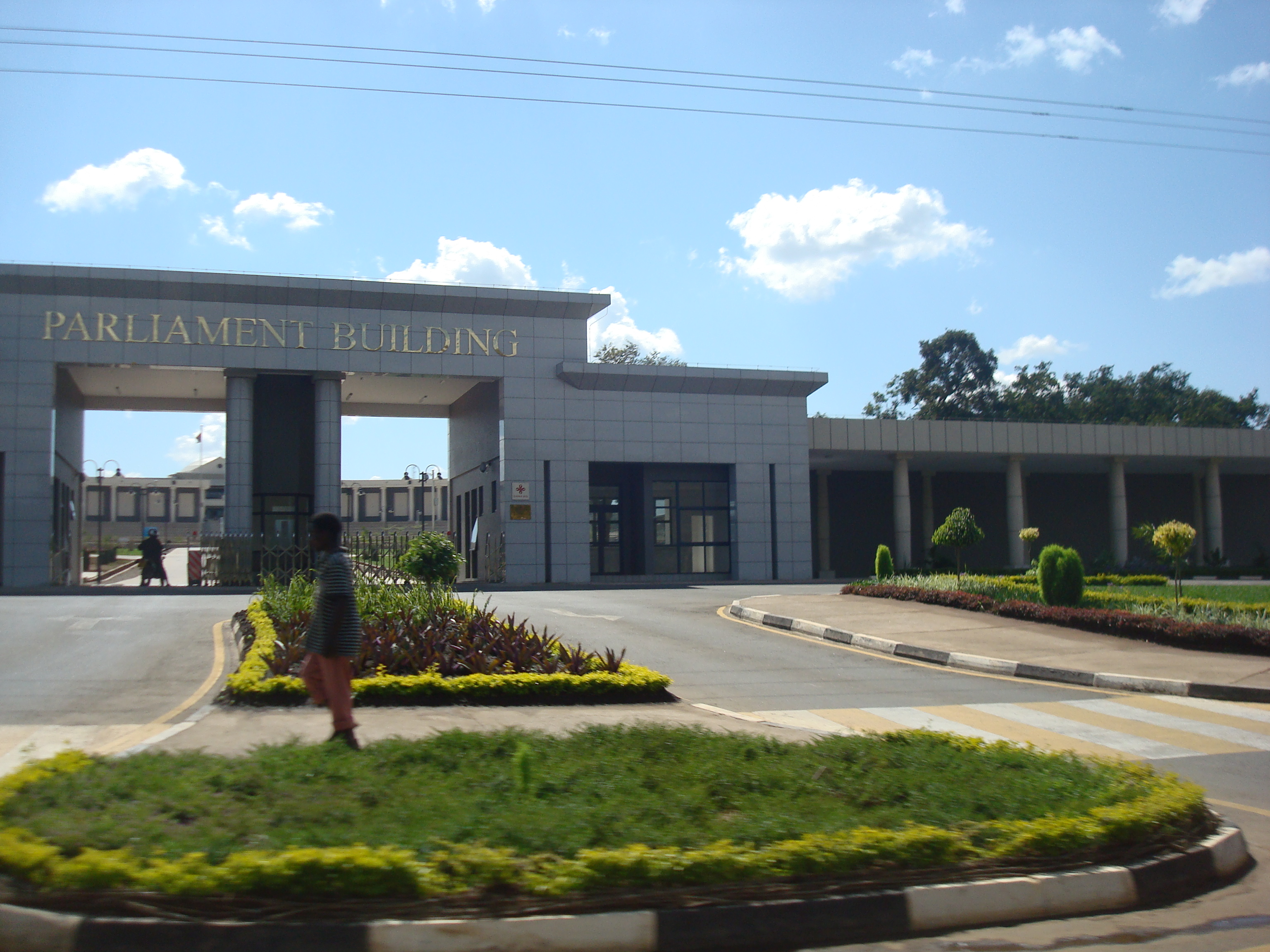
- Parliament Building in 2012
- Interactive map of the Malawi Parliament Building area

General information
- Location: Lilongwe City Centre, Malawi, Lilongwe, Malawi
- Construction started: 2000
- Completed: 2003
- Client: Government of Malawi
- Owner: Government of Malawi

Height
- Height: 32.4 m (106 ft)

The Malawi Parliament Building is a state building located in the city centre of Lilongwe and serves as the seat of the National Assembly of Malawi, the country's supreme legislative body. The building is also open to the public for guided tours and educational programs.

== Construction ==
The construction of the Malawi Parliament Building began in the early 2000s, during the presidency of Bakili Muluzi. The building was designed to replace the old parliament building, which was deemed too small and inadequate for the country's growing legislative needs.

The construction of the parliament building was funded by the Malawian government, with a total expenditure of approximately MWK 1.2 billion (approximately USD 1.7 million). China also provided funding for the construction of the building. On December 4, 2008, China and Malawi signed the exchange of notes and construction contract for the Malawi Parliament Building project.

Construction of the building officially began on February 16, 2009, and it was inaugurated on May 21, 2010, construction by Anhui Foreign Economic Construction (Group) Company Limited. The inauguration ceremony was attended by all members of the Malawian Cabinet, parliamentarians, the President of the World Parliamentary Union (WPI), and parliamentary leaders from other African countries such as Namibia, Zambia, Zimbabwe, and Mozambique. Li Zhaoxing, Chairman of the Foreign Affairs Committee of China's National People's Congress, was also present at the ceremony.

== Structure ==
The parliament building is a large, modern complex that spans over 10,000 square meters. It has a seating capacity of 193 members of parliament, as well as facilities for parliamentary committees, offices for members of parliament and staff, and a library. The building is also equipped with state-of-the-art technology, including a digital recording system and simultaneous interpretation facilities.

The Malawi Parliament Building is currently in use and serves as the seat of the National Assembly of Malawi. It has hosted numerous parliamentary sessions, committee meetings, and other events since its completion.

== Symbolism ==
The parliament building is a symbol of Malawi's democracy and a source of national pride. It has hosted numerous high-profile events, including the swearing-in of presidents and the launch of major development projects. The building is also a popular tourist attraction in Lilongwe, with its modern architecture and beautiful gardens.
