= Victor Musowa =

Malawian politician

Deputy Speaker of the National Assembly
- Incumbent
- Assumed office 29 October 2025
- President: Peter Mutharika
- Preceded by: Madalitso Kazombo

Member of Parliament for Mulanje Bale Constituency
- Incumbent
- Assumed office 2019
- President: Peter Mutharika; Lazarus Chakwera

Personal details
- Party: Democratic Progressive Party

Victor Musowa is a Malawian politician who has served as Deputy Speaker of the National Assembly of Malawi since 2025 and as a Member of Parliament representing the Mulanje Bale Constituency under the Democratic Progressive Party since 2019. He has been a member of key parliamentary committees such as Legal Affairs and International Relations.

== Political career ==
Musowa was first elected to Parliament in 2019 on the DPP ticket. Within his constituency, he has been active in supporting education initiatives, including providing assistance to needy students and rewarding primary schools for academic performance.

Musowa has spoken publicly on various national issues, including food insecurity. He urged the Lazarus Chakwera government to take stronger and faster measures to address hunger affecting rural populations.

In October 2025, he announced his candidacy for the position of Second Deputy Speaker of the National Assembly, pledging to promote cooperation and unity among members of Parliament. On 29 October 2025, he was elected First Deputy Speaker of the National Assembly of Malawi following a parliamentary vote.

The Malawi School of Government arranged for MPs to be trained to question government projects in 2026. Musowa assured members that they needed to attend. Moreover he said it was expected that they would demonstrating their learning and not just by displaying a certificate.

== Legal matters ==
In 2024, Musowa was briefly detained on allegations of proposing violence during a political rally. A state appeal to have him remanded for seven days was later dismissed by the court.
