= Thom Mpinganjira =

Malawian businessman

- Born: Lilongwe, Malawi
- Occupation: Businessman

Thom Mpinganjira is a Malawian businessperson and philanthropist. He is the founder and former CEO of FDH Financial Holdings Limited. He has also served as a council member of the Bankers Association of Malawi. He was a Trustee of the University of Malawi Alumni Association.

Previously, Mpinganjira was a chairman of Malawi Investments Promotion Agency. He was also a member of the Institute of Bankers in Malawi before becoming a chairman of the Stakeholders Committee of Millennium Challenge Account.

Mpinganjira was the chairman of the Electricity Supply Commission of Malawi (ESCOM). Mpinganjira is also a member of the Ethical and Investigations Committee for the Institute of Chartered Accountants.

== Controversy ==
In 2021, High Court Dorothy A DeGabriele convicted him for attempting to bribe five constitutional court judges, applying a custodial sentence of nine years.

== See also ==
- Abraham Simama
