= Dorothy A DeGabriele =

Judge of High Court in Malawi

Dorothy Alethea DeGabriele
- Born: Jolofani; 18 January 1973 (age 53)
- Education: PhD (Law) University of Warwick, LLM University of London (2010), LLB University of Malawi (1999)
- Occupations: Judge at the High Court of Malawi, Criminal Division
- Known for: SADC advisor on electoral justice research into criminal justice for children; report on HIV/AIDS in prisons; recent judgement in the case of Thom Mpinganjira
- Title: Lady Justice
- Awards: Commonwealth Scholarship Award

Coat of arms of Malawi

Dorothy A. DeGabriele is a Judge of the High Court of Malawi, in the Criminal Division.

== Personal life ==
Dorothy Alethea Jolofani (married name DeGabriele ) was born on 18 January 1973, and has children.

== Education ==
DeGabriele completed her doctorate at the University of Warwick, on governance and role of the courts in the election process, which was aided by a Commonwealth Scholarship Award. Her LLM was awarded by the University of London in 2010, after her LLB(Hons) from the University of Malawi (1999).

== Career ==
DeGabriele is advisor to the SADC Electoral Advisory Council. Her judiciary career began in 2000 and she has held chairperson roles in the Malawi Court of Industrial Relations, Prison Services Commission, and the National Juvenile Justice Forum, which led on innovative approaches to punishment for children in conflict with the law. DeGabriele has researched into HIV/AIDS in prisons as well as child justice, human rights and electoral justice. She was appointed to the High Court, Criminal Division on 14 October 2016.

DeGabriele was the judge, in the case of attempts at bribery of constitutional court judges by wealthy businessman,Thom Mpinganjira, who was sentenced to nine years in prison, saying “Under these circumstances, the offences committed were aggravated and this court will not impose a non-custodial sentence.”

She spoke at a conference in November 2024 on Judging and Constitutionalism in Contemporary Africa, at the University of Warwick and in February 2025 on African Judges Preventing and Reacting to Political Attacks at Queen Mary, University of London.
