= Lewis Mataka Bandawe =

Lewis Bandawe
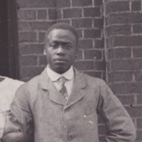
- in 1913
- Born: 1887; Mozambique
- Died: 1967 (aged 79–80)
- Occupations: missionary and civil servant
- Known for: translating the New Testament, first Malawian to be awarded an MBE
- Spouse: Grace Bandawe

Lewis Mataka Bandawe MBE (1887 – 1967) was a Malawian translator and husband of Grace Bandawe from 1913. He was a missionary and bible translator. He was the first Malawian to be awarded an MBE in 1956. The Grace Bandawe Conference Center in Blantyre is named for his wife.

== Life ==
Bandawe was born near Murumbu Hill in Mozambique in 1887 at Kongoni. He moved to Blantyre when he was thirteen in 1899.

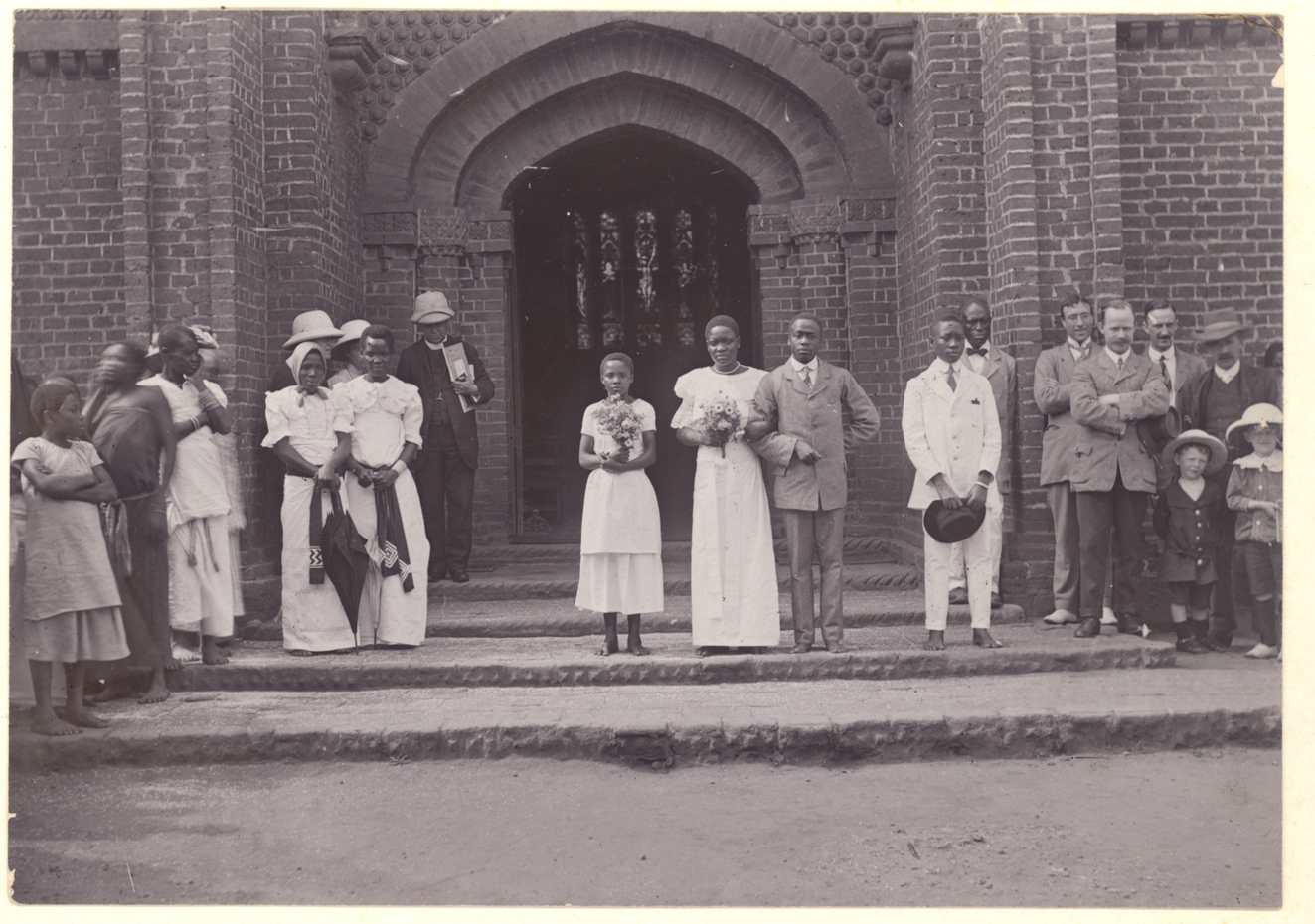
Wedding of Lewis and Grace Bandawe in 1913

He met Grace Lindsay Ayufari who had been educated at the mission by Janet Beck. In 1913 they married at St. Michaels and All Angels Church in Blantyre. The wedding was conducted by the leading Scottish missionary Alexander Hetherwick and photographed by the Malawian photographer Mungo Murray Chisuse. It was noted that the wedding party was multiracial. The two of them were to be key figures of the Blantyre mission until the 1960s.

Bandawe worked on a translation of the New Testament into the Lomwe language with E.D. Bowman. Bandawe led the Mihecani Mission until 1928 and during that time the four gospels and Acts was published in Lomwe.

In 1943 he founded and led the Lomwe Tribal Representative Association. The association was able to influelce the government into using the word "Alomwe" when referring to their tribes people and to avoiding the "Anguru" word which was considered pejorative. The (A)nguru word was associated with the idea that the person spoke an incomprehensible language. In 1947 the association was abandoned as its leading figures began to devote their time to the Nyasaland National Congress which did not emphasise tribal loyalties. There appears to have been little resistance to this and it implies that the association did not have popular support.

Bandawe became a Member of the British Empire in the 1956 New Year Honours list.

== Death and legacy ==
Bandawe died in 1967. In 1971 his autobiography "Memoirs of a Malawian: The Life and Reminiscences of Lewis Mataka Bandawe" was published. Professor Bridglal Pachai worked with him and he was credited as an editor. The Grace Bandawe Conference Centre in Blantyre is named after his wife.
