= Abraham Simama =

Malawian businessman and preacher

Abraham John Simama
- Born: Mbeya, Tanzania
- Citizenship: Malawian
- Education: University of Malawi
- Occupation: Businessman
- Known for: Environmental activism
- Title: Chairman of the Northern Region Football Association
- Term: 2014–present
- Awards: Africa Leadership Award (2015)

Abraham John Simama is a Malawian businessman, preacher, and philanthropist. He is the founder and CEO of Simama Industries, a conglomerate with interests in the construction, real estate, and agriculture. He is also the senior pastor and the founder of the Glorious Light International Church, which is headquartered in Lilongwe and has written several books on spirituality and leadership. He is the founder of Simama Hotel located in the capital Malawi.

== Background ==
=== Early life and education ===
Simama was born on October 12, 1975, in Mbeya, Tanzania, but was raised in Malawi after his family moved there when he was a child. He attended primary school in Lilongwe and later went to secondary school in Blantyre. He then earned a scholarship to study theology at the University of Malawi, graduating with a Bachelor of Arts degree in 1999. He later earned a Master's degree in business administration from the University of South Africa in 2005.

On 16th February 2025, bishop Abraham John Simama officiated the consecration and Ordination of Bishop Dr. Glory Khembo Joshua, Bishop Joseph Douglas Mambala, and Bishop Priest Rabbi Kabvina in an event organized by the Christian Associations Worldwide: Christian Association of Malawi

== Business ventures ==
=== Simama Hotel ===
Simama owns the Simama Hotel, an international standard hotel located in Lilongwe, Malawi's capital city. The hotel was officially opened by Minister of Information, Tourism and Civic Education, Jappie Mhango, on Thursday, September 10, 2015. The hotel cost MK3.6 Billion to build and has 52 rooms. It was built by the Simama Group of Companies. The hotel has modern amenities, including satellite television, conference rooms, a health club, gym, sauna, steam room and IPTV system. The hotel is the significant addition to Malawi's hospitality industry, offering comfortable and luxurious accommodation to business travelers and tourists alike.

=== Football clubs and organisations ===
Simama is the chairman of the Northern Region Football Association (NRFA) and owns the Simama Premier League, a football league. The NRFA is the governing body for football in the Northern Region of Malawi. The organisation is responsible for overseeing and developing the sport in the region as well as responsible for running football affairs in the Northern Region of Malawi. The current chairperson of the NRFA is Lameck Zetu Khonje. The organization works to promote and develop football in the region, and provides support to its member clubs. The NRFA also organizes football competitions and tournaments in the region.

== Accolades ==
Simama has received several awards for his business and philanthropic work, including the Malawian Businessman of the Year award in 2010 and the Africa Leadership Award in 2015.

== Accusations ==
Simama has been accused of being a Satanist and has faced rumors of occultism, but he has denied these allegations and stated that they are spread by people who do not understand him. He has been married to his current wife, Lizness, for over 25 years. He has also been accused of using his political connections to acquire a government building in Lilongwe for his church's use, but he has denied these allegations and stated that his church pays rent for the building. Simama has also been involved in various philanthropic efforts, including building schools and hospitals in rural Malawi.
