= World Bank Scholarships Program =

The World Bank Scholarship programme began in 1982. Students are able to undertake graduate studies in subjects related to economic development. There are two kinds of scholarship currently available on a very competitive basis:

1. The Joint Japan/World Bank Graduate Scholarship Program (JJ/WBGSP) is run with funding from the Japanese government and the World Bank; scholarships are awarded to individuals from World Bank member countries to study at renowned universities in other member countries.

There are three universities in the Kanto (Tokyo/Yokohama) area which offer a master's degree with an internship at the Japan National Tax Agency\College (NTA/NTA). These three universities and programs are: the Public Policy and Taxation (PPT) program at Yokohama National University (YNU- Economics), the Program in Taxation Policy and Management at Keio University, and the Tax Course in the Public Finance Program at GRIPS (Tokyo). The Programs at YNU and Keio are two-year programs while the one at GRIPS is one year long. The GRIPS and YNU programs start in the Fall, whereas Keio starts in April.

2. The Robert S. McNamara Fellowships Program provides support to young researchers working in academic and research institutions from eligible countries preparing a doctoral dissertation. Research grants cover residence costs for a 5- to 10-month period in a renowned university or research center .

== The Robert S McNamara Fellows ==
Notable alumni include:

- Nauro F. Campos - Professor of Economics at University College London and Research Professor at ETH-Zürich
- Thea Gomelauri - Director at Oxford Interfaith Forum and Member of Asian and Middle Eastern Studies at the University of Oxford at the TORCH
