= Moniga language =

Bantu language of Mozambique

Moniga
- Makhuwa-Moniga
- Native to: Mozambique
- Native speakers: 200,000 (2003)
- Language family: Niger–Congo?: Atlantic–Congo; Volta-Congo; Benue–Congo; Bantoid; Southern Bantoid; Bantu; Southern Bantu; Makua languages; Moniga

Language codes
- ISO 639-3: mhm
- Glottolog: makh1265
- Guthrie code: P.341

Moniga, also known as Makhuwa-Moniga, is a Bantu language spoken in Mozambique. The language is also known as Emoniga among its speakers. It is classified within the Makua languages and has the ISO 639-3 code mhm. Moniga is classified as P.341 in Guthrie's classification of Bantu languages. Emoniga is documented in Pebane District in Zambézia Province, including Pebane city, Bogodade, Mulapane and Mulai.
