= Sunbird Hotels and Resorts =

Hotel company in Malawi

Sunbird Hotel
- Interactive map of the Sunbird Hotel area
- Alternative names: Location of Hotel Sunbird headquarters, Lilongwe
- Etymology: The neighborhood of Malawian cities

General information
- Type: Hotel
- Location: Lilongwe, Malawi
- Coordinates: 13°55′S 33°47′E
- Construction started: 1987
- Opened: 1988

Height
- Height: 120 ft (37 m)

Technical details
- Floor count: 10
- Grounds: 12,581 ft^{2} (1,168.8 m^{2})

Other information
- Number of rooms: Varies but up to 80

Website
- https://www.sunbirdmalawi.com/

Sunbird Hotels and Resorts or simply Sunbird Hotels, is a Malawian chain of hotels located across the country's cities and towns. It is the country's biggest chain of hotels. The company was incorporated around 1988 as a private institution.

The hotel offers facilities and services for local and middle-class businesses, as well as leisure travellers. In 2021, the company made it compulsory for its workers to get vaccinated against COVID-19.

In December 2019, the Malawian government was the largest shareholder with 71% of the shares, Press Corporation owned about 15%, and the members of the public share 14%. The Chief Executive of the company is Yusuf Olela.

== Locations ==
The hotels are located in almost every district in Malawi but are more advanced in regional capital cities such as Lilongwe, Mzuzu and Blantyre.
