= Makhuwa language =

Bantu language spoken in Mozambique

Makhuwa
- Emakuana
- Native to: Mozambique, Tanzania
- Ethnicity: Makua
- Native speakers: 8.6 million (2017)
- Language family: Niger–Congo?: Atlantic–Congo; Volta-Congo; Benue–Congo; Bantoid; Southern Bantoid; Bantu; Makua languages; Makhuwa
- Writing system: Latin

Official status
- Official language in: Mozambique

Language codes
- ISO 639-3: Variously: vmw – Central Makhuwa mgh – Makhuwa-Meetto vmk – Makhuwa-Shirima kzn – Kokola llb – Lolo mny – Manyawa vmr – Marenje tke – Takwane xmc – Makhuwa-Marrevone xsq – Makhuwa-Saka
- Glottolog: maku1279 Makua–Lomwe; adds Lomwe & Moniga chuw1239 Chuwaboic; adds Chuwabo koko1267 Kokola many1259 Manyawa
- Guthrie code: P.31

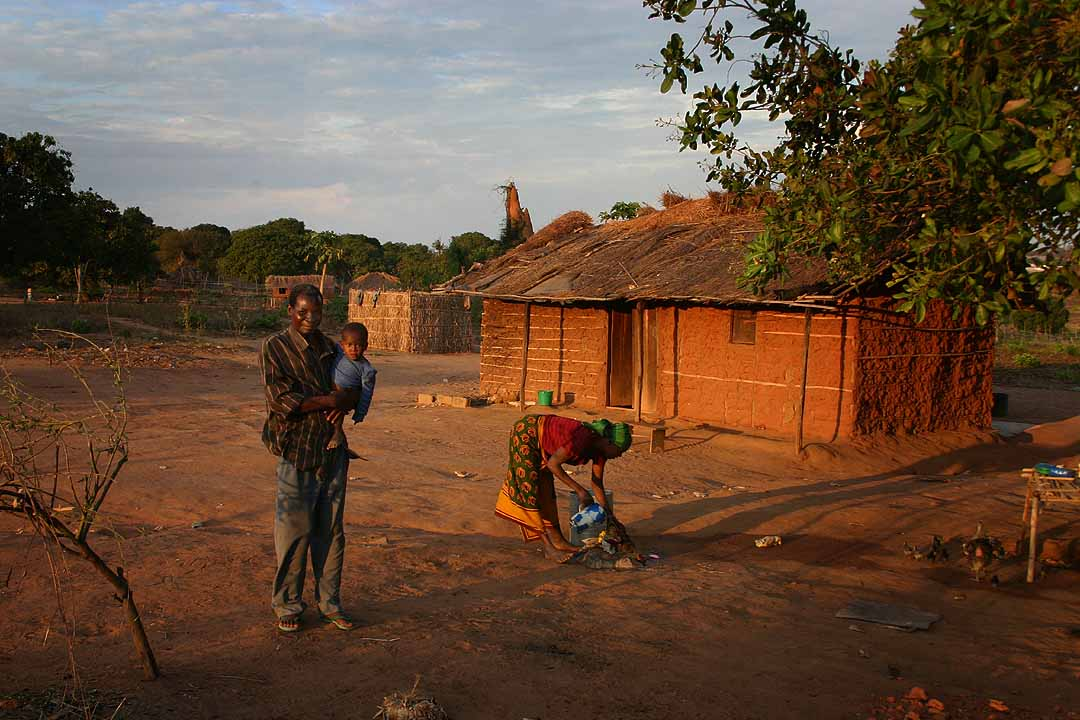
A Makhuwa family in Nampula.

Makhuwa (Emakhuwa; also spelled Makua and Macua) or Mozambican is the primary Bantu language of northern Mozambique. It is spoken by roughly 5.8 million Makua people, who live north of the Zambezi River, particularly in Nampula Province, which is virtually entirely ethnically Makua. It is the most widely spoken indigenous language of Mozambique.

== Classification ==
Apart from the languages in the same group, eMakhuwa is distinguished from other Bantu languages by the loss of consonant + vowel prefixes in favour of e; compare epula, "rain", with Tswana pula.

Long and short vowels distinguish five vowel qualities /i e a o u/:

- omala - to finish
- omaala - to paste, stick
- omela - to sprout, bud
- omeela - to share out

The consonants are more complex: postalveolar tt and tth exist, both p and ph are used. Both x (English "sh") and h exist while x varies with s. Regionally, there are also θ (the "th" of English "thorn"), ð (the "th" of English "seethe"), z and ng. For instance in eLomwe, to which Makhuwa is closely related, the tt of eMakhuwa is represented by a "ch" as in English "church".

== Phonology ==
=== Consonants ===
		Labial	Dental	Alveolar	Retroflex	Palatal	Velar	Glottal
Plosive	voiceless	p	t		ʈ	c	k	
Plosive	aspirated	pʰ	tʰ		ʈʰ		kʰ	
Fricative	voiceless	f		s		ʃ		h
Fricative	voiced	v	(θ)~ð	z				
Nasal		m		n		ɲ	ŋ	
Lateral				l		ʎ		
Trill				r				
Approximant		w				j		

=== Vowels ===
	Front	Central	Back
Close	i iː		u uː
Mid	e eː		o oː
Open		a aː	

=== Tone ===
In Makhuwa, tone is distinctive. In the eNahara dialect, there are two tones, low (L) and high (H), and the tone-bearing unit in Makhuwa phonology is the mora. Low tone is unmarked in writing, while high tone is indicated by an acute accent above vowels or nasals (á, ń) or next to tone-bearing consonants (´l).

== Dialects ==
The names of the dialects vary in different sources. The shibboleth or distinctive variant in the dialects is the treatment of the s:

- eSamgagi dialect: odhiva
- eSangagi dialect: θtiva
- eSaaka dialect: ociva
- eNahara dialect: oziva - all meaning "agreeable, pleasant"

Maho (2009) lists the following dialects:

- Central Makhuwa (3.1 million)
- Meetto (Metto) (1.3 million, including Ruvuma)
- Chirima (Shirima) (1.5 million, including subdialects Kokola, Lolo, Manyawa, Marenje, Takwane)
- Marrevone (Coastal Makhuwa; 460,000 including eNahara)
- eNahara (Naharra)
- eSaka (Saka, 210,000)
- Ruvuma Makhuwa (Tanzanian Makhuwa, including subdialects Imithupi, Ikorovere)

Mutual intelligibility between these is limited. Central Makhuwa ("Makhuwa-Makhuwana") is the basis of the standard language. Ethnologue lists Central Makhuwa, Meetto–Ruvuma, Marrevone–Enahara, and Esaka as separate languages, and Chirima as six languages.

The population figures are from Ethnologue for 2006. They tally 3.1 million speakers of Central Makhuwa and 3.5 million of the other varieties, though the Ethnologue article for Central Makhuwa covers Marrevone and Enahara, so these might be double counted.

== Vocabulary ==
The following is a sample vocabulary in the Central Makhuwa dialect:

Makhuwa	English	Notes
apakati	avocado	borrowed from Portuguese abacate
ovenya	to wake up	
alyu	garlic	borrowed from Portuguese alho
mwana	child	Cognate with Swahili mwana
ophenta	to love	Cognate with Swahili kupenda
ekamaama	light	

== Reading material in eMakhuwa ==
Muluku Onnalavuliha Àn'awe - Ipantte sikosolasiwe sa Biblia ("God speaks to his children" - extracts from the Scriptures for children) Aid to the Church in Need. Edição em Macúa / eMakhuwa) Editorial Verbo Divino, Estella, Navarra, 1997.

== Sample text ==
6 Moovirikana ni mamwene ale ootakhala, aakhala atthu akina yaawenrye woona ntata na Muluku, nnaamwi awo okathi mukina yaarina makhalelo mamosaru yaarina aya atthu ale akina aromoliwe.

Translation

6 In contrast with those wicked kings, others saw God's hand, even though they were in the same situation as those mentioned above.
