= Makua languages =

Makua
- Makhuwa
- Geographic distribution: Mozambique
- Linguistic classification: Niger–Congo?: Atlantic–Congo; Volta-Congo; Benue–Congo; Bantoid; Southern Bantoid; Bantu; Makua
- Subdivisions: Makhuwa; Koti, Sakati; Lomwe; Cuabo–Maindo; Moniga

Language codes
- Glottolog: maku1247

The Makua or Makhuwa languages are a branch of Bantu languages spoken primarily in Mozambique.

== Name ==
The name Makua (Macua), more precisely Makhuwa, is used on three levels. Some sources distinguish these with differences in spelling 'Makua' vs. 'Makhuwa', but they are not consistent.

1. Central Makhuwa, or "Makhuwa-Makhuwana", the prestige dialect
2. The Makhuwa language, including various dialects which also go by the name Makhuwa; sometimes called 'core' or 'nuclear' Makua, but this is not consistent
3. Closely related languages which often have their own names, such as Lomwe (also known as Western Makua)

== Classification ==
Makhuwa is assigned to Zone P of the Guthrie classification of Bantu languages. With the classification of the other Zone-P languages as Rufiji–Ruvuma, Makhuwa becomes essentially synonymous with Zone P. However, the zones are geographic rather than genealogical clades. The closest relatives of the Makhuwa branch are not clear, but some classifications place them with the Nyasa and Southern Bantu languages.

- Makhuwa (Core Makhuwa, including dialects Makhuwa-Meetto, Makhuwa-Shirima, Makhuwa-Marrevone, etc.)
- Koti
- Sakati
- Lomwe (including Ngulu dialect)
- Chuwabu
- Moniga

The core languages, and beyond, have minimal mutual intelligibility.
