= Lomwe people =

Ethnic group in Malawi and Mozambique

The Lomwe people are Bantu tribes found in Mozambique and Malawi. Their language is commonly spoken throughout central Mozambique. In Malawi, people speak the Malawi Lomwe language. Late former president Bingu wa Mutharika and his brother, Peter Mutharika (another president of the Republic of Malawi), belong to this ethnic group.
