= Mang'anja =

Bantu ethnic group of Southern and Central Africa

The Mang'anja are a Bantu people of Southern Malawi, particularly around Chikwawa in the Shire River valley of southern Malawi. They speak a dialect of the Nyanja language, and are a branch of the Amaravi people. They practice the Mbona cult.

== Notable Mang'anja people ==
- Edward Bwanali
- Gwanda Chakuamba
