= Lomwe language =

Language

Lomwe
- Western Makhuwa
- Elomwe
- Native to: Malawi, Mozambique
- Ethnicity: Lomwe
- Native speakers: 2,520,000 (2017)
- Language family: Niger–Congo?: Atlantic–Congo; Volta-Congo; Benue–Congo; Bantoid; Southern Bantoid; Bantu; Makua; Lomwe
- Dialects: Lomwe; Ngulu (Mihavane)

Official status
- Recognised minority language in: Malawi

Language codes
- ISO 639-3: ngl
- Glottolog: lomw1241
- Guthrie code: P.32–33

The Lomwe (Lowe) language, Elomwe, also known as Western Makua, is a Bantu language of Mozambique. It belongs with Makua in the group of distinctive Bantu languages in the northern part of the country.

== Discussion ==
Apart from the regional variations found within the Makhuwa proper, the Lomwe uses ch where tt appears in the Makhuwa orthography: for instance the Makhuwa mirette ("remedy") corresponds to the Lomwe mirecce, the Makhuwa murrutthu ("dead body") to the Lomwe miruchu, the Makhuwa otthapa ("joy") to the Lomwe ochapa.

Unusual among Bantu languages is the infinitive of the verb with o- instead of the typically Bantu ku- prefix: omala (eMakhuwa) is "to finish", omeeela (also an eMakhuwa form) is "to share out".

A mutually unintelligible form containing elements of Malawian Lomwe, is spoken in Malawi. Maho (2009) separates out Ngulu (Mihavane) as a separate language, close to Malawi Lomwe.

== The bible ==
Lewis Mataka Bandawe worked on a translation of the New Testament into the Lomwe language with E.D. Bowman. Bandawe led the Mihecani Mission until 1928 and during that time the four gospels and Acts were published in Lomwe.

== Phonology ==
=== Consonants ===
		Labial	Alveolar	Palatal	Velar		Glottal
		Labial	Alveolar	Palatal	plain	lab.	Glottal
Plosive/ Affricate	voiceless	p	t	tʃ	k	kʷ	
Plosive/ Affricate	aspirated	pʰ	tʰ	tʃʰ	kʰ	kʷʰ	
Fricative	voiceless	f	s	ʃ			h
Fricative	voiced	v	z				
Nasal		m	n	ɲ	ŋ		
Trill			r				
Lateral			l	ʎ			
Approximant				j		w	

=== Vowels ===
	Front	Central	Back
Close	i iː		u uː
Mid	e eː		o oː
Open		a aː	
