= Kossandji =

- Village
- Location in Ivory Coast
- Coordinates: 5°50′N 3°37′W
- Country: Ivory Coast
- District: Lagunes
- Region: La Mé
- Department: Alépé
- Sub-prefecture: Danguira
- Time zone: UTC+0 (GMT)

Kossandji is a village in south-eastern Ivory Coast. It is in the sub-prefecture of Danguira, Alépé Department, La Mé Region, Lagunes District.

Kossandji was a commune until March 2012, when it became one of 1,126 communes nationwide that were abolished. The Mabi/Yaya Classified Forest is to the west, north, and east of the village.
