= Lagunes Region =

Coordinates: 5°25′N 4°20′W

Lagunes Region Région des Lagunes
- Defunct region of Ivory Coast
- 1997–2011
- Location of Lagunes Region in Ivory Coast
- Capital: Abidjan
- Area
- 13,323 km^{2} (5,144 sq mi)
- History
  - Established as a first-level subdivision: 1997
  - Disestablished: 2011
- Today part of: Abidjan Autonomous District (all); Grands-Ponts Region (all); Agnéby-Tiassa and La Mé Regions (parts)

Lagunes Region is a defunct region of Ivory Coast. From 1997 to 2011, it was a first-level subdivision region. The region's capital was Abidjan and its area was 13,323 km². Since 2011, the area formerly encompassed by the region is Abidjan Autonomous District and part of Lagunes District.

== Administrative divisions and geography ==
At the time of its dissolution, Lagunes Region was divided into seven departments: Abidjan, Alépé, Dabou, Grand-Lahou, Jacqueville, Sikensi, and Tiassalé.

Lagunes Region was traversed by a northwesterly line of equal latitude and longitude.

== Abolition ==
Lagunes Region was abolished as part of the 2011 administrative reorganisation of the subdivisions of Ivory Coast. The territory of the region was divided between the new Lagunes District and Abidjan Autonomous District. The territory of the departments of Sikensi and Tiassalé were combined with the former Agnéby Region's Agboville Department to form the second-level Agnéby-Tiassa Region in Lagunes District. The territory of Alépé Department was combined with Agnéby Region's Adzopé, Akoupé and Yakassé-Attobrou Departments to create La Mé Region in Lagunes District. The territory of the remaining departments of Lagunes Region—Dabou, Grand-Lahou, and Jacqueville—became Grands-Ponts Region in Lagunes District. The territory of Abidjan Department became the Abidjan Autonomous District.
