= Grand-Akoudzin =

- Village
- Location in Ivory Coast
- Coordinates: 6°1′N 3°59′W
- Country: Ivory Coast
- District: Lagunes
- Region: La Mé
- Department: Adzopé
- Sub-prefecture: Agou
- Time zone: UTC+0 (GMT)

Grand-Akoudzin is a village in south-eastern Ivory Coast. It is in the sub-prefecture of Agou, Adzopé Department, La Mé Region, Lagunes District.

Grand-Akoudzin was a commune until March 2012, when it became one of 1,126 communes nationwide that were abolished.
