= Bonahouin =

Bonahouin Benaouin
- Village
- Location in Ivory Coast
- Coordinates: 6°34′N 3°46′W
- Country: Ivory Coast
- District: Lagunes
- Region: La Mé
- Department: Akoupé
- Sub-prefecture: Bécouéfin
- Time zone: UTC+0 (GMT)

Bonahouin (also known as Benaouin) is a village in south-eastern Ivory Coast. It is in the sub-prefecture of Bécouéfin, Akoupé Department, La Mé Region, Lagunes District. Six kilometres north of the village is the tripoint of Lagunes, Lacs, and Comoé Districts.

Bonahouin was a commune until March 2012, when it became one of 1,126 communes nationwide that were abolished.
