= Ahouabo =

- Village
- Location in Ivory Coast
- Coordinates: 6°14′N 3°48′W
- Country: Ivory Coast
- District: Lagunes
- Region: La Mé
- Department: Adzopé
- Sub-prefecture: Adzopé
- Time zone: UTC+0 (GMT)

Ahouabo is a village in south-eastern Ivory Coast. It is in the sub-prefecture of Adzopé, Adzopé Department, La Mé Region, Lagunes District.

Until 2012, Ahouabo was in the commune of Ahouabo-Bouapé. In March 2012, Ahouabo-Bouapé became one of 1,126 communes nationwide that were abolished. Bouapé is a village just north of Ahouabo.
