= Diangobo, Lagunes =

Diangobo
- Village
- Location in Ivory Coast
- Coordinates: 6°9′N 3°39′W
- Country: Ivory Coast
- District: Lagunes
- Region: La Mé
- Department: Yakassé-Attobrou
- Sub-prefecture: Yakassé-Attobrou
- Time zone: UTC+0 (GMT)

Diangobo is a village in south-eastern Ivory Coast. It is in the sub-prefecture of Yakassé-Attobrou, Yakassé-Attobrou Department, La Mé Region, Lagunes District.

Diangobo was a commune until March 2012, when it became one of 1,126 communes nationwide that were abolished.
