= Diasson =

- Village
- Location in Ivory Coast
- Coordinates: 5°58′N 3°44′W
- Country: Ivory Coast
- District: Lagunes
- Region: La Mé
- Department: Adzopé
- Sub-prefecture: Annépé
- Time zone: UTC+0 (GMT)

Diasson is a village in south-eastern Ivory Coast. It is in the sub-prefecture of Annépé, Adzopé Department, La Mé Region, Lagunes District.

Diasson was a commune until March 2012, when it became one of 1,126 communes nationwide that were abolished.
