= Bacon (disambiguation) =

Bacon is a cured meat prepared from a pig.

Bacon may also refer to:

== People ==
- Bacon (name), a comprehensive list of people with family name "Bacon"

== Schools ==
- Bacon Academy, Connecticut
- Bacon College (1837–1851), a forerunner of Transylvania University, a private university in Lexington, Kentucky
- Bacon's College, London, a secondary school and sixth-form college previously known as Bacon Free School

== Places ==
=== United States ===
- Bacon Hills, a mountain range in California
- Bacon Island, California
- Bacons, Delaware, an unincorporated community
- Bacon County, Georgia, a county in Georgia
- Bacon, Indiana, an unincorporated community
- Bacon, Missouri, an unincorporated community
- Bacon Township, Vernon County, Missouri
- Bacon, Ohio, an unincorporated community
- Bacon Creek, near Mammoth Cave in Kentucky
- Bacon Creek, Washington
- Bacon Glacier, Alaska
- Bacon Peak, a mountain in Washington

=== Elsewhere ===
- Bacon, Ivory Coast, a village in Lagunes District, Ivory Coast
- Bacon Lake, British Columbia, Canada
- Bacon River, Nunavut, Canada

== Music and books ==
- "Bacon" (song), by Nick Jonas
- Bacon (album), a 2014 album by Igor & the Red Elvises
- Bacon: A Love Story, a 2009 non-fiction book by Heather Lauer

== Other uses ==
- Bacon baronets, three titles in the Baronetage of England, one extinct
- 2940 Bacon, an asteroid
- Bacon's, a chain of department stores
- Bacon's cipher, a method of steganographic message encoding devised by Francis Bacon
- Bacon Hotel, Whitehall, Arkansas, on the National Register of Historic Places
- OnePlus One, an Android smartphone released in 2014 (codename "bacon")
- Bacon (god), a Gaulish Celtic god
- Bacon's Rebellion, a rebellion in British North America
- Macon Bacon, a collegiate summer baseball team

== See also ==
- Bacn, e-mail that has been subscribed to but which the recipient may not want to read for a long period of time
- Battlefield Airborne Communications Node (BACN)
- Beacon (disambiguation)
- Thebacon
