= Agnéby =

Coordinates: 6°0′N 4°0′W

Agnéby Region Région de l'Agnéby
- Defunct region of Ivory Coast
- 1997–2011
- Location of Agbéby Region in Ivory Coast
- Capital: Agboville
- Area
- 9,234 km^{2} (3,565 sq mi)
- History
  - Established as a first-level subdivision: 1997
  - Disestablished: 2011
- Today part of: Agnéby-Tiassa (part) and La Mé (part) regions

Agnéby Region is a defunct region of Ivory Coast. From 1997 to 2011, it was a first-level subdivision region. The region's capital was Agboville and its area was 9,234 km^{2}. Since 2011, the area formerly encompassed by the region is part of Lagunes District.

== Administrative divisions ==
At the time of its dissolution, Agnéby Region was divided into four departments: Adzopé, Agboville, Akoupé, and Yakassé-Attobrou.

== Abolition ==
Agnéby Region was abolished as part of the 2011 administrative reorganisation of the subdivisions of Ivory Coast. The area formerly encompassed by the region is part of two regions of Lagunes District. The territory of the department of Agboville was combined with the former Lagunes Region's departments of Sikensi and Tiassalé to form Agnéby-Tiassa Region. The territory of the remaining departments, Adzopé, Akoupé, and Yakassé-Attobrou, was combined with the former Lagunes Region's department of Alépé to form La Mé Region.
