= Ellibou-Badasso =

- Village
- Location in Ivory Coast
- Coordinates: 5°41′N 4°31′W
- Country: Ivory Coast
- District: Lagunes
- Region: Agnéby-Tiassa
- Department: Sikensi
- Sub-prefecture: Sikensi
- Time zone: UTC+0 (GMT)

Ellibou-Badasso is a village in southern Ivory Coast. It is in the sub-prefecture of Sikensi, Sikensi Department, Agnéby-Tiassa Region, Lagunes District.

Ellibou-Badasso was a commune until March 2012, when it became one of 1,126 communes nationwide that were abolished. The village is now sometimes described as two separate but adjacent villages, Ellibou and Badasso.
