= Katadji =

- Town, sub-prefecture, and commune
- Location in Ivory Coast
- Coordinates: 5°40′N 4°32′W
- Country: Ivory Coast
- District: Lagunes
- Region: Agnéby-Tiassa
- Department: Sikensi

Population (2014 census)
  - Total: 3,686
- Time zone: UTC+0 (GMT)

Katadji is a rural locality located in Sikensi Department, in the southeastern region of the Ivory Coast.

As of the 2014 census, its population was of 3686 inhabitants. As of 2022, the village chief is Abo Faustin.

== Infrastructure ==
=== Education ===
The Modern College of Katadji was established in September 2020 and was established with the support of a Taiwanese foundation (TX) and the Baobab NGO.

=== Health ===
A health center exists, financed by the Assemblies of God. A maternity was established in 2015, however it was still pending the arrival of its equipment at the time.

== Notable people ==
- Kacou Philippe, notable false prophet (1972)
