= Allosso =

Allosso Allosso 2
- Town and sub-prefecture
- Location in Ivory Coast
- Coordinates: 5°37′N 3°36′W
- Country: Ivory Coast
- District: Lagunes
- Region: La Mé
- Department: Alépé

Population (2014)
  - Total: 12,703
- Time zone: UTC+0 (GMT)

Allosso is a town in south-eastern Ivory Coast. It is a sub-prefecture of Alépé Department in La Mé Region, Lagunes District.

The town—but not the sub-prefecture—is sometimes referred to as Allosso 2.

Allosso was a commune until March 2012, when it became one of 1,126 communes nationwide that were abolished.
