= Adama Diakité (footballer, born 1993) =

Ivorian footballer

Personal information
- Date of birth: 8 October 1993 (age 33)
- Place of birth: Memni, Ivory Coast
- Height: 1.88 m (6 ft 2 in)
- Position: Forward

Team information
- Current team: Teramo
- Number: 9

Youth career
- Padova

Senior career*
Years	Team	Apps	(Gls)
2012–2014	Padova	8	(1)
2012–2013	→ AlbinoLeffe (loan)	21	(1)
2014–2016	Casertana	35	(6)
2016	→ Martina Franca (loan)	12	(2)
2016–2017	Modena	27	(2)
2017–2018	Taranto	28	(8)
2018–2020	Savoia	29	(14)
2020–2021	Nocerina	27	(9)
2021–2026	Torres	143	(41)
2026–	Teramo	0	(0)
- * Club domestic league appearances and goals as of 30 April 2026

Adama Diakité (born 8 October 1993) is an Ivorian footballer who plays for Serie D club Teramo

== Biography ==
Born in Memni, Alépé Department, Ivory Coast, Diakité moved to Italy at a young age. Diakité was a player for Madonna Alta Perugia in 2007. He was a player for the reserve team of Calcio Padova from 2009 to 2012. He made his Serie B debut in the last round of 2011–12 Serie B.

On 20 August 2012, he was signed by Lega Pro Prima Divisione (ex–Serie C1) club AlbinoLeffe in temporary deal, with Matteo Piccinni moved to opposite direction. Padova did not sign Piccinni outright; AlbinoLeffe also did not excise the option on Diakité.

Diakité returned to Padua in July 2013. He played 7 Serie B games for the second division struggler, in which the team was relegated to Lega Pro at the end of season.

On 6 August 2014, he was signed by Casertana.

On 17 December 2018, he was signed by Savoia. In August 2020, Diakité signed for Serie D side A.S.G. Nocerina, on a one-year contract.

== Personal life ==
Adama's family lives in Belgium; his father lives in Perugia. Adama's grandfather died in 2014.
