= Biéby =

- Town and sub-prefecture
- Location in Ivory Coast
- Coordinates: 6°5′N 3°38′W
- Country: Ivory Coast
- District: Lagunes
- Region: La Mé
- Department: Yakassé-Attobrou

Area
  - Total: 640 km^{2} (250 sq mi)

Population (2021 census)
  - Total: 24,178
  - Density: 38/km^{2} (98/sq mi)
  - Town: 16,646
- (2014 census)
- Time zone: UTC+0 (GMT)

Biéby is a town in south-eastern Ivory Coast. It is a sub-prefecture of Yakassé-Attobrou Department in La Mé Region, Lagunes District.

Biéby was a commune until March 2012, when it became one of 1,126 communes nationwide that were abolished.
