= Bécédi-Brignan =

Bécédi-Brignan Bécédi-Mbrignan
- Town and sub-prefecture
- Location in Ivory Coast
- Coordinates: 5°54′N 4°1′W
- Country: Ivory Coast
- District: Lagunes
- Region: La Mé
- Department: Adzopé

Area
  - Total: 149 km^{2} (58 sq mi)

Population (2021 census)
  - Total: 22,614
  - Density: 152/km^{2} (393/sq mi)
  - Town: 15,648
- (2014 census)
- Time zone: UTC+0 (GMT)

Bécédi-Brignan (also spelled Bécédi-Mbrignan) is a town in south-eastern Ivory Coast. It is a sub-prefecture of Adzopé Department in La Mé Region, Lagunes District.

Bécédi-Brignan was a commune until March 2012, when it became one of 1,126 communes nationwide that were abolished.
