= Bakanou =

- Village
- Location in Ivory Coast
- Coordinates: 5°35′N 4°38′W
- Country: Ivory Coast
- District: Lagunes
- Region: Agnéby-Tiassa
- Department: Sikensi
- Sub-prefecture: Sikensi
- Time zone: UTC+0 (GMT)

Bakanou is a village in southern Ivory Coast. It is in the sub-prefecture of Sikensi, Sikensi Department, Agnéby-Tiassa Region, Lagunes District. Bakanou is often described as two separate but adjacent villages, Bakanou A and Bakanou B.

Bakanou was a commune until March 2012, when it became one of 1,126 communes nationwide that were abolished.
