= Mabi/Yaya Classified Forest =

Protected area in Ivory Coast

Coordinates: 5°51′N 3°30′W

- IUCN category IV (habitat/species management area)
- Interactive map of Mabi/Yaya Classified Forest
- Location: Ivory Coast
- Area: 29,400 ha (114 sq mi)

The Mabi/Yaya Classified Forest is found in Ivory Coast, and it covers 294 km^{2} (114 sq mi). The village Kossandji is partially surrounded by the forest, and the town of Annépé is close to its western edge. It is classified as IUCN category IV.

== Environment ==
The reserve has been designated an Important Bird Area (IBA) by BirdLife International because it supports significant populations of many bird species, including the white-breasted guineafowl. It is one of the last habitats of the forest toad Sclerophrys togoensis.
