= Emmanuel Koné =

Ivorian footballer

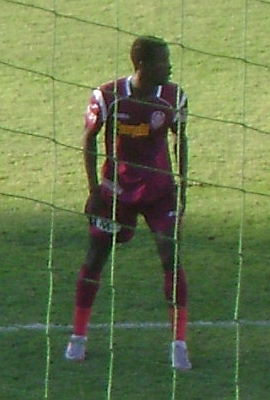
- Koné with CFR Cluj in 2010

Personal information
- Full name: Kouamatien Emmanuel Koné
- Date of birth: 31 December 1986 (age 39)
- Place of birth: Abongoua, Ivory Coast
- Height: 1.77 m (5 ft 10 in)
- Position: Midfielder

Youth career
- 2000–2004: ASEC Mimosas

Senior career*
Years	Team	Apps	(Gls)
2003–2007	ASEC Mimosas	35	(10)
2007–2011	CFR Cluj	30	(6)
2009–2010	→ Internațional Curtea de Argeș (loan)	30	(4)
2012–2013	Sedan	44	(5)
2013–2015	Levadiakos	43	(11)
2015–2019	Apollon Smyrnis	99	(9)
2019–2022	Levadiakos	48	(1)
Total		329	(51)

International career
2008	Ivory Coast U23	3	(0)
2008–2010	Ivory Coast	15	(0)
- * Club domestic league appearances and goals as of 06:19, 31 July 2022 (UTC)

Kouamatien Emmanuel Koné (born 31 December 1986) is an Ivorian professional footballer who played as a midfielder.

== Club career ==
=== ASEC Mimosas ===
Koné was born on 31 December 1986 in Abongoua, Ivory Coast and began playing junior-level football in 2000 at ASEC Mimosas. He started to play for the club's senior squad in the 2004 season, scoring three goals in seven league appearances, as the team won the title. In the following season, he played 12 league matches with three goals, helping the club win The Double. Subsequently, in the 2006 season, he won a third consecutive championship with ASEC, contributing with four goals in 16 matches.

=== CFR Cluj and Internațional Curtea de Argeș ===
In January 2008, Koné, along with compatriots Lacina Traoré, Ousmane Viera and Lamine Camara, moved to Romania to join CFR Cluj. The club paid a €500,000 fee to ASEC Mimosas for Koné's transfer. In July 2008, he impressed during the team's training camp in Austria and coach Ioan Andone called him "the new Semedo". Koné made his Liga I debut on 29 August, when Andone sent him in the 83rd minute to replace Emmanuel Culio in a 0–0 draw against Politehnica Iași. He scored his first league goal on 16 November in a 2–0 win over Argeș Pitești. He made four appearances in the 2008–09 Champions League group stage, playing in losses to Bordeaux, AS Roma and Chelsea. At the end of the season, the team won the Cupa României, but coach Toni Conceição did not use Koné in the 3–0 win over Politehnica Timișoara in the final.

For the 2009–10 season, Koné and Viera were sent on loan by CFR to Internațional Curtea de Argeș. Afterwards, Koné returned to CFR and made four appearances in the 2010–11 Champions League group stage, including a victory over Basel and a draw against AS Roma. On 14 April 2011, he scored a goal in a 1–1 derby draw against Universitatea Cluj. After making a single league appearance under coach Jorge Costa in a 2–0 loss to Pandurii Târgu Jiu in the first half of the 2011–12 season, Koné left CFR in November 2011, but the team managed to win the title without him. He accumulated a total of 60 matches and 10 goals in the Romanian top league.

=== Sedan ===
Koné joined Sedan, making his Ligue 2 debut on 27 January 2012 under coach Laurent Guyot in a 2–0 away victory against Metz. He scored his first goal in the competition on 23 March in a 3–0 away win over Amiens. On 18 December, he netted a brace in a 3–1 win against Niort.

=== Levadiakos and Apollon Smyrnis ===
On 10 August 2013, Levadiakos announced the acquisition of Koné. He made his debut in the Greece Super League on 18 August, as coach Takis Lemonis sent him in the 68th minute to replace Armiche Ortega in a 2–2 draw against Panthrakikos. On 29 September, he scored his first goal in the competition in a 4–2 loss to Apollon Smyrnis. He netted a career-best seven goals until the end of the 2013–14 season.

On 1 July 2015, Koné made an oral agreement with Veria, but eventually he signed a contract with second-tier club Apollon Smyrnis. In 2015 and 2016, he was named the best foreign player of the second league at the Greek football PSAP awards. He helped Apollon gain promotion to the first league at the end of the 2016–17 season.

On 25 January 2019, Levadiakos officially announced the return of Koné. During this stint, he made his last appearances in the Greek league, totaling 94 matches with 12 goals in the competition. However, he could not help the team avoid relegation at the end of the 2018–19 season. Koné spent a further three seasons with Levadiakos and helped them achieve promotion back to the first league at the end of the 2021–22 season, retiring afterwards.

== International career ==
Koné was selected by coach Gérard Gili to be part of Ivory Coast's under-23 team during the 2008 Summer Olympics in Beijing. There, he played in three matches, as his side reached the quarter-finals, where they were defeated by Nigeria.

Koné made his debut for Ivory Coast on 8 June 2008, when coach Vahid Halilhodžić sent him in the 64th minute to replace Emerse Faé in a 0–0 away draw against Madagascar during the 2010 World Cup qualifiers. He made a total of seven appearances during those successful qualifiers. Koné was selected by Halilhodžić to be part of the 2010 Africa Cup of Nations squad, but he did not play in a single match during the competition. Subsequently, new coach Sven-Göran Eriksson included him in the squad for the 2010 World Cup, but once again he did not make a single appearance in the tournament. Koné made his last appearance for the national team on 4 January 2010 in a 1–0 friendly victory over Italy, totaling 15 matches for The Elephants.

== Career statistics ==
=== International ===
Appearances and goals by national team and year
National team	Year	Apps	Goals
Ivory Coast
Ivory Coast	2008	4	0
Ivory Coast	2009	7	0
Ivory Coast	2010	4	0
Total		15	0

== Honours ==
ASEC Mimosas

- Côte d'Ivoire Premier Division: 2004, 2005, 2006
- Côte d'Ivoire Cup: 2005, 2007

CFR Cluj

- Liga I: 2011–12
- Cupa României: 2008–09

Apollon Smyrnis

- Football League: 2016–17

Levadiakos

- Super League Greece 2: 2021–22

Individual

- Football League Best Foreign Player: 2015–16, 2016–17
