= Yakassé-Attobrou =

Yakassé-Attobrou Yakasséattobrou
- Town, sub-prefecture, commune
- Location in Ivory Coast
- Coordinates: 6°11′N 3°39′W
- Country: Ivory Coast
- District: Lagunes
- Region: La Mé
- Department: Yakassé-Attobrou
- Time zone: UTC+0 (GMT)

Yakassé-Attobrou is a town in southeastern Ivory Coast. It is a sub-prefecture of and the seat of Yakassé-Attobrou Department in La Mé Region, Lagunes District. Yakassé-Attobrou is also a commune.
