= Huevos rotos =

Egg based dish

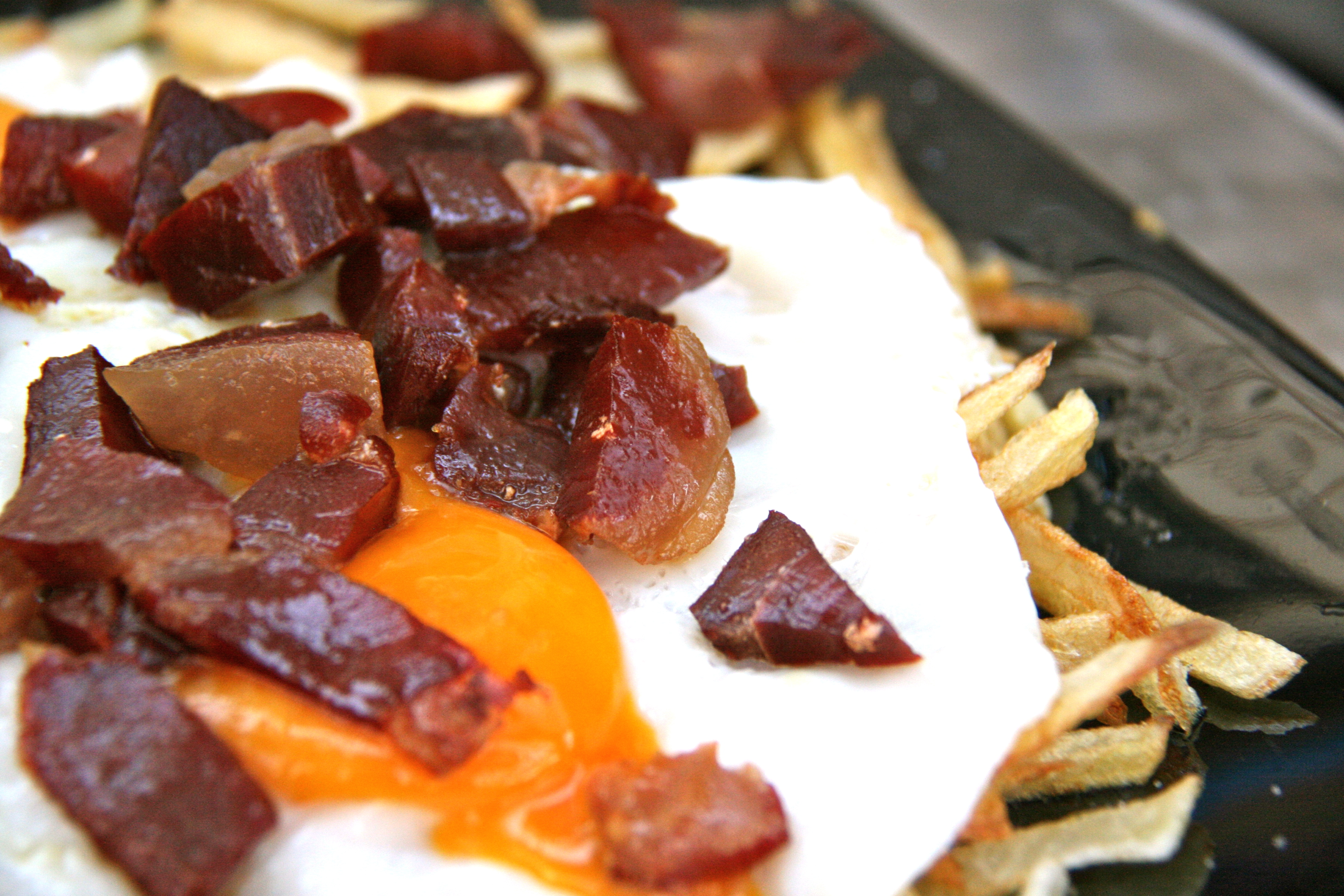
Close-up of huevos rotos with ham

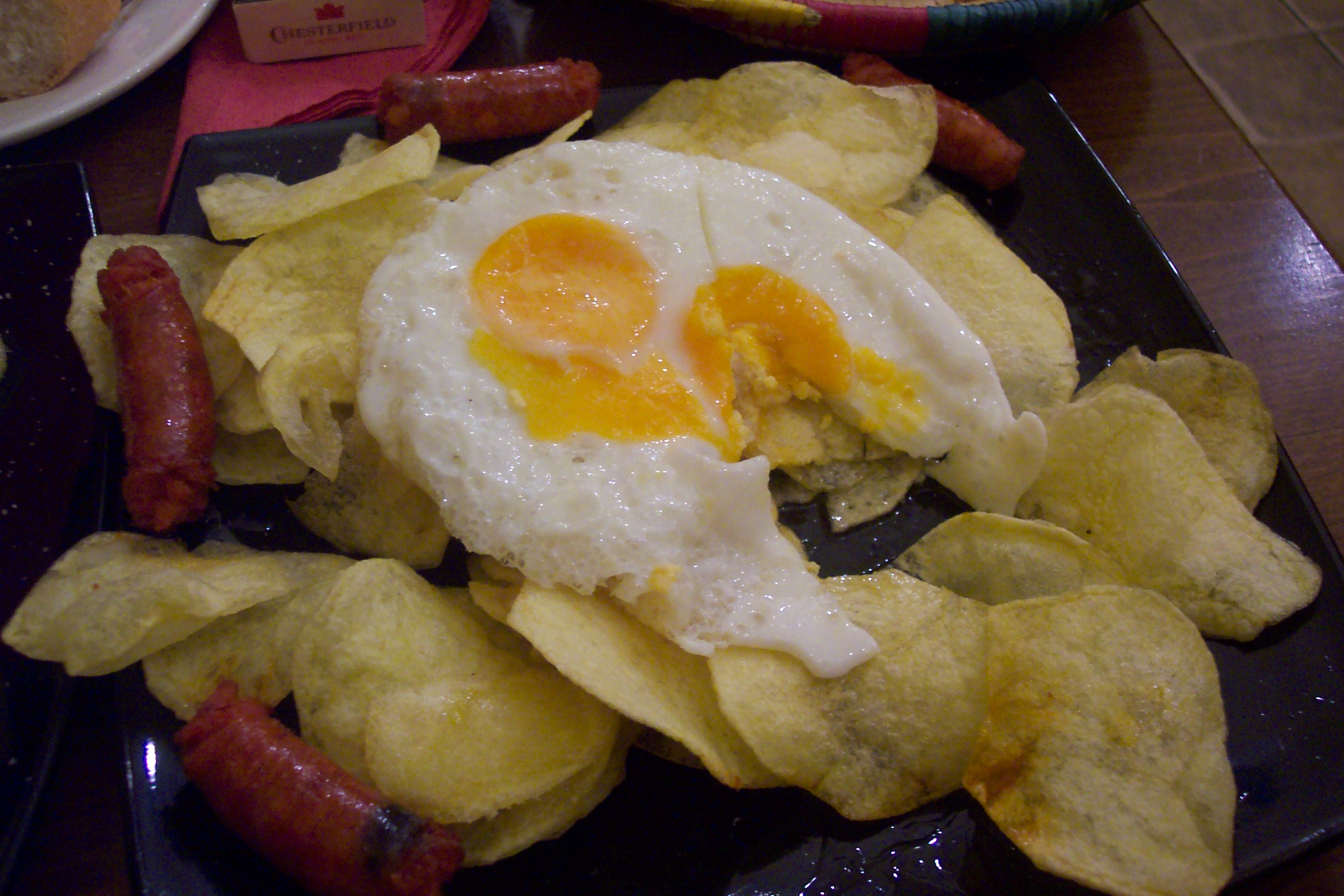
Huevos estrellados with chips and pieces of chistorra

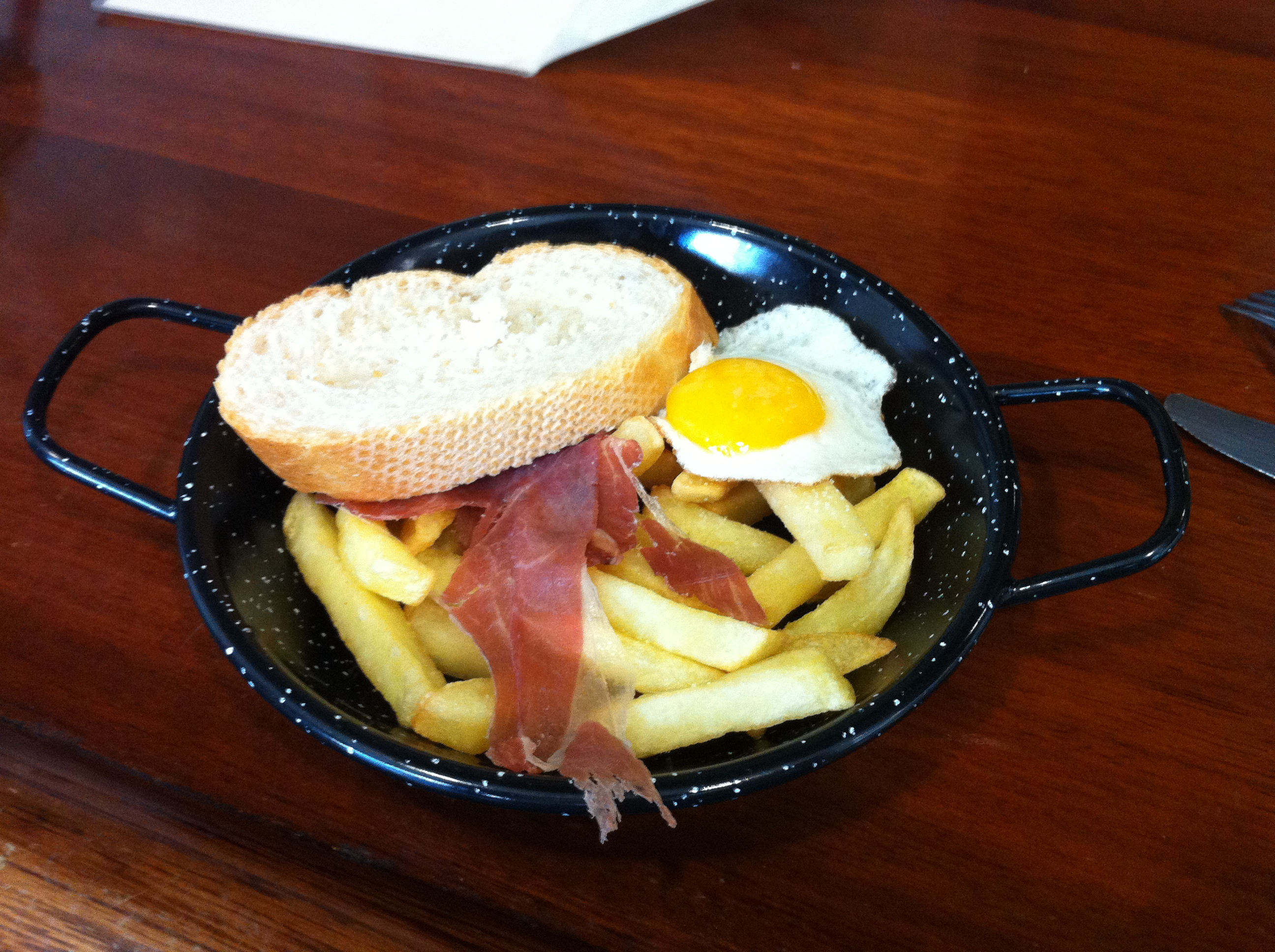
Huevos rotos

Huevos rotos or huevos estrellados is any of a number of Spanish dishes involving eggs fried in a large amount of olive oil or any other oil. In Madrid, huevos estrellados is a dish based on a pan-fried egg with a liquid yolk, accompanied by French fries (some modern versions of this dish use chips), some kind of meat (typically ham, bacon, or a sausage like chorizo or chistorra). The dish is served hot, immediately after plating.

== Serving ==
Huevos estrellados are typically served with potatoes. The potatoes serve to soak up the yolk of the egg. A variant of the dish known as duelos y quebrantos involves eggs that are scrambled instead of fried.
