= Abongoua =

Abongoua Abengoua
- Town and sub-prefecture
- Location in Ivory Coast
- Coordinates: 6°15′N 3°33′W
- Country: Ivory Coast
- District: Lagunes
- Region: La Mé
- Department: Yakassé-Attobrou

Population (2014)
  - Total: 12,197
- Time zone: UTC+0 (GMT)

Abongoua (also spelled Abengoua) is a town in south-eastern Ivory Coast. It is a sub-prefecture of Yakassé-Attobrou Department in La Mé Region, Lagunes District.

Abongoua was a commune until March 2012, when it became one of 1,126 communes nationwide that were abolished.
