= Allied Gold (Canada) =

Mining company

Allied Gold Corp
- Type: Public limited company
- Traded as: TSX: AAUC
- Industry: Mining
- Founded: 2011; 15 years ago
- Headquarters: Toronto, Ontario, Canada
- Products: Gold
- Website: alliedgold.com

Allied Gold Corporation is a Canadian-headquartered company that owns and operates gold mines in Mali, the Ivory Coast and Ethiopia. Headquartered in Toronto, the company listed on the Toronto Stock Exchange in 2023. As of 2023, the company produces 375,000 ounces of gold per year.

== Company structure and listing ==
Allied Gold corp (formerly, Mondavi Ventures Ltd) was founded in 2011, initially operating as a private company developing and acquiring gold assets in Africa.

In 2023, Allied Merger Corporation, a company formed by former executives of Yamana Gold with the purpose of exploring mining opportunities in Africa, executed a business combination agreement with Allied Gold Corporation. The reverse takeover transaction included a US$267 million financing agreement ahead of shares in Allied Gold Corporation going live on Toronto Stock Exchange.

On 11 September 2023, Allied Gold Corporation officially listed on the Toronto Stock Exchange, becoming the largest mining initial public offering since 2010 with a market capitalisation of US $970 million on the first day.

Allied Gold Corporation’s common shares trade in Canadian dollars under the symbol "AAUC" and the convertible debentures trading in U.S. dollars under the symbol "AAUC.DB.U.".

In January 2026, Chinese mining company Zijin Gold agreed to acquired Allied Gold for CA$5.5 billion.

== Leadership ==
As part of the 2023 agreement and after more than 10 years at the helm, co-founder and chief executive officer (CEO) of Allied Gold, Justin Dibb transitioned to the role of vice chairman.

The new management team is now be led by Peter Marrone, founder of Yamana Gold, as chairman and CEO. Also announced as part of the 2023 reverse take-over Daniel Racine and Jason LeBlanc retain their former Yamana positions as president and chief financial officer (CFO) respectively.

== Mining operations ==
Allied Gold Corporation operate two gold mining operations and one exploration project in development:

- The Sadiola Gold Mine in Mali.
- The Cote D’Ivoire complex, comprising the Bonikro and Agbaou gold projects that feature a number of open pit mines.
- The Kurmuk development project in Ethiopia, the subject of a $500 million development plan as of September 2023.
