= Christmas in the Basque Country =

Christmas in the Basque Country starts with the Feast of Santo Tomas on 21 December, a celebration in which most people go out onto the streets to dance and eat talo with txistorra (a type of Basque chorizo). They wear a traditional outfit called the casera dress. For women and girls it consists of a long skirt and a long-sleeved old-fashioned shirt with headscarves and aprons. The men and boys wear a long black shirt, trousers and txapela (traditional black beret). The casera outfits are normally dark blue, but can come in many colors. They wear caseras because that is what the people of the mountains wear, and the holiday used to celebrate the peasants who sold their goods in town, and came down on Santo Tomas to pay rent to landlords in the city.

== The Santa of Basque Country ==
In the Basque Country the equivalent of Santa is Olentzero, and Olentzero lives or lived (depending on what you believe) in the mountains, and he wears the boys' casera. He is a mythical Basque character who is widely portrayed as a messenger who cries out that it is Christmas time throughout all the corners of the Basque Country. In some versions, the Olentzero is a farmer or a shepherd. Nevertheless, it is common in all of the tales that the Olentzero brings good news to people.

He is also known as the coal man who comes down from the mountains on his pottok (wild Basque horse) to hand out presents to children. Chestnuts and wine are given to the villagers. By tradition, on December 24, the Basque television and radio stations broadcast that the Olentzero has begun his journey from the mountains to children's homes.

In Francoist Spain (1939 - 1975), Olentzero was banned as a symbol of regional separatism. It was only after the Spanish transition to democracy that the tradition was restored to the Basque Country.

== Christmas Day ==
On Christmas Day all the children in the Basque Country go to sleep early and they leave their shoes in the middle of whatever room in the house that isn't the bathroom or their bedroom. Olentzero leaves all the presents beside the shoes. On New Year's Day some people put on their casera dresses and they go sing to the retired people in the retirement home. The day after in the morning, whether it is raining or snowing, it's a tradition for some people to go swim in the sea (if there is a sea in their town or city). The one other day that is important to the Basques is the 6th of January (the Day of the Three Kings). On that night the same happens. The children leave their shoes out and in the night the Three Kings come and leave presents, but much less than Olentzero does.

== See also ==
- Talo
- Olentzero
- Basque mythology
