= Soune =

Soune is both a given name and a surname. Notable people with the name include:

- Soune Soungole (born 1995), Ivorian footballer
- Jade Soune-Seyne, Réunionese beauty pageant titleholder
