= Bécouéfin =

Bécouéfin Békuéfin
- Town and sub-prefecture
- Location in Ivory Coast
- Coordinates: 6°29′N 3°51′W
- Country: Ivory Coast
- District: Lagunes
- Region: La Mé
- Department: Akoupé

Population (2014)
  - Total: 24,610
- Time zone: UTC+0 (GMT)

Bécouéfin (also spelled Békuéfin) is a town in south-eastern Ivory Coast. It is a sub-prefecture of Akoupé Department in La Mé Region, Lagunes District.

Bécouéfin was a commune until March 2012, when it became one of 1,126 communes nationwide that were abolished.
