= Achille Anani =

Ivorian footballer (born 1994)

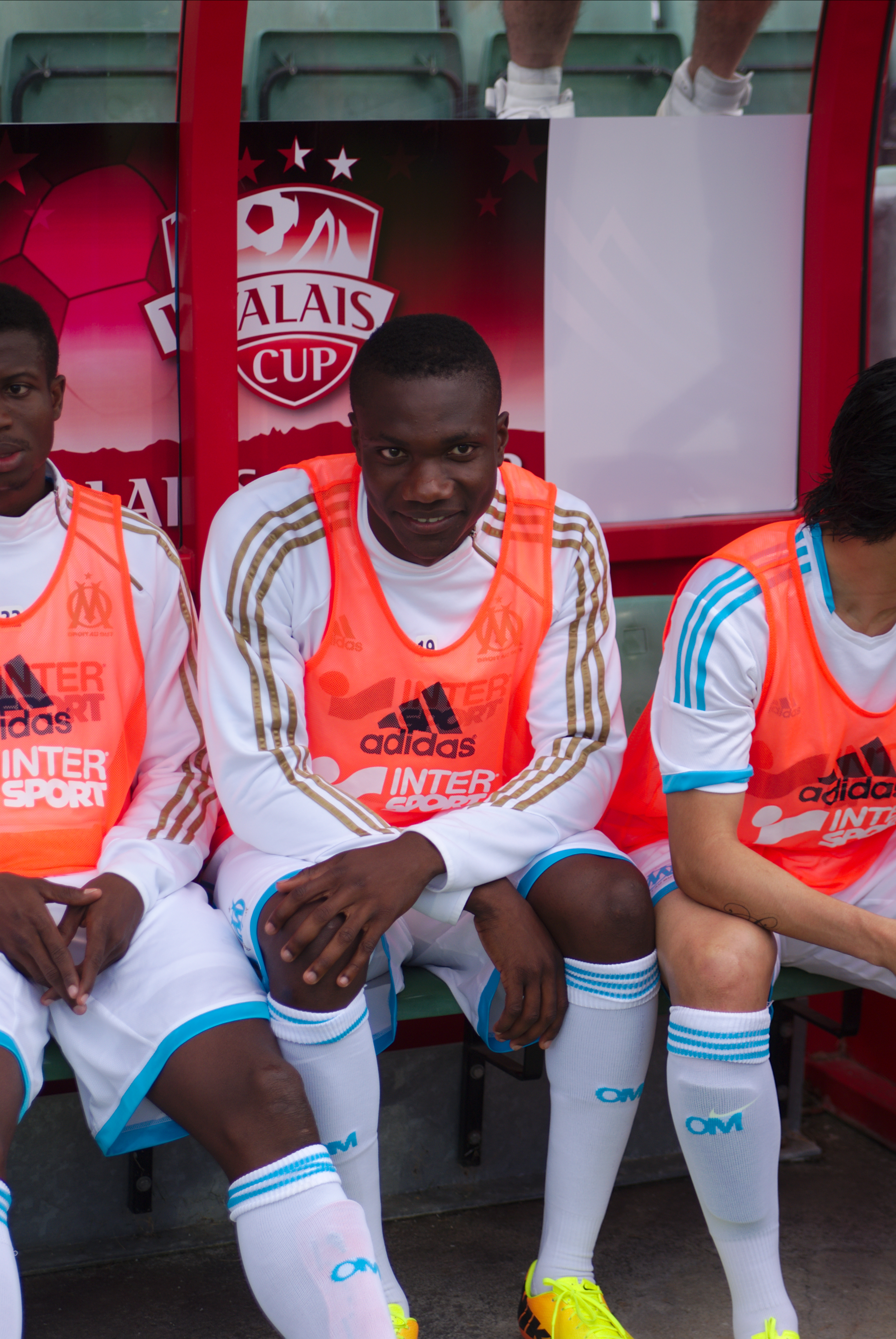
- Anani on the bench for Marseille's game during the Valais Cup in 2013

Personal information
- Full name: Marcellin Achille Anani Junior
- Date of birth: 27 December 1994 (age 31)
- Place of birth: Aboisso-Comoé, Ivory Coast
- Height: 1.79 m (5 ft 10 in)
- Position: Forward

Youth career
- 2004–2008: Aubervilliers
- 2008–2010: CFFP
- 2010–2012: Marseille

Senior career*
Years	Team	Apps	(Gls)
2011–2014	Marseille B		
2012–2014	Marseille	0	(0)
2015	Dinamo Vranje	7	(2)
2017	Aubagne	13	(1)
2017–2019	Marseille Endoume	46	(26)
2019–2020	Bourg-en-Bresse	23	(16)
2020–2022	Grenoble	69	(12)
2022–2025	Red Star	42	(7)
2025	→ Villefranche (loan)	14	(0)
2025–2026	Quevilly-Rouen	12	(4)
- * Club domestic league appearances and goals as of 23 June 2026

Marcellin Achille Anani Junior (born 27 December 1994), commonly known as Achille Anani, is an Ivorian professional footballer who plays as a forward.

== Career ==
Born in Aboisso-Comoé, Anani spent his early years at Aubervilliers and CFFP, before joining Marseille to complete his formation. He made eight appearances and scored two goals for the youth setup in the NextGen Series (2011–13). Simultaneously, Anani featured for Marseille's reserves in the CFA 2. He was eventually promoted to the senior squad in 2012, being an unused substitute in official matches on several occasions.

In June 2014, after leaving Marseille, Anani was linked with Austrian club Red Bull Salzburg, but the deal never went through. He subsequently went on trial with Serbian top-flight club Radnički Niš in early 2015, but failed to get a contract. In the summer of 2015, Anani signed with Serbian second-tier club Dinamo Vranje. He appeared in seven games and scored twice for the side, before leaving after just a few months.

In early 2017, after being without a club for more than a year, Anani returned to France and joined CFA 2 side Aubagne. In October he left Aubagne and signed for Marseille Endoume in the now renamed Championnat National 3.

On 31 May 2019, Anani joined Bourg-en-Bresse.

On 9 August 2022, Anani signed with Red Star. On 14 January 2025, he was loaned to Villefranche.

On 19 August 2025, Anani moved to Quevilly-Rouen.

== Honours ==
Red Star

- Championnat National: 2023–24
