= Sikensi =

- Town, sub-prefecture, and commune
- Location in Ivory Coast
- Coordinates: 5°40′N 4°34′W
- Country: Ivory Coast
- District: Lagunes
- Region: Agnéby-Tiassa
- Department: Sikensi

Area
  - Total: 441 km^{2} (170 sq mi)

Population (2021 census)
  - Total: 91,032
  - Density: 206/km^{2} (535/sq mi)
- Time zone: UTC+0 (GMT)

Sikensi is a town in southeastern Ivory Coast. It is a sub-prefecture of and the seat of Sikensi Department in Agnéby-Tiassa Region, Lagunes District. Sikensi is also a commune.

In 2021, the population of the sub-prefecture of Sikensi was 91,032.

== Villages ==
The 13 villages of the sub-prefecture of Sikensi and their populations in 2014 are:

1. Abiéhou (1,923)
2. Badasso (3,438)
3. Bakanou (7,182)
  1. Bakanou A (2,986)
  2. Bakanou B (4,196)
4. Brafouéby (1,657)
5. Bécédi (7,364)
6. Ellibou-Badasso (9,313)
  1. Badasso (3,438)
  2. Ellibou (5,875)
7. Katadji (3,686)
8. Sikensi (7,308)
9. Sikensi 3 (6,710)
10. Sikensi A (3,813)
11. Sikensi B (6,396)
12. Soukou-Obou (2,207)
