= Aboisso-Comoé =

- Town and sub-prefecture
- Location in Ivory Coast
- Coordinates: 5°58′N 3°24′W
- Country: Ivory Coast
- District: Lagunes
- Region: La Mé
- Department: Alépé

Area
  - Total: 231 km^{2} (89 sq mi)

Population (2021 census)
  - Total: 33,471
  - Density: 145/km^{2} (375/sq mi)
  - Town: 15,937
- (2014 census)
- Time zone: UTC+0 (GMT)

Aboisso-Comoé is a town in south-eastern Ivory Coast. It is a sub-prefecture of Alépé Department in La Mé Region, Lagunes District.

Aboisso-Comoé was a commune until March 2012, when it became one of 1,126 communes nationwide that were abolished.
