= Agou, Ivory Coast =

Agou
- Town, sub-prefecture, and commune
- Location in Ivory Coast
- Coordinates: 5°59′N 3°57′W
- Country: Ivory Coast
- District: Lagunes
- Region: La Mé
- Department: Adzopé

Population (2014)
  - Total: 26,692
- Time zone: UTC+0 (GMT)

Agou is a town in south-eastern Ivory Coast. It is a sub-prefecture of Adzopé Department in La Mé Region, Lagunes District. Agou is also a commune.
