= Danguira =

- Town and sub-prefecture
- Location in Ivory Coast
- Coordinates: 5°40′N 3°46′W
- Country: Ivory Coast
- District: Lagunes
- Region: La Mé
- Department: Alépé

Population (2014)
  - Total: 38,417
- Time zone: UTC+0 (GMT)

Danguira is a town in south-eastern Ivory Coast. It is a sub-prefecture of Alépé Department in La Mé Region, Lagunes District.

Danguira was a commune until March 2012, when it became one of 1,126 communes nationwide that were abolished.

== Villages ==
The 13 villages of the sub-prefecture of Nébo and their population in 2014 are:

1. Ahouakoi (803)
2. Angobèkoi (2,195)
3. Angoikoi (1,183)
4. Danguira (8,857)
5. Dzeudji (5,400)
6. Kodioussou (6,139)
7. Kossandji (4,184)
8. Mafia (3,614)
9. Mobiokoi (944)
10. Mopodji (1,994)
11. N'Sankoi (1,102)
12. Tèbikoi (935)
13. Yapokoi (1,067)
