= Matteo Piccinni =

Italian footballer

Personal information
- Date of birth: 6 March 1986 (age 40)
- Place of birth: Milan, Italy
- Height: 1.87 m (6 ft 2 in)
- Position: Centre back

Team information
- Current team: Franciacorta
- Number: 77

Senior career*
Years	Team	Apps	(Gls)
2004–2005	Como	2	(0)
2005–2009	Udinese	0	(0)
2006–2007	→ Pizzighettone (loan)	28	(2)
2007–2008	→ Massese (loan)	28	(1)
2008–2009	→ Pisa (loan)	13	(0)
2009–2014	AlbinoLeffe	110	(1)
2012–2013	→ Padova (loan)	10	(0)
2014–2015	Real Vicenza	33	(3)
2015–2017	Matera	40	(1)
2017–2019	Gubbio	67	(0)
2019–2020	Bisceglie	17	(0)
2020	Chiasso	15	(2)
2020–	Franciacorta	63	(4)
- * Club domestic league appearances and goals as of 28 September 2022

Matteo Piccinni (born 6 March 1986) is an Italian professional footballer who plays for Serie D club Franciacorta.

== Biography ==
Born in Milan, Lombardy, Piccinni started his career at Lombard club Calcio Como. Piccinni joined Udinese Calcio after Como folded in 2005. Udinese also sold 50% registration rights of Piccinni to Empoli in January 2006 but bought back in June 2006. In 2006, he left for Pizzighettone. In 2007, he was signed by Massese. In 2008 Piccinni was signed by Serie B club Pisa Calcio.

In July 2009 he was signed by AlbinoLeffe in co-ownership deal for €150,000 in 4-year contract. In June 2010 AlbinoLeffe acquired the remain 50% registration rights for €1,000. Piccinni was a player for AlbinoLeffe in Serie B until relegation in 2012. On 20 August 2012 Piccinni left for Serie B club Calcio Padova with Adama Diakité moved to opposite direction. Circa 2012 Piccinni also extended his contract with AlbinoLeffe. After the expiry of his loan, Piccinni continued his AlbinoLeffe career in Lega Pro Prima Divisione.

On 2 August 2019, he signed a 1-year deal with Bisceglie.

On 17 January 2020, he moved to Swiss club Chiasso until the end of the season.
