= Akoupé =

- Town, sub-prefecture, and commune
- Location in Ivory Coast
- Coordinates: 6°23′N 3°54′W
- Country: Ivory Coast
- District: Lagunes
- Region: La Mé
- Department: Akoupé

Area
  - Total: 698 km^{2} (269 sq mi)

Population (2021 census)
  - Total: 79,065
  - Density: 113/km^{2} (293/sq mi)
  - Town: 26,668
- (2014 census)
- Time zone: UTC+0 (GMT)

Akoupé is a town in south-eastern Ivory Coast. It is a sub-prefecture of and the seat of Akoupé Department in La Mé Region, Lagunes District. Akoupé is also a commune.
