= Olentzero =

Character in Basque Christmas tradition

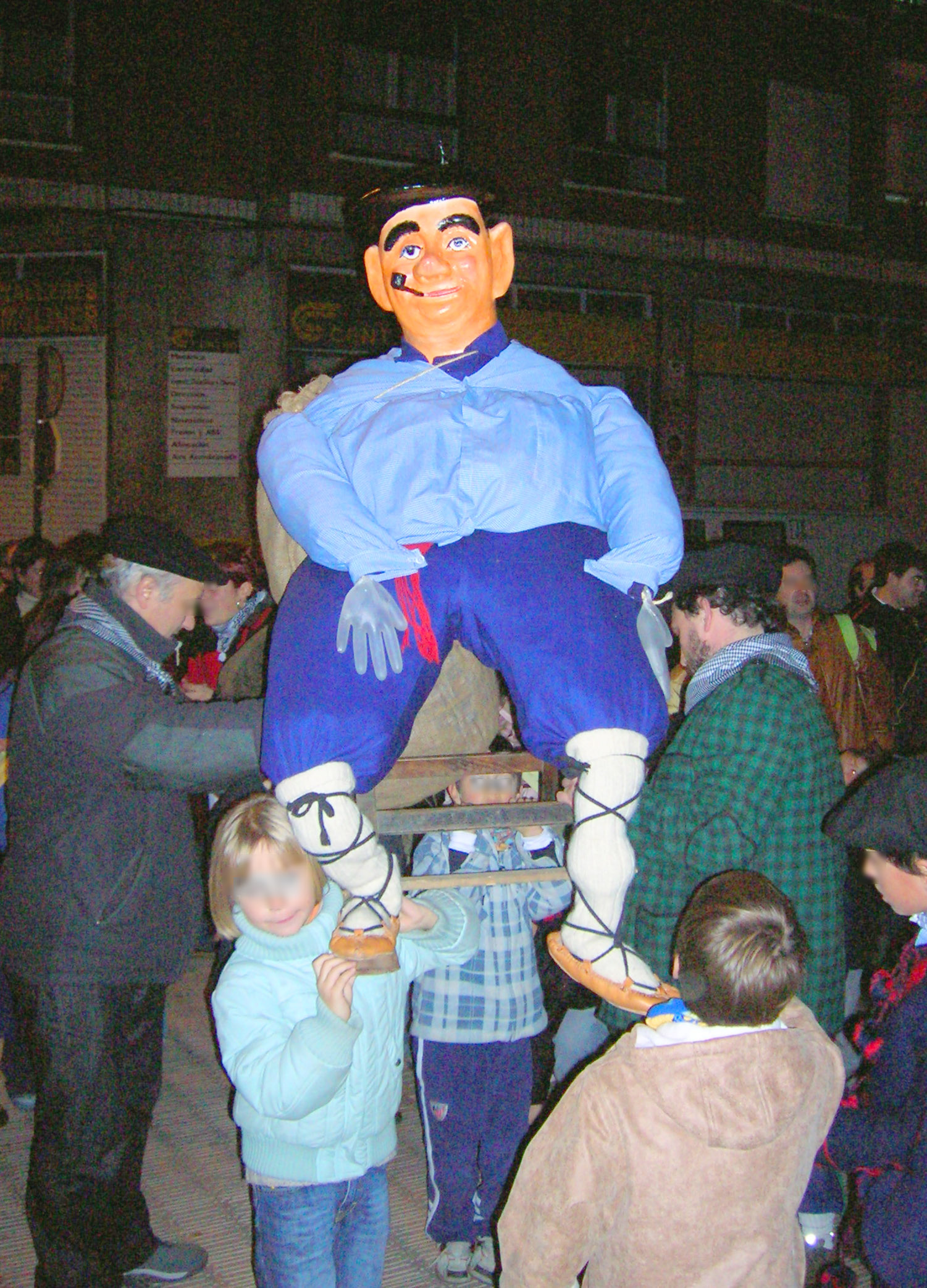
A figure of Olen being carried through the streets of Barakaldo

Olentzero (Basque pronunciation: [olents̻eɾo], sometimes Olentzaro or Olantzaro and Olenchero) is a character in Basque Christmas tradition. According to Basque traditions, Olentzero comes to town late at night on 24 December to drop off presents for children. In some places he arrives later, for example in Ochagavía – Otsagabia on the 27th and in Ermua on the 31st.

== The name ==
The name Olentzero appears in a number of variations: Onenzaro, Onentzaro, Olentzaro, Ononzaro, Orentzago and others. The earliest records give the name as Onentzaro and the name is most likely composed of two elements, on "good" plus a genitive plural ending and the suffix -zaro which in Basque denotes a season (compare words like haurtzaro "childhood"), so "time of the good ones" literally. This suggests a derivation similar to the Spanish nochebuena.

Other theories of derivation exist but are not generally accepted:

- from a metathesis of Noël, theory of S. Altube
- from a fusion of O Nazarene from Christian liturgy, theory of J. Gorostiaga
- from oles-aro "alms season", a phonologically impossible derivation by Julio Caro Baroja

In parts of Navarre this holiday is called xubilaro or subilaro from subil, the word for a Yule log plus the suffix -zaro. In parts of Lower Navarre the word suklaro is used, a contraction of sekularo. Sekularo has no clear etymology but is likely to be related to Latin saecularis.

== The legend ==
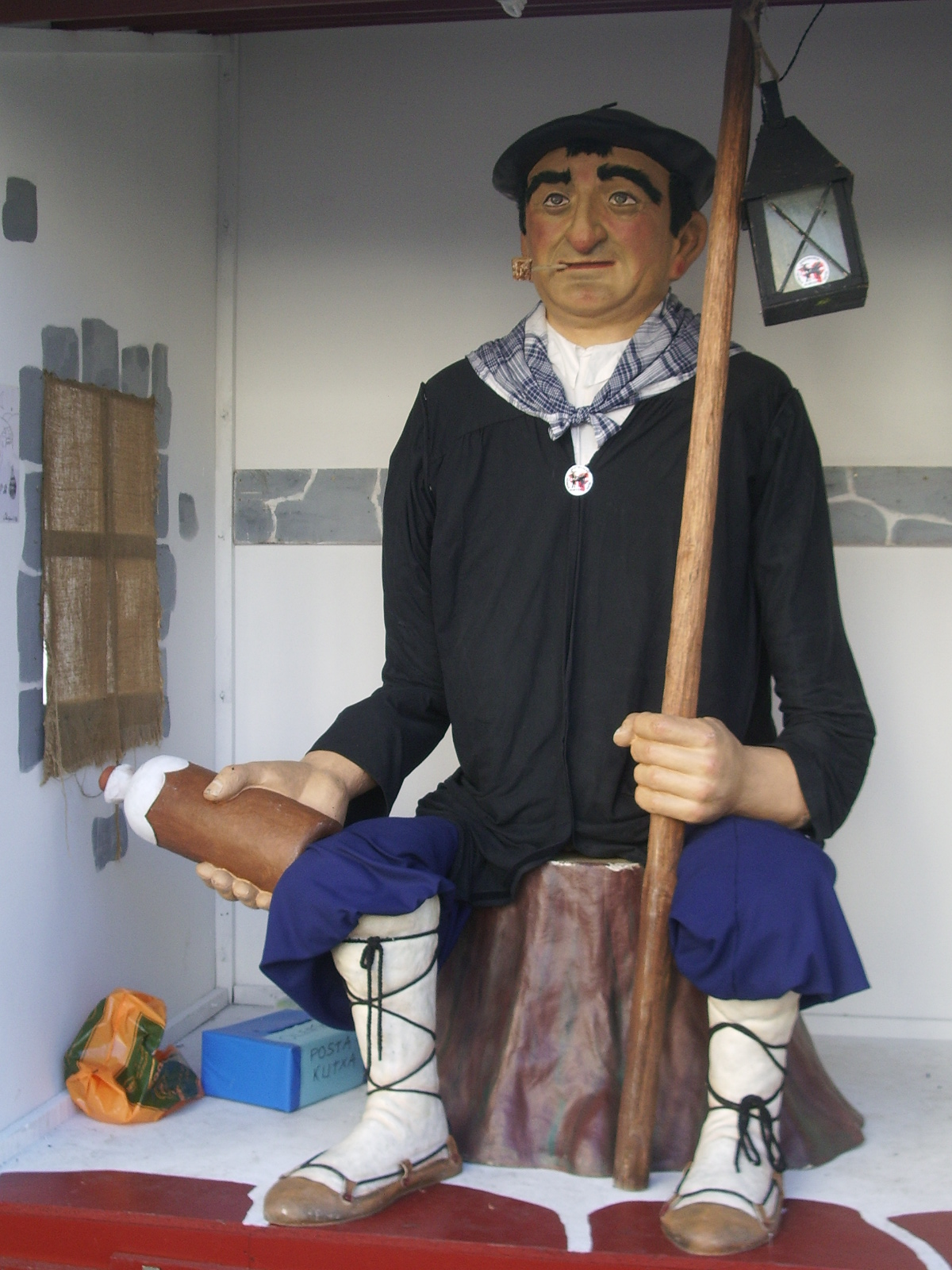
An effigy of Olentzero in Hendaia

There are many variations to the Olentzero traditions and stories connected to him, sometimes varying from village to village. The first written account of Olentzero is from Lope de Isasti in the 17th century: A la noche de Navidad (llamamos) onenzaro, la sazón de los buenos ("To Christmas eve (we call) onenzaro, the season of the good ones").

One common version has Olentzero being one of the Jentillak, a race of Basque giants living in the Pyrenees. Legend has it that they observed a glowing cloud in the sky one day. They could not look at this bright cloud except for a very old, nearly blind man. When asked to examine it, he confirmed their fears and told them that it was a sign that Jesus would be born soon. According to some stories, the old man asked the giants to throw him off a cliff to avoid having to live through Christianisation. Having obliged him, the giants tripped on the way down and died themselves except Olentzero.

Other versions have the jentillak simply leaving, with only Olentzero remaining behind to embrace Christianity.

Other versions of the Olentzeroren kondaira, or "history of Olentzero", tell that as a new born he was abandoned in the woods and was found by a fairy who gave him the name Olentzero, bestowed gifts of strength and kindness on him and handed him to an older childless couple living alone in the woods. He turned into a strong man and charcoal burner who was also good with his hands, carving wooden toys that he would carry in a big charcoal bag to give to the children of the village. It is said that he died one day saving children from a burning house and that when he died, the fairy who had found him granted him eternal life to continue to bring joy to children and people.

Other variations of the legend, customs and the character include:

- in Areso children would be told to come home early. An adult would then dress up as Olentzero and scare the children still out on the streets with a sickle.
- in Uharte-Arakil he was traditionally suspended from a rope from a window, dressed in a straw mantle, in Lekunberri the effigy was attached to the chimney.
- in Berastegi if the children did not want to go to bed, a sickle would be thrown down the chimney and the children told that Olentzero would come to cut their throats if they did not go to bed.
- in Dima a straw puppet dressed as Olentzero with a sickle would be hung from the church tower after the midnight mass on Christmas Eve and if children had been behaving badly, people would say Onontzaro begi-gorri txaminira da etorri, austen baldin badegu barua, orrek lepoa kendu guri "Olentzero with the red eyes has come to the chimney, if we break the fast, he will cut our throats" - referring to the traditional fast in the week before Christmas.
- in Larraun he was called Ononzaro and said to have three eyes and usually depicted as a drunkard dressed like a scarecrow. People would ask Ononzaro begi-gorri, non arrapatu duk arrai ori? (Olentzero of the red eyes, where did you catch that fish (i.e. inebriation)?) and the answer would be Bart arratseko amaiketan Zurriolako arroketan (last night at eleven in the rocks of Zurriola).

== Modern customs and derivation ==
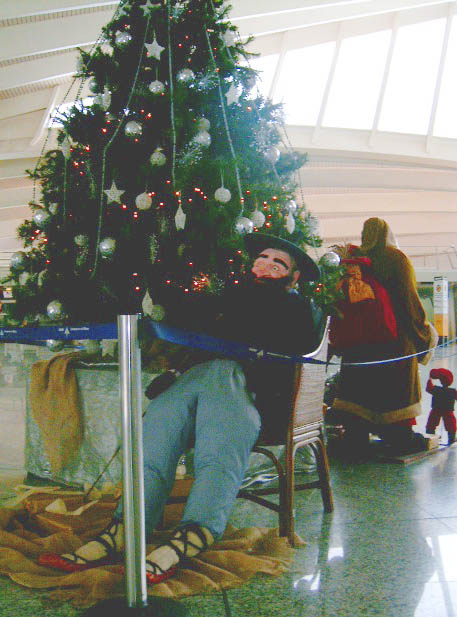
Olentzero alongside other Christmas symbols at the Bilbao-Loiu airport

Around 1952, in Francoist Spain, a group called Irrintzi Elkartea from Zarautz began to revive the Olentzero traditions. Some of the more gruesome elements were removed to make Olentzero more suitable for young children and to remove elements which were deemed too pagan. From 1956 onwards, the revived Olentzero traditions began to spread outside those parts of Gipuzkoa where the traditions hailed from. During the 1970s he began to take on further new attributes, such as the bringer of gifts in attempts to find an alternative to the Spanish tradition of the Magi and the French Père Noël, summed up in the slogan Erregeak, españolak "the Three Wise Men are Spanish". Today Olentzero is celebrated all over the Basque Country and coexists with the Magi, Père Noël and Father Christmas, some families choosing to celebrate one or more at the same time.

In the modern version, Olentzero is depicted as a lovable character, widely attributed to being overweight, having a huge appetite and thirst. He is depicted as a Basque peasant wearing a Basque beret, a farmer's attire with traditional abarketa shoes, smoking a pipe, carrying eggs and a bottle of wine. Whether he has a beard or not is not yet an established tradition. Sometimes his face is stained with charcoal, as a sign of his trade as a charcoal-burner. On Christmas Eve, groups of people or children carry effigies of Olentzero around on a chair through the streets, singing Olentzero carols and collecting food or sweets (not unlike the American trick or treat) and the traditions surrounding the holiday of Santa Ageda in the Basque Country where oles egitea "asking for alms" is practised. At the end, it is customary in some places to burn the Olentzero, for example in Lesaka.

Variation is still common, both regionally and culturally depending on whether the pagan or Christian aspects of Olentzaro are being emphasised. Near the sea, he is usually takes on more marine attributes; inland he remains thoroughly rural in nature.

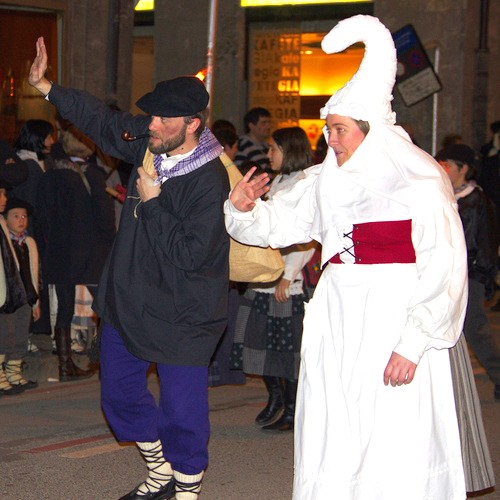
Olentzero and Mari Domingi in Tolosa, 2012.

Since 1994, he has started to be accompanied by Mari Domingi, a character previously mentioned in a Basque Christmas carol. Mari Domingi is depicted as a woman in medieval Basque dress. Her addition brings gender parity to Basque Christmas gift-bringing.

== Olentzero songs ==
Similar to European Christmas carols, there are Olentzero kantak. Two very common ones are:

=== Olentzero ===
Olentzero joan zaigu mendira lanera, intentzioarekin ikatz egitera. Aditu duenean Jesus jaio dela lasterka etorri da berri ematera. Horra horra gure Olentzero pipa hortzetan dula eserita dago. Kapoiak ere ba'itu arraultzatxoekin bihar meriendatzeko botila ardoakin. Olentzero gurea ezin dugu ase osorik jan dizkigu hamar txerri gazte. Saiheski ta solomo horrenbeste heste Jesus jaio delako erruki zaitezte. Olentzerok dakarzki atsegin ta poza jakin baitu mendian Jesusen jaiotza. Egun argi honetan alaitu bihotza kanpo eta barruan kendu azkar hotza.	Olentzero has gone to the mountains to work with the intention of making charcoal. When he heard that Jesus has been born he came running to bring news There is, there is our Olentzero with the pipe between his teeth while he's sitting. He also has capons with little eggs, to celebrate tomorrow with a bottle of wine. Our Olentzero we can't sate him he has eaten whole ten piglets. Ribs and pork loin so many intestines because Jesus is born have mercy. Olentzero brings happiness and joy because he has heard on the mountain of Jesus' birth. On this bright day heart, rejoice outside and inside quickly loose the chill.

=== Olentzero buru handia ===
The title translates as "Olentzero big head". An arroba is an old measure equivalent to 25 lbs. or just over 11 kg.

Olentzero buru handia entendimentuz jantzia bart arratsean edan omen du hamar arroako zahagia. Ai urde tripahandia! Tralaralala, tralaralala. Ai urde tripahandia! Tralaralala, tralaralala.	Olentzero big head robed in understanding is said to have drunk last night a wineskin of ten arrobas Oh big-bellied pig! Tralaralala, tralaralala. Oh big-bellied pig! Tralaralala, tralaralala.
