= Annépé =

- Town and sub-prefecture
- Location in Ivory Coast
- Coordinates: 5°54′N 3°46′W
- Country: Ivory Coast
- District: Lagunes
- Region: La Mé
- Department: Adzopé

Population (2014)
  - Total: 19,925
- Time zone: UTC+0 (GMT)

Annépé is a town in south-eastern Ivory Coast. It is a sub-prefecture of Adzopé Department in La Mé Region, Lagunes District.

Annépé was a commune until March 2012, when it became one of 1,126 communes nationwide that were abolished.
