= Chistorra =

Type of sausage from Spain

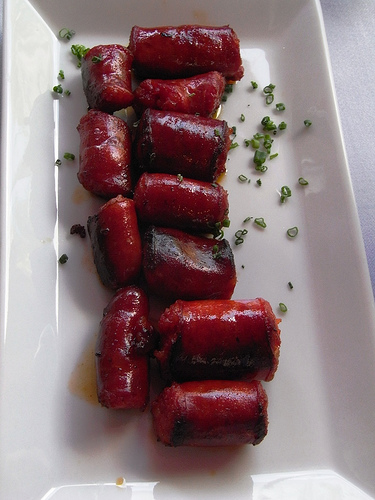
- A tapa of fried chistorra
- Alternative names: Birika, Berika, Txistorra
- Place of origin: Spain
- Region or state: Navarre
- Main ingredients: minced pork

Chistorra (pronounced [tʃis̺ˈtora], Basque: txistor) is a type of fast-cure sausage from Navarre, Spain. It can be considered a special type of chorizo. It is made of minced pork, or a mixture of minced pork and beef, is encased in either lamb tripe or plastic and has a fat content of 70–80%. The sausage is flavoured with garlic, salt and paprika, which gives it a bright-red colour. It is usually baked, fried or grilled and often accompanies other dishes, sometimes as part of tapas. The final cured product tends to be thinner than traditional chorizo or sausage, with a diameter of approximately 25 mm (1.0 in). The sausages average 40 cm (16 in) in length, though there are cases when they reach up to 1 m (3 ft 3 in) long.

In the Aragonese Pyrenees, there are two different types of chistorra: one made only of pork meat and another made of lungs, boned pig head and the pancreas, called berica.

The local variety of chistorra available in the province of León is called Chistorra de León and is made with a larger percentage of beef.

Today it is sold fresh, but is increasingly found vacuum-packed in Spanish supermarkets.

== Preparations ==
One of the most popular dishes involving chistorra is huevos rotos con chistorra y patatas, a dish with fried eggs and potatoes.

Chistorra is usually fried whole, but served chopped into smaller sections as a tapa. Fried chistorra is often accompanied by beer or wine, especially of the Txakoli variety. Fried chistorra is also a typical bocadillo (sandwich) filler (bocadillo de chistorra).

Other common dishes include croissant preñado, a croissant with chistorra filler, and tortilla con chistorra, a potato or egg omelet with chistorra.

Chistorra is traditionally served on the feast day of Thomas the Apostle (December 21) in San Sebastián. During the festivities, chistorra is often served alongside talo and is accompanied by cider.

== Tradition ==
The 21st of December in the Basque Country is the day of Santo Tomás, during this day in all the cities you can see stalls of artisanal products among which, for being the typical food of the day, the talo, the chistorra and the cider or sagardoa as a usual accompaniment.

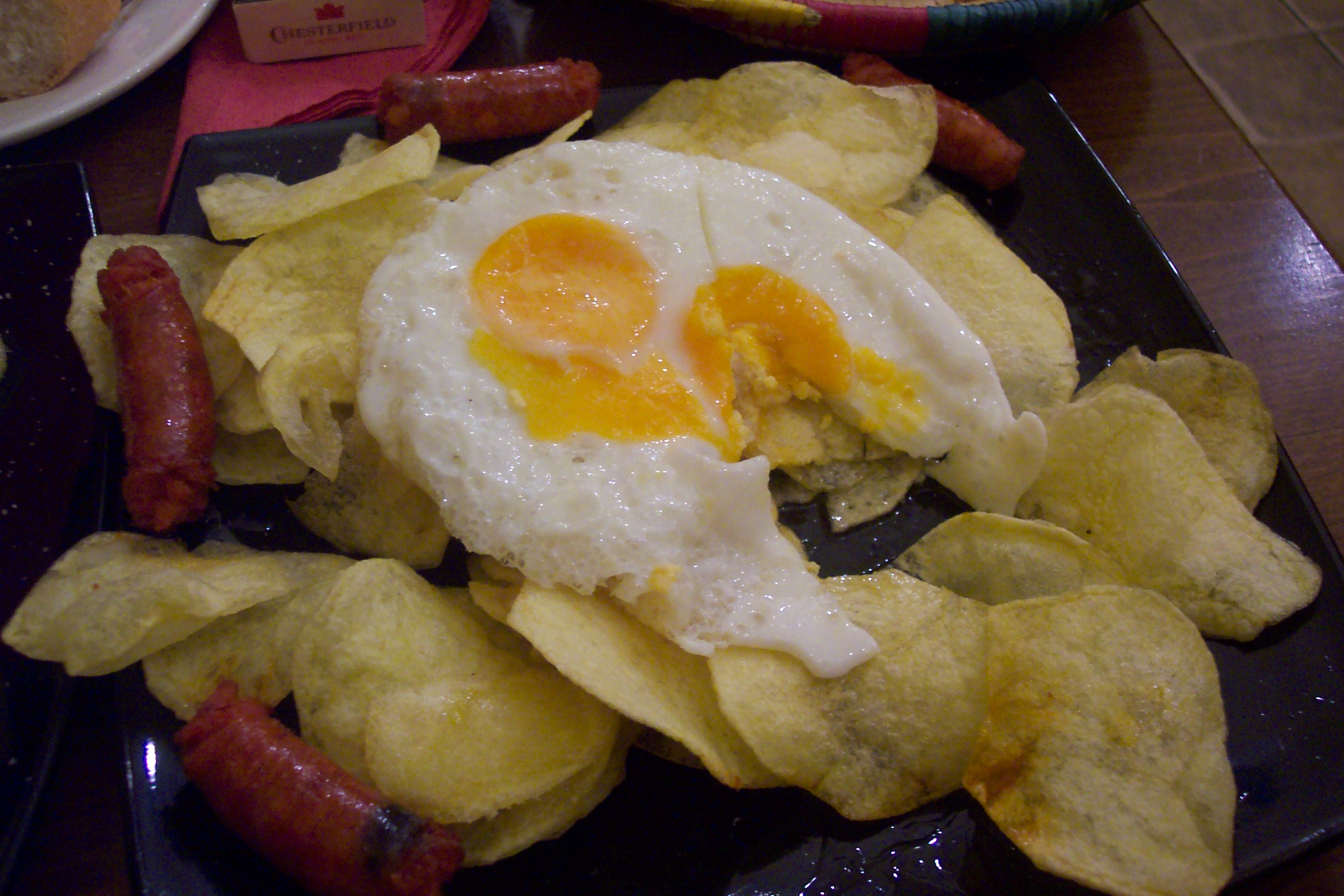
Huevos rotos con chistorra y patatas, a popular dish

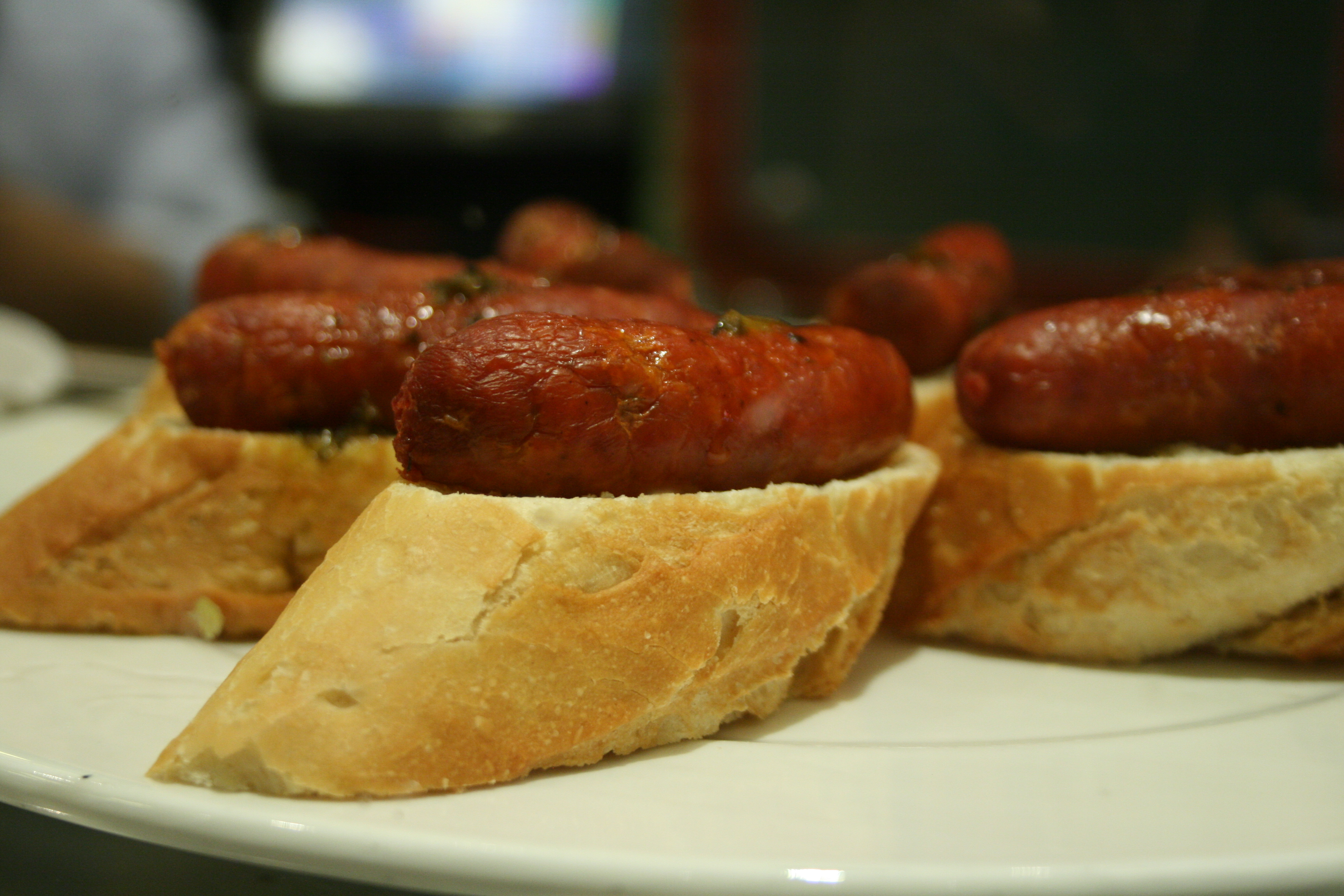
A tapa of fried chistorra on toast

== See also ==
- Basque cuisine
- Christmas in the Basque Country
- List of sausages
