= Kacou Philippe =

Ivory Coast religious leader

- Born: Kacou Philippe; December 1972 (age 53); Katadji, Ivory Coast
- Citizenship: Ivorian
- Occupations: Author and preacher

Kacou Philippe (Katadji, December 1972) is a self-proclaimed Christian prophet from the Ivory Coast. He supports white supremacy, believing that Black Africans should be subordinate to white people.

== Early life ==
Kacou Philippe was born in December 1972 in Katadji, Côte d’Ivoire. He is the son of an illiterate farmer. After completing primary school, he attended the first four years of secondary education. Between 1992 and 2002, he worked mainly as a construction laborer.

== Career ==
On 24 April 1993, Philippe received a supernatural visit, which reportedly delivered messages that distorted the word of God, which became a part of Kacou's doctrine. He took this event as a message from God, and initially went to a Catholic priest before following William Branham's views. He remained a follower of this movement from 1993 to 2002.

== Views ==
Philippe claimed that society is living a new age, and that he was its prophet. His teachings are published in The Book of Kacou Philippe, a three-volume work, wherein he claims that the Bible is a "history book" and that he is "the only prophet of God on earth during this generation".

== Controversies ==
Kacou Philippe is known for his hostilities to other pastors and prophets.

On 22 June 2008, a confrontation erupted between Philippe and Zakpa Dadié Étienne in Yopougon. Dadié Zakpa said that there would be no other prophets other than him, which Philippe rejected. According to his Branhamist views, another prophet would come to bring a new message, specifically Kacou Philippe.

== Arrest ==
On May 13, 2016, Philippe was arrested by elements of the Ivorian General Intelligence Services at his home in Katadji. On May 20th, he was transferred to MACA (Maison d'arrêt et correction d'Abidjan). Under the grounds of inciting religious intolerance and hate speech, he was jailed for one year. Philippe was released on August 15, 2016.
