= Soune Soungole =

Nigerien football midfielder

Personal information
- Full name: Soune Daniel Soungole
- Date of birth: 26 February 1995 (age 31)
- Place of birth: Agbaou-Ahéoua, Ivory Coast
- Height: 1.74 m (5 ft 9 in)
- Position: Defensive midfielder

Youth career
- Slovan Liberec

Senior career*
Years	Team	Apps	(Gls)
2014–2016	Slovan Liberec	18	(0)
2014	→ Spartak Trnava (loan)	1	(0)
2016	→ Teplice (loan)	9	(0)
2016–2020	Teplice	28	(0)
2020–2021	Busaiteen		
2022	Viktoria Žižkov	4	(0)
2022–	Sokol Brozany	69	(4)

International career
2011	Ivory Coast U17	9	(0)
2019–2021	Niger	4	(0)
- * Club domestic league appearances and goals as of 3 March 2025

Soune Daniel Soungole (born 26 February 1995) is a footballer who plays as a midfielder. Born in Ivory Coast, he represents Niger.

== Honours ==
Slovan Liberec

- Czech Cup: 2014–15
