= Alépé =

- Town, sub-prefecture, and commune
- Location in Ivory Coast
- Coordinates: 5°30′N 3°40′W
- Country: Ivory Coast
- District: Lagunes
- Region: La Mé
- Department: Alépé

Population (2014)
  - Total: 40,480
- Time zone: UTC+0 (GMT)

Alépé is a town in south-eastern Ivory Coast. It is a sub-prefecture of and the seat of Alépé Department in La Mé Region, Lagunes District. Alépé is also a commune.

== Notable people ==
- Wilfried Eza, footballer
