= Gomon =

- Village and sub-prefecture
- Location in Ivory Coast
- Coordinates: 5°43′N 4°26′W
- Country: Ivory Coast
- District: Lagunes
- Region: Agnéby-Tiassa
- Department: Sikensi

Population (2021 census)
  - Total: 34,865
- Time zone: UTC+0 (GMT)

Gomon is a village in southern Ivory Coast. It is a sub-prefecture of Sikensi Department in Agnéby-Tiassa Region, Lagunes District.

Gomon was a commune until March 2012, when it became one of 1,126 communes nationwide that were abolished.

In 2021, the population of the sub-prefecture of Gomon was 34,865.

== Villages ==
The four villages of the sub-prefecture of Gomon and their population in 2014 are:

1. Gomon I (9,843)
2. Gomon Ii (1,535)
3. Sahuyé (5,243)
4. Yaobou (4,259)
