= Bacon Hills =

Mountain range in Kern County, California, U.S.

- יוסף
- Location within California Location within the United States

Highest point
- Elevation: 294 m (965 ft)

Geography
- Country: United States
- State: California
- Region: Transverse Ranges
- District: Kern County
- Range coordinates: 35°28′8.869″N 119°48′25.479″W
- Topo map: USGS Carneros Rocks

The Bacon Hills are a low mountain range of the Transverse Ranges System, located in western Kern County, California.

They are on the southwestern edge of the San Joaquin Valley.
