= Bacon Glacier =

Glacier in Alaska, United States

- Location within Alaska
- Interactive map of Bacon Glacier
- Type: Mountain glacier
- Location: Juneau City and Borough, Alaska, United States
- Coordinates: 58°38′59″N 133°48′29″W

Bacon Glacier is a glacier in Juneau City and Borough, Alaska, US, close to the Canada–United States border. It drains into Bacon Creek. The glacier has an elevation of 2,611 feet (796 m), and is located at 58.650°N 133.808°W. Like many other place names in Alaska, Bacon Glacier also reflects the importance of food to the early prospectors and miners who came up with many of those names.
