= Bacon Lake =

- Location within Vancouver Island
- Location: Vancouver Island, British Columbia
- Coordinates: 49°58′00″N 125°38′00″W
- Lake type: Natural lake
- Basin countries: Canada

Bacon Lake is a lake located in British Columbia, Canada, located north of Upper Campbell Lake. The name is thought to be for H.N. Bacon, who was "guide for the province's exploratory survey of Strathcona Park".

== See also ==
- List of lakes of British Columbia
