= Talo (food) =

Unleavened maize flatbread from Basque Country

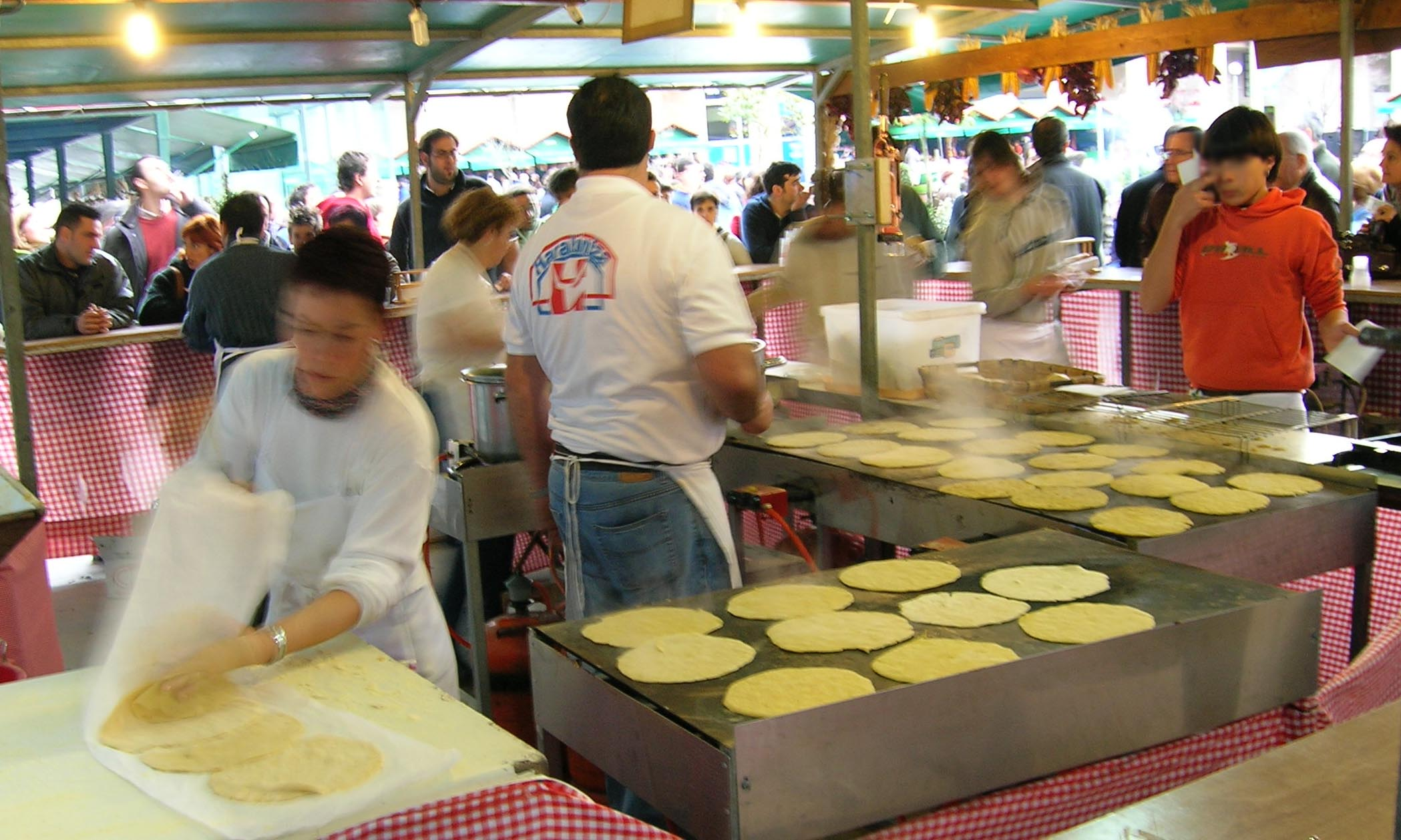
- Making talo in Leioa, Biscay
- Type: Bread
- Place of origin: France and Spain
- Region or state: Basque Country
- Main ingredients: Corn flour, water, salt

Talo or Talau (Basque pronunciation: [talo]), also known as pastetx or artopil in Soule, is a typical food of the Basque Country, similar to the traditional corn tortilla of Mesoamerica, made of corn flour, water and a bit of salt. It is round and is cooked in a warm metal plank, named a talo burni ("talo iron"). It can be eaten alone, with various toppings, and is also used as a wrap for various foods.

== History ==
After corn was introduced from America to Basque agriculture in 1520, talo was subsequently prepared. Talo was used as bread in Basque houses, and the remainings were sometimes mixed with milk making something similar to soup, which was eaten for dinner. In the 20th century the generalization of wheat bread reduced the consumption of talo, which started to only be eaten in special occasions. In Bilbao and San Sebastián it is an essential element at Saint Thomas' fair, celebrated annually on December 21. In the 1930s, workers would wrap foods within talo and take this to the fields. During the 1930s, miners also consumed talo, and it was also eaten by factory workers after this time.

Nowadays it is eaten with txistorra (a type of thin chorizo) while drinking txakoli. It is sometimes accompanied with milk, eaten with fried egg, fried pancetta (in Basque xingar, in French ventrèche) or fried Bayonne Ham, cheese like Ossau-Iraty, chocolate or honey. In Bayonne, France, street vendors purvey talo during its annual Bayonne Ham Fair.

== See also ==
- List of maize dishes
