= Yakassé-Attobrou Department =

Coordinates: 6°11′N 3°39′W

Yakassé-Attobrou Department Département de Yakassé-Attobrou
- Department
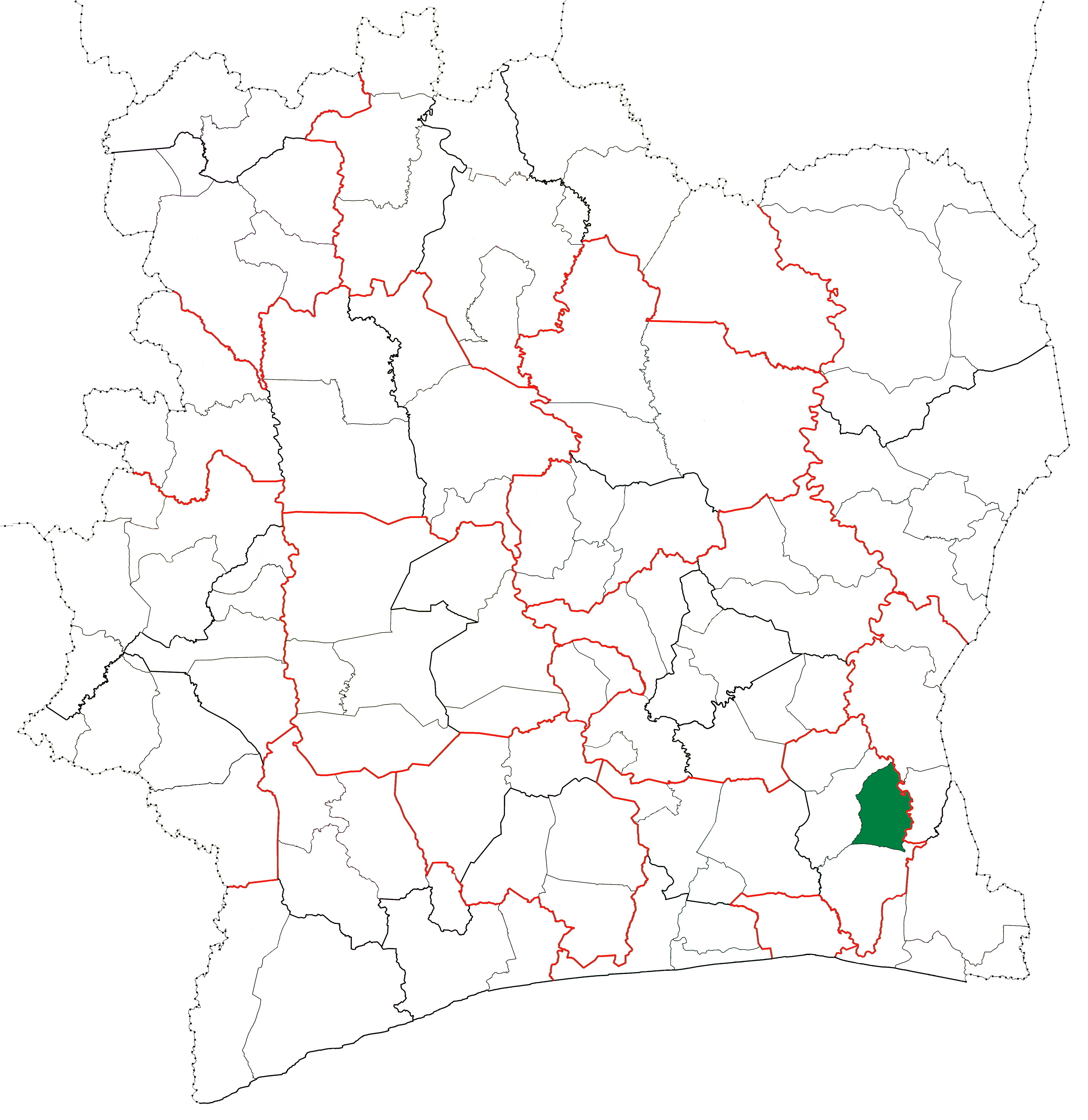
- Location in Ivory Coast. Yakassé-Attobrou Department has retained the same boundaries since its creation in 2008.
- Country: Ivory Coast
- District: Lagunes
- Region: La Mé
- 2008: Established as a second-level subdivision via a division of Adzopé Dept
- 2011: Converted to a third-level subdivision
- Departmental seat: Yakassé-Attobrou

Government
  - Prefect: Gbaza Samuel Seri

Area
  - Total: 1,450 km^{2} (560 sq mi)

Population (2021 census)
  - Total: 105,986
  - Density: 73.1/km^{2} (189/sq mi)
- Time zone: UTC+0 (GMT)

Yakassé-Attobrou Department is a department of La Mé Region in Lagunes District, Ivory Coast. In 2021, its population was 105,986 and its seat is the settlement of Yakassé-Attobrou. The sub-prefectures of the department are Abongoua, Biéby, and Yakassé-Attobrou.

== History ==
Yakassé-Attobrou Department was created in 2008 as a second-level division via a split-off from Adzopé Department. At its creation, it was part of Agnéby Region.

In 2011, districts were introduced as new first-level subdivisions of Ivory Coast. At the same time, regions were reorganised and became second-level subdivisions and all departments were converted into third-level subdivisions. At this time, Yakassé-Attobrou Department became part of La Mé Region in Lagunes District.
