= Akoupé Department =

Coordinates: 6°23′N 3°54′W

Akoupé Department Département d'Akoupé
- Department
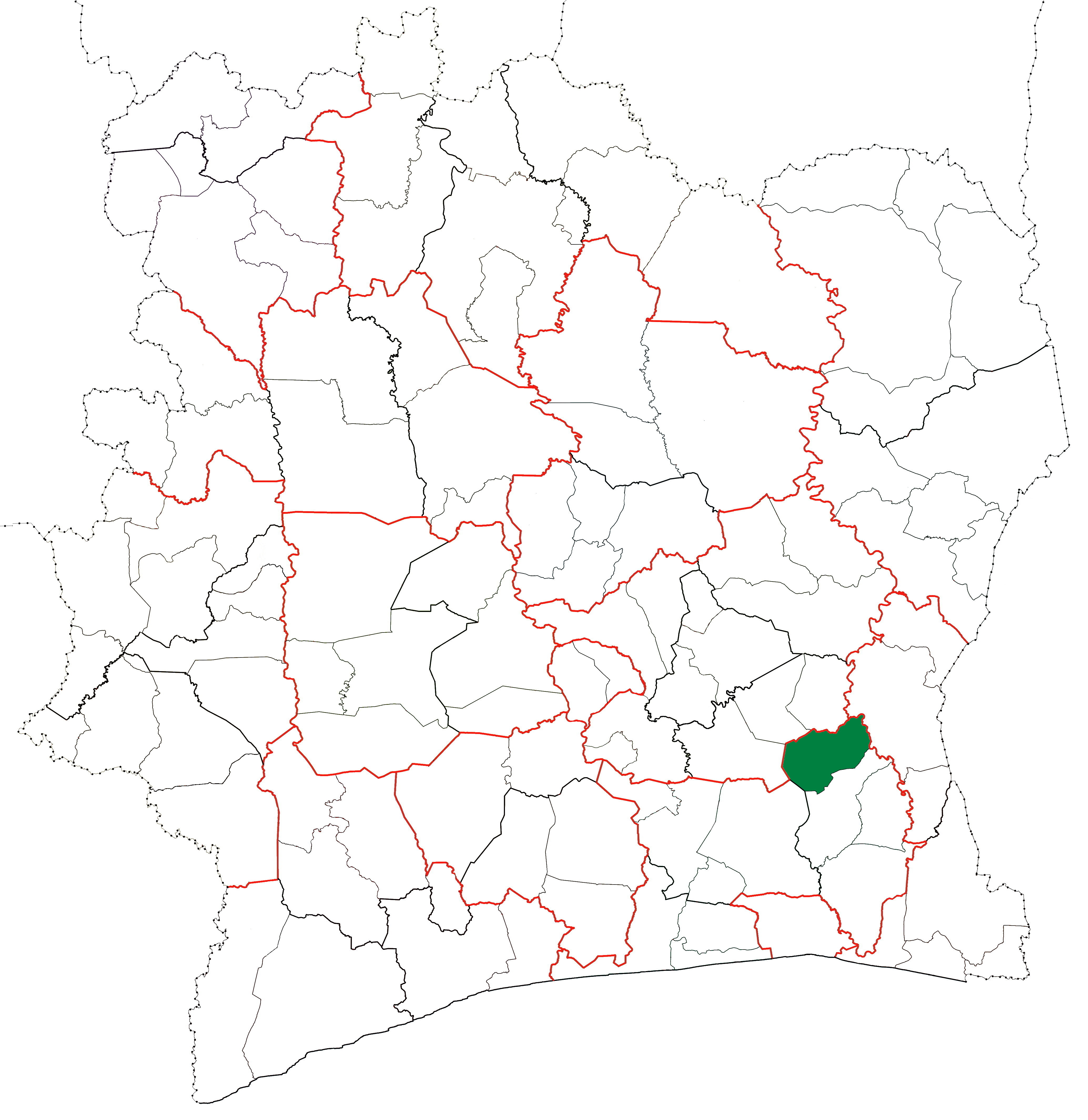
- Location in Ivory Coast. Akoupé Department has retained the same boundaries since its creation in 2005.
- Country: Ivory Coast
- District: Lagunes
- Region: La Mé
- 2005: Established as a second-level subdivision via a division of Adzopé Dept
- 2011: Converted to a third-level subdivision
- Departmental seat: Akoupé

Government
  - Prefect: Mel Djédj

Area
  - Total: 1,680 km^{2} (650 sq mi)

Population (2021 census)
  - Total: 156,698
  - Density: 93.3/km^{2} (242/sq mi)
- Time zone: UTC+0 (GMT)

Akoupé Department is a department of La Mé Region in Lagunes District, Ivory Coast. In 2021, its population was 156,698 and its seat is the settlement of Akoupé. The sub-prefectures of the department are Afféry, Akoupé, and Bécouéfin.

== History ==
Akoupé Department was created in 2005 as a second-level subdivision via a split-off from Adzopé Department. At its creation, it was part of Agnéby Region.

In 2011, districts were introduced as new first-level subdivisions of Ivory Coast. At the same time, regions were reorganised and became second-level subdivisions and all departments were converted into third-level subdivisions. At this time, Akoupé Department became part of La Mé Region in Lagunes District.
