= Sikensi Department =

Coordinates: 5°40′N 4°34′W

Sikensi Department Département de Sikensi
- Department
- Location in Ivory Coast. Sikensi Department has retained the same boundaries since its creation in 2005.
- Country: Ivory Coast
- Region: Agnéby-Tiassa
- 2005: Established as a second-level subdivision via a division of Dabou Dept
- 2011: Converted to a third-level subdivision
- Departmental seat: Sikensi

Government
  - Prefect: Yéo Oumar

Area
  - Total: 762 km^{2} (294 sq mi)

Population (2021 census)
  - Total: 125,897
  - Density: 165/km^{2} (428/sq mi)
- Time zone: UTC+0 (GMT)

Sikensi Department is a department of Agnéby-Tiassa Region in Lagunes District, Ivory Coast. In 2021, its population was 125,897 and its seat is the settlement of Sikensi. The sub-prefectures of the department are Gomon and Sikensi.

== History ==
Sikensi Department was created in 2005 as a second-level subdivision via a split-off from Dabou Department. At its creation, it was part of Lagunes Region.

In 2011, districts were introduced as new first-level subdivisions of Ivory Coast. At the same time, regions were reorganised and became second-level subdivisions and all departments were converted into third-level subdivisions. At this time, Sikensi Department became part of Agnéby-Tiassa Region in Lagunes District.
