= Adzopé =

- Town, sub-prefecture, and commune
- Location in Ivory Coast
- Coordinates: 6°10′N 3°59′W
- Country: Ivory Coast
- District: Lagunes
- Region: La Mé
- Department: Adzopé

Area
  - Total: 1,020 km^{2} (390 sq mi)

Population (2021 census)
  - Total: 156,488
  - Density: 153/km^{2} (397/sq mi)
  - Town: 58,722
- (2014 census)
- Time zone: UTC+0 (GMT)

Adzopé is a town in south-eastern Ivory Coast. It is a sub-prefecture of and the seat of Adzopé Department. It is also a commune and the seat of La Mé Region in Lagunes District. In the 2021 census, the sub-prefecture of Adzopé had a population of 156,488.

== Notable people ==
- Hervé Guy, French-Ivorian footballer
- Igor Lolo, Ivorian footballer
