= Alépé Department =

Coordinates: 5°30′N 3°40′W

Alépé Department Département d'Alépé
- Department
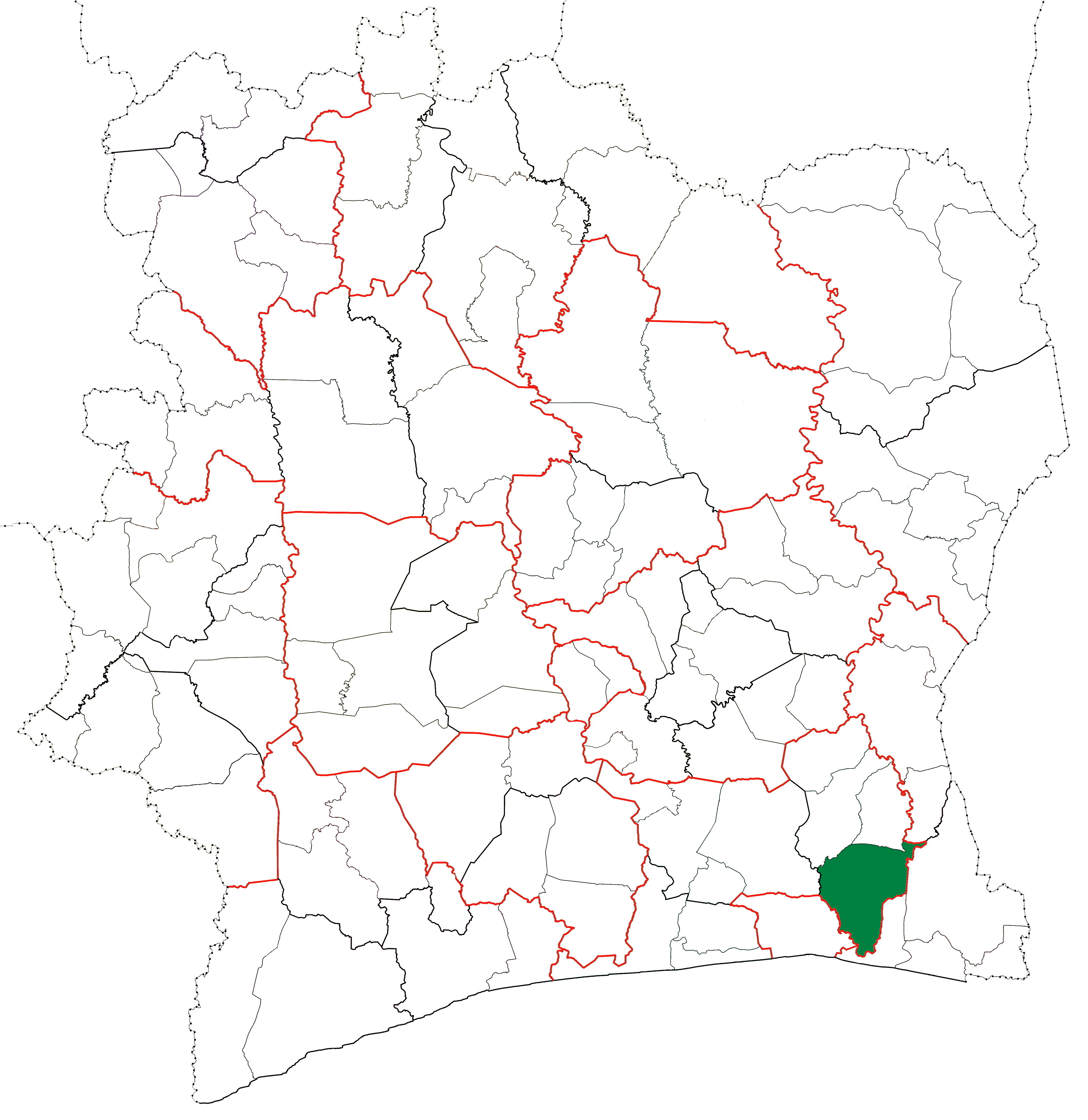
- Location in Ivory Coast. Alépé Department has retained the same boundaries since its creation in 1998.
- Country: Ivory Coast
- District: Lagunes
- Region: La Mé
- 1998: Established as a second-level subdivision via a division of Abidjan Dept
- 2011: Converted to a third-level subdivision
- Departmental seat: Alépé

Government
  - Prefect: Diane Bassinima

Area
  - Total: 2,700 km^{2} (1,000 sq mi)

Population (2021 census)
  - Total: 180,253
  - Density: 67/km^{2} (170/sq mi)
- Time zone: UTC+0 (GMT)

Alépé Department is a department of La Mé Region in Lagunes District, Ivory Coast. In 2021, its population was 180,253 and its seat is the settlement of Alépé. The sub-prefectures of the department are Aboisso-Comoé, Alépé, Allosso, Danguira, and Oghlwapo.

== History ==
Alépé Department was created in 1998 as a second-level subdivision via a split-off from Abidjan Department. At its creation, it was part of Lagunes Region.

In 2011, districts were introduced as new first-level subdivisions of Ivory Coast. At the same time, regions were reorganised and became second-level subdivisions and all departments were converted into third-level subdivisions. At this time, Alépé Department became part of La Mé Region in Lagunes District.
