= Adzopé Department =

Coordinates: 6°10′N 3°59′W

Adzopé Department Département d'Adzopé
- Department
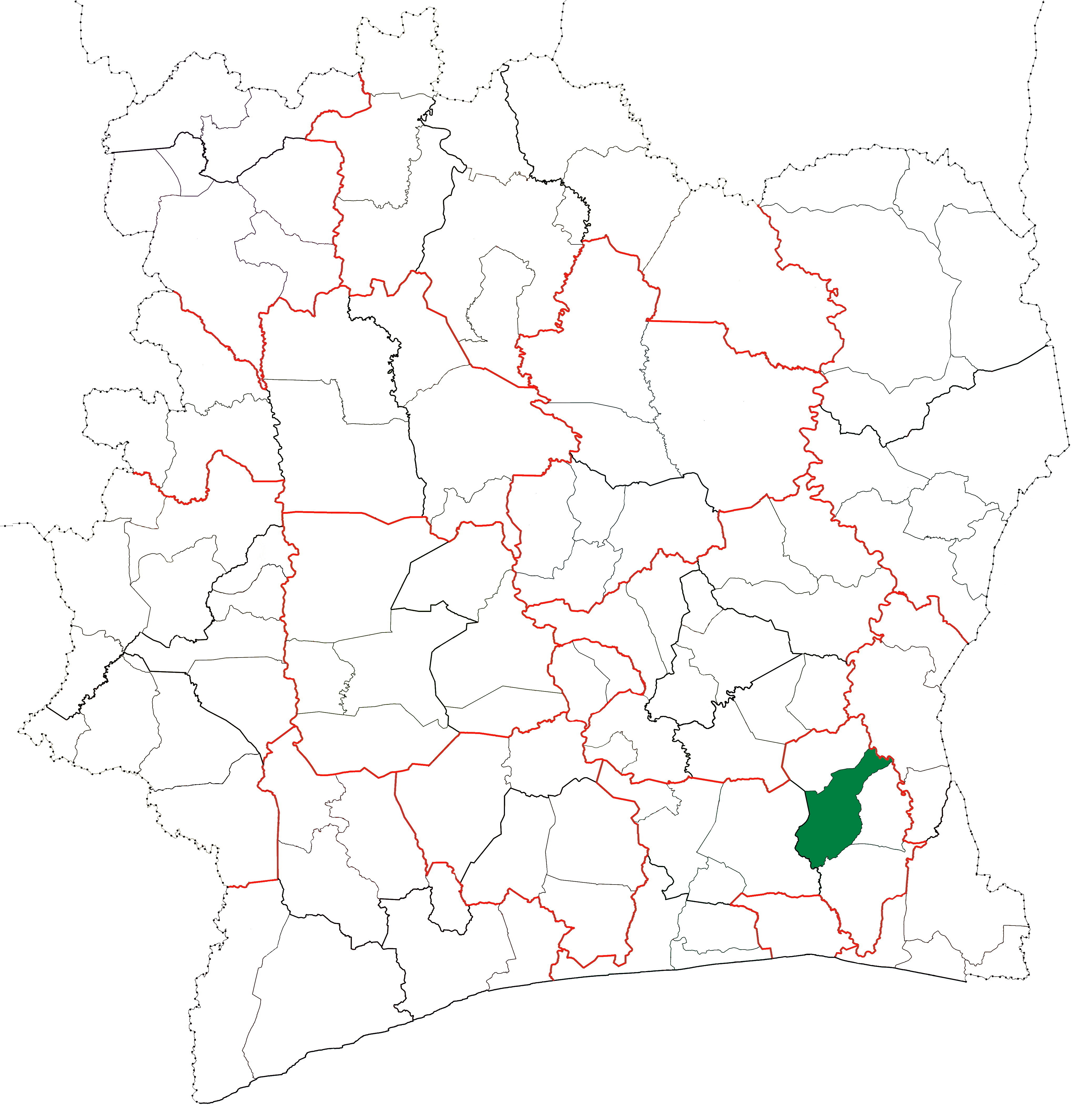
- Location in Ivory Coast. Adzopé Department has had these boundaries since 2008.
- Country: Ivory Coast
- District: Lagunes
- Region: La Mé
- 1969: Established as a first-level subdivision
- 1997: Converted to a second-level subdivision
- 2005: Divided to create Akoupé Dept
- 2008: Divided to create Yakassé-Attobrou Dept
- 2011: Converted to a third-level subdivision
- Departmental seat: Adzopé

Area
  - Total: 2,050 km^{2} (790 sq mi)

Population (2021 census)
  - Total: 283,727
  - Density: 138/km^{2} (358/sq mi)
- Time zone: UTC+0 (GMT)

Adzopé Department is a department of La Mé Region in Lagunes District, Ivory Coast. In 2021, its population was 283,727 and its seat is the settlement of Adzopé. The sub-prefectures of the department are Adzopé, Agou, Annépé, Assikoi, Bécédi-Brignan, and Yakassé-Mé.

== History ==
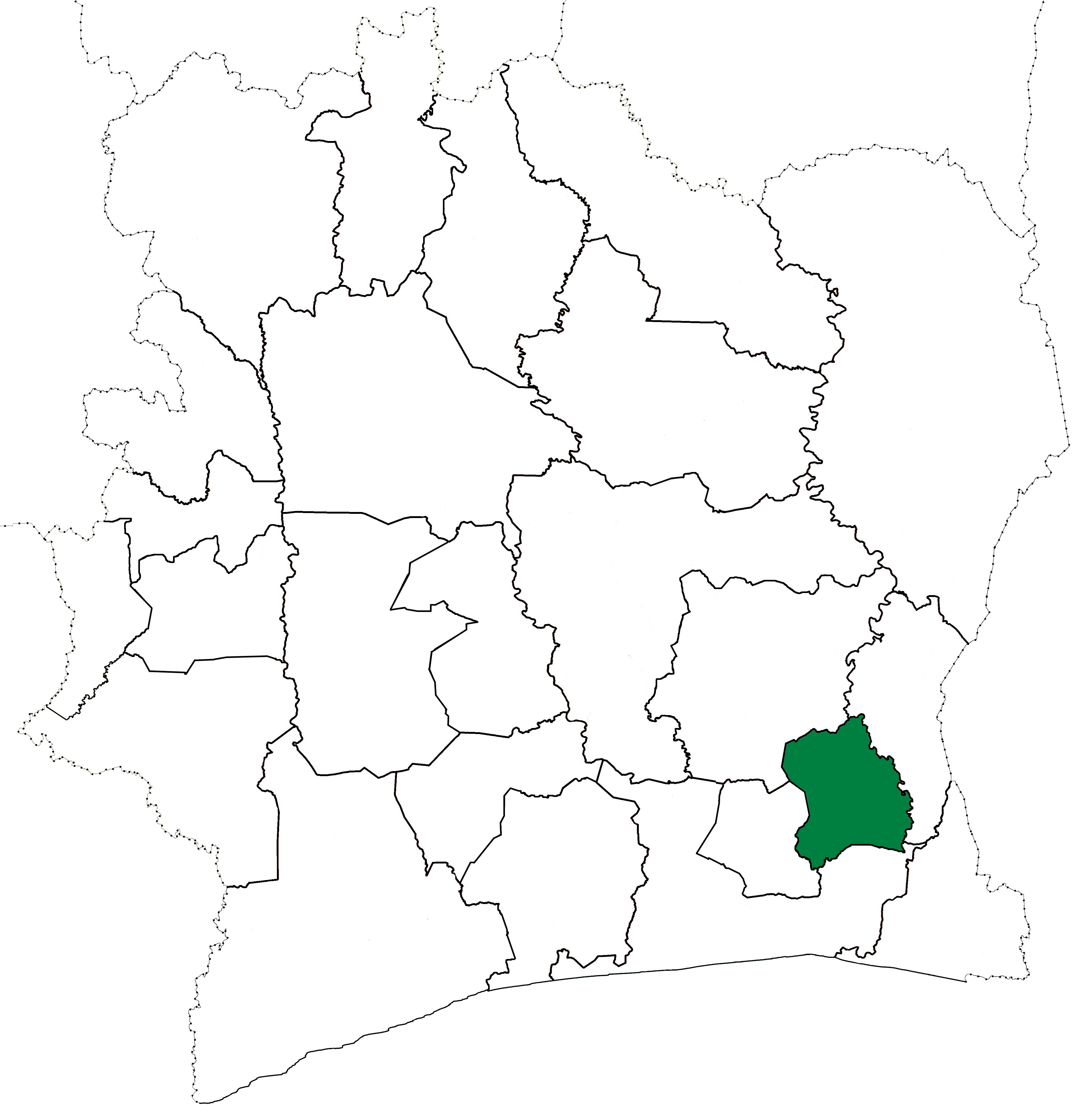
Adzopé Department upon its creation in 1969. It kept these boundaries until 2005, but other departments began to be divided in 1974.

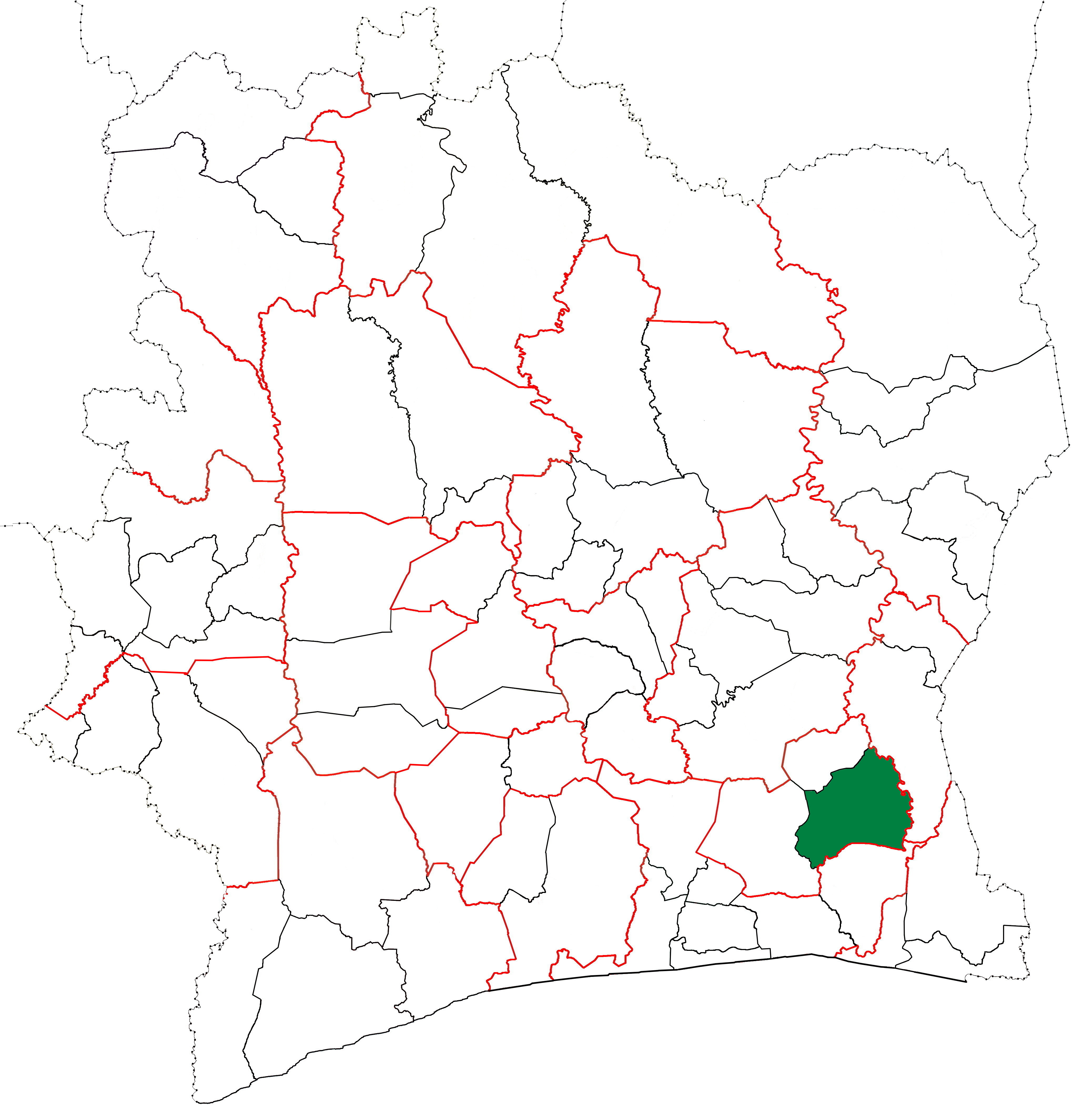
Adzopé Department from 2005 to 2008.

Adzopé Department was created in 1969 as one of the 24 new departments that were created to take the place of the six departments that were being abolished. It was created from territory that was formerly part of Sud Department. Using current boundaries as a reference, the department occupied all of what is today La Mé Region, with the exception of Alépé Department.

In 1997, regions were introduced as new first-level subdivisions of Ivory Coast; as a result, all departments were converted into second-level subdivisions. Adzopé Department was combined with Agboville Department to form Agnéby Region.

In 2005, Adzopé Department was divided in order to create Akoupé Department. What remained of Adzopé Department was divided again in 2008 with the split-off creation of Yakassé-Attobrou Department.

In 2011, districts were introduced as new first-level subdivisions of Ivory Coast. At the same time, regions were reorganised and became second-level subdivisions and all departments were converted into third-level subdivisions. At this time, Adzopé Department became part of La Mé Region in Lagunes District.
