= La Mé =

Coordinates: 6°10′N 3°59′W

La Mé Region Région de la Mé Massan Region Région du Massan
- Region
- Seal
- Motto: "Nous vous accompagnons"
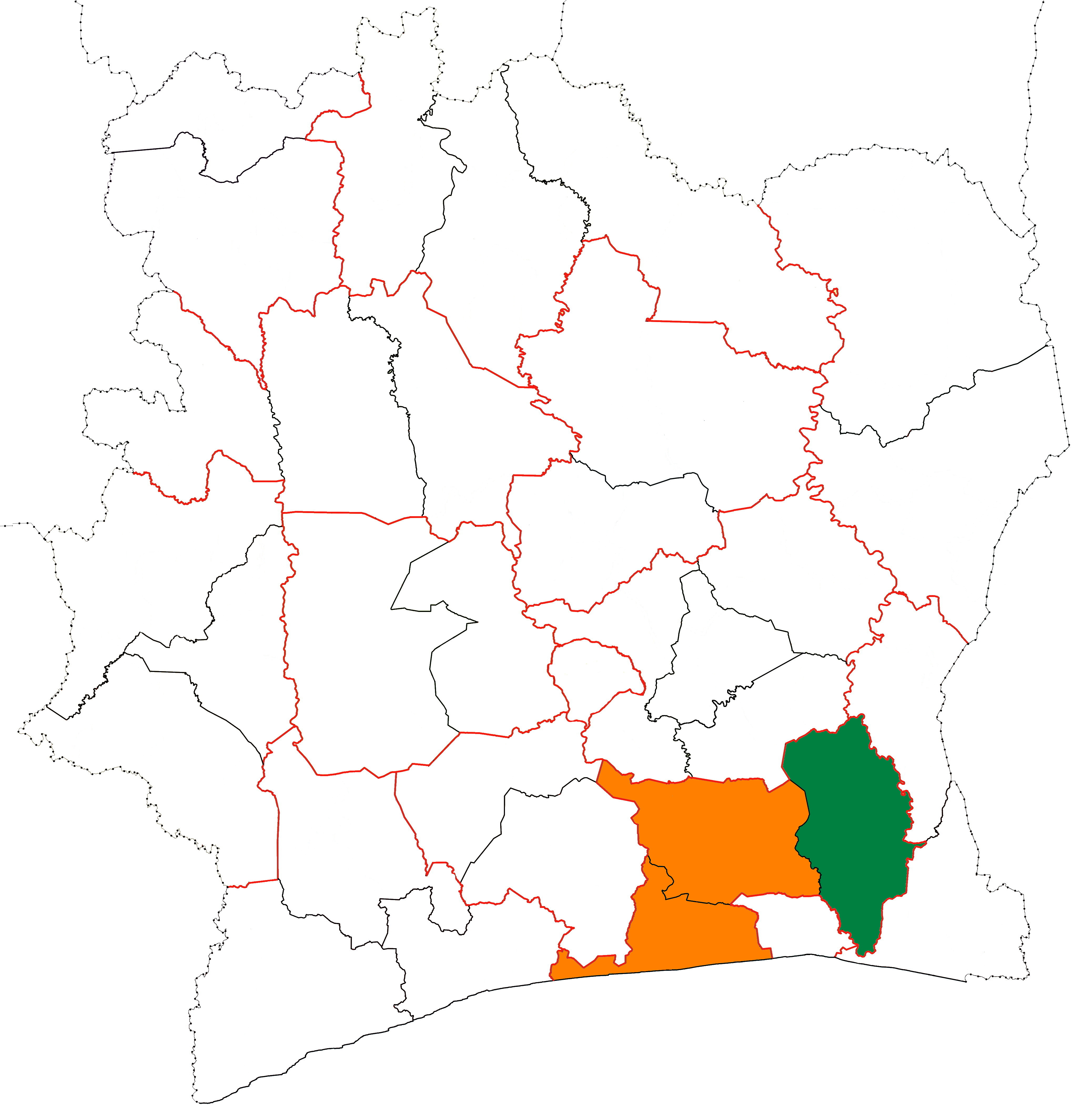
- Location of La Mé Region (green) in Ivory Coast and in Lagunes District
- Country: Ivory Coast
- District: Lagunes
- 2011: Established
- Regional seat: Adzopé

Government
  - Prefect: Sanogo Al-Hassana
  - Council President: Yapi Jean-Claude Sombo

Area
  - Total: 7,880 km^{2} (3,040 sq mi)

Population (2021 census)
  - Total: 726,665
  - Density: 92.2/km^{2} (239/sq mi)
- Time zone: UTC+0 (GMT)
- Website: regiondelame.net

La Mé Region (also known as Massan Region) is one of the 31 regions of Ivory Coast. Since its establishment in 2011, it has been one of three regions in Lagunes District. The seat of the region is Adzopé and the region's population in the 2021 census was 726,665.

La Mé is currently divided into four departments: Adzopé, Akoupé, Alépé, and Yakassé-Attobrou.

== Name ==
In the 2011 decree that created the region, La Mé was referred to exclusively as the region of "Massan". Since its creation, the region has more commonly been referred to as "La Mé".
