= Lagunes District =

District of Ivory Coast

Coordinates: 5°56′N 4°13′W

Lagunes District District des Lagunes
- District
- Country: Ivory Coast
- Established: 2011
- Capital: Dabou

Area
  - Total: 20,450 km^{2} (7,900 sq mi)

Population (2021)
  - Total: 2,042,623
  - Density: 99.88/km^{2} (258.7/sq mi)
- HDI (2022): 0.566 medium · 4th of 14

Lagunes District (French: District des Lagunes, pronounced [distʁikt de laɡyn], lit. 'Lagoons') is one of fourteen administrative districts of Ivory Coast. The district is located in the southern part of the country. The capital of the district is Dabou.

== Creation ==
Lagunes District was created in a 2011 administrative reorganisation of the subdivisions of Ivory Coast. The territory of the district was composed by merging the former regions of Agnéby and Lagunes and removing the territory of the Abidjan Autonomous District.

== Administrative divisions ==
Lagunes District is currently subdivided into three regions and the following departments:

- Agnéby-Tiassa Region (region seat in Agboville)
  - Agboville Department
  - Sikensi Department
  - Tiassalé Department
  - Taabo Department
- Grands-Ponts Region (region seat also in Dabou)
  - Dabou Department
  - Grand-Lahou Department
  - Jacqueville Department
- La Mé Region (region seat in Adzopé)
  - Adzopé Department
  - Akoupé Department
  - Alépé Department
  - Yakassé-Attobrou Department

== Population ==
According to the 2021 census, Lagunes District has a population of 2,042,623.

=== Religion ===
Religion in Lagunes (2021 census)
Religion	Percent
Christianity	53.2%
Islam	25.1%
None	16.4%
Traditional	0.7%
Other	4.6%

According to the 2021 census, Christianity is the majority religion in Lagunes, practised by 53.2% of the total population. Adherents of Islam represent 25.1% of the population, followed by those with no religion at 16.4%. A smaller share of residents follow traditional religions or other faiths.
