= Abbé people =

Ethnic group, primarily in Ivory Coast

Abbé
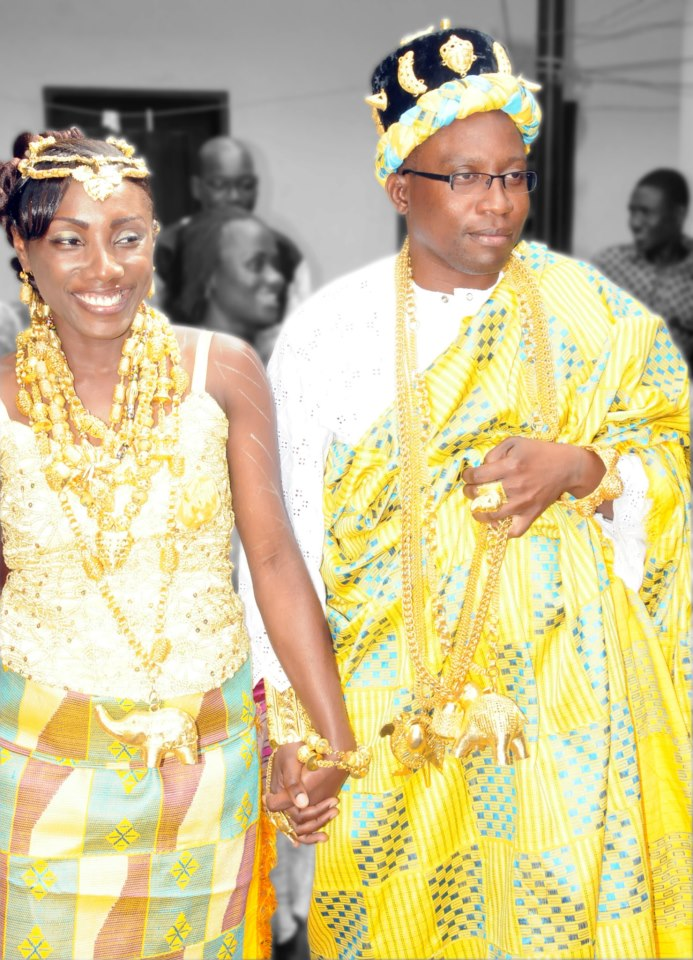
- Outfits worn during a traditional wedding

Total population
- ~580,000

Regions with significant populations
- Ivory Coast

Languages
- Abé language, French

Related ethnic groups
- Other Atlantic–Congo-speaking peoples Especially other Akan peoples and Adjoukrou

The Abbé (or Abbey or Abbay), are an Akan people who live predominantly in the Ivory Coast, and number 580,000. Abbés speak the Akan dialect Abé.

Abbés populations or Abbeys (or Béssouffouè in the Central Tano language Baoulé) were the warriors of the left wing of the army of Queen Pokou. The Abbés are an Akan people originating in Ghana, from where they migrated to Ivory Coast in the 17th and 18th centuries.

Abbés live mainly in the Ivorian region of Agboville, 79 km north of Abidjan.

== History of settlement ==
According to legend, the Abbés are descendants of the Anyi.

It was during the reign of Akoussou that the Abbés, threatened by their neighbors, the Ashanti, decided to leave for peaceful lands. Their exodus in the 18th century was led by Patchibo, the son of Akossou and Nana Yah Abobia. The Abbés cross the Tanoé and the Comoé and stopped between Adzopé and Agboville, where Patchibo created the village of Douda, now called Grand Morié.

Continuing on their way, Patchibo settled his people about fifteen kilometers from the Agnéby and founded the village of Allahin, now known as the Loviguié. From Douda and Allahin, and the Abbés pushed back the Attiés, their eastern neighbors. This is why there are Abbé villages in the Ivory Coast sub-prefecture of Bingerville. They also spread to the west side of the river Bandama, resulting in more than eight Abbé villages in the sub-prefecture Tiassalé. The story goes that other Abbés left the village of Douda and had settled beyond Tiassalé to form the Didas in the center-west of Ivory Coast. This subgroup Didas made an undeniable, irremovable and immortal covenant, which is called toukpè and which means covenant of peace. This would explain the memory of that ethnic separation.

=== The revolt of 1910 ===
During the colonial era, a revolt of the Abbé in January 1910 (early 1905, late 1918), led to the deportation from Ivory Coast of several citizens of ethnic groups from Central African Republic and Congo - Brazzaville. The Abbés, tired of the excesses committed by settlers in the Ivorian port, forced labor, confiscation of weapons immediately after the payment of heavy taxes required for their transport, arbitrary acts, and other grievances, the Abbés revolted. They rampaged with 1,400 skirmishers from Senegal, and decapitated a French commander named Rubino in the process.
Three notable descendants of the deportees were:

- The Heads of State: Jean-Bédel Bokassa, Denis Sassou Nguesso and Ange-Félix Patassé, all from Grand-Morié.
- Geostrategic consequences: rescue, assistance, brotherhood by direct blood link between these sister countries of Central Africa, Congo Brazzaville and Ivory Coast.

== Language and location ==
The Abbés speak the Akan language dialect Abbé, and are an Akan subgroup. The Abbés are reflected in the Ivorian prefectural departments Agboville, Azaguié, Rubino, Grand Morié, Loviguié, Guessiguié, Ottopé, Offoumpo, Grand-Yapo, Attobrou, Blida etc., then around Abidjan in the sub-prefecture N’douci, Tiassalé, Sikensi, Bingerville, Lakota, Divo, and around M'bahiakro, Ouellé, Ananda Koidiokro etc. The Abbés cantons in Ivory Coast are the canton Tchoffo, and the canton Morié.

== See also ==
- Agboville
- Jean-Bédel Bokassa
- Jean-Bédel Bokassa
- Jean-Bédel Bokassa

== Bibliography ==
- (in English) James Stuart Olson, « Abé », in The Peoples of Africa: An Ethnohistorical Dictionary, Greenwood Publishing Group, 1996, p. 3-4
- (in French) Guy Cangah and Simon-Pierre Ekanza, « Rise of the Abbey » in Ivory Coast texts: The dawn of colonization to the present day, African News Publishing, Abdidjan, 1978, p. 105-106
- (in French) Jean-Louis Chaléard, Agrarian structures and plantation economy in Abé: Department d'Agboville – Ivory Coast, University of Paris-Nanterre, 1979, 529 p. (thesis of cycle)
- (in French) Gérard Dumestre and Laurent Duponchel, Proverbs Ivory Coast : fascicle 1: Proverbs abé and Avikam, University of Abidjan, Institut of linguistics applied, Abidjan, 1972, 122 p.
