= Abidjan–Ouagadougou railway =

Single-track narrow gauge railway line in Côte d'Ivoire and Burkina Faso

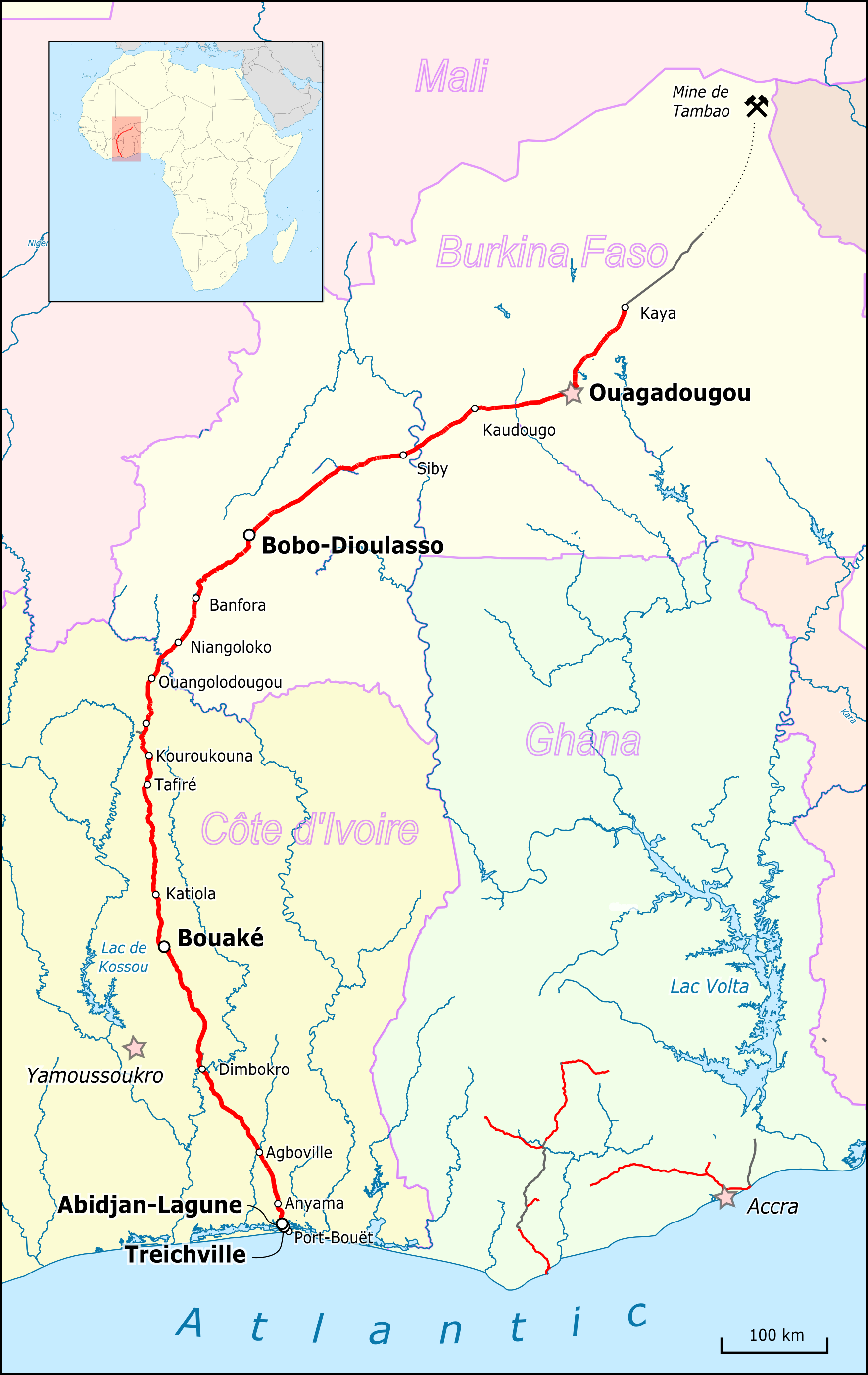
Abidjan–Ouagadougou Railway

The Abidjan-Niger Railway is a 1,260-kilometre (780-mile) single-track metre gauge line in francophone West Africa that links Abidjan, the economic capital of Ivory Coast to Ouagadougou, the capital of Burkina Faso. The railway, like others on the continent, was constructed by the colonial power to encourage economic development in the region, although detractors would claim that it was to exploit the region solely for their own advantage.

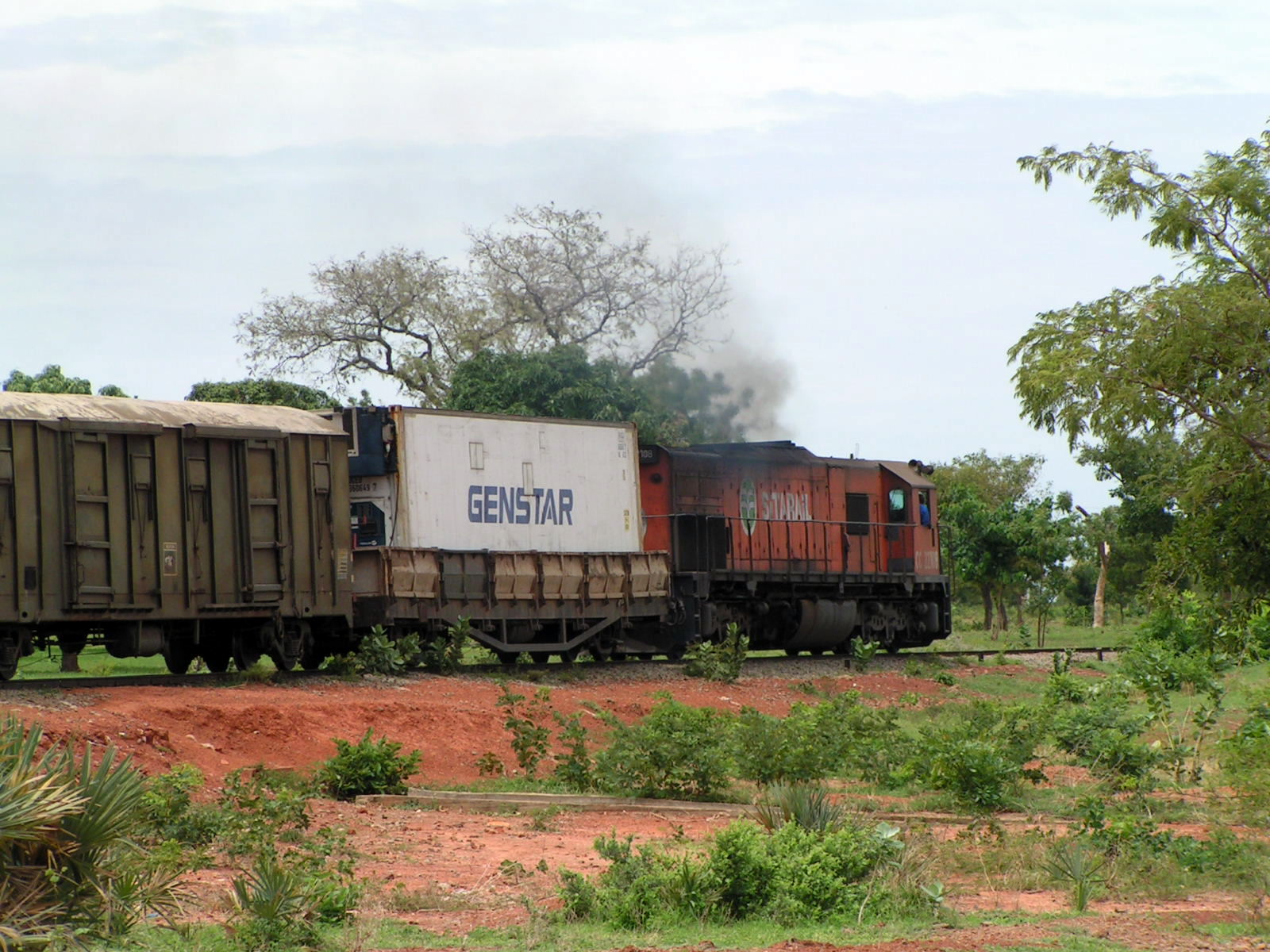
A Sitarail train

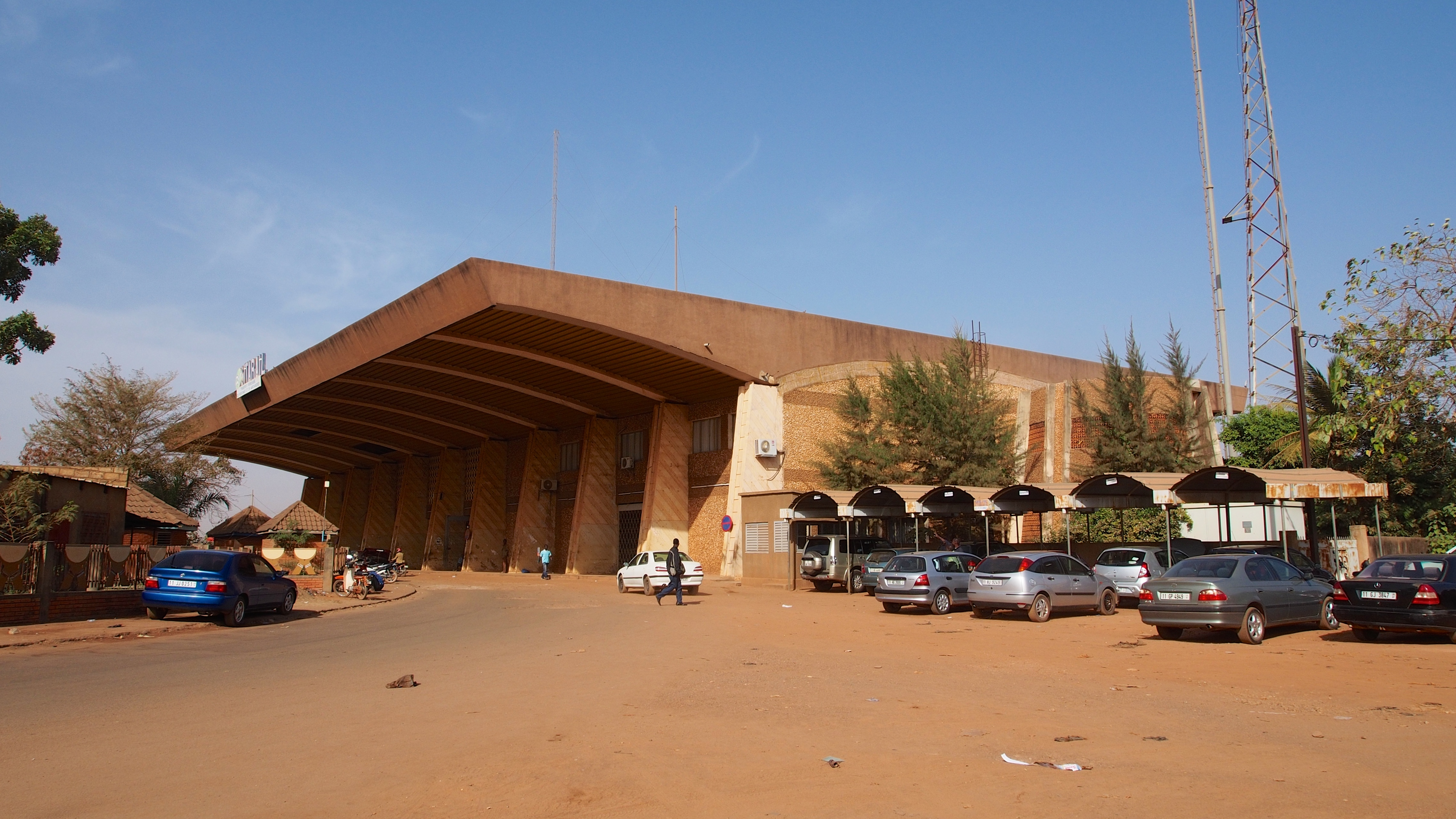
Ouagadougou Station in 2013

Although the railway was once the predominant transporter of passengers in the region, by 2000 it was facing strong competition from road transport. Now, the railway's main role is servicing international freight traffic (petroleum products, containers, fertilizers, grain, clinker, cement, cotton etc.) to and from Burkina Faso and the north of Côte d'Ivoire.

As of 2024, there is no passenger traffic anymore.

== Communities served ==
A passenger train still runs three times a week, on Tuesdays, Thursdays and Saturdays. The journey has been reported to take from 36 to 48 hours. The passenger train serves the following stations:

=== Côte d'Ivoire ===
- Treichville station
- Abidjan-Lagune station, which was the terminus until the construction of the Houphouët-Boigny Bridge.
- Plateau station which closed in 1930.
- Abobo station, also known as Gare Nord or Le Banco, is the original terminus
- Adjamé station
- Anyama station
- Azaguié station, 41 km from the terminus.
- Grand Yapo.
- Agboville station, 82 km from the terminus.
- Rubino station, 101 km from the terminus.
- Céchi station, 125 km from the terminus.
- Anoumaba station, 140 km from the terminus.
- Tiémélékro station, 162 km from the terminus.
- Dimbokro station, 183 km from the terminus. Inaugurated on 11 September 1910 along with the Viaduc du N'Zi (255 m).
- Nofou station
- N'do Kouassikro station
- Boli station
- Raviart station
- Kan station
- Bouaké station
- Ferkessédougou station

=== Burkina Faso ===
- Niangoloko station, at the Burkina Faso border
- Banfora station
- Bobo-Dioulasso station
- Zamo station
- Ouagadougou station, inaugurated in 1945.

== Construction ==
Numerous proposals for establishing railways in the colony of Côte d'Ivoire were made in the 19th century by the French army officers Jean-Baptiste Marchand and Charles Houdaille. In 1889, the colonial authorities undertook a geographic and ethnographic survey, called la mission Houdaille, to establish whether it would be feasible for a railway to penetrate the interior. This led to Abidjan being chosen as the starting point for a line heading north to the “Baoulé country” in 1903.

Building began in 1904 under the direction of Captain Crosson-Duplessis. The railway reached its first stations, Agboville and Dimbokro, in 1907 and 1908 respectively. In 1909, the Abé people revolted against the colony's practice of conscripting forced labour, a common practice throughout French West Africa at that time. The railway reached Bouaké in 1912, 315 kilometers north of Abidjan but construction was then suspended because of World War I.

Work resumed in 1920, with the new project to extend the line into the new colony of Upper Volta (present Burkina Faso). Katiola was reached in 1924, Ferkessedougou in 1929 and Bobo-Dioulasso in 1934. Work was then halted in the north to resume work on the southern section from Abidjan to Agboville, but was suspended again by World War II. The line finally reached Ouagadougou in 1954.

An extension to Kaya was completed in 1985, to eventually reach the manganese deposits in Tambao in the extreme north.

To a certain extent, the new railway helped to develop the region, with towns along the line becoming new administrative and economic centres. In the early twentieth century, the road network was very limited even in the south, so all local produce - for example kola, palm oil, leather, maize and cotton - was channeled through the railway stations. However, local hubs such as Abgoville and Dimbokro declined in 1950s as road networks improved.

== Recent history ==
=== State ownership ===
Following independence in 1960, the Abidjan–Ouagadougou railway was managed and operated by the Régie des chemins de fer Abidjan-Niger (RAN), a public enterprise jointly owned by Côte d'Ivoire and Upper Volta. RAN, which was financially viable until the mid-1970s, prioritised public transport, with 2.6 million passengers in 1967, 4 million in 1978 and 3.8 million in 1979. This policy allowed local people to engage in commercial activities over a far wider area for the first time.

However, from the mid-1970s, operational and financial performance declined because of inadequate funding, bad management and increasing road competition. By the 1980s, RAN was facing critical financial difficulties, and in 1989 it split into two separate state-owned companies, the Société Ivoirienne des Chemins de Fer (SICF) and the Société des Chemins de Fer du Burkina (SCFB). This separation only exacerbated the inefficiencies and led to an even greater shift to road transport.

=== Privatization ===
Faced with this crisis, and under pressure from the IMF and the World Bank, the two governments handed over the management of the entire line to the "Sitarail" consortium, an Ivorian private operator. Originally, the state-owned corporations, newly renamed the Société Ivoirienne de Patrimoine Ferroviaire (SIPF) and the Société de Gestion du Patrimoine Ferroviaire du Burkina (SOPAFERB) administered railway infrastructure while the state still owned the real estate. They also owned all rolling stock which they leased to Sitarail. These companies were eventually liquidated and Sitarail commenced its first year of operation in 1995. Sitirail rehired only 1815 staff out of a total workforce of 3470.

Sitarail is technically and financially responsible for (a) the operation of freight and passenger services; (b) the maintenance (and in part the renewal) of rail infrastructure (track, structures, buildings, signaling, and telecommunications equipment); and (c) the current management of the real estate. Sitarail placed a new emphasis on the transportation of merchandise, which increased in value from 22 to 27 million CFA francs between 2006 and 2009. Of the 66 original railway stations, only 8 were retained.

Traffic supervision is currently managed by the Bollore Group.

=== Current and future plans ===
Because of extensive track degradation and outdated rolling stock, the Ivorian and Burkinabe governments have drawn up various plans to renovate and improve the railway line:

In 2013, a plan to renovate the railway, with the aim of preserving and developing the rail transportation of goods and people between the two countries in satisfactory conditions of safety and comfort. The project involved renovating at least 50% of the rails at curves, and any weak tracks on straight sections; improving track maintenance efficiency; ensuring the continuous availability and safety of the track; and identifying the speed of trains.

In 2014, a plan was to extend the line from Ouagadougou to Tambao, a lucrative manganese mine in the far north east of Burkina Faso. The plan was made in conjunction with the French transportation company Bolloré and the international mining and engineering company Pan African Minerals

In 2017, a signed agreement to renovate the line.

The original plan to create a rail loop that would also encompass Niamey, Cotonou and Lomé has not yet materialised.
