= M'Brou =

Settlement of Ivory Coast

- Village
- Location in Ivory Coast
- Coordinates: 6°1′N 4°9′W
- Country: Ivory Coast
- District: Lagunes
- Region: Agnéby-Tiassa
- Department: Agboville
- Sub-prefecture: Grand-Morié
- Time zone: UTC+0 (GMT)

M'Brou is a village in southern Ivory Coast. It is in the sub-prefecture of Grand-Morié, Agboville Department, Agnéby-Tiassa Region, Lagunes District.

M'Brou was a commune until March 2012, when it became one of 1,126 communes nationwide that were abolished.
