= Kondiébouma =

- Village
- Location in Ivory Coast
- Coordinates: 6°13′N 4°33′W
- Country: Ivory Coast
- District: Lagunes
- Region: Agnéby-Tiassa
- Department: Tiassalé
- Sub-prefecture: Morokro
- Time zone: UTC+0 (GMT)

Kondiébouma is a village in southern Ivory Coast. It is in the sub-prefecture of Morokro, Tiassalé Department, Agnéby-Tiassa Region, Lagunes District.

Kondiébouma was a commune until March 2012, when it became one of 1,126 communes nationwide that were abolished.
