= Broubrou =

- Village
- Location in Ivory Coast
- Coordinates: 5°43′N 4°49′W
- Country: Ivory Coast
- District: Lagunes
- Region: Agnéby-Tiassa
- Department: Tiassalé
- Sub-prefecture: Gbolouville
- Time zone: UTC+0 (GMT)

Broubrou is a village in southern Ivory Coast. It is in the sub-prefecture of Gbolouville, Tiassalé Department, Agnéby-Tiassa Region, Lagunes District.

Broubrou was a commune until March 2012, when it became one of 1,126 communes nationwide that were abolished.
