= Léléblé =

- Village
- Location in Ivory Coast
- Coordinates: 6°14′N 5°13′W
- Country: Ivory Coast
- District: Lagunes
- Region: Agnéby-Tiassa
- Department: Tiassalé
- Sub-prefecture: Taabo
- Time zone: UTC+0 (GMT)

Léléblé is a village in southern Ivory Coast. It is in the sub-prefecture of Taabo, Tiassalé Department, Agnéby-Tiassa Region, Lagunes District. The village is less than a kilometre east of the border with Gôh-Djiboua District.

Léléblé was a commune until March 2012, when it became one of 1,126 communes nationwide that were abolished.
