= Singrobo Hydroelectric Power Station =

Power station in Ivory Coast

Singrobo Dam
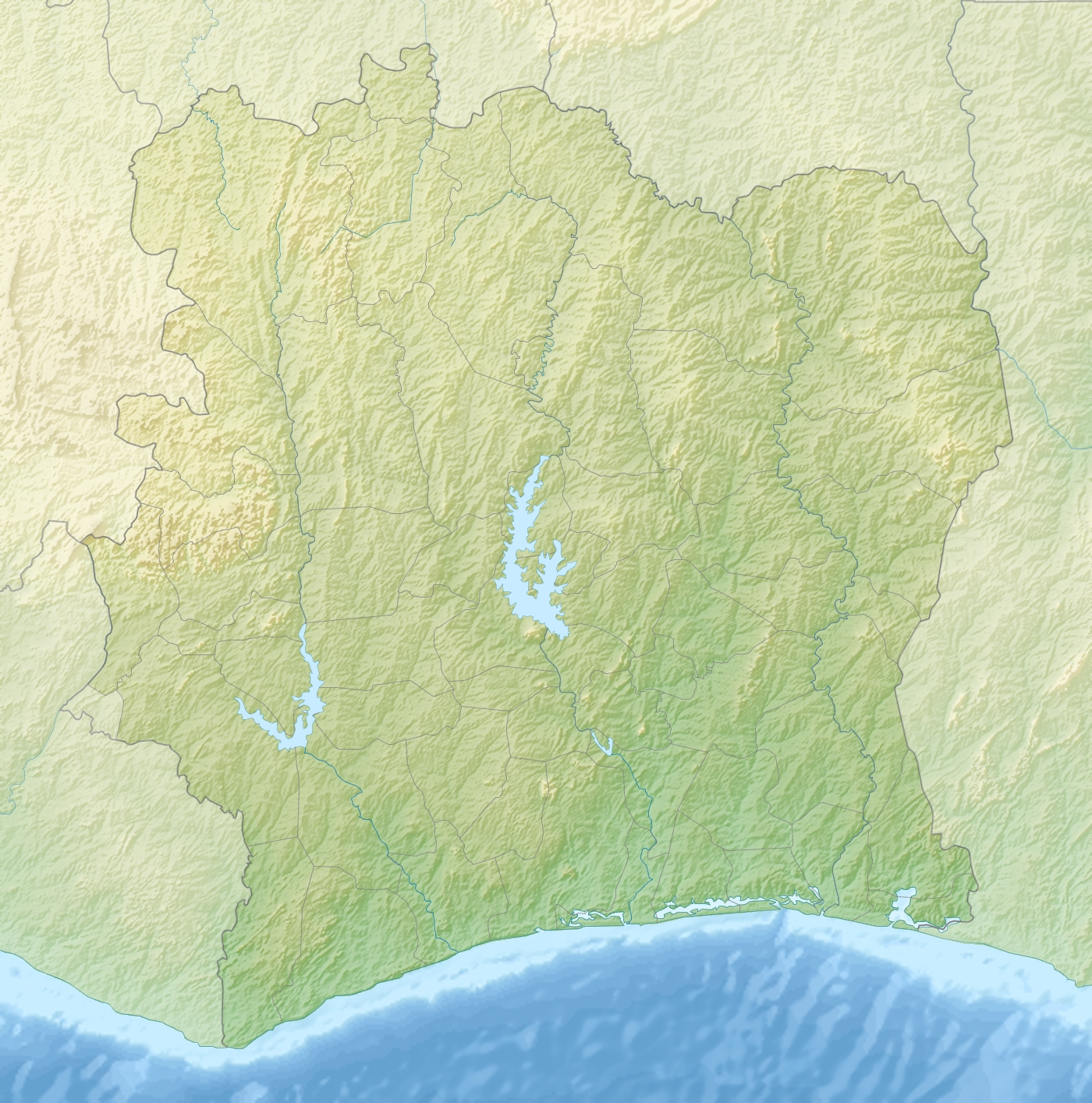
- Location of Singrobo Power Station; Placement on map is approximate Singrobo Dam (Africa) Singrobo Dam (Earth)
- Location: Singrobo and Ahouaty, Agnéby-Tiassa Region, Lagunes District, Ivory Coast
- Coordinates: 06°04′50″N 04°56′26″W
- Construction began: 2020
- Opening date: 2023 Expected
- Construction cost: €195 million (US$214 million)

Dam and spillways
- Type of dam: Gravity dam
- Impounds: Bandama River
- Height: 23.5 metres (77 ft)
- Length: 1,374 metres (4,508 ft)
- Dam volume: 105,000,000 cubic metres (3.708040006×10^{9} cu ft)

Power Station
- Commission date: 2023 Expected
- Turbines: 4
- Installed capacity: 44 MW
- Annual generation: 217 GW·h

The Singrobo Hydroelectric Power Station, also Singrobo-Ahouaty Hydroelectric Power Project, is a hydroelectric power station under construction across the Bandama River, in Ivory Coast. When completed, as expected in 2023, the power station will be the first, grid-ready hydroelectric power station, developed and owned by an independent power producer (IPP) in West Africa. The energy generated here will be sold to the Ivorian electric utility company, Cienergues, under a 35-year power purchase agreement (PPA).

== Location ==
The power station is located in the villages of Singrobo and Ahouaty, in Tiassalé Department, Agnéby-Tiassa Region, in the Lagunes District of Ivory Coast. The dam lies across the Bandama River, about 95 kilometres (59 mi), northwest of Agboville, the regional capital. This is approximately 141 kilometres (88 mi) northwest of Abidjan, the largest city in the country. Singrobo is located off the main highway between Abidjan and Yamoussoukro (A3), about 97 kilometres (60 mi) southeast of Yamoussoukro, the legal capital of Ivory Coast.

== Overview ==
In October 2018, the French civil engineering and construction company, Eiffage Group, was awarded the engineering, procurement and construction (EPC) contract to design and build this hydro power plant. The 44 megawatt power station involves the construction of a "mixed rockfill and concrete dam", measuring 23.5 metres (77 ft) in height and 1,374 metres (4,508 ft) in length, creating a reservoir that can store 105,000,000 cubic metres (3.708040006×10^{9} cu ft) of water.

Other related infrastructure under the same EPC, includes the construction of a "discharge channel" for the power station, a 90kV substation outside the power station, a 90kV high voltage transmission line measuring 3 kilometres (2 mi) that will evacuate the power to a location where it will enter the national grid, and access roads to the power station.

== Ownership ==
The power station is owned by a consortium comprising the shareholders outlined in the table below. The special purpose vehicle company created by the consiotium is called Ivoire Hydro Energy or IHE.

Shareholding In Singrobo Hydroelectric Power Station
Rank	Shareholder	Domicile	Notes
1	Themis Group	United States	
2	Government of Ivory Coast	Ivory Coast	
3	Africa Finance Corporation	Nigeria	
4	IHE Holding	Ivory Coast	

== Construction costs and funding ==
The cost of construction is quoted as €195 million or US$214 million. Funding agencies for this project include (a) Africa Finance Corporation (AFC) (b) Emerging Africa Infrastructure Fund (EAIF) and the German Investment Corporation (DEG). The lenders are providing an estimated 75 percent of the budget while the owner consortium will raise the remaining 25 percent as equity investment.

== Other considerations ==
The power station will on annual basis supply 217 GWh of clean energy, enabling the country to avoid the emission of 124,000 tons of carbon dioxide in the same period. During the construction period, an estimated 500 jobs are expected to be created.

The African Development Bank, agreed with the developer/owner consortium to implement a Resettlement Action Plan (RAP) involving 730 people, who "will be impacted by the project".

== See also ==
- List of power stations in Ivory Coast
