= Anno, Ivory Coast =

Village in Ivory Coast

Anno
- Village
- Location in Ivory Coast
- Coordinates: 5°51′N 4°23′W
- Country: Ivory Coast
- District: Lagunes
- Region: Agnéby-Tiassa
- Department: Agboville
- Sub-prefecture: Loviguié
- Time zone: UTC+0 (GMT)

Anno is a village in southern Ivory Coast. It is in the sub-prefecture of Loviguié, Agboville Department, Agnéby-Tiassa Region, Lagunes District.

Anno was a commune until March 2012, when it became one of 1,126 communes nationwide that were abolished.
