= Offa, Ivory Coast =

Offa
- Village
- Location in Ivory Coast
- Coordinates: 5°55′N 4°21′W
- Country: Ivory Coast
- District: Lagunes
- Region: Agnéby-Tiassa
- Department: Agboville
- Sub-prefecture: Agboville
- Time zone: UTC+0 (GMT)

Offa is a village in southern Ivory Coast. It is in the sub-prefecture of Agboville, Agboville Department, Agnéby-Tiassa Region, Lagunes District.

Offa was a commune until March 2012, when it became one of 1,126 communes nationwide that were abolished.
