= Ernest Boka =

Ivorian politician (1928–1964)

- Born: December 7, 1928; Azaguié, Ivory Coast, French West Africa
- Died: April 6, 1964 (aged 35); Agboville, Côte d'Ivoire
- Education: Doctor of Laws
- Occupations: Lawyer, minister

Ernest Boka (December 7, 1928 – April 6, 1964) was an Ivorian politician. A lawyer, Boka also served as Chief of Staff for the Governor-General of Ivory Coast in 1957, Minister of National Education in 1958 and Minister of Public Service in 1959. In 1960, he was appointed President of the Supreme Court of Ivory Coast. He headed the Ivorian delegation at the United Nations also in 1960. In 1963 he was accused along with others of plotting to kill President Houphouët-Boigny with voodoo and died in prison the following year. President Henri Konan Bédié built a mausoleum in his native village of Grand-Morié, a dozen kilometres from Agboville.
