= Dja Djédjé =

Dja Djédjé is a surname. Notable people with the surname include:

- Brice Dja Djédjé (born 1990), Ivorian footballer, cousin of Franck
- Franck Dja Djédjé (born 1986), Ivorian footballer
