= Pacobo =

Pacobo Pakobo
- Town and sub-prefecture
- Location in Ivory Coast
- Coordinates: 6°10′N 4°56′W
- Country: Ivory Coast
- District: Lagunes
- Region: Agnéby-Tiassa
- Department: Taabo

Population (2014)
  - Total: 14,510
- Time zone: UTC+0 (GMT)

Pacobo (also spelled Pakobo) is a town in southeastern Ivory Coast. It is a sub-prefecture of Taabo Department in Agnéby-Tiassa Region, Lagunes District.

Pacobo was a commune until March 2012, when it became one of 1,126 communes nationwide that were abolished.

In 2014, the population of the sub-prefecture of Pacobo was 14,510.

== Villages ==
The six villages of the sub-prefecture of Pacobo and their population in 2014 are:

1. Adikouassikro (1,186)
2. Ahérémou 1 (874)
3. Ahouakro (4,151)
4. N'da-Gnamien (3,790)
5. Pacobo (1,710)
6. Singrobo (2,799)
