= Wilfried Kanon =

Ivorian footballer

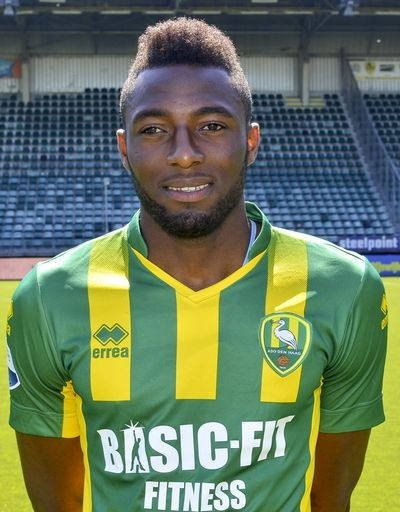
- Kanon with ADO Den Haag in 2015

Personal information
- Full name: Serge Wilfried Kanon
- Date of birth: 6 July 1993 (age 33)
- Place of birth: Taabo, Ivory Coast
- Height: 1.88 m (6 ft 2 in)
- Position: Centre-back

Team information
- Current team: Al-Jahra

Youth career
- 2010–2012: Empoli

Senior career*
Years	Team	Apps	(Gls)
2012–2013	Gloria Bistrița	25	(0)
2013	Corona Brașov	5	(0)
2013–2019	ADO Den Haag	123	(3)
2019–2022	Pyramids	16	(0)
2021	→ Al-Gharafa (loan)	7	(1)
2022	HIFK	8	(0)
2023–	Al-Jahra	0	(0)

International career^{‡}
2015–	Ivory Coast	53	(3)
Medal record
Representing Ivory Coast
Men's football
Africa Cup of Nations
Winner	2015 Guinea
- * Club domestic league appearances and goals as of 11:56, 9 February 2024 (UTC) ‡ National team caps and goals as of 23:34, 20 January 2022 (UTC)

Serge Wilfried Kanon (born 6 July 1993) is an Ivorian professional footballer who plays mainly as a centre-back for Kuwait Premier League club Al-Jahra and the Ivory Coast national team.

== Club career ==
=== Early career ===
Born in Taabo, Ivory Coast, Kanon made his debut for Empoli's junior team in 2010 in the Primavera championship. At the age of 17, he scored for the youth side in a 2–2 draw with Novara.

=== Gloria Bistrița and Corona Brașov ===
After impressing during his trial period at Gloria Bistrița in Romania, club coach Nicolae Manea decided to offer Kanon a contract. He made his Liga I debut on 22 July, in a 2–1 defeat against Astra Ploiești in which he played 40 minutes of the game.

In the 2012–13 season, Kanon and several other players followed Manea at Corona Brașov. He featured as a left-back in the campaign opener, a 1–0 defeat to Oțelul Galați at home. Kanon established himself as a regular starter, but missed the sixth fixture due to work permit issues.

=== ADO Den Haag ===
Following the work permit issues at Corona Brașov, Kanon was released to sign a two-year contract with Eredivisie team ADO Den Haag. The issues also continued in the Netherlands and prevented him from playing during the first half of the season. On 25 January 2014, he made his debut for the club in the 3–2 home win over Feyenoord.

In July 2015, Kanon was close to signing for Ligue 1 club Lille, which offered a €500,000 fee for his transfer. There, he would have been reunited with manager Hervé Renard, who coached him during Ivory Coast's conquest of the Africa Cup of Nations in 2015. Medical examinations which revealed cardiac arrhythmia made the move fall through, and Kanon returned to The Hague to undergo heart surgery.

During the 2016–17 season, he totalled 28 appearances and scored once. His only goal came on the last matchday of the season in a 4–1 win over Excelsior.

=== Pyramids ===
Kanon joined Egyptian Premier League side Pyramids on 18 September 2019. On 1 February 2021, he agreed to a six-month loan with Qatar Stars League side Al-Gharafa.

=== HIFK ===
On 28 March 2022, Kanon signed with HIFK in Finland.

== International career ==
Kanon plays his first match with Ivory Coast on 11 January 2015 against Nigeria.

== Career statistics ==
=== Club ===
As of 16 December 2024.

Appearances and goals by club, season and competition
Club	Season	League			Cup (Note: Includes KNVB Beker, Egypt Cup, Amir Cup and Suomen Cup)		League cup (Note: Includes Qatar Cup, Qatari Stars Cup and Finnish League Cup)		Continental		Total	
Club	Season	Division	Apps	Goals	Apps	Goals	Apps	Goals	Apps	Goals	Apps	Goals
Gloria Bistrița	2012–13	Liga I	25	0	–		–		–		25	0
Corona Brașov	2013–14	Liga I	5	0	–		–		–		5	0
ADO Den Haag	2013–13	Eredivisie	9	0	–		–		–		9	0
ADO Den Haag	2014–15	Eredivisie	15	0	1	0	–		–		16	0
ADO Den Haag	2015–16	Eredivisie	14	0	0	0	–		–		14	0
ADO Den Haag	2016–17	Eredivisie	28	1	2	0	–		–		30	1
ADO Den Haag	2017–18	Eredivisie	25	1	1	0	–		–		26	1
ADO Den Haag	2018–19	Eredivisie	30	1	1	0	–		–		31	1
ADO Den Haag	2019–20	Eredivisie	4	0	0	0	–		–		4	0
ADO Den Haag	Total		125	3	5	0	0	0	0	0	130	3
Pyramids	2019–20	Egyptian Premier League	16	0	2	0	–		4 (Note: Appearances in CAF Confederation Cup)	1	22	1
Al-Gharafa (loan)	2020–21	Qatar Stars League	7	1	1	0	2	0	–		10	1
HIFK	2022	Veikkausliiga	8	0	3	0	0	0	–		11	0
Al-Jahra	2023–24	Kuwait Premier League					–		–			
Career total			186	4	11	0	2	0	4	1	203	5

=== International ===
As of match played 20 January 2022

Appearances and goals by national team and year
National team	Year	Apps	Goals
Ivory Coast
Ivory Coast	2015	8	1
Ivory Coast	2016	7	0
Ivory Coast	2017	13	0
Ivory Coast	2018	6	0
Ivory Coast	2019	14	1
Ivory Coast	2020	1	0
Ivory Coast	2021	3	1
Ivory Coast	2022	1	0
Total		53	3

Scores and results list Ivory Coast's goal tally first, score column indicates score after each Kanon goal.

List of international goals scored by Wilfried Kanon
No.	Date	Venue	Opponent	Score	Result	Competition
1	4 February 2015	Estadio de Bata, Bata, Equatorial Guinea	DR Congo	3–1	3–1	2015 Africa Cup of Nations
2	13 October 2019	Stade de la Licorne, Amiens, France	DR Congo	1–0	3–1	Friendly
3	26 March 2021	Stade Général Seyni Kountché, Niamey, Niger	Niger	3–0	3–0	2021 Africa Cup of Nations qualification

== Honours ==
Ivory Coast

- Africa Cup of Nations: 2015
