= Ananguié, Agnéby-Tiassa =

Ananguié Ahandjé
- Town and sub-prefecture
- Location in Ivory Coast
- Coordinates: 6°5′N 4°28′W
- Country: Ivory Coast
- District: Lagunes
- Region: Agnéby-Tiassa
- Department: Agboville

Population (2014)
  - Total: 13,786
- Time zone: UTC+0 (GMT)

Ananguié (also spelled Ahandjé) is a town in southern Ivory Coast. It is a sub-prefecture of Agboville Department in Agnéby-Tiassa Region, Lagunes District.

Ananguié was a commune until March 2012, when it became one of 1,126 communes nationwide that were abolished.

In 2014, the population of the sub-prefecture of Ananguié was 13,786.

== Villages ==
The eight villages of the sub-prefecture of Ananguié and their population in 2014 are:

1. Achi-Brou Ho (415)
2. Adahi Kassi Ho (513)
3. Adamaho (750)
4. Aké-Douanier (618)
5. Ananguié (8,980)
6. Arrikoho (398)
7. Balet Ho (654)
8. Essegnon (1,458)
