= Yapo =

Yapo may refer to:

- Grand-Yapo
- Léonard Offoumou Yapo

== See also ==
- Yape
- Yappa
