= Offa (disambiguation) =

Offa of Mercia was King of Mercia, a kingdom of Anglo-Saxon England, from 757 until his death in July 796.

Offa or OFFA may also refer to:

== People ==
- Offa (name)
  - Offa of Angel (fl. 5th century)
  - Offa of Essex (fl. 700)
  - Offa, the father of Æscwine of Essex (fl. late 5th century)

== Places ==
- Offa, Ivory Coast, a village
- Offa, Nigeria, a town
- Offa, Wrexham, a community in Wales
- Offa (woreda), a district in Ethiopia

== Other uses ==
- HMS Offa, several ships of the Royal Navy
- Office for Fair Access, a former independent public body in England
