= Oress-Krobou =

Oress-Krobou Orès-Krobou
- Town and sub-prefecture
- Location in Ivory Coast
- Coordinates: 5°44′N 4°24′W
- Country: Ivory Coast
- District: Lagunes
- Region: Agnéby-Tiassa
- Department: Agboville

Population (2014)
  - Total: 5,806
- Time zone: UTC+0 (GMT)

Oress-Krobou (also spelled Orès-Krobou) is a town in southeastern Ivory Coast. It is a sub-prefecture of Agboville Department in Agnéby-Tiassa Region, Lagunes District.

Oress-Krobou was a commune until March 2012, when it became one of 1,126 communes nationwide that were abolished.

In 2014, the population of the sub-prefecture of Oress-Krobou was 5,806.

== Village ==
The sub-prefecture is only composed of the village of Oress-Krobou.
