= Céchi =

Céchi Séchi
- Town and sub-prefecture
- Location in Ivory Coast
- Coordinates: 6°15′N 4°25′W
- Country: Ivory Coast
- District: Lagunes
- Region: Agnéby-Tiassa
- Department: Agboville

Area
  - Total: 287 km^{2} (111 sq mi)

Population (2021 census)
  - Total: 25,967
  - Density: 90.5/km^{2} (234/sq mi)
  - Town: 10,283
- (2014 census)
- Time zone: UTC+0 (GMT)

Céchi (also spelled Séchi) is a town in south-eastern Ivory Coast. It is a sub-prefecture of Agboville Department in Agnéby-Tiassa Region, Lagunes District.

Céchi was a commune until March 2012, when it became one of 1,126 communes nationwide that were abolished.

In 2021, the population of the sub-prefecture of Céchi was 25,967.

== Villages ==
The nine villages of the sub-prefecture of Céchi and their population in 2014 are:

1. Adoukro (612)
2. Amani-N'guessankro (1,166)
3. Banguié 2 (4,132)
4. Bédé-N'goran-M'po (2,265)
5. Bonikro (1,528)
6. Céchi (10,283)
7. Kouamékro (1,173)
8. Mitichi (405)
9. Trénou (1,215)
