= Brice Dja Djédjé =

Ivorian footballer (born 1990)

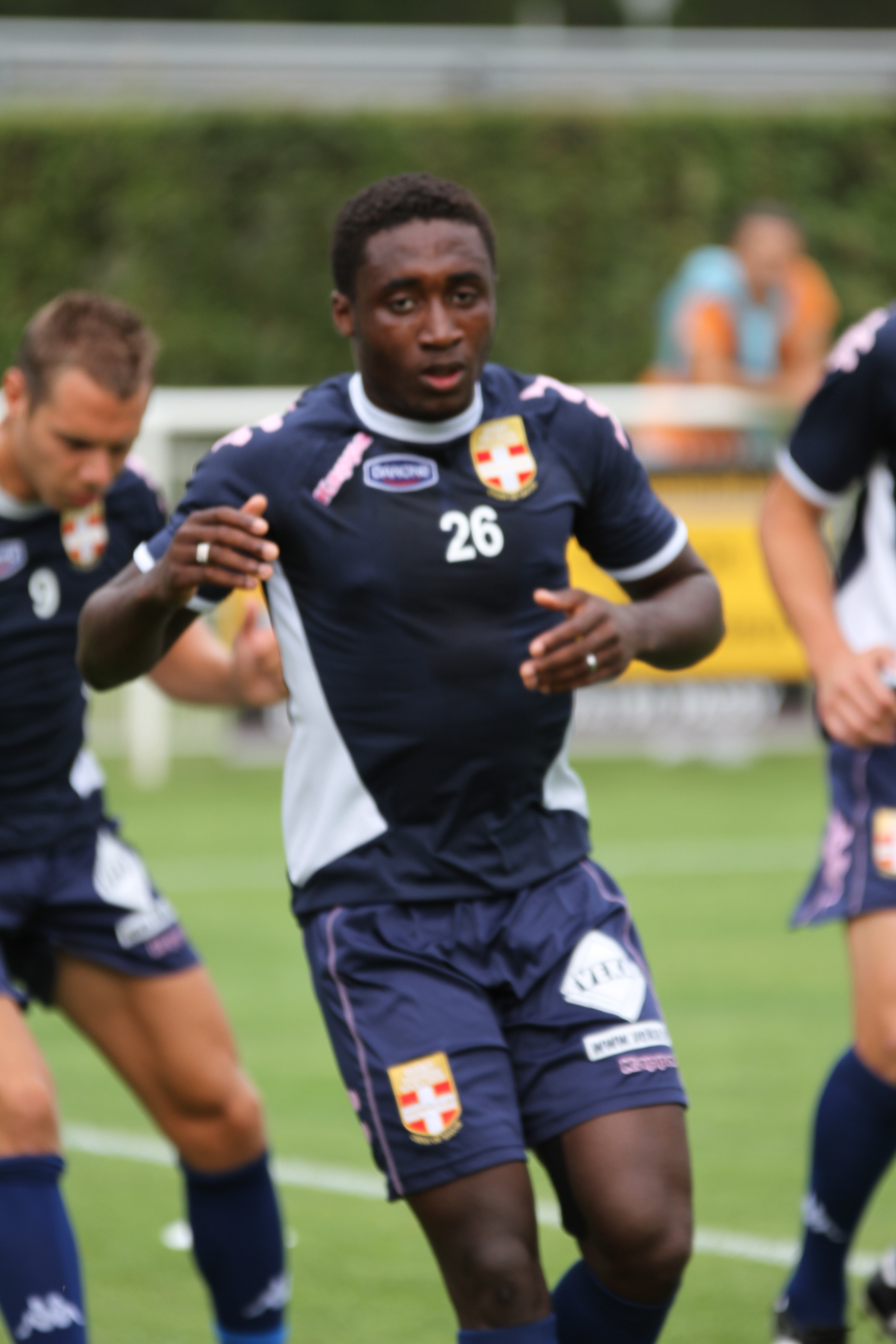

Personal information
- Full name: Brice Florentin Dja Djédjé
- Date of birth: 23 December 1990 (age 35)
- Place of birth: Aboudé, Ivory Coast
- Height: 1.70 m (5 ft 7 in)
- Positions: Right back; wing back

Team information
- Current team: ES Fosséenne

Youth career
- 1995–1998: Montrouge
- 1998–2002: Issy-les-Moulineaux
- 2002–2010: Paris Saint-Germain

Senior career*
Years	Team	Apps	(Gls)
2010–2014	Evian	93	(5)
2014–2016	Marseille	63	(0)
2016–2018	Watford	0	(0)
2018	→ Lens (loan)	10	(0)
2018–2019	Ankaragücü	19	(0)
2019–2020	Kayserispor	31	(0)
2021	Samsunspor	18	(1)
2021–2023	Denizlispor	48	(2)
2023–2024	Doxa Katokopias	13	(0)
2024	Eendracht Aalst	8	(0)
2026–	ES Fosséenne	0	(0)

International career
2013–2014	Ivory Coast	7	(0)
- * Club domestic league appearances and goals as of 27 December 2025

Brice Florentin Dja Djédjé (born 23 December 1990) is an Ivorian professional footballer who plays as a right back or wing back for Championnat National 3 club ES Fosséenne.

He began his career training at the Camp des Loges, the training centre of Paris Saint-Germain. Dja Djédjé's cousin, Franck Dja Djédjé - they grew up as brothers - is also a footballer.

== Career ==
=== Evian ===
Born in Aboudé, Ivory Coast, Dja Djédjé started his career with French side Evian and amassed over 100 appearances, scoring six times across four seasons.

=== Marseille ===
On 28 January 2014, Dja Djédjé signed a four-and-a-half-year deal with Ligue 1 club Olympique de Marseille. After sitting on the bench for some matches early in his Marseille career, Dja Djédjé quickly became a regular starter, displacing Rod Fanni as the club's first-choice right back.

In the 2014–15 season, Dja Djédjé operated as a wing back in several matches as manager Marcelo Bielsa looked for him to provide width and support for Marseille's wide attacks.

On 20 January 2016, he scored his first and only goal for Marseille in the Coupe de France in a 2–0 home win against Montpellier.

=== Watford ===
On 21 July 2016, Dja Djédjé joined Premier League side Watford for £3 million on a four-year deal. However, a foot injury meant he was left out of the Hornets' Premier League squad for the first half of the 2016–17 season. He made his debut for Watford in an FA Cup tie with Burton Albion on 7 January 2017. On 22 August 2018, Watford terminated Dja Djédjé's contract by mutual consent.

=== Ankaragücü ===
On 17 August 2018, Dja Djédjé joined Süper Lig side Ankaragücü with a two-year deal. He left the club in mid May 2019.

=== Later career ===
In December 2025, having been training with the club for the previous three months, Dja Djédjé joined Championnat National 3 – Group H club ES Fosséenne.

== International career ==
Dja Djédjé made his debut for Ivory Coast on 14 August 2013 in a 4–1 friendly defeat to Mexico. He rejected the chance to appear at the 2015 Africa Cup of Nations, deciding to opt for the guaranteed starting place at Marseille instead of a lesser role with the national team.

== Career statistics ==
=== Club ===
As of match played 21 January 2020

Appearances and goals by club, season and competition
Club	Season	League			Cup		League Cup		Europe		Total	
Club	Season	Division	Apps	Goals	Apps	Goals	Apps	Goals	Apps	Goals	Apps	Goals
Evian	2010–11	Ligue 2	18	1	0	0	2	0	—		20	1
Evian	2011–12	Ligue 1	34	2	3	0	0	0	—		37	2
Evian	2012–13	Ligue 1	27	1	4	1	0	0	—		31	2
Evian	2013–14	Ligue 1	14	1	1	0	2	0	—		17	1
Evian	Total		93	5	8	1	4	0	0	0	105	6
Marseille	2013–14	Ligue 1	11	0	0	0	0	0	—		11	0
Marseille	2014–15	Ligue 1	33	0	1	0	1	0	—		35	0
Marseille	2015–16	Ligue 1	19	0	2	1	0	0	3	0	24	1
Marseille	Total		63	0	3	1	1	0	3	0	70	1
Watford	2016–17	Premier League	0	0	2	0	0	0	—		2	0
Lens (loan)	2017–18	Ligue 2	11	0	3	0	0	0	—		14	0
Ankaragücü	2018–19	Süper Lig	19	0	0	0	—		—		19	0
Kayserispor	2019–20	Süper Lig	16	0	2	0	—		—		18	0
Career total			202	5	16	2	5	0	3	0	228	7

=== International ===
Ivory Coast
Year	Apps	Goals
2013	2	0
2014	5	0
Total	7	0
