= Charles Houdaille =

French army officer

Charles François Maurice Houdaille (1858–1916) was a French army officer. An engineer by training, he was seconded to the colonies ministry and assigned to French West Africa.

Later, having been promoted from lieutenant colonel to colonel, he was responsible for the Mission Houdaille, a survey which led to the creation of the Régie des chemins de fer Abidjan-Niger.

He was a member of the Société française de photographie (French photography society).

Houdailled died in Paris in 1916 and is buried in the Montparnasse cemetery. He was the owner of the Château de Saint-Hilaire and although his name is listed on the town war memorial, he is not officially listed as having died for France. The Avenue Houdaille in Abidjan is named after him.
