= Aboudé =

- Town and sub-prefecture
- Location in Ivory Coast
- Coordinates: 5°54′N 4°33′W
- Country: Ivory Coast
- District: Lagunes
- Region: Agnéby-Tiassa
- Department: Agboville

Area
  - Total: 316 km^{2} (122 sq mi)

Population (2021 census)
  - Total: 28,315
  - Density: 89.6/km^{2} (232/sq mi)
  - Town: 11,439
- (2014 census)
- Time zone: UTC+0 (GMT)

Aboudé is a town in southern Ivory Coast. It is a sub-prefecture of Agboville Department in Agnéby-Tiassa Region, Lagunes District.

Aboudé was a commune until March 2012, when it became one of 1,126 communes nationwide that were abolished.

In 2021, the population of the sub-prefecture of Aboudé was 28,315.

== Villages ==
The 3 villages of the sub-prefecture of Aboudé and their population in 2014 are:

1. Aboude-Kouassikro (11,439)
2. Aboude-Mandéké (7,357)
3. Kouadjokro (1,000)
