= Taabo Department =

Coordinates: 6°14′N 5°8′W

Taabo Department Département de Taabo
- Department
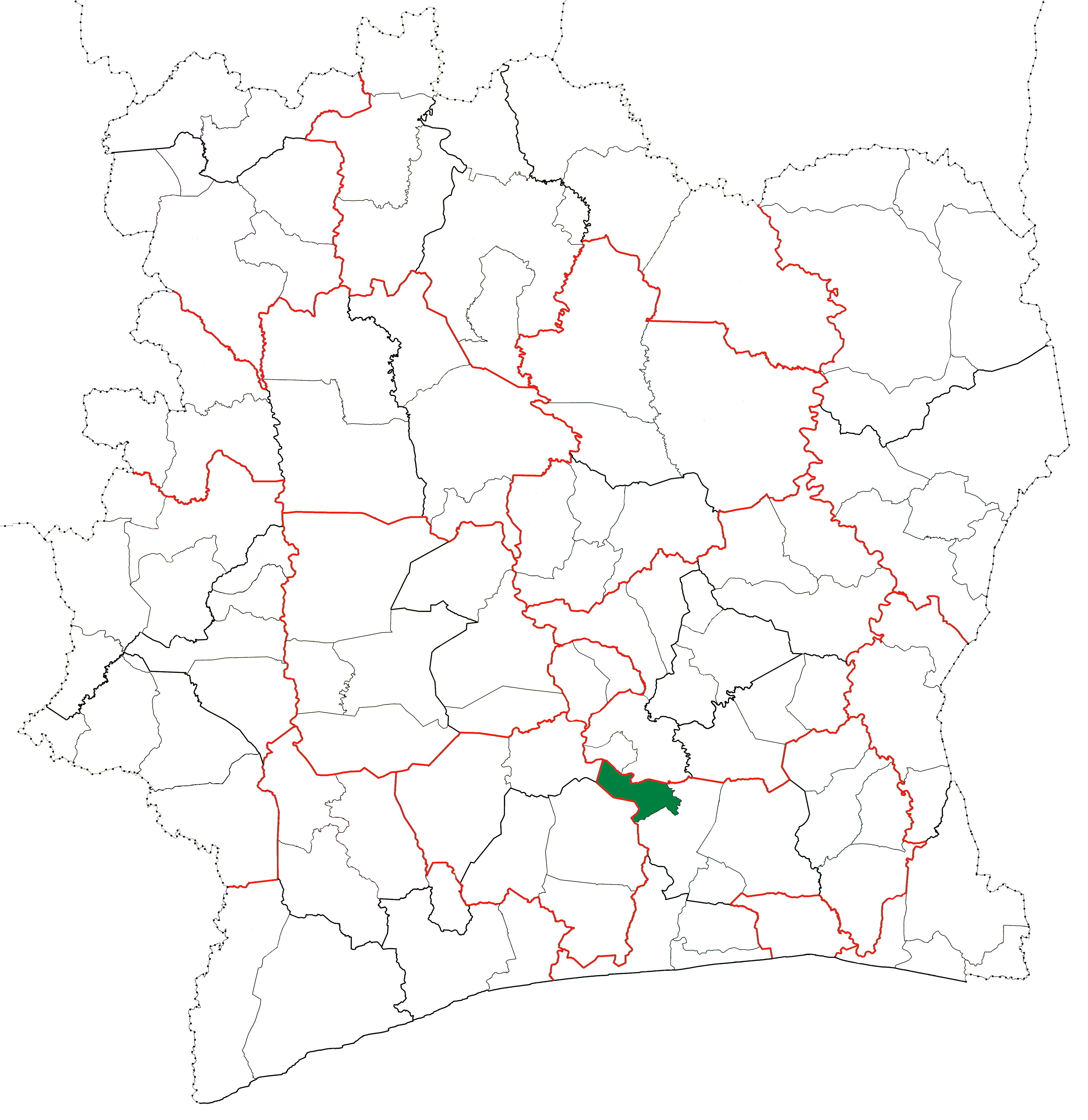
- Location in Ivory Coast. Taabo Department has retained the same boundaries since its creation in 2012.
- Country: Ivory Coast
- District: Lagunes
- Region: Agnéby-Tiassa
- 2012: Established via a division of Tiassalé Dept
- Departmental seat: Taabo

Government
  - Prefect: Koukougnon Legré

Area
  - Total: 928 km^{2} (358 sq mi)

Population (2021 census)
  - Total: 76,761
  - Density: 82.7/km^{2} (214/sq mi)
- Time zone: UTC+0 (GMT)

Taabo Department is a department of Agnéby-Tiassa Region in Lagunes District, Ivory Coast. In 2021, its population was 76,761 and its seat is the settlement of Taabo. The sub-prefectures of the department are Pacobo and Taabo.

== History ==
Taabo Department was created in 2012 by dividing Tiassalé Department.
