= Guessiguié =

- Town and sub-prefecture
- Location in Ivory Coast
- Coordinates: 5°44′N 4°14′W
- Country: Ivory Coast
- District: Lagunes
- Region: Agnéby-Tiassa
- Department: Agboville

Population (2014)
  - Total: 21,911
- Time zone: UTC+0 (GMT)

Guessiguié is a town in south-eastern Ivory Coast. It is a sub-prefecture of Agboville Department in Agnéby-Tiassa Region, Lagunes District. The town is divided into two halves, Guessiguié I and Guessiguié II. The town is 15 kilometres north of the border of Abidjan Autonomous District.

Guessiguié was a commune until March 2012, when it became one of 1,126 communes nationwide that were abolished.

In 2014, the population of the sub-prefecture of Guessiguié was 21,911.

== Villages ==
The 12 villages of the sub-prefecture of Guessiguié and their population in 2014 are:

1. Aké-Béfiat (1,264)
2. Allahin (460)
3. Attéhou (1,076)
4. Dingbè (1,055)
5. Elévi (1,187)
6. Guessiguié 1 (2,413)
7. Guessiguié 2 (2,359)
8. Kassiguié (1,955)
9. M'brou (5,700)
10. Odoguié (1,690)
11. Ottopé 1 (1,835)
12. Ottopé 2 (917)
