= Tiassalé =

- Town, sub-prefecture, and commune
- Location in Ivory Coast
- Coordinates: 5°54′N 4°50′W
- Country: Ivory Coast
- District: Lagunes
- Region: Agnéby-Tiassa
- Department: Tiassalé

Area
  - Total: 646 km^{2} (249 sq mi)

Population (2021 census)
  - Total: 83,648
  - Density: 129/km^{2} (335/sq mi)
  - Town: 20,057
- (2014 census)
- Time zone: UTC+0 (GMT)

Tiassalé is a town in southern Ivory Coast. It is a sub-prefecture and the seat of Tiassalé Department in Agnéby-Tiassa Region, Lagunes District. Tiassalé is also a commune.

In 2021, the population of the sub-prefecture of Tiassalé was 83,648.

== Villages ==
The 19 villages of the sub-prefecture of Tiassalé and their population in 2014 are:

1. Dibykro (702)
2. Komenan Kpekro (1 210)
3. Mafia (650)
4. Niamoué (2 645)
5. Taboitien (723)
6. Tiassalé (20 057)
7. Ahua (1 491)
8. Broukro (1 248)
9. Eticoon (485)
10. Gnankan-Gnankanso (1 470)
11. Gnanzombly (1 310)
12. Kouadio-Yaokro (5 969)
13. M'brimbo (3 639)
14. Nanan Yassouakro (732)
15. N'zianouan (12 603)
16. Sindressou (732)
17. Sodefor Mopri (1 723)
18. Tiassalékro (300)
19. Tollakro (559)
