= N'Douci =

N'Douci Ndouci
- Town and sub-prefecture
- Location in Ivory Coast
- Coordinates: 5°52′N 4°45′W
- Country: Ivory Coast
- District: Lagunes
- Region: Agnéby-Tiassa
- Department: Tiassalé

Area
  - Total: 302 km^{2} (117 sq mi)

Population (2021 census)
  - Total: 97,194
  - Density: 322/km^{2} (834/sq mi)
  - Town: 27,112
- (2014 census)
- Time zone: UTC+0 (GMT)

N'Douci (also spelled Ndouci) is a town in southern Ivory Coast. It is a sub-prefecture of Tiassalé Department in Agnéby-Tiassa Region, Lagunes District. N'Douci was a commune until March 2012, when it became one of 1,126 communes nationwide that were abolished. In 2021, the population of the sub-prefecture of N'Douci was 97,194.

== Villages ==
The 12 villages of the sub-prefecture of N'Douci and their population in 2014 are:

1. Abevé/Abeyé (2,119)
2. Akoudjé (635)
3. Attiguéhi (7,396)
4. Batéra (2,799)
5. Bodo (4,304)
6. Boussoukro (1,736)
7. Kanga-Nianzé (3,381)
8. Kodimasso (1,373)
9. N'douci (27,112)
10. Niamazra (3,677)
11. Nianda (1,608)
12. Offa (850)
