= Grand-Morié =

- Town and sub-prefecture
- Location in Ivory Coast
- Coordinates: 5°59′N 4°8′W
- Country: Ivory Coast
- District: Lagunes
- Region: Agnéby-Tiassa
- Department: Agboville

Population (2014)
  - Total: 17,907
- Time zone: UTC+0 (GMT)

Grand-Morié is a town in south-eastern Ivory Coast. It is a sub-prefecture of Agboville Department in Agnéby-Tiassa Region, Lagunes District.

Grand-Morié was a commune until March 2012, when it became one of 1,126 communes nationwide that were abolished.

In 2014, the population of the sub-prefecture of Grand-Morié was 17,907.

== Villages ==
The eight villages of the sub-prefecture of Grand-Morié and their population in 2014 are:

1. Agouahin (944)
2. Arraguié (3,284)
3. Grand-Morié (5,991)
4. Lapo (1,916)
5. Mafou (529)
6. M'battra (1,444)
7. M'bérié (3,378)
8. Okouguié (421)
