= Attobrou =

- Town and sub-prefecture
- Location in Ivory Coast
- Coordinates: 6°5′N 4°4′W
- Country: Ivory Coast
- District: Lagunes
- Region: Agnéby-Tiassa
- Department: Agboville

Population (2014)
  - Total: 20,454
- Time zone: UTC+0 (GMT)

Attobrou is a town in south-eastern Ivory Coast. It is a sub-prefecture of Agboville Department in Agnéby-Tiassa Region, Lagunes District.

Attobrou was a commune until March 2012, when it became one of 1,126 communes nationwide that were abolished.

In 2014, the population of the sub-prefecture of Attobrou was 20,454.

== Villages ==
The five villages of the sub-prefecture of Attobrou and their population in 2014 are:

1. Attobrou (8,556)
2. Boguié (1,436)
3. Copa (2,679)
4. Séguié (4,232)
5. Yadio (3,551)
