= Houphouët-Boigny Bridge =

Bridge in Ivory Coast

Coordinates: 5°18′43.5″N 4°1′9.5″W

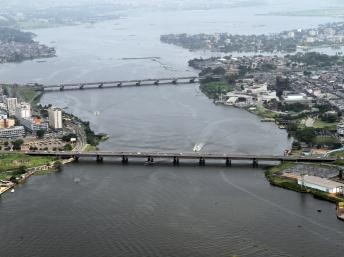
- Span range: 372 m
- Material: Precast prestressed concrete
- Movable: no
- Design effort: Boussiron
- Falsework required: No

Houphouët-Boigny Bridge is a road and rail bridge over the Ébrié Lagoon which links the two halves of the city of Abidjan in Ivory Coast.

The structure is a girder bridge, hollow box, double deck bridge with eight spans of 46.5 m (153 ft), each thus resulting a total length of 372 m (1,220 ft).
