= Gbolouville =

- Town and sub-prefecture
- Location in Ivory Coast
- Coordinates: 5°47′N 4°40′W
- Country: Ivory Coast
- District: Lagunes
- Region: Agnéby-Tiassa
- Department: Tiassalé

Area
  - Total: 480 km^{2} (190 sq mi)

Population (2021 census)
  - Total: 42,476
  - Density: 88/km^{2} (230/sq mi)
  - Town: 12,591
- (2014 census)
- Time zone: UTC+0 (GMT)

Gbolouville is a town in southern Ivory Coast. It is a sub-prefecture of Tiassalé Department in Agnéby-Tiassa Region, Lagunes District.

Gbolouville was a commune until March 2012, when it became one of 1,126 communes nationwide that were abolished.

In 2021, the population of the sub-prefecture of Gbolouville was 42,476.

== Villages ==
The nine villages of the sub-prefecture of Gbolouville and their population in 2014 are:

1. Akalékro (3,590)
2. Akoungou (2,229)
3. Amani Kouamékro (638)
4. Assinzé (936)
5. Botindé (3,676)
6. Broubrou (4,221)
7. Ehuakré (463)
8. Elosso (510)
9. Gbolouville (12,591)
