= Loviguié =

- Town and sub-prefecture
- Location in Ivory Coast
- Coordinates: 5°49′N 4°20′W
- Country: Ivory Coast
- District: Lagunes
- Region: Agnéby-Tiassa
- Department: Agboville

Population (2014)
  - Total: 17,048
- Time zone: UTC+0 (GMT)

Loviguié is a town in southern Ivory Coast. It is a sub-prefecture of Agboville Department in Agnéby-Tiassa Region, Lagunes District.

Loviguié was a commune until March 2012, when it became one of 1,126 communes nationwide that were abolished.

In 2014, the population of the sub-prefecture of Loviguié was 17,048.

== Villages ==
The five villages of the sub-prefecture of Loviguié and their population in 2014 are:

1. Anno (5,858)
2. Gbessé (1,833)
3. Loviguié 1 (2,782)
4. Loviguié 2 (4,124)
5. Wahin (2,451)
