= Taabo =

- Town, sub-prefecture, and commune
- Location in Ivory Coast
- Coordinates: 6°14′N 5°8′W
- Country: Ivory Coast
- District: Lagunes
- Region: Agnéby-Tiassa
- Department: Taabo

Area
  - Total: 572 km^{2} (221 sq mi)

Population (2021 census)
  - Total: 57,189
  - Density: 100/km^{2} (259/sq mi)
- Time zone: UTC+0 (GMT)

Taabo is a town in southeastern Ivory Coast. It is a sub-prefecture of and the seat of Taabo Department in Agnéby-Tiassa Region, Lagunes District. Taabo is also a commune.

In 2021, the population of the sub-prefecture of Taabo was 57,189.

== Villages ==
The 14 villages of the sub-prefecture of Taabo and their population in 2014 are:

1. Ahondo (2 786)
2. Kokoti-Kouamékro (1 696)
3. Kotiessou (2 262)
4. N'denou (2 499)
5. Taabo (6 372)
6. Taabo Village (4 935)
7. Ahérémou 2 (2 055)
8. Ahouati (1 857)
9. Amani Ménou (4 729)
10. Kathénou (915)
11. Léléblé (5 300)
12. Sahoua (1 496)
13. Sokrogbo (1 911)
14. Tokohiri (3 099)
