= Azaguié =

- Town, sub-prefecture, and commune
- Location in Ivory Coast
- Coordinates: 5°38′N 4°5′W
- Country: Ivory Coast
- District: Lagunes
- Region: Agnéby-Tiassa
- Department: Agboville

Area
  - Total: 350 km^{2} (140 sq mi)

Population (2021 census)
  - Total: 38,066
  - Density: 110/km^{2} (280/sq mi)
  - Town: 13,876
- (2014 census)
- Time zone: UTC+0 (GMT)

Azaguié is a town in south-eastern Ivory Coast. It is a sub-prefecture and commune of Agboville Department in Agnéby-Tiassa Region, Lagunes District. The border of Abidjan Autonomous District is three kilometres south of the town.

In 2021, the population of the sub-prefecture of Azaguié was 38,066.

== Villages ==
The 6 villages of the sub-prefecture of Azaguié and their population in 2014 are:

1. Abbé-Bégnini (2 627)
2. Azaguié (13 876)
3. Achiékoi (984)
4. Azaguié-Makouguié (1 296)
5. Azaguié-M'bromé (2 694)
6. Donkoi (499)
