= Morokro =

- Town and sub-prefecture
- Location in Ivory Coast
- Coordinates: 6°5′N 4°42′W
- Country: Ivory Coast
- District: Lagunes
- Region: Agnéby-Tiassa
- Department: Tiassalé

Area
  - Total: 936 km^{2} (361 sq mi)

Population (2021 census)
  - Total: 55,636
  - Density: 59.4/km^{2} (154/sq mi)
- Time zone: UTC+0 (GMT)

Morokro is a town in southern Ivory Coast. It is a sub-prefecture of Tiassalé Department in Agnéby-Tiassa Region, Lagunes District.

Morokro was a commune until March 2012, when it became one of 1,126 communes nationwide that were abolished.

In 2021, the population of the sub-prefecture of Morokro was 55,636.

== Villages ==
The 15 villages of the sub-prefecture of Morokro and their population in 2014 are:

1. Adomkro (1,356)
2. Affikro (259)
3. Affounvassou (2,075)
4. Ahiroa (3,587)
5. Amanikro (1,809)
6. Diallokro (2,551)
7. Djahakro (1,381)
8. Ehouman Koffikro (797)
9. Kassasso (340)
10. Kondiébouma (5,301)
11. Koyékro (5,507)
12. Kravasso (1,713)
13. Moofoué (1,546)
14. Morokro (4,675)
15. Trochu (2,893)
