= Agboville Department =

Coordinates: 5°56′N 4°13′W

Agboville Department Département d'Agboville
- Department
- Location in Ivory Coast. Agboville Department has retained the same boundaries since its creation in 1969.
- Country: Ivory Coast
- District: Lagunes
- Region: Agnéby-Tiassa
- 1969: Established as a first-level subdivision
- 1997: Converted to a second-level subdivision
- 2011: Converted to a third-level subdivision
- Departmental seat: Agboville

Government
  - Prefect: Anatole-Privat Bako Digbe

Area
  - Total: 4,060 km^{2} (1,570 sq mi)

Population (2021 census)
  - Total: 384,340
  - Density: 94.7/km^{2} (245/sq mi)
- Time zone: UTC+0 (GMT)

Agboville Department is a department of Agnéby-Tiassa Region in Lagunes District, Ivory Coast. In 2021, its population was 384,340 and its seat is the settlement of Agboville. The sub-prefectures of the department are Aboudé, Ananguié, Agboville, Attobrou, Azaguié, Céchi, Grand-Morié, Guessiguié, Loviguié, Oress-Krobou, and Rubino.

== History ==
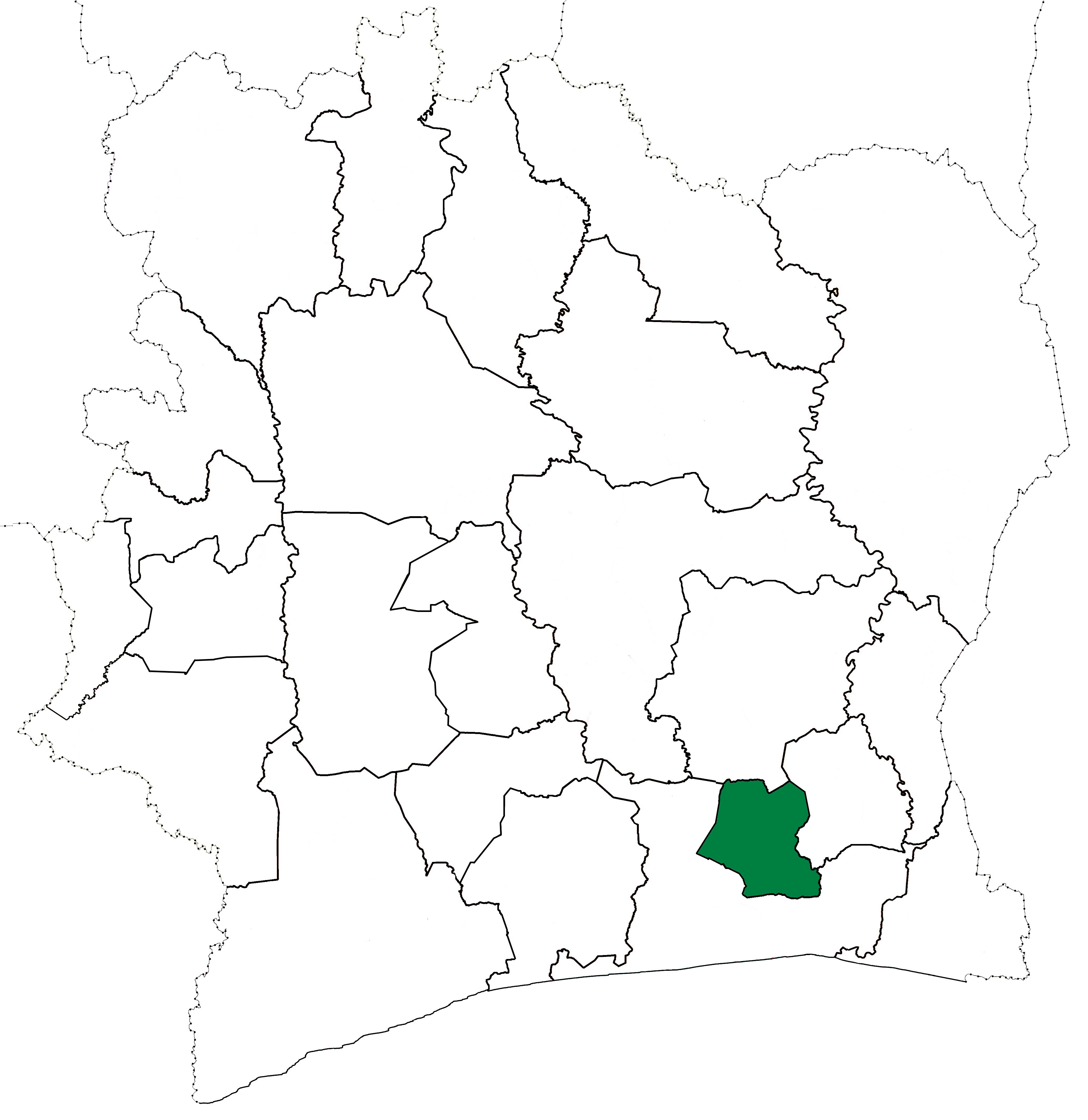
Agboville Department upon its creation in 1969. Although it has kept these boundaries, other departments began to be divided in 1974.

Agboville Department was created in 1969 as one of the 24 new departments that were created to take the place of the six departments that were being abolished. It was created from territory that was formerly part of Sud Department.

In 1997, regions were introduced as new first-level subdivisions of Ivory Coast; as a result, all departments were converted into second-level subdivisions. Agboville Department was combined with Adzopé Department to form Agnéby Region.

In 2011, districts were introduced as new first-level subdivisions of Ivory Coast. At the same time, regions were reorganised and became second-level subdivisions and all departments were converted into third-level subdivisions. At this time, Agboville Department became part of Agnéby-Tiassa Region in Lagunes District.

Agboville Department retains the same boundaries that it had in 1969; it is the only one of the 24 new departments that were created in 1969 that has not been divided.
