= Agboville =

- Town, sub-prefecture, and commune
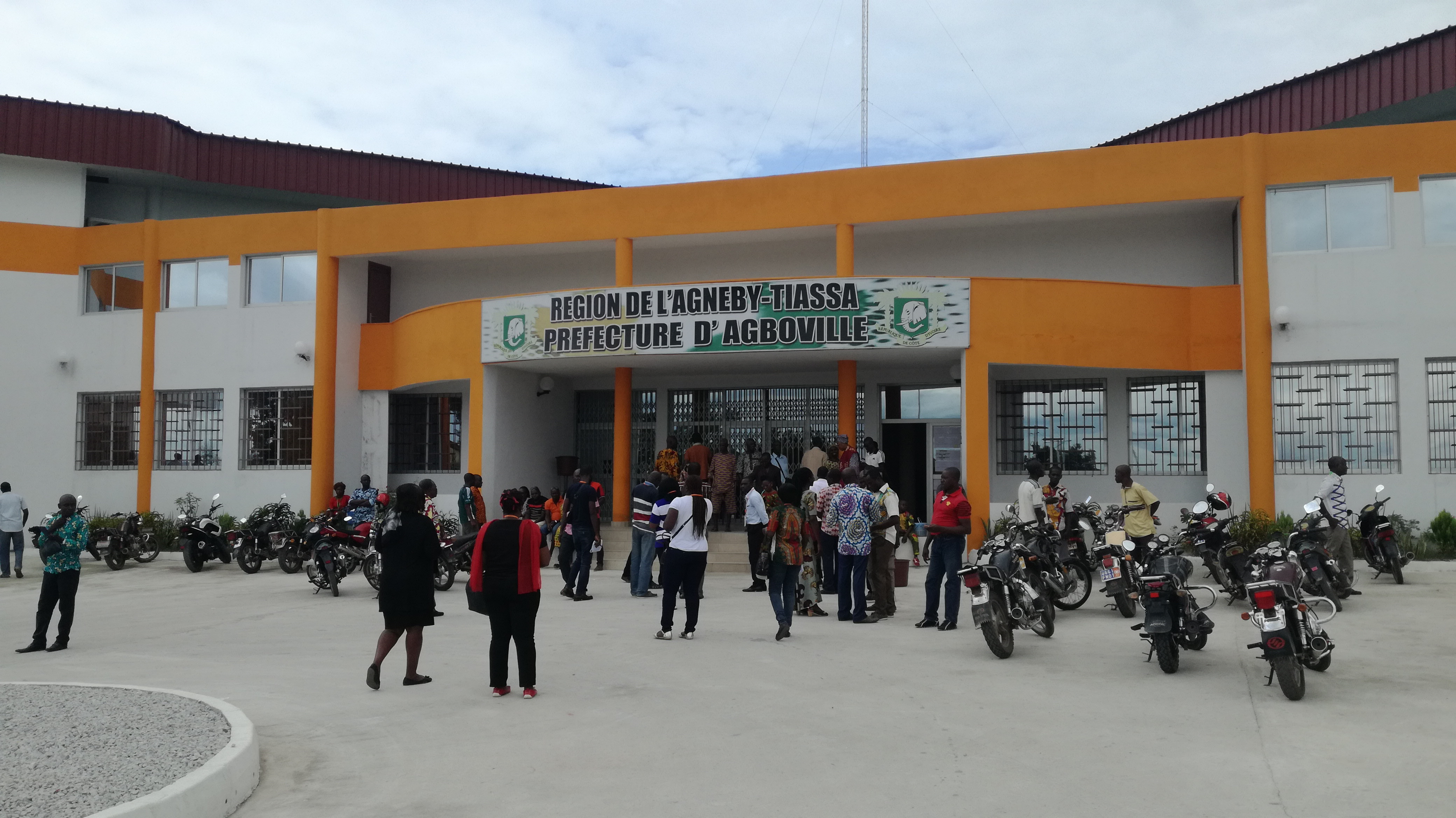
- Préfecture d’Agboville

- Location in Ivory Coast
- Coordinates: 5°56′N 4°13′W
- Country: Ivory Coast
- District: Lagunes
- Region: Agnéby-Tiassa
- Department: Agboville

Area
  - Total: 870 km^{2} (340 sq mi)

Population (2021 census)
  - Total: 135,082
  - Density: 160/km^{2} (400/sq mi)
  - Town: 50,873
- (2014 census)
- Time zone: UTC+0 (GMT)

Agboville is the town in south-eastern Ivory Coast. It is a sub-prefecture of and the seat of Agboville Department. It is also a commune and the seat of Agnéby-Tiassa Region in Lagunes District.

Agboville is situated 79 km north of Abidjan. The local ethnic group is the Abbey. The Abbey is one of over 60 ethnic groups in Ivory Coast, and are usually considered to be an Akan subgroup. The Abbey people have many traditions related to family and friends. One important holiday for the Abbeys is "La fête des ignames" or the "Yam Festival". Historically, the festival is a celebration of a good harvest of yams because yams have been the greatest resource for the Abbey region of Agboville.

Agboville is the seat of the Roman Catholic Diocese of Agboville.

== History ==
Agboville was the seat of the Agneby region from 1997 to 2011.

== Transport ==
Agboville is served by a station of the national railway system.

== See also ==
- Agnéby-Tiassa Region
- Lagunes District
- Roman Catholic Diocese of Agboville
- Akan
