= Tiassalé Department =

Coordinates: 5°54′N 4°50′W

Tiassalé Department Département de Tiassalé
- Department
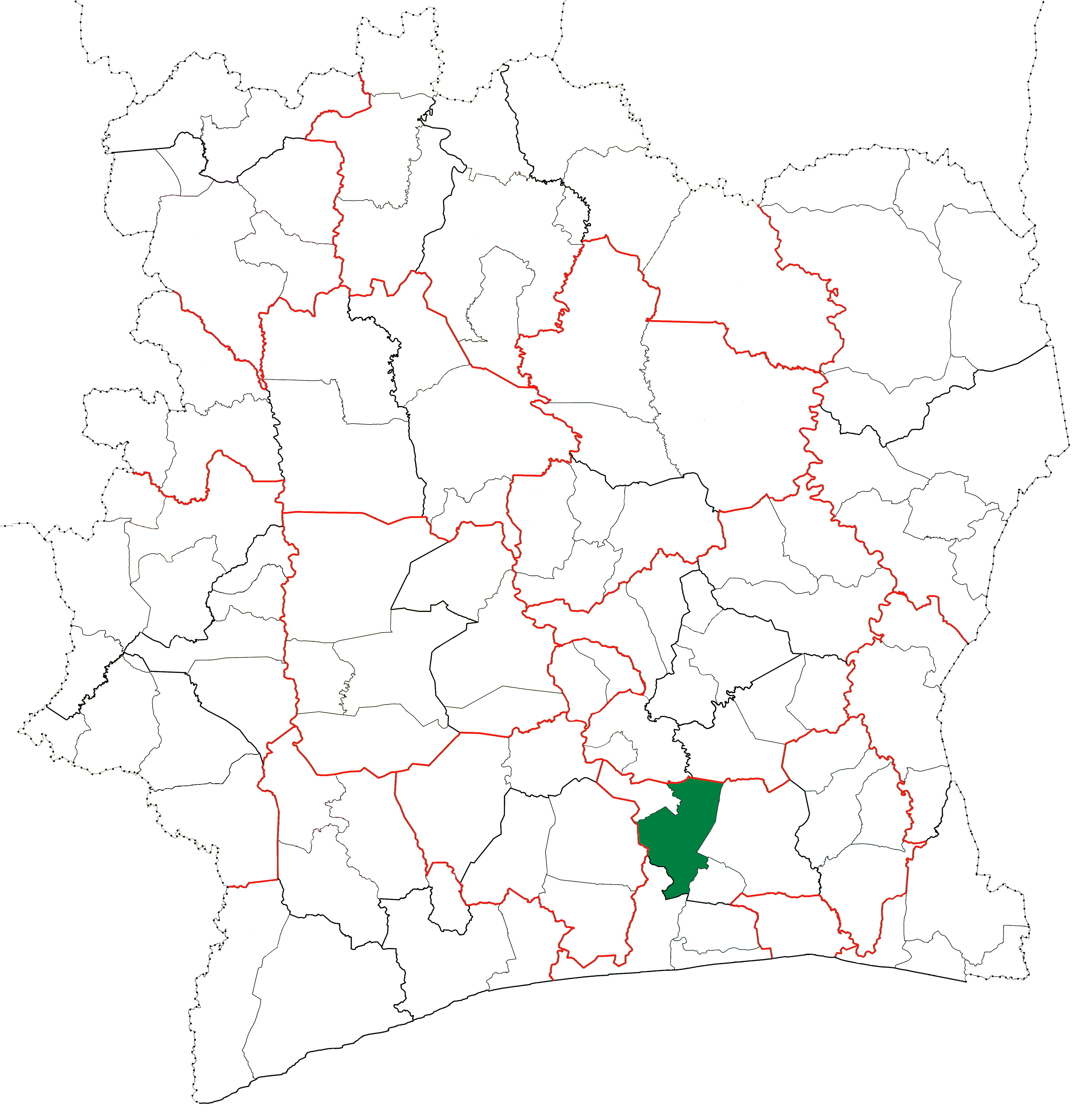
- Location in Ivory Coast. Tiassalé Department has had these boundaries since 2012.
- Country: Ivory Coast
- District: Lagunes
- Region: Agnéby-Tiassa
- 1988: Established as a first-level subdivision via a division of Abidjan Dept
- 1997: Converted to a second-level subdivision
- 2011: Converted to a third-level subdivision
- 2012: Divided to create Taabo Dept
- Departmental seat: Tiassalé

Government
  - Prefect: Jules Gouesse

Area
  - Total: 2,360 km^{2} (910 sq mi)

Population (2021 census)
  - Total: 278,954
  - Density: 118/km^{2} (306/sq mi)
- Time zone: UTC+0 (GMT)

Tiassalé Department is a department of Agnéby-Tiassa Region in Lagunes District, Ivory Coast. In 2021, its population was 278,954 and its seat is the settlement of Tiassalé. The sub-prefectures of the department are Gbolouville, Morokro, N'Douci, and Tiassalé.

== History ==
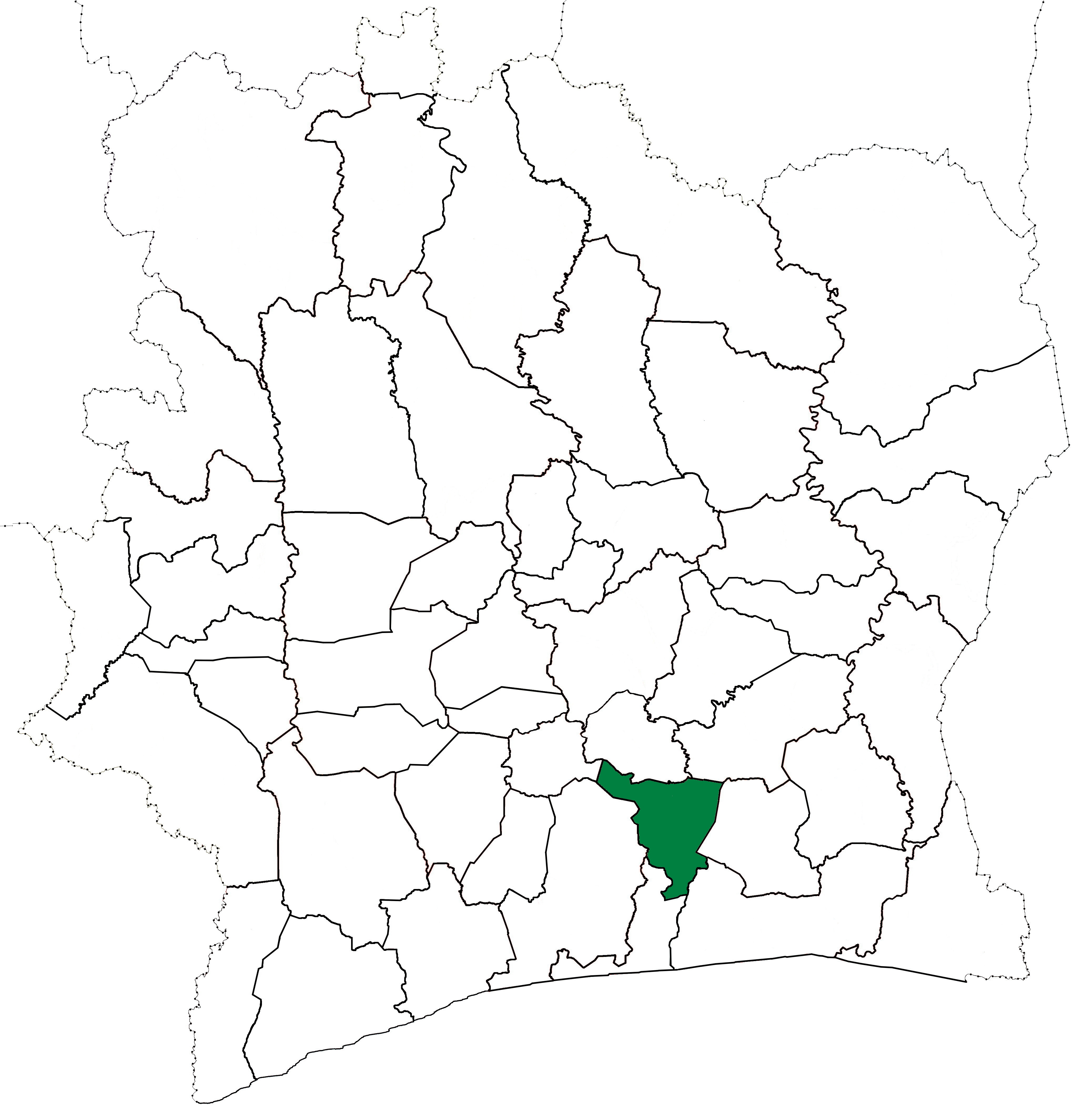
Tiassalé Department upon its creation in 1988. It kept these boundaries until 2012, but other subdivision boundary changes began to be made in 1995.

Tiassalé Department was created in 1988 as a first-level subdivision via a split-off from Abidjan Department.

In 1997, regions were introduced as new first-level subdivisions of Ivory Coast; as a result, all departments were converted into second-level subdivisions. Tiassalé Department was included in Lagunes Region.

In 2011, districts were introduced as new first-level subdivisions of Ivory Coast. At the same time, regions were reorganised and became second-level subdivisions and all departments were converted into third-level subdivisions. At this time, Tiassalé Department became part of Agnéby-Tiassa Region in Lagunes District.

In 2012, two sub-prefectures were split from Tiassalé Department to create Taabo Department.
