= Agnéby-Tiassa =

Coordinates: 6°0′N 4°0′W

Agnéby-Tiassa Region Région de l'Agnéby-Tiassa
- Region
- Seal

- Location of Agnéby-Tiassa Region (dark green) in Ivory Coast and in Lagunes District
- Country: Ivory Coast
- District: Lagunes
- Established: 2011
- Regional seat: Agboville

Government
  - Prefect: Anatole-Privat Bako Digbe
  - Council President: Nando Martin M'Bolo

Area
  - Total: 8,110 km^{2} (3,130 sq mi)

Population (2021 census)
  - Total: 865,951
  - Density: 107/km^{2} (277/sq mi)
- Time zone: UTC+0 (GMT)
- Website: agneby-tiassa.ci

Agnéby-Tiassa Region is one of the 31 regions of Ivory Coast. Since its establishment in 2011, it has been one of three regions in Lagunes District. The seat of the region is Agboville and the region's population in the 2021 census was 865,951.

Agnéby-Tiassa is currently divided into four departments: Agboville, Sikensi, Taabo, and Tiassalé.
