= Dogon country =

Region of Mali and Burkina Faso

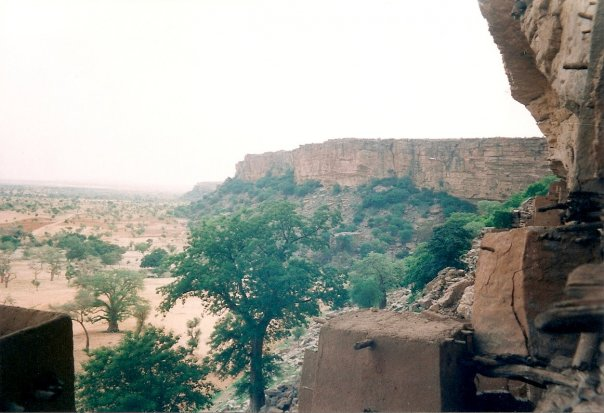
The Bandiagara cliff and its view of the plain.

Dogon country (French: Pays Dogon) is a region of eastern Mali and northwestern Burkina Faso populated mainly by the Dogon people, a diverse ethnic group in West Africa with diverse languages. Like the term Serer country occupied by the Serer ethnic group further to the west, Dogon country is vast. It lies southwest of the Niger River belt. The region is composed of three zones: the plateau, the escarpment and the Seno-Gondo plain.

In Mali, this historic region belongs to the Mopti Region and extends on either side of the Bandiagara Escarpment. Dogon country in Mali is the most visited tourist area of the country, due to the Dogon people's rich cultural heritage. Sangha, Mali is the heart of Dogon country with its rich history of Dogon religion, shrines and temples.

== Landscapes ==
Starting from the Niger River in a south-eastern direction, towards Burkina Faso, we successively meet three types of landscapes in Dogon country: plateau, cliff and plain.

=== Plateau ===
The region is a vast sandstone plateau rising gradually from the river to the cliff. It is on this plateau that Bandiagara, the “capital” of Dogon country is established.

=== Cliff ===
Its often almost vertical wall faces Burkina Faso. With a height varying from 100 to around 400 m, it overlooks the Seno plain, which is between 250 and 300 m above sea level.

It is about 200 km long and oriented from southwest to northeast starting from Ségué in the south, and ending in Douentza in the north. The altitude increases from south to north until it reaches 791 m near Bamba, Koro.

It is the emblematic place of the country and its main center of tourist attraction.

=== Plain ===
Located at the foot of the cliff, the Séno-Gondo plain stretches to the Burkinabé border.

== Archeology ==
The Dogon country has many vestiges of ancient habitat from successive periods of occupation. From the ancient Toloy and Tellem, to the Dogon.

There is the rocky channel located near Sangha where the remains of the Toloy were found, such as granaries, skeletons, pottery and plants, with a carbon-14 dating of 3rd and 2nd centuries BC.

=== Religion and festivals ===
The Dogon religion is the traditional African beliefs of the Dogon of Mali. Those who follow this spiritual path believe in one Supreme Creator, Amma (or Ama), the omnipotent, omniscient and omnipresent Creator.

They also believe in ancestral spirits such as the Serpent Ancestor Lebe, and the "Water Spirits" Nommo. Veneration of the ancestors forms an important aspect of Dogon religion. They hold ritual mask dances immediately after the death of a person and sometimes long after they have passed on to the next life. Twins, "the need for duality and the doubling of individual lives" (masculine and feminine principles) is a fundamental element in their belief system. Like other traditional African religions, balance, and reverence for nature are also key elements.

Many Dogons have also converted to Islam recently despite centuries of fleeing persecution and Islamization from other dominant communities.

== Villages ==
Most Dogon villages are located within Mopti Region, Mali. The tables below list the number of villages by Dogon language group as of 2004. All of the villages and cercles listed below are located within Mopti Region, with the exception of Tominian Cercle in Ségou Region. However, due to the presently ongoing Mali War that had begun in the early 2010s, some of the villages in the region may have already been abandoned.

Distribution of Dogon villages in Bandiagara Cercle
Commune	Number of villages by Dogon subgroup (2004)
Bandiagara	34 Donno-sɔ, 9 Mombo, 1 Tɔmmɔ-sɔ, 1 Tomo-kan
Kendié	29 Bondum, 14 Dogulu, 13 Tɔmmɔ-sɔ, 5 Tiranige-diga
Ningari	47 Tɔmmɔ-sɔ, 5 Bondum, 3 Nanga
Kani-Gogouna	30 Tɔmmɔ-sɔ, 14 Dogulu, 12 Donno-sɔ, 1 Tɔrɔ-sɔɔ
Goundaka	15 Mombo, 3 Bangime, 2 Korandabo, 1 Tɔmmɔ-sɔ, 8 Tiranige-diga
Sangha	74 Tɔrɔ-sɔɔ, 7 Donno-sɔ, 1 Jamsay
Dourou	12 Donno-sɔ, 4 Tɔrɔ-sɔɔ
Ouo	57 Tomo-kan, 12 Ampari

Distribution of Dogon villages in Koro Cercle
Commune	Number of villages by Dogon subgroup (2004)
Koro	24 Jamsay, 19 Togo-kan, 14 Tɔrɔ-sɔ, 4 Teŋu-kan, 2 Tomo-kan
Diankabou	24 Jamsay, 15 Tɔmmɔ-sɔ, 6 Yanda, 3 Oru Yille, 3 Tɔrɔ-sɔ, 1 Nanga
Dinangourou	19 Jamsay
Dioungani	32 Jamsay, 8 Tɔrɔ-sɔɔ, 1 Togo-kan
Madougou	48 Tɔrɔ-sɔɔ, 28 Jamsay, 1 Tɔmmɔ-sɔ, 1 Togo-kan
Koporokénié-Na	32 Togo-kan, 1 Jamsay, 1 Tɔrɔ-sɔɔ, 1 Teŋu-kan
Toroli	30 Togo-kan, 3 Teŋu-kan, 1 Jamsay

Distribution of Dogon villages in Bankass Cercle
Commune	Number of villages by Dogon subgroup (2004)
Bankass	12 Teŋu-kan, 10 Tomo-kan
Kani-Bonzon	24 Tomo-kan
Diallassagou	57 Tomo-kan
Ségué	45 Tomo-kan
Baye	2 Tomo-kan
Sokoura	15 Tomo-kan
Ouenkoro	4 Tomo-kan

Distribution of Dogon villages in Douentza Cercle
Commune	Number of villages by Dogon subgroup (2004)
Douentza	26 Bondum, 28 Tɔmmɔ-sɔ, 10 Jamsay
Mondoro	15 Jamsay
Boré	28 Bondum
Boni	12 Tɔrɔ-tegu

Distribution of Dogon villages in Tominian Cercle, Ségou Region
Commune	Villages by Dogon subgroup (2004)
Timissa	10 Tomo-kan
Koula	4 Tomo-kan, 1 Ampari

In addition, there is one Tomo-kan village in Djenné Cercle.

== Biodiversity ==
The irregularities of the rocky plateau lead to high concentrations of water. Because of this beyond a typical Sahelian vegetation, extremely arid zones can overlap with a variety of lush green oases, holding pockets of extraordinary biodiversity.

Each microclimate in the region offers a unique assortment of medicinal plants and tree species with significant value for the population, such as shea, the locust bean, Faidherbia albida, the tamarind, African palmyra palm, and the baobab.

The Dogon country also has many bird species.

=== Insects ===
Dogon ethnoentomology has been thoroughly documented by Jeffrey Heath. The following are various types of insects that are well known to the Northern Dogon people.

Beetles

- Steraspis and Sternocera (jewel beetles)
- Bostrichidae (rectangular black beetles)
- Elephenus fasciatus (click beetle)
- Dineutus sp. (whirlygig beetle)
- Lampyridae (fireflies)
- Meloidae (blister beetles)
- Pachnoda and Rhabdotis (millet beetles): including Pachnoda cordata, Pachnoda interrupta, Pachnoda marginata, and Rhabdotis sobrina
- Allogymnopleurus aeneus (dung beetle)
- Trachyderma hispida (nocturnal house beetle)
- Vieta senegalensis (beetle found on grounds of millet fields)
- Epomis croesus (ground beetle)
- Scarites guineensis (ground beetle)
- Crossotus albicollis (longhorn beetle)
- Euryope rubra (orange leaf beetle)
- Phyllognathus burmeisteri (rhinoceros beetle)
- Pogonobasis sp., Thalpophila schweinfurthi, Pimelia grandis, and Zophosis sp.
- Other beetle species: Pseudoprotaetia stolata, Cyaneolytta chopardi, Hycleus affinis, Lydomorphus dusaulti, Zonitoschema gigantea, Apate terebrans, Sinoxylon senegalense, Oplostomus fuligineus, Callosobruchus maculatus, Lanelater notodonta, and Cybister sp.

Diptera (flies)

- Asilidae (robber flies)
- Muscoidea
- Calliphoridae (blowflies)
- cf. Hypoderma sp. (botfly)
- cf. Sarcophaga sp. (flesh fly)
- Actia sp.

True bugs

- cicadas
- Anoplocnemis curvipes: feeds on legumes and flies
- pod-sucking bugs on cowpeas, etc.
- Nariscus sp.: feeds on calabash plants
- Pentatomidae (stink bugs)
- Dysdercus volkeri (cotton-stainer bug)
- Cyclogastridea sp.: a flat green bug in found in Combretum glutinosum tree leaves
- Laccotrephes fabricii, Lethocerus sp.: large "water scorpion" bugs found in pools of water

Bees and wasps

- Oxybelus sp. (digger wasp)
- Chrysididae (cuckoo wasps)
- Delta emarginatum (large mud-dauber wasp); Eumeninae (mason wasps)
- Polistes sp. (paper wasp)
- Belonogaster sp. (paper wasp)

Ants

- Pachycondyla sp. (stinging black ant, very common)
- Camponotus maculatus (yellow honey ant)
- Messor sp. (army ant)
- Camponotus sericeus (black ant)
- Cataglyphis spp.: long-legged and fast-moving, prefer sandy areas
- Dorylus sp. (large army ant)

Grasshoppers

- Chrotogonus senegalensis: small "toad grasshopper"
- Acrida bicolor
- Sherifuria haningtoni: common in rocky areas, eats grasses and grains
- Acorypha glaucopsis: eaten by the Dogon
- Diabolocatantops axillaris: millet pest
- Anacridium melanorhodon: tree locust
- Kraussaria angulifera: millet pest, also eaten by the Dogon
- Cataloipus cymbiferus: large "horse grasshopper"; millet pest
- Kraussella amabile: eaten by the Dogon
- Hieroglyphus daganensis: eaten by the Dogon
- Oedaleus senegalensis: millet pest
- Scintharista notabilis
- Conocephalus conocephalus; other Acrididae species: Acanthacris ruficornis citrina, Acorypha clara, Acrotylus blondeli, Acrotylus patruelis, Aiolopus simulatrix, Cataloipus fuscocoeruleipes, Catantops stramineus, Cryptocatantops haemorrhoidalis, Duronia chloronota, Eurysternacris brevipes, Gastrimargus africanus, Harpezocatantops stylifer, Heteracris annulosa, Heteracris leani, Homoxyrrhepes punctipennis, Humbe tenuicornis, Locusta migratoria, Locustana pardalina, Morphacris fasciata, Nomadacris septemfasciata, Ochrilidia gracilis, Ornithacris cavroisi, Orthacanthacris humilicrus, Oxycatantops spissus, Paracinema tricolor, Schistocerca gregaria, Sphingonotus canariensis orientalis, Trilophidia conturbata, Zacompsa festa; Pyrgomorphidae species: Atractomorpha acutipennis, Poekilocerus bufonius hieroglyphicus, Pyrgomorpha vignaudi

Neuroptera (antlions, etc.)

- Lachlathetes furfuraceus and Creoleon africanus

Mantises (such as Eremiaphila reticulata), earwigs (such as Forficula senegalensis), termites (such as Macrotermes subhyalinus), and many other types of insects are also found in Dogon Country. Lepidopteran species are diverse, including Agrius convolvuli and many pearl millet and sorghum pest species.

Among non-insect arthropods, the scorpions Androctonus amoreuxi (a common house scorpion) and Pandinus imperator (black emperor scorpion, locally called the "horse scorpion"), which are non-insect arthropods, are also common in the region. Spiders include Galeodes olivieri. Ticks include Hyalomma impeltatum and Rhipicephalus turanicus. Millipedes include Archispirostreptus sp., and centipedes include Scolopendra sp.

== Gallery ==
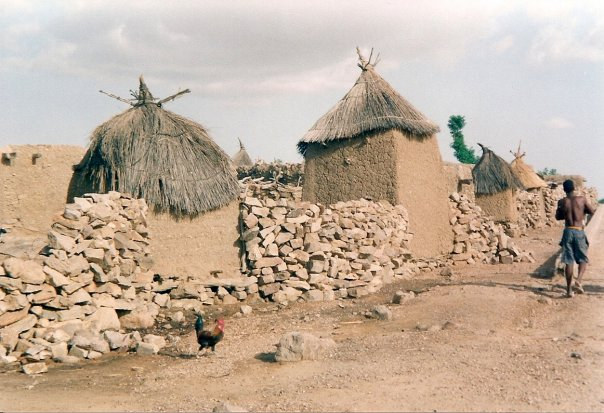
Plateau village

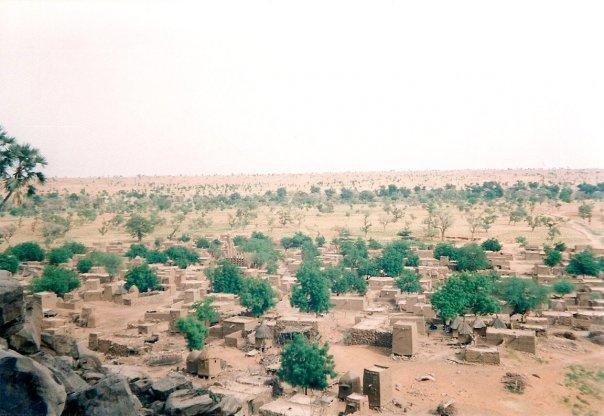
The plain seen from the foot of the cliff

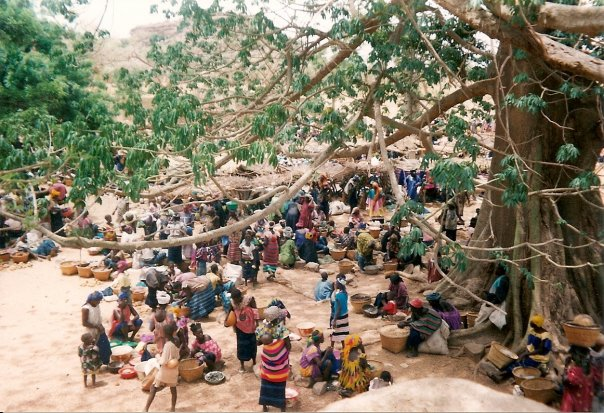
Market in a village at the foot of the cliff

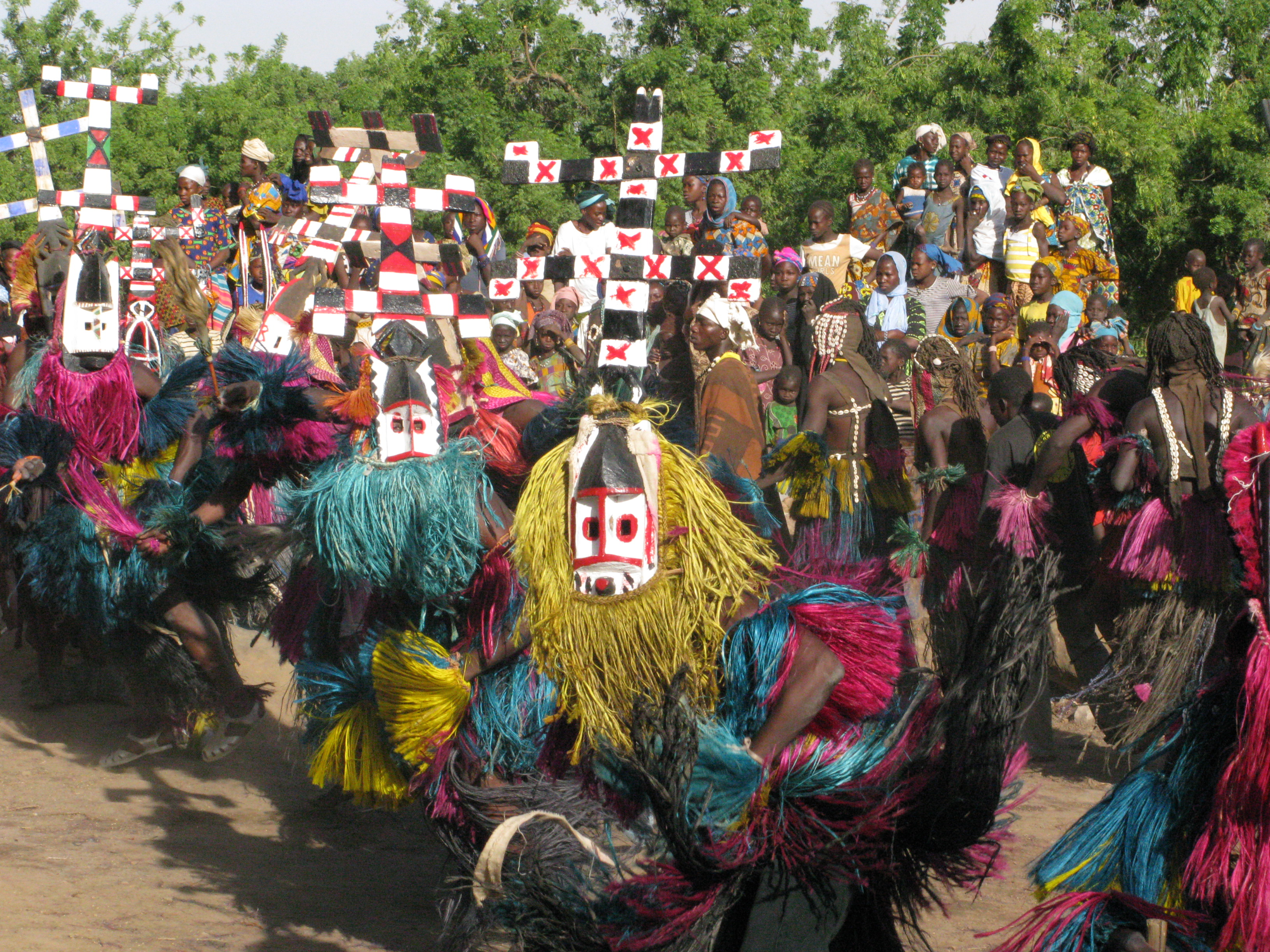
The mask festival

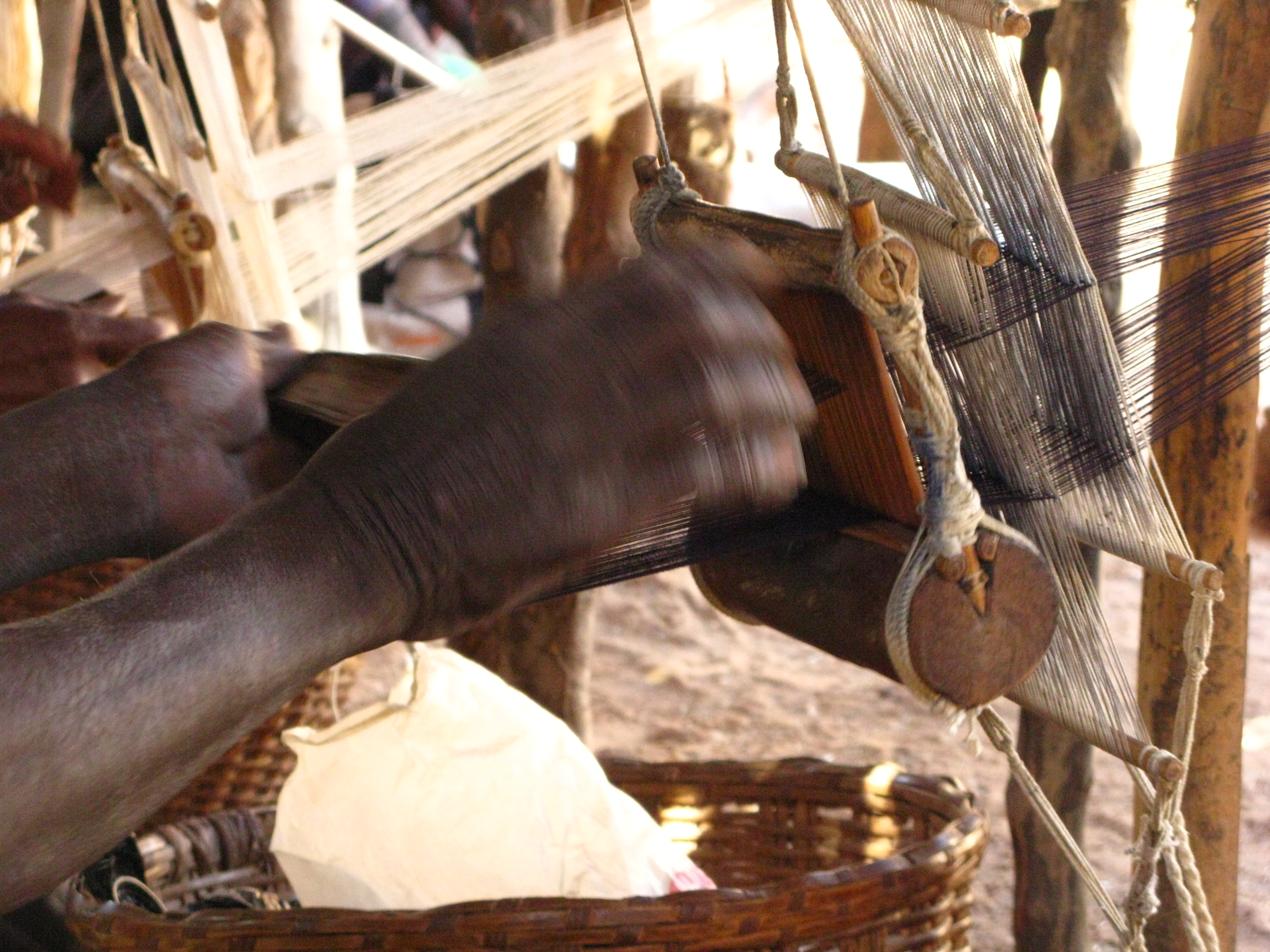
Weaving in Dogon Country

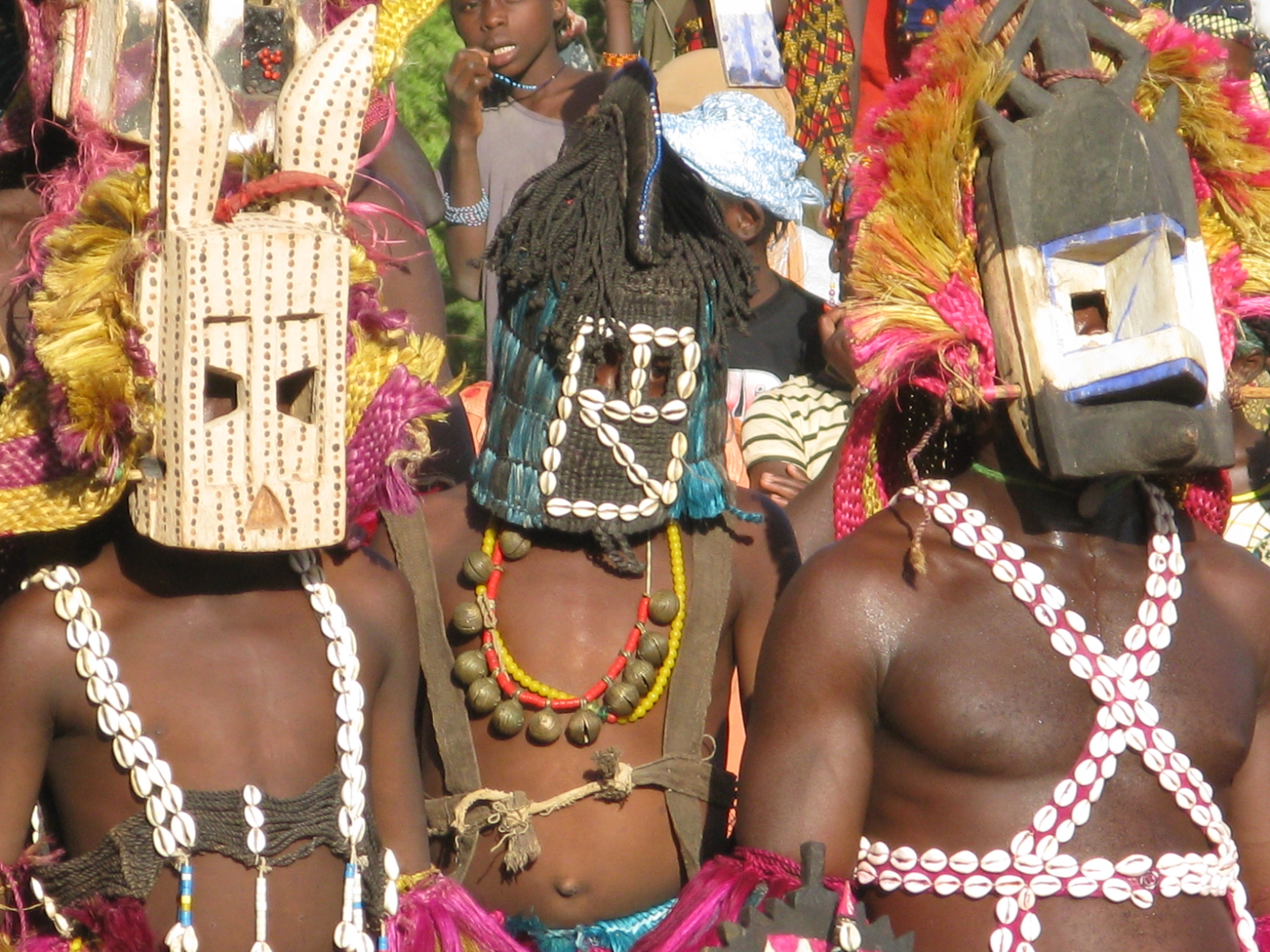
Mask dance

== See also ==
- Mount Hombori
- Sangha, Mali
- Youga Dogorou
