= ISO 639:d =

List of ISO 639-3 language codes starting with D

This is a list of ISO 639-3 language codes starting with D.

Index | a | b | c | d | e | f | g | h | i | j | k | l | m | n | o | p | q | r | s | t | u | v | w | x | y | z

Abbreviations are used in the table as follows:

- Scope: I = individual language, M = macrolanguage, S = special code
- Type: C = constructed, E = extinct (in recent times), H = historical (distinct from its modern form), L = living, S = special code

Deprecated codes are enclosed in (parentheses).

The column Family contains the generic English name of the language's family or macrolanguage.

ISO 639 codes			Scope/Type	Family	Language names	
639-3	639-1	639-2/B	Scope/Type	Family	Native	ISO name
daa			I/L			Dangaléat
dac			I/L			Dambi
dad			I/L			Marik
dae			I/L			Duupa
(daf)			I/L			Dan
dag			I/L			Dagbani
dah			I/L			Gwahatike
dai			I/L			Day
daj			I/L			Dar Fur Daju
dak		dak	I/L		Lakhota	Dakota
dal			I/L			Dahalo
dam			I/L			Damakawa
dan	da	dan	I/L	Indo-European	dansk	Danish
dao			I/L			Daai Chin
(dap)			I/L			Nisi (India)
daq			I/L			Dandami Maria
dar		dar	I/L		дарган	Dargwa
das			I/L			Daho-Doo
(dat)			I/L			Darang Deng
dau			I/L			Dar Sila Daju
dav			I/L			Dawida; Taita
daw			I/L			Davawenyo
dax			I/L			Dayi
daz			I/L	Trans–New Guinea	Moi-Wadea	Moi-Wadea; Dao
dba			I/L	language isolate	Baŋgɛri-mɛ	Bangime
dbb			I/L			Deno
dbd			I/L			Dadiya
dbe			I/L			Dabe
dbf			I/L			Edopi
dbg			I/L			Dogul Dom Dogon
dbi			I/L			Doka
dbj			I/L			Ida'an
dbl			I/L			Dyirbal
dbm			I/L			Duguri
dbn			I/L			Duriankere
dbo			I/L			Dulbu
dbp			I/L			Duwai
dbq			I/L			Daba
dbr			I/L			Dabarre
dbt			I/L			Ben Tey Dogon
dbu			I/L			Bondum Dom Dogon
dbv			I/L			Dungu
dbw			I/L	Niger–Congo?		Bankan Tey Dogon
dby			I/L			Dibiyaso
dcc			I/L			Deccan
dcr			I/E			Negerhollands
dda			I/E			Dadi Dadi
ddd			I/L			Dongotono
dde			I/L			Doondo
ddg			I/L			Fataluku
ddi			I/L			West Goodenough
ddj			I/L			Jaru
ddn			I/L			Dendi (Benin)
ddo			I/L		цез	Dido
ddr			I/E			Dhudhuroa
dds			I/L			Donno So Dogon
ddw			I/L			Dawera-Daweloor
dec			I/L			Dagik
ded			I/L			Dedua
dee			I/L			Dewoin
def			I/L			Dezfuli
deg			I/L			Degema
deh			I/L			Dehwari
dei			I/L			Demisa
(dek)			I/L	spurious language		Dek
del		del	M/L		Lënape	Delaware
dem			I/L			Dem
den		den	M/L			Slave (Athapascan)
dep			I/E			Pidgin Delaware
deq			I/L			Dendi (Central African Republic)
der			I/L	Sino-Tibetan	জিমʼচাঁয়া	Deori
des			I/L			Desano
deu	de	ger	I/L	Indo-European	Deutsch	German
dev			I/L			Domung
dez			I/L			Dengese
dga			I/L			Southern Dagaare
dgb			I/L	Niger–Congo?	Bunɔɡɛ	Bunoge Dogon
dgc			I/L			Casiguran Dumagat Agta
dgd			I/L			Dagaari Dioula
dge			I/L			Degenan
dgg			I/L			Doga
dgh			I/L			Dghwede
dgi			I/L			Northern Dagara
dgk			I/L			Dagba
dgl			I/L			Andaandi; Dongolawi
dgn			I/E			Dagoman
dgo			I/L			Dogri (individual language)
dgr		dgr	I/L	Dené–Yeniseian?	Tłı̨chǫ Yatıì	Tlicho; Dogrib
dgs			I/L			Dogoso
dgt			I/E			Ndra'ngith
(dgu)			I/L	spurious language		Degaru
dgw			I/E			Daungwurrung
dgx			I/L			Doghoro
dgz			I/L			Daga
(dha)			I/L			Dhanwar (India)
dhd			I/L			Dhundari
dhg			I/L			Dhangu; Dhangu-Djangu; Djangu
dhi			I/L			Dhimal
dhl			I/L			Dhalandji
dhm			I/L			Zemba
dhn			I/L			Dhanki
dho			I/L			Dhodia
dhr			I/L			Dhargari
dhs			I/L			Dhaiso
dhu			I/E			Dhurga
dhv			I/L		drehu	Dehu; Drehu
dhw			I/L			Dhanwar (Nepal)
dhx			I/L			Dhungaloo
dia			I/L			Dia
dib			I/L			South Central Dinka
dic			I/L			Lakota Dida
did			I/L			Didinga
dif			I/E			Dieri; Diyari
dig			I/L			Chidigo; Digo
dih			I/L		K'miai	Kumiai
dii			I/L			Dimbong
dij			I/L			Dai
dik			I/L			Southwestern Dinka
dil			I/L			Dilling
dim			I/L			Dime
din		din	M/L		Thuɔŋjäŋ	Dinka
dio			I/L			Dibo
dip			I/L			Northeastern Dinka
diq			I/L			Dimli (individual language)
dir			I/L			Dirim
dis			I/L			Dimasa
(dit)			I/E			Dirari
diu			I/L			Diriku
div	dv	div	I/L	Indo-European	ދިވެހި	Dhivehi; Divehi; Maldivian
diw			I/L			Northwestern Dinka
dix			I/L			Dixon Reef
diy			I/L			Diuwe
diz			I/L			Ding
dja			I/E			Djadjawurrung
djb			I/L			Djinba
djc			I/L			Dar Daju Daju
djd			I/L			Djamindjung; Ngaliwurru
dje			I/L		zarmaciine	Zarma
djf			I/E			Djangun
dji			I/L			Djinang
djj			I/L			Djeebbana
djk			I/L			Businenge Tongo; Eastern Maroon Creole; Nenge
(djl)			I/E			Djiwarli
djm			I/L			Jamsay Dogon
djn			I/L			Djauan; Jawoyn
djo			I/L			Jangkang
djr			I/L			Djambarrpuyngu
dju			I/L			Kapriman
djw			I/E			Djawi
dka			I/L	Sino-Tibetan	དག་པ་ཁ་	Dakpakha
dkg			I/L	Niger–Congo		Kadung
dkk			I/L			Dakka
(dkl)			I/L			Kolum So Dogon
dkr			I/L			Kuijau
dks			I/L			Southeastern Dinka
dkx			I/L			Mazagway
dlg			I/L		Дулҕан	Dolgan
dlk			I/L			Dahalik
dlm			I/E			Dalmatian
dln			I/L			Darlong
dma			I/L			Duma
dmb			I/L			Mombo Dogon
dmc			I/L			Gavak
dmd			I/E			Madhi Madhi
dme			I/L			Dugwor
dmf			I/E			Medefaidrin
dmg			I/L			Upper Kinabatangan
dmk			I/L			Domaaki
dml			I/L			Dameli
dmm			I/L			Dama
dmo			I/L			Kemedzung
dmr			I/L			East Damar
dms			I/L			Dampelas
dmu			I/L			Dubu; Tebi
dmv			I/L			Dumpas
dmw			I/L			Mudburra
dmx			I/L			Dema
dmy			I/L			Demta; Sowari
dna			I/L			Upper Grand Valley Dani
dnd			I/L			Daonda
dne			I/L			Ndendeule
dng			I/L	Sino-Tibetan	Хуэйзў йүян (Huejzw jyian)	Dungan
dni			I/L			Lower Grand Valley Dani
dnj			I/L			Dan
dnk			I/L			Dengka
dnn			I/L			Dzùùngoo
dno			I/L	Nilo-Saharan		Ndrulo; Northern Lendu
dnr			I/L			Danaru
dnt			I/L			Mid Grand Valley Dani
dnu			I/L			Danau
dnv			I/L			Danu
dnw			I/L			Western Dani
dny			I/L			Dení
doa			I/L			Dom
dob			I/L			Dobu
doc			I/L			Northern Dong
doe			I/L			Doe
dof			I/L			Domu
doh			I/L		leec Gaeml	Dong
doi		doi	M/L		डोगरी	Dogri (macrolanguage)
dok			I/L			Dondo
dol			I/L			Doso
don			I/L			Toura (Papua New Guinea)
doo			I/L			Dongo
dop			I/L			Lukpa
doq			I/L			Dominican Sign Language
dor			I/L			Dori'o
dos			I/L			Dogosé
dot			I/L			Dass
dov			I/L			Dombe
dow			I/L			Doyayo
dox			I/L			Bussa
doy			I/L			Dompo
doz			I/L			Dorze
dpp			I/L			Papar
drb			I/L			Dair
drc			I/L			Minderico
drd			I/L			Darmiya
dre			I/L			Dolpo
drg			I/L			Rungus
(drh)			I/L			Darkhat
dri			I/L			C'Lela
drl			I/L			Paakantyi
drn			I/L			West Damar
dro			I/L			Daro-Matu Melanau
drq			I/E	Sino-Tibetan		Dura
(drr)			I/E			Dororo
drs			I/L			Gedeo
drt			I/L			Drents
dru			I/L			Rukai
(drw)			I/L			Darwazi
dry			I/L			Darai
dsb		dsb	I/L		dolnoserbski	Lower Sorbian
dse			I/L			Dutch Sign Language
dsh			I/L			Daasanach
dsi			I/L			Disa
dsk			I/L	Afro-Asiatic		Dokshi
dsl			I/L			Danish Sign Language
dsn			I/E			Dusner
dso			I/L	Indo-European	ଦେଶିଆ	Desiya
dsq			I/L			Tadaksahak
dsz			I/L			Mardin Sign Language
dta			I/L			Daur
dtb			I/L			Labuk-Kinabatangan Kadazan
dtd			I/L			Ditidaht
dth			I/E			Adithinngithigh
dti			I/L	Niger–Congo?	Ana Tiŋa	Ana Tinga Dogon
dtk			I/L			Tene Kan Dogon
dtm			I/L			Tomo Kan Dogon
dtn			I/L			Daatsʼíin
dto			I/L			Tommo So Dogon
dtp			I/L			Central Dusun; Kadazan Dusun
dtr			I/L			Lotud
dts			I/L			Toro So Dogon
dtt			I/L			Toro Tegu Dogon
dtu			I/L	Niger–Congo?	Tebul Ure	Tebul Ure Dogon
dty			I/L			Dotyali
dua		dua	I/L		Duala	Duala
dub			I/L			Dubli
duc			I/L			Duna
(dud)			I/L			Hun-Saare
due			I/L			Umiray Dumaget Agta
duf			I/L			Drubea; Dumbea
dug			I/L			Chiduruma; Duruma
duh			I/L			Dungra Bhil
dui			I/L			Dumun
(duj)			I/L			Dhuwal
duk			I/L			Uyajitaya
dul			I/L			Alabat Island Agta
dum		dum	I/H			Middle Dutch (ca. 1050-1350)
dun			I/L			Dusun Deyah
duo			I/L			Dupaninan Agta
dup			I/L	Austronesian		Duano
duq			I/L			Dusun Malang
dur			I/L			Dii
dus			I/L			Dumi
duu			I/L	Sino-Tibetan	Tvrung kvt	Drung
duv			I/L			Duvle
duw			I/L			Dusun Witu
dux			I/L			Duungooma
duy			I/E			Dicamay Agta
duz			I/E			Duli-Gey
dva			I/L			Duau
dwa			I/L			Diri
dwk			I/L			Dawik Kui
(dwl)			I/L			Walo Kumbe Dogon
dwr			I/L			Dawro
dws			I/C			Dutton World Speedwords
dwu			I/L	Pama–Nyungan		Dhuwal
dww			I/L	Austronesian		Dawawa
dwy			I/L	Pama–Nyungan		Dhuwaya
dwz			I/L	Indo-European		Dewas Rai
dya			I/L			Dyan
dyb			I/E			Dyaberdyaber
dyd			I/E			Dyugun
dyg			I/E			Villa Viciosa Agta
dyi			I/L			Djimini Senoufo
(dyk)			I/L	spurious language		Land Dayak
dyl			I/L	unclassified		Bhutanese Sign Language
dym			I/L			Yanda Dom Dogon
dyn			I/L			Dhanggatti; Dyangadi
dyo			I/L			Jola-Fonyi
dyr			I/L	Afro-Asiatic		Dyarim
dyu		dyu	I/L		Julakan	Dyula
dyy			I/L			Djabugay; Dyaabugay
dza			I/L	Niger–Congo?	Duguza	Tunzu
dzd			I/L	Afro-Asiatic	Dazawa	Daza
dze			I/E			Djiwarli
dzg			I/L			Dazaga
dzl			I/L			Dzalakha
dzn			I/L			Dzando
dzo	dz	dzo	I/L	Sino-Tibetan	རྫོང་ཁ	Dzongkha

== Sources ==
- "ISO 639-2 Registration Authority". Library of Congress.
- "ISO 639-3 Registration Authority". SIL International.
- Lewis, M. Paul; Simons, Gary F.; Fennig, Charles D., eds. (2016). "Ethnologue: Languages of the World" (19th ed.). Dallas, Texas: SIL International.
