= Jeffrey Heath (linguist) =

American linguist

Jeffrey Heath (born November 29, 1949) is an American field linguist and historical linguist, whose scholarship has had a major influence on African, and Australian linguistics. He is Professor of Linguistics and Middle East Studies at the University of Michigan, US. He is especially known for his extensive documentation of endangered languages in West Africa and Indigenous Australia, as well as for his detailed grammatical studies of the Dogon and Songhay language families of Mali.

== Biography ==
Heath was born in Exeter, New Hampshire, in the United States. He attended Harvard University, where he studied linguistics and Arabic, graduating summa cum laude with an A.B. degree in 1971. His undergraduate studies reflected an early interest in non-Western languages, comparative linguistics, and the relationship between language and culture.

He subsequently pursued graduate studies at the University of Chicago, earning a Ph.D. in Linguistics in 1976. His doctoral training combined theoretical linguistics with empirical language documentation, an interdisciplinary approach that became central to his later work. During these years, Heath developed interests in language contact, morphology, syntax, and field-based linguistic research.

== Career ==
=== Early fieldwork ===
Soon after beginning his graduate studies, Heath undertook extensive fieldwork in Australia through a research fellowship with the Australian Institute of Aboriginal Studies, where he worked from 1973 to 1977. His research focused on Indigenous Australian languages, many of which were endangered or had limited prior documentation.

This early fieldwork established Heath’s reputation as a linguist capable of producing detailed grammatical analyses based on primary field data. His experience in Australia shaped his methodological approach throughout his career, particularly his emphasis on long-term engagement with language communities, direct elicitation, oral texts, and comparative linguistic analysis.

=== Academic career ===
Heath began his academic teaching career at Harvard University, where he served as Assistant Professor of Linguistics from 1977 to 1982 and Associate Professor from 1982 to 1985. During this period, he expanded his research in Arabic dialectology and African linguistics while developing courses in syntax, language contact, and linguistic typology.

In 1985 and 1986, Heath taught in the Department of English at King Faisal University. His time in Saudi Arabia deepened his engagement with Arabic dialect studies and sociolinguistic variation in the Middle East and North Africa.

In 1987, Heath joined the University of Michigan as Visiting Associate Professor of Linguistics before becoming Professor of Linguistics in 1989. In 1999, he also received an appointment as Professor of Near Eastern Studies (now Middle East Studies). At Michigan, Heath became one of the university’s leading scholars in African and descriptive linguistics.

He additionally held several administrative positions, including Associate Director of the Linguistics Program from 1989 to 1994 and Acting Director during the 1991–1992 academic year.

== Research ==
=== African Linguistics ===
Heath is best known for his field research in West Africa, particularly in Mali, Niger, Burkina Faso, and neighboring regions. His work focused on documenting endangered and understudied languages through detailed grammars, dictionaries, and oral text collections.

His scholarship emphasized descriptive linguistics, historical reconstruction, language contact, morphology, syntax, and ethnolinguistics. Heath frequently combined linguistic fieldwork with anthropological and historical perspectives, examining how migration, trade, religion, and cultural exchange shaped linguistic development across the Sahel and West Africa.

Many of the languages Heath studied had little or no prior documentation. His research therefore became critically important not only for theoretical linguistics but also for language preservation and cultural heritage.

=== Dogon Language Documentation ===
Heath became internationally recognized for his groundbreaking work on the Dogon language family of Mali. Beginning in the early 2000s, he launched a large-scale documentation project that fundamentally transformed scholarly understanding of Dogon linguistic diversity.

Prior to Heath’s work, many Dogon varieties had been treated as dialects of a single language. Through extensive field research, Heath demonstrated that the Dogon family contained a much larger number of distinct languages with complex historical relationships.

Supported by grants from the National Science Foundation and the National Endowment for the Humanities, Heath produced an extraordinary series of grammatical descriptions documenting Dogon languages including Jamsay, Tiranige, Toro Tegu, Togo Kan, Tebul Ure, Yanda Dom, Penange, Dogul Dom, Najamba, and several others.

His Grammar of Jamsay (2008), published by Mouton de Gruyter, became one of the most detailed grammatical studies ever produced on an African language. The work was praised for its comprehensive treatment of phonology, morphology, syntax, discourse structure, and oral traditions.

Many of Heath’s later Dogon grammars were published electronically through the Language Description Heritage Library associated with the Max Planck Institute for Evolutionary Anthropology.

=== Songhay and Sahelian Studies ===
In addition to his Dogon research, Heath has made major contributions to the study of the Songhay language family, spoken across large parts of the Sahel. Heath’s broader research on Sahelian linguistic interaction examined contact among Songhay, Arabic, Berber, Dogon, and Mande-speaking populations. His scholarship contributed significantly to understanding long-term patterns of multilingualism and cultural exchange in West Africa.

His grammars and dictionaries of Songhay languages became standard reference works within African linguistics. Among his major publications were studies of Humburi Senni, Tondi Songway Kiini, and Koyraboro Senni.

=== Arabic Dialectology and Language Contact ===
Earlier in his career, Heath conducted important studies on Moroccan Arabic and Judeo-Arabic dialects. His research explored code-switching, bilingualism, phonological variation, and language mixing within multilingual North African societies. His work on Moroccan Arabic contributed to broader discussions of language contact and sociolinguistic interaction among Arabic, Berber, French, and Jewish communities. Heath’s scholarship in Arabic dialectology reflected his wider interest in how languages influence one another through sustained cultural contact.

He became a charter member of the Association Internationale de Dialectologie Arabe and remained active in Arabic linguistics throughout much of his career.

== Awards and honors ==
In 2011–2012, Heath received a Guggenheim Fellowship recognizing his contributions to African linguistics and language documentation. He also held an Alexander von Humboldt Fellowship in Germany and conducted research at the Max Planck Institute for Evolutionary Anthropology.

In 2019, Heath served as a Fulbright Specialist at Cheikh Anta Diop University, where he lectured on linguistic, historical, and anthropological interactions across North and West Africa.

== Publications ==
- Linguistic Diffusion in Arnhem Land. Canberra: AIAS, pp. 146, 1978.
- Ngandi Grammar, Texts, and Dictionary. Canberra: AIAS, pp. 297, 1978.
- Basic Materials in Ritharngu: Grammar, Texts, and Dictionary. Pacific Linguistics B-62. Canberra: Australian National University, pp. 249, 1980.
- Basic Materials in Warndarang: Grammar, Texts, and Dictionary. Pacific Linguistics, C-60. Canberra: Australian National University, pp. 174, 1980.
- Nunggubuyu Myths and Ethnographic Texts. Canberra: AIAS, pp. 556, 1980.
- Dhuwal (Arnhem Land) Texts on Kinship and Other Subjects, with Grammatical Sketch and Dictionary. Oceana Linguistic Monographs, 23. Sydney: University of Sydney, pp. 241, 1980
- Basic Materials in Mara: Grammar, Texts, and Dictionary. Pacific Linguistics C-60. Canberra: Australian National University, pp. 522, 1981.
- Nunggubuyu Dictionary. Canberra: AIAS, pp. 399, 1982
- Functional Grammar of Nunggubuyu. Canberra: Australian Institute of Aboriginal Studies, pp. 664, 1984.
- Ablaut and Ambiguity: Phonology of a Moroccan Arabic Dialect. Albany: State University of New York Press, pp. 366, 1987.
- Texts in Koroboro Senni, Songhay of Gao, Mali. (Wortkunst und Dokumentartexte in afrikanischen Sprachen, 6) Cologne: Rüdiger Köppe Verlag, pp. viii, 283, 1988 (facing English translations; material from Gao and Bamba).
- From Code-Switching to Borrowing: A Case Study of Moroccan Arabic. (Library of Arabic Linguistics, 9) London and New York: Kegan Paul International, pp. 328, 1989.
- Dictionnaire Songhay-Anglais-Français. Paris: l'Harmattan. Vol. 1: Koyra Chiini, pp. 264. Vol. 2: Djenne Chiini, pp. 202. vol. 3: Koroboro Senni, pp. 344. 1998.
- Texts in Koyra Chiini, Songhay of Timbuktu, Mali. (Wortkunst und Dokumentartexte in afrikanischen Sprachen, 5) Cologne: Rüdiger Köppe Verlag, pp. 389, 1998 (facing English translations; material from Gao and Bamba).
- A Grammar of Koyra Chiini, the Songhay of Timbuktu. (Mouton Grammar Library.) Berlin/New York: Mouton de Gruyter, pp. xv, 453, 1998.
- Grammar of Koyraboro (Koroboro) Senni, the Songhay of Gao. Cologne: Rüdiger Köppe Verlag, pp. 403, 1999.
- Jewish and Muslim Dialects of Moroccan Arabic. London: Curzon, pp. 559, 2002.
- Hassaniya Arabic (Mali) Poetic and Ethnographic Texts. Wiesbaden: Harrassowitz, pp. 207, 2003.
- Hassaniya Arabic (Mali) - French - English Dictionary. Wiesbaden: Harrassowitz, pp. 338, 2004.
- Tondi Songway Kiini (montane Songhay, Mali): Reference grammar and TSK-English-French Dictionary. CSLI [distributed by University of Chicago Press], pp. 440, 2005.
- A Grammar of Tamashek (Tuareg of Mali). (Mouton Grammar Library.) Berlin/New York: Mouton de Gruyter, pp. 745, 2005.
- Tamashek Texts from Timbuktu and Kidal. (Berber Linguistics Series.) Cologne: Koeppe Verlag, pp. 164, 2005.
- Dictionnaire tamachek - anglais - francais. Paris: Karthala, pp. 848, 2006.
- A Grammar of Jamsay. (Mouton Grammar Library.) Berlin/New York: Mouton de Gruyter, pp. 735, 2008.
