= Escarpment Dogon =

Dogon dialect

- Native to: Mali
- Region: Bandiagara Escarpment
- Native speakers: (160,000 cited 1998)
- Language family: Niger–Congo?: Dogon; Escarpment Dogon
- Standard forms: Tɔrɔ sɔɔ
- Dialects: Tɔrɔ sɔɔ; Tɔmmɔ sɔɔ; Donno sɔ; Kamma sɔ; Yɔrnɔ sɔ

Official status
- Official language in: Mali

Language codes
- ISO 639-3: Variously: dts – Tɔrɔ sɔɔ dds – Donno sɔ dto – Tɔmmɔ sɔ
- Glottolog: esca1235

Escarpment Dogon is a continuum of Dogon dialects of the Bandiagara Escarpment, including the standard language. There are three principal dialects:

- Toro So Tɔrɔ sɔɔ, called Bomu Tegu in the plains languages and also known as Dɔgɔsɔ, is the standard variety of Dogon, which is one of thirteen official languages of Mali.
- Tommo So Tɔmmɔ sɔ, called Tombo so by Bondum Dom speakers, is spoken in a region from Kasa to Bandiagara. It is more linguistically conservative than Toro So.

The third dialect commonly listed is two subdialects without a common name:

- Donno So Donno sɔ in the Bandiagara area, and
- Kamma So Kamma sɔ also known as Kamba So, in the Kamba area.

Hochstetler confirms that these are intelligible with each other, but not with the more populous varieties of Dogon on the neighboring plains.

While Toro So was chosen as the official standard, because it has the most in common with the largest number of Dogon languages due to its central location, and is used in educational and official contexts, Jamsay Dogon is the prestige variety and is the variety used for radio broadcasts.

== Phonology ==
=== Consonants ===
Yorno-So Consonants
		Labial	Alveolar	Palatal	Velar	Glottal
Stop/ Affricate	voiceless	p	t	t͡ʃ	k	(ʔ)
Stop/ Affricate	voiced	b	d	d͡ʒ	g	
Fricative	voiceless	(f)	s	(ʃ)		(h)
Fricative	voiced		(z)		(ɣ)	
Nasal		m	n	ɲ	ŋ	
Lateral			l			
Tap	central		ɾ			
Tap	nasal		ɾ̃			
Approximant	central	w		j		
Approximant	nasal	w̃		j̃		

- /t͡ʃ/ occurs, but only marginally.
- /ɡ/ can be realized as a fricative [ɣ] between vowel sounds /a ɔ/.
- /f z h ʔ/ can only occur among loanwords.
- /ʃ/ might occur as an allophone of /s/ when preceding /i/.

=== Vowels ===
	Oral		Nasal	
	Front	Back	Front	Back
Close	i iː	u uː	ĩ ĩː	ũ ũː
Close-mid	e eː	o oː		
Open-mid	ɛ ɛː	ɔ ɔː	ɛ̃ ɛ̃ː	ɔ̃ ɔ̃ː
Open	a aː		ã ãː	

== Tommo So ==
Tommo So (a bipartite name for the language signifying the ethnicity or the location of the speakers, 'Tommo' and a word for language, 'So') is part of the Dogon language family comprising around twenty languages. The genetic relations of the languages of the Dogon country are complex, as geographical proximity does not necessarily involve genetic relation. "Despite the fact that Tommo So and Dogulu Dom are both spoken in the central area of Dogon country, the preliminary results of our current fieldwork suggest that Tommo So bears a closer relation to Najamba or Donno So."

=== Geographic distribution ===
Tommo sɔ is thought to be spoken on the plateau between Douentza and Bandiagara by an estimated 40,000–60,000 people. In terms of neighboring languages, Tommo so is bordered by Najamba-Kidinge to the northwest, by Nanga and Jamsay to the east, by Tiranige Diga to the west, and by Donno So and Dogulu Dom to the south. Some dialects of Tommo So and Donno So are mutually intelligible. Donno So, based on fieldwork data, resembles an intermediate step between Tommo So and Toro So.
