= Languages of Mali =

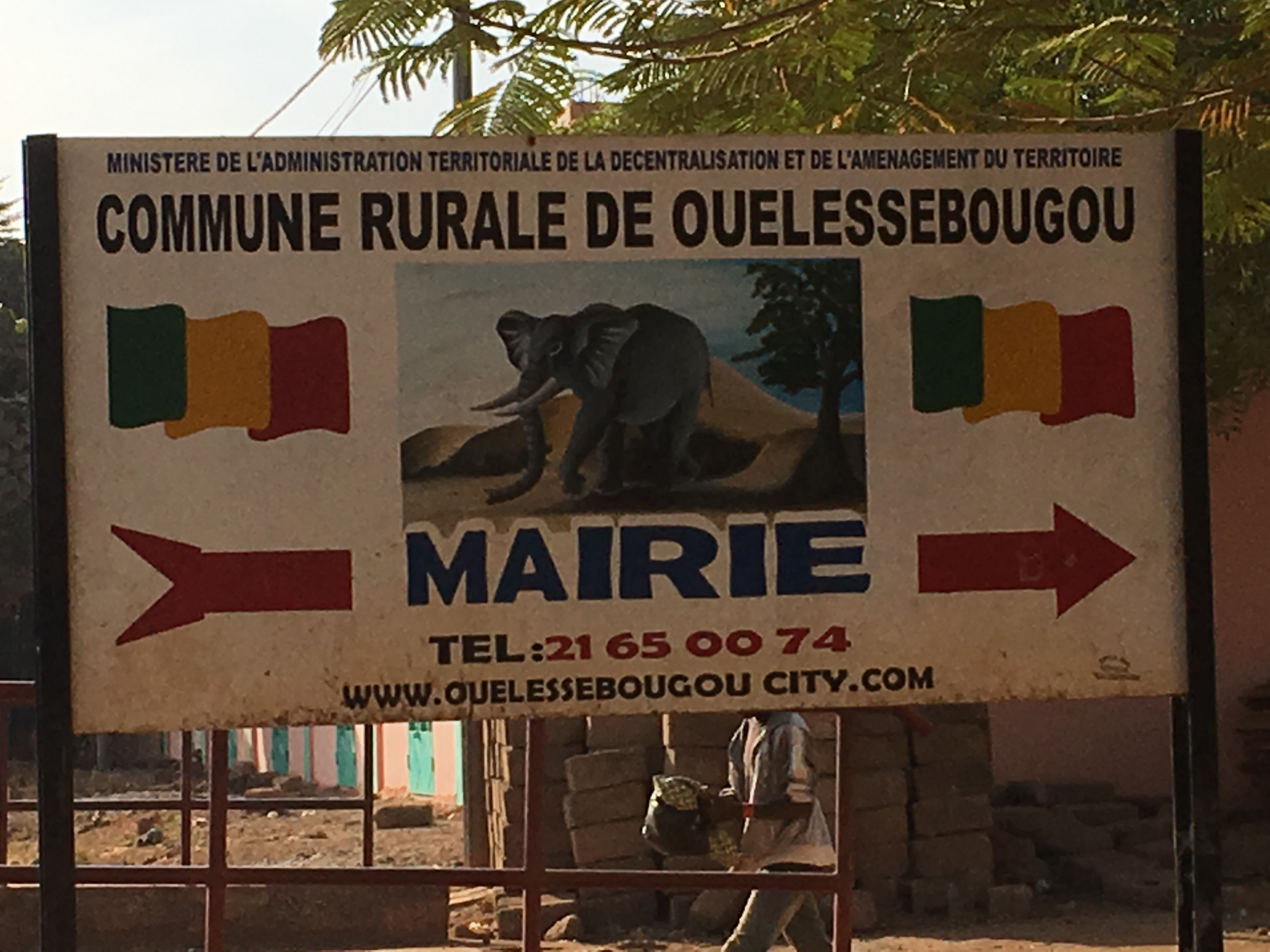
- Sign in French at Ouélessébougou town hall
- Official: "All national languages" (Note: The 2023 constitution of Mali, adopted under President Assimi Goita, removed French as the country's sole official language and mentions "all national languages of Mali" would serve as official languages of the country while not naming any of those languages. The Bambara language practically serves as the country's lingua franca since Goita's rule. 80% of the country speaks Bambara.)
- Semi-official: African French (working language)
- Indigenous: Bambara, Bomu, Bozo, Mamara, Maninkakan, Soninke, Songhay, Syenara, Tamasheq, Xaasongaxango
- Signed: Francophone African Sign Language
- Keyboard layout: French AZERTY

Mali is a multilingual country of about 21.9 million people. The languages spoken there reflect ancient settlement patterns, migrations, and its long history. Ethnologue counts more than 80 languages. The 2023 Mali constitution declares "all national languages" to be official languages without naming those languages. The Bambara language practically serves as the country's lingua franca as 80% of the country speaks the Bambara language.

French is the working language. In 2024, the Francophone population of Mali represents 20%, which is approximately 4,884,000 people. Among them, 6.4% (around 1,491,000 individuals) speak French as their first language. Additionally, approximately 3,329,144 people, or 13.6% of the total population of 24,479,000, use French as a second language.

== Language usage ==
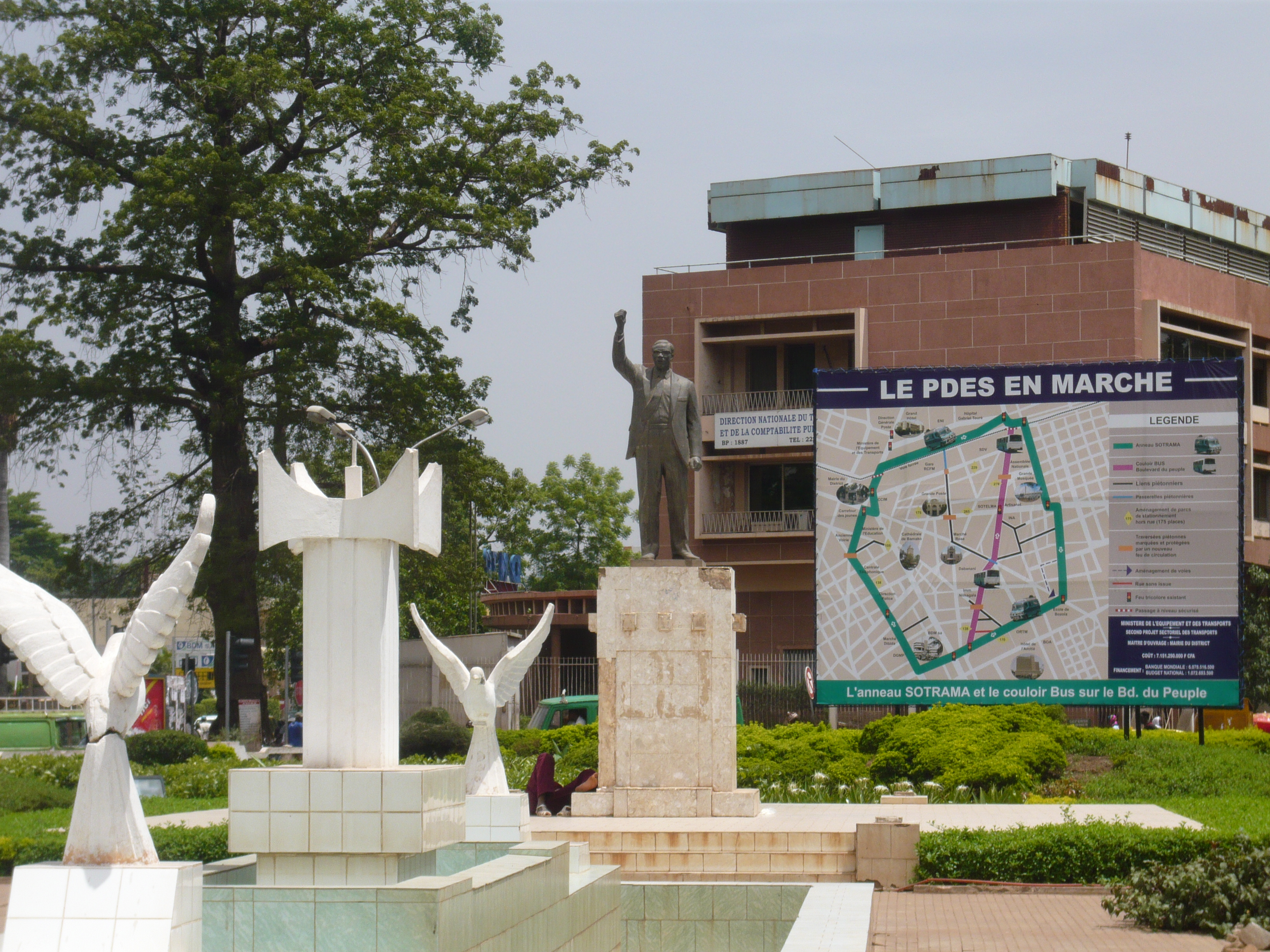
A sign in French at a monument in Bamako.

French was retained as the official language at independence until 2023. As a working language, it is used in government and formal education. Estimates of the number of Malians who actually speak French are low, and almost all of them speak French as a second language. 1993 estimates are that there were only around 9,000 Malian speakers of French as a first language.

Derived from the numbers of school attendees, it was estimated in 1986 that roughly 21% of the population spoke French, a number considerably lower than those who speak Bambara. French is more understood in urban centres, with 1976 figures showing a 36.7% "Francophone" rate in urban areas, but only an 8.2% rate in rural areas. French usage is gender weighted as well, with 1984 figures showing 17.5% percent of males speaking French, but only 4.9% of women.

Bambara (Bambara: Bamanankan), a Manding language (in the Mande family) is said to be spoken by 80% of the population as a first or second language. It is spoken mainly in central and Southern Mali. Bambara and two other very closely related Manding languages Malinke or Maninkakan in the southwest and Kassonke (in the region of Kayes in the west), are among the 13 national languages. It is used as a trade language in Mali between language groups.

Bambara is also very close to the Dyula language (Dyula: Jula or Julakan; French: Dioula), spoken mainly in Côte d'Ivoire and Burkina Faso. The name "Jula" is actually a Manding word meaning "trader."

Other Mande languages (not in the Manding group) include Soninke (in the region of Kayes in western Mali) and the Bozo languages (along the middle Niger).

Other languages include Senufo in the Sikasso region (south), Fula (Fula: Fulfulde; French: Peul) as a widespread trade language in the Mopti region and beyond, the Songhay languages along the Niger, the Dogon languages of Pays Dogon or “Dogon country” in central Mali, Tamasheq in the eastern part of Mali's Sahara and Arabic in its western part.

Thirteen of the most widely spoken indigenous languages are considered "national languages."

Most formal education for the deaf in Mali uses American Sign Language, introduced to West Africa by the deaf American missionary Andrew Foster. There are two other sign languages in Mali. One, Tebul Sign Language, is found in a village with a high incidence of congenital deafness. Another, Bamako Sign Language, developed in the after-work tea circles of the cities; it is threatened by the educational use of ASL.

== Language descriptions ==
Most of the languages of Mali are among the Mande languages. The Mande family is traditionally counted as a branch of Niger–Congo, Africa's largest language family, though this view has been questioned. Non-Mande languages include the Dogon languages, perhaps another Niger–Congo branch, and the Senufo languages, which are unquestionably part of that family.

Mande, Senufo, and Dogon stand out among Niger–Congo because of their divergent SOV basic word order. The Gur languages are represented by Bomu on the Bani River of Mali and Burkina Faso. Fulfulde, spoken throughout West Africa, is a member of the Senegambian branch.

Other language families include Afro-Asiatic, represented by the Berber language Tamasheq and by Arabic, and the Songhay languages, which have traditionally been classified as Nilo-Saharan but may constitute an independent language family.

=== Spoken languages ===
Languages of Mali (2009)
| Languages | percent |
| Bambara | 30.3% |
| Fula | 25.4% |
| Dogon | 7.2% |
| French | 6.4% |
| Soninke | 6.4% |
| Other | 6.3% |
| Malinke | 5.6% |
| Djerma | 5.6% |
| Minianka | 4.3% |
| Tuareg | 3.5% |
| Bobo | 2.1% |
| Unspecified | 0.7% |

The following table gives a summary of the 63 spoken languages reported by Ethnologue (there are also 3 sign languages):

| Language (Ethnologue) | Cluster | Language family | Legal status | L1 speakers in Mali* | L2 speakers in Mali** | Main region |
|---|---|---|---|---|---|---|
| Hassaniya Arabic | Arabic | Afro-Asiatic: Semitic | Official | 106,000 | ? | NW |
| Bambara, Bamanankan | Manding | Mande | Official | 4,000,000 | 10,000,000 | All |
| Bomu | | Niger–Congo / Gur | Official | 102,000 | ? | SE |
| Bozo, Tiéyaxo | Bozo | Mande | Official | 118,000 | ? | Central |
| Dogon, Toro So | Dogon | | Official | 50,000 | ? | Central-east |
| Fulfulde, Maasina | Fula | Niger–Congo / Senegambian | Official | 1,000,000 | ? (some L2 speakers) | Central |
| Maninkakan, Kita | Manding | Mande | Official | 434,000 | ? | W |
| Senoufo, Mamara (Miniyanka) | Senufo | Niger–Congo | Official | 738,000 | ? | S |
| Senoufo, Syenara | Senufo | Niger–Congo | Official | 155,000 | ? | S |
| Songhay, Koyraboro Senni | Songhay (Southern) | | Official | 430,000 | ? (a trade language) | N |
| Soninke (& Marka/Maraka) | | Mande | Official | 1,280,000 | ? | NW |
| Tamasheq | Tamashek | Afro-Asiatic / Berber | Official | 250,000 | ? | N |
| Xaasongaxango, Khassonke | Manding | Mande | Official | 700,000 | ? | NW |
| Bankagooma | | Mande | None? | 6,000 | ? | S |
| Bobo Madaré, Northern | | Mande | None? | 18,400 | ? | SE |
| Bozo, Hainyaxo | Bozo | Mande | None? | 30,000 | ? | Central |
| Bozo, Jenaama | Bozo | Mande | None? | 197,000 | ? | Central |
| Bozo, Tièma Cièwè | Bozo | Mande | None? | 2,500 | ? | Central |
| Bangerime | Dogon? | | None? | 2,000 | ? | Central-east |
| Dogon, Ampari | Dogon | | None? | 5,200 | ? | Central-east |
| Dogon, Ana Tinga | Dogon | | None? | 500 | ? | Central-east |
| Dogon, Bankan Tey | Dogon | | None? | 1,320 | ? | Central-east |
| Dogon, Ben Tey | Dogon | | None? | 3,000 | ? | Central-east |
| Dogon, Bondum Dom | Dogon | | None? | 24,700 | ? | Central-east |
| Dogon, Bunoge | Dogon | | None? | 1,000 | ? | Central-east |
| Dogon, Dogul Dom | Dogon | | None? | 15,700 | ? | Central-east |
| Dogon, Donno So | Dogon | | None? | 45,300 | ? | Central-east |
| Dogon, Jamsay | Dogon | | None? | 130,000 | ? | Central-east |
| Dogon, Kolum So | Dogon | | None? | 19,000 | ? | Central-east |
| Dogon, Nanga Dama | Dogon | | None? | 3,000 | ? | Central-east |
| Dogon, Tebul Ure | Dogon | | None? | 3,000 | ? | Central-east |
| Dogon, Tene Kan | Dogon | | None? | 127,000 | ? | Central-east |
| Dogon, Tiranige Diga | Dogon | | None? | 4,200 | ? | Central-east |
| Dogon, Tommo So | Dogon | | None? | 60,000 | ? | Central-east |
| Dogon, Tomo Kan | Dogon | | None? | 133,000 | ? | Central-east |
| Dogon, Toro Tegu | Dogon | | None? | 2,900 | ? | Central-east |
| Dogon, Yanda Dom | Dogon | | None? | 2,000 | ? | Central-east |
| Duungooma | | Mande | None? | 70,000 | ? | S |
| Jahanka | | Mande | None? | 500 | ? | SW |
| Jalunga, Dyalonke | | Mande | None? | 9,000 | ? | SW |
| Jowulu | | Mande | None? | 10,000 | ? | SE |
| Jula, Dioula | Manding | Mande | None? | 50,000 | 278,000 | SE, all? |
| Kagoro | Manding | Mande | None? | 15,000 | ? | W |
| Konabéré | | Mande | None? | 25,000 | ? | SE |
| Koromfé | | Niger–Congo / Gur | None? | 6,000 | ? | SE |
| Maninkakan, Eastern | Manding | Mande | None? | 390,000 | ? | SW |
| Maninkakan, Western | Manding | Mande | None? | 100,000 | ? | SW |
| Marka | | Mande | None? | 25,000 | ? | SE |
| Mòoré | | Niger–Congo / Gur | None? | 17,000 | ? | SE |
| Pana | | Niger–Congo / Gur | None? | 2,800 | ? | Central-east |
| Pulaar | Fula | Niger–Congo / Senegambian | None? | 175,000 | ? | W |
| Pular | Fula | Niger–Congo / Senegambian | None? | 50,000 | ? | SW |
| Sàmòmá | | Niger–Congo / Gur | None? | 2,500 | ? | SE |
| Senoufo, Shempire | Senufo | Niger–Congo | None? | 14,800 | ? | SE |
| Senoufo, Sìcìté | Senufo | Niger–Congo | None? | 3,000 | ? | SE |
| Senoufo, Supyire | Senufo | Niger–Congo | None? | 350,000 | ? | S |
| Songhay, Humburi Senni | Songhay (Southern) | | None? | 15,000 | ? | N |
| Songhay, Koyra Chiini | Songhay (Southern) | | None? | 200,000 | ? | N |
| Tadaksahak | Songhay (Northern) | | None? | 100,000 | ? | N |
| Tamajaq | Tamashek | Afro-Asiatic / Berber | None? | 190,000 | ? | N |
| Tondi Songway Kiini | Songhay (Southern) | | None? | 3,000 | ? | N |
| Zarmaci | Songhay (Southern) | | None? | 1,700 | ? | NE |

- First language / mother tongue speakers. Figures from Ethnologue.
  - Second or additional language speakers. It is difficult to get accurate figures for this category.

== Language policies and planning ==
=== General ===
French is the working language. Thirteen indigenous languages were previously recognised by the government as national languages: Bamanankan, Bomu, Bozo, Dɔgɔsɔ, Fulfulde, Hassaniya Arabic, Mamara, Maninkakan, Soninke, Soŋoy, Syenara, Tamasheq, Xaasongaxanŋo. However, the current constitution of Mali, under General Assimi Goita, states "all national languages are official languages" while refraining from naming any of those languages.

=== Education ===
French is part of the standard school curriculum. There is a new policy to use Malian languages in the first grades and transition to French. Activists are also teaching literacy to speakers of Manding languages (Bambara, Malinke, Maninkakan, Dyula) in the standardized N'Ko form.
