= DWL (disambiguation) =

Deadweight loss is a term in economics.

DWL may also stand for:

- Designwaterline, or summer seawater load line, a load line for watercraft
- Deutsche Wasserball-Liga, the premier category in the league system for water polo clubs in Germany
- Doświadczalne Warsztaty Lotnicze, a Polish aircraft manufacturer 1933-1939
- Bankan Tey Dogon, ISO 639-3 language code dwl
