= Dogon languages =

Dialect continuum of southeastern Mali

Dogon
- Geographic distribution: Dogon country, Mali (mainly Bandiagara Region)
- Ethnicity: Dogon people
- Native speakers: est. 600,000
- Linguistic classification: Niger-Congo?: Dogon
- Subdivisions: Plains Dogon; Escarpment; West Dogon (Budu); North Plateau; Naŋa–Walo (Yanda); Tebul Dogon; ? Ana Dogon

Language codes
- Glottolog: dogo1299
- Map of the Dogon languages Bangime (possible language isolate) Plains Dogon – Jamsai, Toro Tegu, Western Plains (Togo Kan, Tengu Kan, Tomo Kan) Escarpment Dogon – Toro So, Tommo So, Donno So West Dogon – Duleri, Mombo, Ampari–Penange, Budu North Plateau Dogon – Bondum, Dogul Nanga languages – Nanga, Bankan Tey, Ben Tey, Yanda Tebul Dogon (+ Tebul Sign Language) Ana Dogon

The Dogon languages are a small closely related language family that is spoken by the Dogon people of Mali and may belong to the proposed Niger–Congo family. There are about 600,000 speakers of its dozen languages. They are tonal languages, and most have two tones, but some, like Donno So, have three. Their basic word order is subject–object–verb.

== External relationships ==
The evidence linking Dogon to the Niger–Congo family is mainly a few numerals and some common core vocabulary. Various theories have been proposed, placing them with Gur, Mande, or as an independent branch, the last now being the preferred approach. The Dogon languages show very few remnants of the noun class system characteristic of much of Niger–Congo, leading linguists to conclude that they likely diverged from Niger–Congo very early.

Roger Blench comments,

Dogon is both lexically and structurally very different from most other [Niger–Congo] families. It lacks the noun-classes usually regarded as typical of Niger–Congo and has a word order (SOV) that resembles Mande and Ịjọ, but not the other branches. The system of verbal inflections, resembling French is quite unlike any surrounding languages. As a consequence, the ancestor of Dogon is likely to have diverged very early, although the present-day languages probably reflect an origin some 3–4000 years ago. Dogon languages are territorially coherent, suggesting that, despite local migration histories, the Dogon have been in this area of Mali from their origin.

and:

Dogon is certainly a well-founded and coherent group. But it has no characteristic Niger–Congo features (noun-classes, verbal extensions, labial-velars) and very few lexical cognates. It could equally well be an independent language family.

The Bamana and Fula languages have exerted significant influence on Dogon, due to their close cultural and geographical ties.

Blench (2015) speculates that Bangime and Dogon languages may have a substratum from a "missing" branch of Nilo-Saharan that had split off relatively early from Proto-Nilo-Saharan, and tentatively calls that branch "Plateau".

== Internal classification ==
The Dogon consider themselves a single ethnic group, but recognise that their languages are different. In Dogon cosmology, Dogon constitutes six of the twelve languages of the world (the others being Fulfulde, Mooré, Bambara, Bozo and Tamasheq). Jamsay is thought to be the original Dogon language, but the Dogon "recognise a myriad of tiny distinctions even between parts of villages and sometimes individuals, and strive to preserve these" (Hochstetler 2004:18).

The best-studied Dogon language is the escarpment language Toro So (Tɔrɔ sɔɔ) of Sanga, due to Marcel Griaule's studies there and because Toro So was selected as one of thirteen national languages of Mali. It is mutually intelligible with other escarpment varieties. However, the plains languages—Tene Ka, Tomo Ka, and Jamsay, which are not intelligible with Toro So—have more speakers.

Bangime language (aka Baŋgɛri mɛ), is considered a divergent branch of Dogon by some and a possible language isolate by others (Blench 2005b). It is now generally considered to be an isolate.

=== Calame-Griaule (1956) ===
Calame-Griaule appears to have been the first to work out the various varieties of Dogon. Calame-Griaule (1956) classified the languages as follows, with accommodation given for languages which have since been discovered (new Dogon languages were reported as late as 2005), or have since been shown to be mutually intelligible (as Hochstetler confirmed for the escarpment dialects). The two standard languages are asterisked.

- Plains Dogon: Jamsai,*Tɔrɔ tegu, Western Plains (dialects: Togo kã, Tengu kã, Tomo kã)
- Escarpment Dogon (dialects: Tɔrɔ sɔɔ,*Tommo so, Donno sɔ aka Kamma sɔ)
- West Dogon: Duleri, Mombo, Ampari–Penange; Budu
- North Plateau Dogon: Bondum, Dogul
- Yanda
- Nanga: Naŋa, Bankan Tey (Walo), Ben Tey
- Tebul

Douyon and Blench (2005) report an additional variety, which is as yet unclassified:

- Ana Tiŋa.

Blench noted that the plural suffix on nouns suggests that Budu is closest to Mombo, so it has been tentatively included as West Dogon above. He also notes that Walo–Kumbe is lexically similar to Naŋa; Hochstetler suspects it may be Naŋa. The similarities between these languages may be shared with Yanda. These are all extremely poorly known.

=== Glottolog 4.3 ===
Glottolog 4.3 synthesises classifications from Moran & Prokić (2013) and Hochstetler (2004). Moran & Prokić (2013) argue for a binary east-west split within Dogon, with Yanda Dom Dogon, Tebul Ure Dogon, and Najamba-Kindige as originally western Dogon languages that have become increasingly more similar to eastern Dogon languages due to intensive contact.

- Dogon
  - Western division
    - West Dogon
      - Ampari Dogon
      - Bunoge Dogon
      - Mombo Dogon
      - Penange Dogon
      - Tiranige Diga Dogon
    - North Plateau Dogon
      - Dogul Dom Dogon
      - Yanda-Bondum-Tebul
        - Najamba-Kindige: Bondum Dom, Kindige, Najamba
        - Tebul Ure Dogon
        - Yanda-Ana
          - Ana Tinga Dogon
          - Yanda Dom Dogon
  - Eastern division
    - Escarpment Dogon
      - Donno So Dogon
      - Tommo So Dogon
      - Toro So Dogon: Ibi So, Ireli, Sangha So, Yorno So, Youga So
    - Nangan Dogon
      - Bankan Tey Dogon
      - Ben Tey Dogon
      - Nanga Dogon
    - Plains Dogon
      - Jamsay Dogon: Bama, Domno, Gono, Guru, Perge Tegu
      - Toro Tegu Dogon
      - Western Plains Dogon
        - Tengou-Togo Dogon: Gimri Kan, Tengu Kan, Tenu Kan, Togo Kan, Woru Kan
        - Tomo Kan Dogon

== Comparative vocabulary ==
Comparison of basic vocabulary words of the Dogon languages, along with Bangime:

Language	Location	eye	ear	nose	tooth	tongue	mouth	blood	bone	tree	water	eat	name
Yorno-So		gìrǐː	súgùrù	kín	ɛ̌n	nɛ́nɛ́, nɛ̀nɛ̌ː	kɛ̀nɛ́, áŋá	ìllîː	kǐː	náː	dǐː	káː	bôy
Toro Tegu	Tabi	jìró, gìró	súgúrú	cìrⁿò-ká	jìrⁿó	lèlá	ká	néŋ	cìrá	náː, X nà	ní	lí ~ lɛ́	ìsǒŋ
Ben Tey	Beni	jìré	súːrⁿù	círⁿì	ìrⁿú, ìrⁿí	lɛ̀mdɛ̂ː	mǒː, m̀bǒː	gòŋgòró	cìrⁿéy	náː, nàː-dûm	nîː	ñɛ́	ìnìrⁿîː
Yanda Dom	Yanda	gìd-íyè, gìdè	sún	kìnzà	ìn	nɛ̀mdà	cɛ́nɛ́, m̀bò	jènjù	kìrⁿà	tìmè, tìmɛ̀, nìː	ínjú	ʔə́ñɛ́ ~ ʔə́ñá-lì	ín
Jamsay	Douentza	jìré	sûn	círⁿé	ìrⁿé	nɛ̀nɛ́	káː	nɛ̂yⁿ	cìrⁿé	náː	níː	ñɛ́ː	bón
Perge Tegu	Pergué	gìré	súŋúrⁿù	kírⁿé	ìrⁿé	lɛ̀lɛ́	káː	nɛ̂m	kìrⁿé	náː	níː	ñɛ́ː	sórⁿú
Gourou	Kiri	gìré	súŋùn	kírⁿé	ìrⁿé	nɛ̀nɛ́	káː	nɛ̂yⁿ	kìrⁿé	̀̌	níː	ñɛ́ː	bón
Nanga	Anda	gìré	súŋúrⁿì	kírⁿê	ǹnɛ́, ìnɛ́, ìrⁿɛ́	nɛ́ndɛ̀	nɔ̌ː	gòndùgó	kìrⁿá	déː, nàː dûː	nîː	kɔ́ː	ǹnèrⁿî, ìnèrⁿî
Bankan-Tey	Walo	gìré	sûn	círⁿè	ŋìrⁿɛ́, ñìrⁿɛ́	lɛ̀mbìrɛ̂	mbǔː	gòŋgòró	kìrⁿěy	nàː-dûm	nîː	ñɛ́	ŋìnnîː, ñìnnîː
Najamba	Kubewel-Adia	gìró ~ gìré	súnùː ~ súnìː	kìnjâː ~ kìnjɛ̂ː	ìnɔ̌ː ~ ìnɛ̌ː	nɛ̌ndɔ̀ː ~ nɛ̌ndɛ̀ː	ìbí-ŋgé ~ ìbí	gěn-gé ~ gěn	kìná-ŋgó ~ kìná	nǐː ~ nìː-mbó	íŋgé ~ íŋgé, ínjé ~ ínjé	kwɛ́	ínèn ~ ínèn
Tommo-So	Tongo-Tongo	gìré	súgúlú	kínú	ìnú	nííndɛ́	kɛ̀nnɛ́, áŋá	ìlìyé	kìyé	tímɛ́	díí	ńyɛ́	bóy
Togo-Kan	Koporo-pen	gìré	súgúrú	kírⁿí	ìrⁿí	nɛ́nɛ́	káⁿ	nɛ́	kìrⁿí	náː	díː	ñíː ~ ñíː	bɔ́ⁿ
Mombo	Songho	gírè	súgúlí kìjìkìjì	kínjà	ínnì	nèːndé	dónì	gèːŋgé	gàːwⁿěː	tíníŋgɔ̀	mîː	ɲɛ́ː	íní
Bangime		ɡìré	tàŋà	súmbí-rì	n nóɔ́ n síìⁿ	nóɔ́ n ʒɛ̀rí	nɔ́ɔ̀	ʒíì	nnòɔ̀rɛ̀	dʷàà, dʷàɛ̀	ɥíè	dì-á	(màá) níì

== Numerals ==
Comparison of numerals in individual languages:

Language	1	2	3	4	5	6	7	8	9	10
Dogulu Dom (1)	tɔ̀mɔ̀	nééɡè	táándù	kɛ́ɛ́sɔ̀	ǹó	kúlè	sɔ́ɔ́wɛ̀	sèèlé	tùùwɔ́	pɛ́ɛ̀l
Dogul Dom Dogon (2)	tomo	nɛiɡe	taandu	kɛɛso	n'nɔ	kuloi	sɔɔi	seele	tuwɔ	pɛɛl
Tommo So Dogon	tíí (túmɔ́ as a modifier)	néé	tààndú	nǎy	ǹnɔ́	kúlóy	sɔ́y	ɡáɡìrà	túwwɔ́	pɛ́l
Donno So Dogon	tí (for counting), túru	lɛ̀y	tàːnu	này	nùmoro / nnɔ	kúlóy / kulei	sɔ̀y	ɡàɡara	tùo / tuɡɔ	pɛ́lu
Jamsay Dogon	túrú	lɛ̌y / lɛ̀y	tǎːn / tàːn	nǎyⁿ / nàyⁿ *	nǔːyⁿ / nùːyⁿ	kúróy	sûyⁿ	ɡáːrà	láːrúwà / láːrwà	pɛ́rú
Toro So Dogon (1)	tíì (for counting), túrú	lɛ́j	tàánú	nàjí	nùmɔ́r̃ɔ́	kúlòj	sɔ́j	ɡáárà	túwɔ́	pɛ́rú
Toro So Dogon (2)	tíírú (for counting), túrú	léí	táánú	náí	númɔ́rɔ́n	kúlóí	sɔ́í	ɡáɡárá	túwɔ́	pɛ́lú
Toro Tegu Dogon	túrú	lɛ̌y	tǎːlí	nǎyⁿ *	nǔːyⁿ	kúréy	sóyⁿ	ɡáːrà	láːrà	pɛ́ró
Bankan Tey Dogon	tùmá	jǒj	tàːní	nìŋŋějⁿ	nùmmǔjⁿ	kúròj	síjⁿɔ̀jⁿ	ɡáːràj	tèːsúm	pɛ́ːrú
Ben Tey Dogon	tùmɔ́:	yěy	tàːnú	nǐːyⁿ	nùmǔyⁿ	kúròy	súyⁿɔ̀yⁿ	ɡáːrày	tèːsǐm	pɛ́rú
Mombo Dogon	yɛ̀ːtáːŋɡù / tíːtà (in counting)	nɛ́ːŋɡá	táːndì	kɛ́ːjɔ́	núːmù	kúléyⁿ	sɔ́ːlì	séːlè	tóːwà	pɛ́ːlù
Najamba-Kindige	kúndé	nôːj	tàːndîː	kɛ́ːdʒɛ̀j	nùmîː	kúlèj	swɛ̂j	sáːɡìː	twâj	píjɛ́lì
Nanga Dogon	tùmâ	wǒj	tàːndǐː	nɔ̌jⁿ	nìmǐː	kúrê	sújɛ̂	ɡáːrɛ̀	tèːsǐː	pɛ́ːrú
Togo Kan Dogon (1)	tí	lɔ́y	tàán, tàánú	nǎyⁿ	núnɛ́ɛ́ⁿ	kúréé	sɔ́ɔ̀	sìláà	túwáà	pɛ́rú
Togo Kan Dogon (2)	tí	lɔ́yì	tánn	náɲì	númɛ̀	kúlèn	sɔ́	sílà	túwà	pɛ́lì
Yanda Dom Dogon	tùmá:	nɔ́ː / nó	táːndù	cɛ́zɔ̀	nûm	kúlé	swɛ́ː	sáːɡè	twâː	píyél

== See also ==
- Languages of Mali
- Dogon word lists (Wiktionary)
