= Ben Tey Dogon =

Dogon language spoken in Mali

Ben Tey
- Region: Mali
- Native speakers: 3,000 (2004/2005) to 2,000 (2011)
- Language family: Niger–Congo?: Dogon; Nanga; Ben Tey

Language codes
- ISO 639-3: dbt
- Glottolog: bent1238
- ELP: Ben Tey

Ben Tey Dogon, named after the village Been it is spoken in, is a divergent, recently described Dogon language spoken in Mali. It is closely related to Bankan Tey and Nanga Dogon. It is said that elders in the Dogon village of Gawru also speak this language. Been is reported to have been settled from the village of Walo, and Ben Tey Dogon differs from Walo Dogon primarily from being under a different foreign influence, as Been village is surrounded by Jamsay-speaking villages, which Walo is not.
