= AQD =

AQD or variant may refer to:

- Additional qualification designator, code used in the United States Navy
- Ampari Dogon (ISO 639-3 language code 'aqd'), language spoken in Mali
- Aqd, contract in Islamic law, such as an ʿaqd al-qirān (marriage contract)
- Austin Quinn-Davidson (born 1979), American politician
