= Tommo (disambiguation) =

Tommo may refer to:

- Thomas "Tommo" Peaceful, the protagonist in Private Peaceful
- Tommo, a minor character from Hollyoaks
- Tommo, a video game publisher
- Tommo & Hawk, the second novel in Bryce Courtenay's Australian trilogy
- Tommo So, a Dogon dialect spoken in Mali
- Tommo, a district in the Mamuju Regency of the West Sulawesi province, Indonesia
