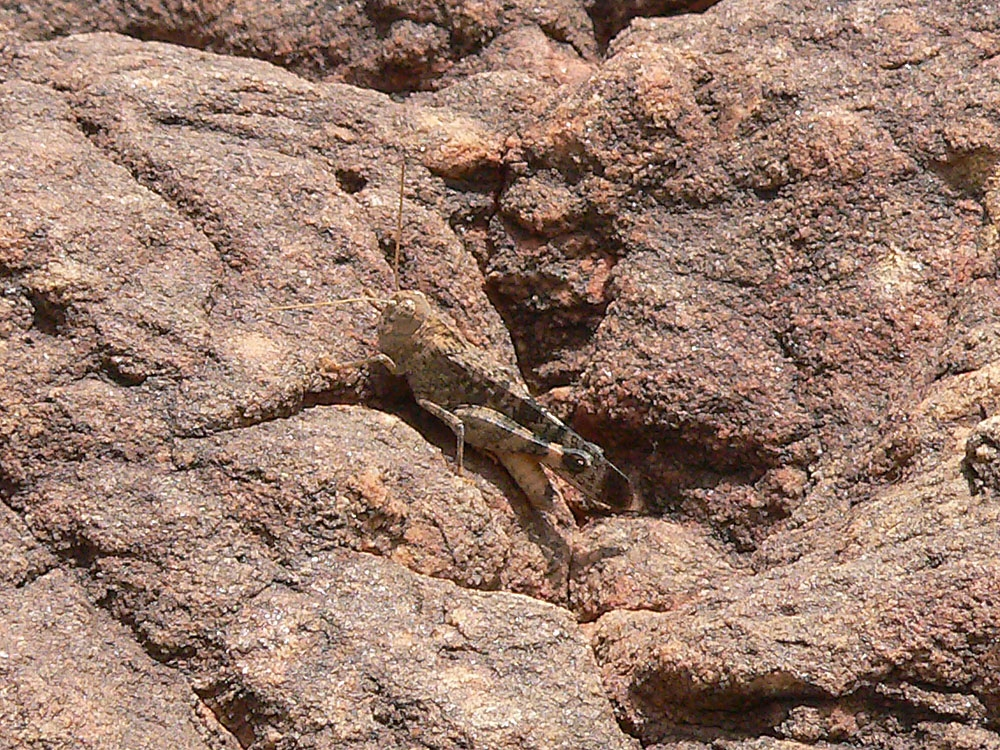
- Male Scintharista notabilis photographed near Janbirji, Niger

Scientific classification
- Kingdom: Animalia
- Phylum: Arthropoda
- Class: Insecta
- Order: Orthoptera
- Suborder: Caelifera
- Family: Acrididae
- Tribe: Locustini
- Genus: Scintharista
- Species: S. notabilis

Binomial name
- Scintharista notabilis (Walker, 1870)

= Scintharista notabilis =

Species of short-horned grasshopper

Scintharista notabilis is a species of short-horned grasshopper in the family Acrididae. It is found in Africa, the Middle East, and South Asia.

It is common in rocky hills in the northern Dogon Country of Mali.
