= Cryptocatantops allessandricus =

Scientific classification
- Kingdom: Animalia
- Phylum: Arthropoda
- Clade: Pancrustacea
- Class: Insecta
- Order: Orthoptera
- Suborder: Caelifera
- Family: Acrididae
- Genus: Cryptocatantops
- Species: C. allessandricus

Binomial name
- Cryptocatantops allessandricus (Sjöstedt, 1931)

Species of grasshopper

Cryptocatantops allessandricus is a species of grasshopper in the Cryptocatantops genus.
