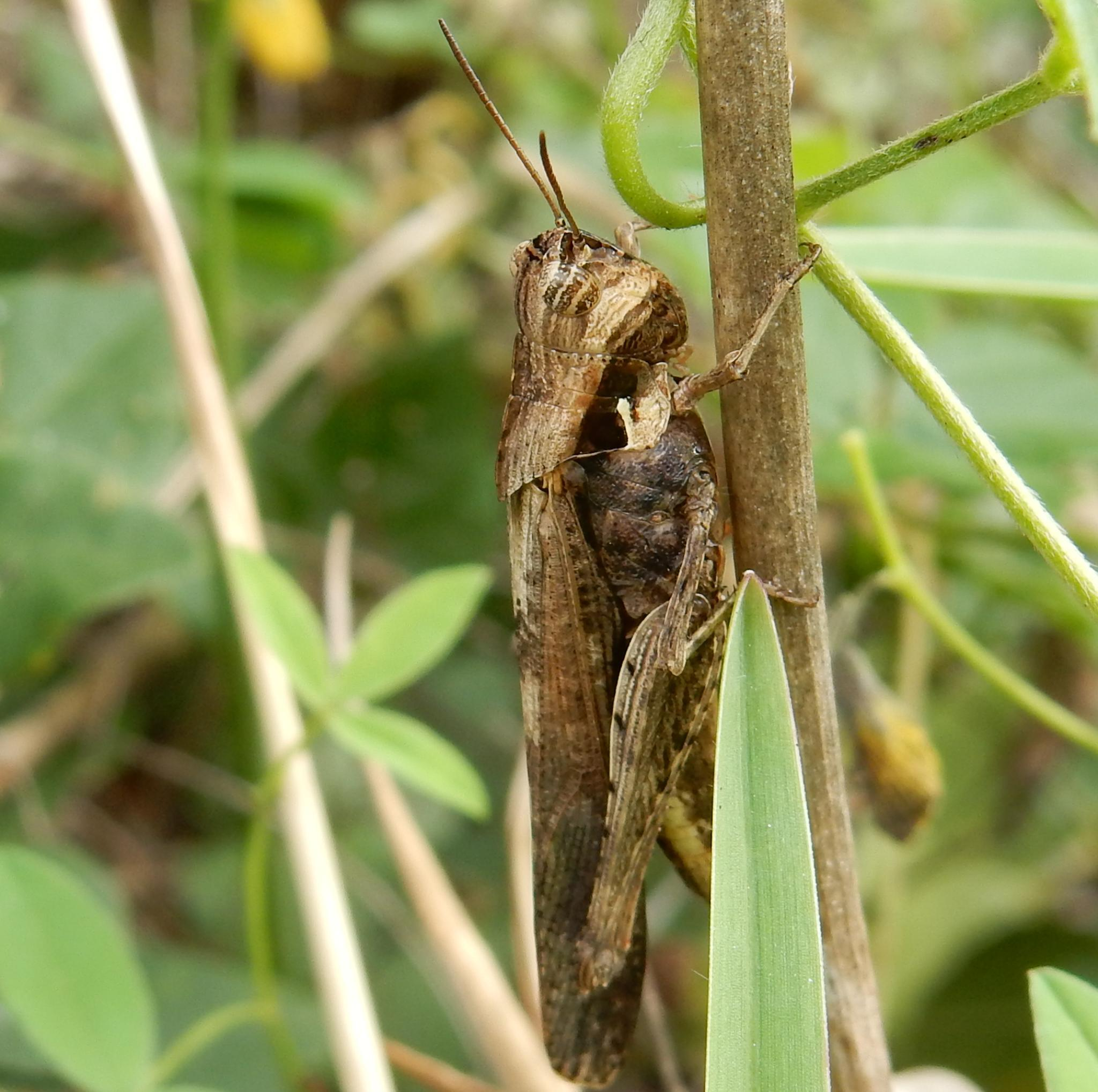
- Morphacris fasciata, South Africa

Scientific classification
- Kingdom: Animalia
- Phylum: Arthropoda
- Class: Insecta
- Order: Orthoptera
- Suborder: Caelifera
- Family: Acrididae
- Subfamily: Oedipodinae
- Genus: Morphacris; Walker, 1870

= Morphacris =

Genus of grasshoppers

Morphacris is a genus of band-winged grasshoppers in the family Acrididae. There are at least two described species in Morphacris, found in Africa, Europe, and Asia.

== Species ==
These species belong to the genus Morphacris:

- Morphacris citrina Kirby, 1910
- Morphacris fasciata (Thunberg, 1815)
