= Cryptocatantops debilis =

Scientific classification
- Kingdom: Animalia
- Phylum: Arthropoda
- Clade: Pancrustacea
- Class: Insecta
- Order: Orthoptera
- Suborder: Caelifera
- Family: Acrididae
- Genus: Cryptocatantops
- Species: C. debilis

Binomial name
- Cryptocatantops debilis (Krauss, 1901)

Synonyms
- Catantops debilis Krauss 1901; Catantops elegans Karny, 1907; Cryptocatantops elegans (Karny, 1907)

Species of grasshoppers

Cryptocatantops debilis is a species of grasshoppers in the subfamily Catantopinae, a group of insects commonly called spur-throated grasshoppers. The type specimen was a female found in Omaruru, Namibia.
