= Cryptocatantops crassifemoralis =

Scientific classification
- Kingdom: Animalia
- Phylum: Arthropoda
- Clade: Pancrustacea
- Class: Insecta
- Order: Orthoptera
- Suborder: Caelifera
- Family: Acrididae
- Genus: Cryptocatantops
- Species: C. crassifemoralis

Binomial name
- Cryptocatantops crassifemoralis Johnsen, 1991

Species of grasshopper

Cryptocatantops crassifemoralis is a species of grasshopper in the Cryptocatantops genus found in southern Africa.
