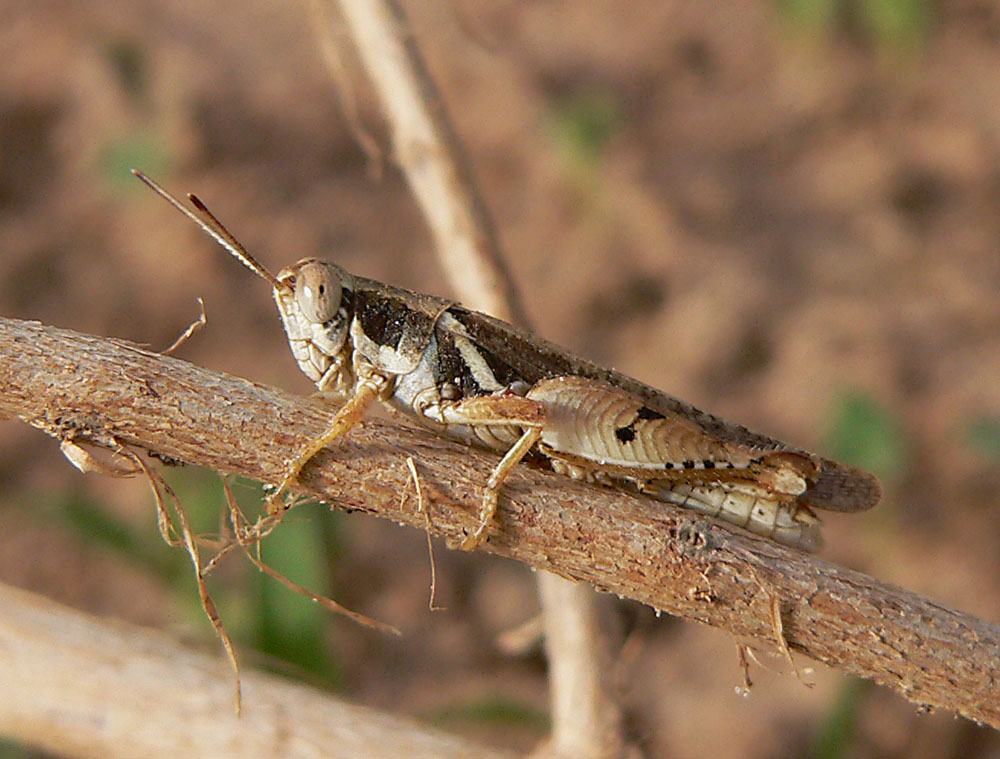
- Male Cryptocatantops haemorrhoidalis Senegal

Scientific classification
- Kingdom: Animalia
- Phylum: Arthropoda
- Clade: Pancrustacea
- Class: Insecta
- Order: Orthoptera
- Suborder: Caelifera
- Family: Acrididae
- Subfamily: Catantopinae
- Genus: Cryptocatantops; Jago 1984

Type species
- Cryptocatantops haemorrhoidalis (Krauss, 1877)

Species
- See text

= Cryptocatantops =

Genus of grasshoppers

Cryptocatantops is a genus of grasshoppers in the subfamily Catantopinae, a group of insects primarily found in Africa. As numerous other genera, it is not yet assigned to a particular tribe.

== Species ==
- Cryptocatantops allessandricus Sjöstedt, 1931
- Cryptocatantops crassifemoralis Johnsen, 1991
- Cryptocatantops debilis Krauss, 1901
- Cryptocatantops haemorrhoidalis Krauss, 1877
- Cryptocatantops simlae Dirsh, 1956
- Cryptocatantops uvarovi Dirsh, 1956
