= Penange Dogon =

Dogon language of Mali

Penange
- Native to: Mali
- Region: Pinia village
- Language family: Niger–Congo?: Dogon; West; Ampari–Penange; Penange

Language codes
- ISO 639-3: None (mis)
- Glottolog: pena1270
- ELP: Penange

Penange Dogon is a Dogon language spoken in Mali. It is close to Ampari. The language was first described as distinct in 2011 by Prokhorov.

The Penange Dogon speakers live in the village of Pinia (péná) in Bandiagara Cercle and call themselves péná nógè, "Pinia people".

== Sources ==
- "Dogon and Bangime Linguistics. Dogon languages"..
