= Toro-tegu Dogon =

Dogon language of Mali

- Tɔrɔ tegu
- Region: Mali
- Native speakers: (2,900 cited 1998)
- Language family: Niger–Congo?: Dogon; Plains; Toro-tegu Dogon

Language codes
- ISO 639-3: dtt
- Glottolog: toro1253

The Toro language, Tɔrɔ tegu 'Mountain speech', is a Dogon language spoken in Mali. It is closest to the prestige variety of Dogon, Jamsay tegu, though speakers deny they are related and understand little of it. (They understand nothing of the Dogon languages on the escarpment or plateau.) Hochstetler report difficulties in comprehension between Tɔrɔ tegu and one of the western Plains Dogon languages, Tomo kan.

== Phonology ==
=== Consonants ===
Consonant phonemes
| | | Labial | Alveolar | Alveopalatal | Velar |
|---|---|---|---|---|---|
| Nasal | | m | n | | ŋ |
| Plosive | voiceless | p | t | tʃ | k |
| Plosive | voiced | b | d | dʒ | ɡ |
| Fricative | | | s | | |
| Lateral | | | l | | |
| Sonorant | | w ~ w̃ | ɾ ~ ɾ̃ | j ~ j̃ | |

=== Vowels ===
Vowel Phonemes
| Short Oral | Long Oral | Long Nasal |
|---|---|---|
| u | uː | ũː |
| o | oː | õː |
| ɔ | ɔː | ɔ̃ː |
| a | aː | ãː |
| ɛ | ɛː | ɛ̃ː |
| e | eː | ẽː |
| i | iː | ĩː |

=== Tone ===
There are two tones, high and low. Each stem contains a tone melody, and each tone melody must contain at least one high tone- that is, a word cannot be exclusively low tone. The tone melody of a word may be overridden by inflectional morphology or syntax. In some cases a word may HLH or LHL melody, as in the case of gɔːn˧˦˨ (griot with war tomtoms) or kaː˦˨nu˦ (monkey).

== Grammar ==
=== Number ===
When referring to humans, number is indicated by suffixing of the noun. In words for humans with a basic CV- stem, the singular suffix is -r̃ú. In words for humans with longer stems, the singular suffix is -nú or apocopated -ń. For plural words for humans, the suffix is -mú or -ḿ, regardless of stem length.

== Sources ==
- Blench, Roger (2005). "A survey of Dogon languages in Mali: Overview". OGMIOS: Newsletter of Foundation for Endangered Languages. 3.02 (26): 14–15..
- Hochstetler, J. Lee; Durieux, J.A.; E.I.K. Durieux-Boon (2004). Sociolinguistic Survey of the Dogon Language Area (PDF). SIL International.
