= Budu Dogon =

Dogon language

- Bunɔɡɛ
- Region: Mali
- Native speakers: 1,000 (2005)
- Language family: Niger–Congo?: Dogon; West; Budu Dogon

Language codes
- ISO 639-3: dgb
- Glottolog: buno1241
- ELP: Bunoge

Budu Dogon or Bunoge, also known as Korandabo, is a Dogon language spoken in Mali. It was first reported online around 2005. The plural suffix on nouns is closest to Kolum so, suggesting it should be classified as a West Dogon language.

The people call themselves Budu, and Tɔmmɔ-sɔ speakers call the language Budu-sɔ. It has also been called Budu-Tagu, the name of the principal Budu village.
