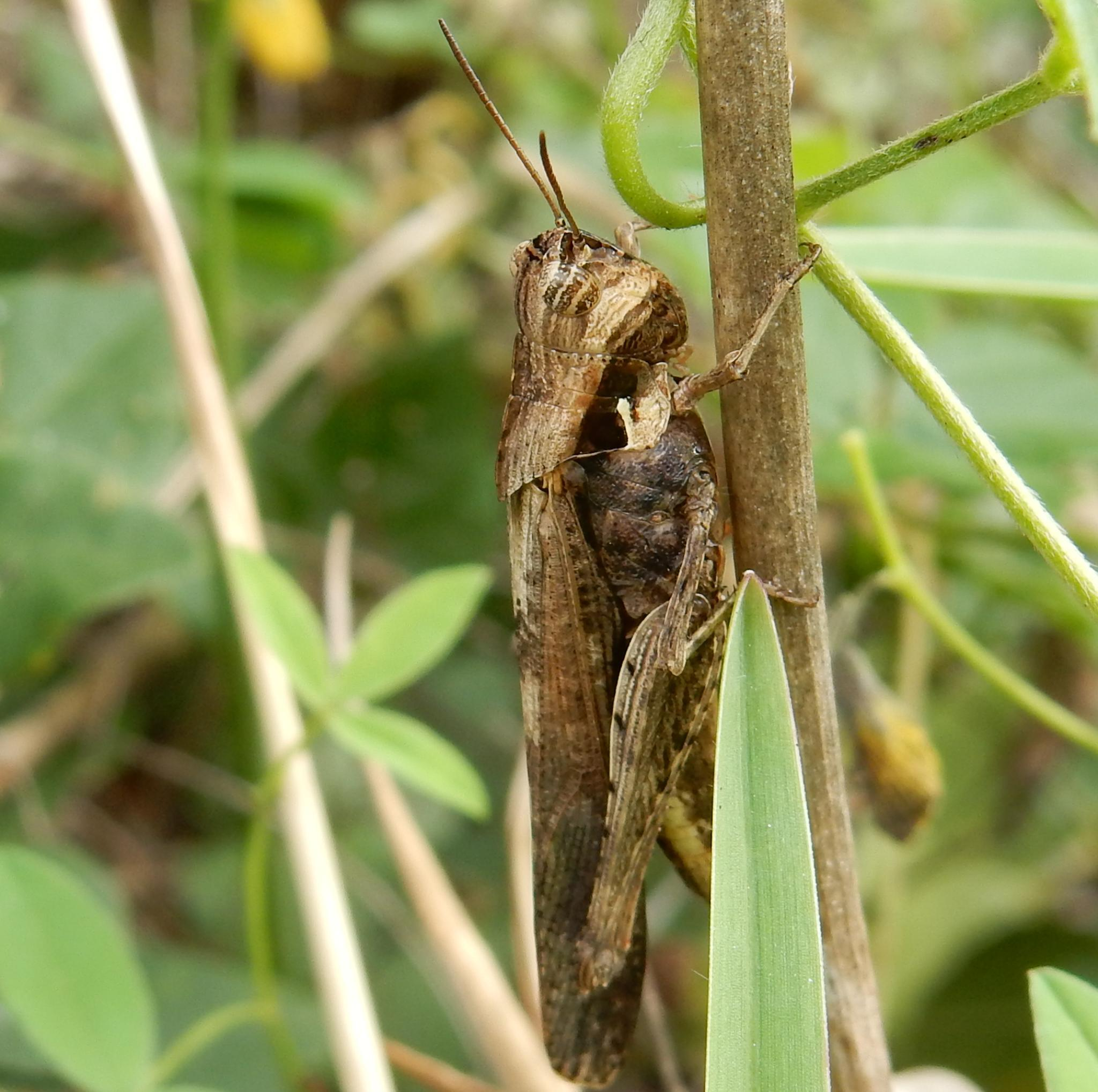
- Morphacris fasciata, South Africa

Scientific classification
- Domain: Eukaryota
- Kingdom: Animalia
- Phylum: Arthropoda
- Class: Insecta
- Order: Orthoptera
- Suborder: Caelifera
- Family: Acrididae
- Subfamily: Oedipodinae
- Genus: Morphacris
- Species: M. fasciata

Binomial name
- Morphacris fasciata (Thunberg, 1815)

= Morphacris fasciata =

Species of band-winged grasshopper

Morphacris fasciata is a species of band-winged grasshopper in the family Acrididae. It is found in Africa, Europe, and Asia.
