= Ana Dogon =

Dogon language of Mali

- Ana Tiŋa
- Region: Mali
- Native speakers: 500 (2005)
- Language family: Niger–Congo?: Dogon; (unclassified); Ana Dogon

Language codes
- ISO 639-3: dti
- Glottolog: anat1248

- People: Ana Bɔmu
- Language: Ana Tiŋa

Ana Dogon, or Ana Tiŋa, is a Dogon language spoken in Mali. It was first reported online in 2005 by Roger Blench.
