= Sherifuria haningtoni =

Scientific classification
- Kingdom: Animalia
- Phylum: Arthropoda
- Clade: Pancrustacea
- Class: Insecta
- Order: Orthoptera
- Suborder: Caelifera
- Family: Acrididae
- Subfamily: Acridinae
- Genus: Sherifuria
- Species: S. haningtoni

Binomial name
- Sherifuria haningtoni Uvarov, 1926

Species of grasshopper

Sherifuria haningtoni is a species of short-horned grasshopper in the family Acrididae. It is found in West Africa.

In Mali, it is common in rocky areas, and is considered to be a pest that eats grasses and grains.
