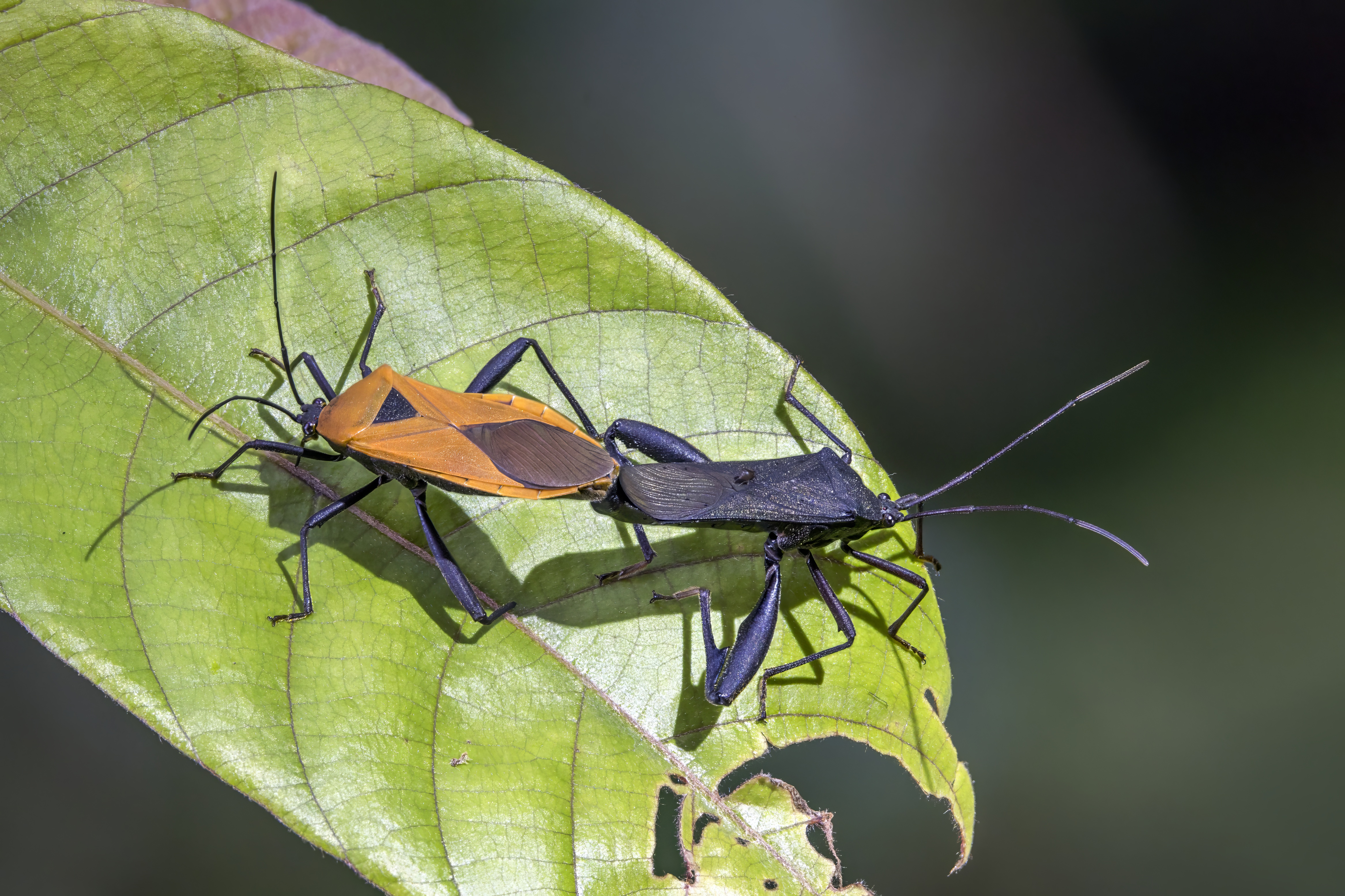
- mating; the female is on the left Ghana

Scientific classification
- Kingdom: Animalia
- Phylum: Arthropoda
- Clade: Pancrustacea
- Class: Insecta
- Order: Hemiptera
- Suborder: Heteroptera
- Family: Coreidae
- Genus: Anoplocnemis
- Species: A. curvipes

Binomial name
- Anoplocnemis curvipes (Fabricius, 1781)

= Anoplocnemis curvipes =

Species of true bug

Anoplocnemis curvipes is a species of sap-sucking insect in the genus Anoplocnemis. They are native to sub-saharan Africa where they are considered a major pest of many types of agricultural plants such as trees and shrubs, including legumes. This has earned them the name leaf-wilter.
