= Ouenkoro =

- Commune and town
- Location in Mali
- Coordinates: 13°23′N 3°50′W
- Country: Mali
- Region: Mopti Region
- Cercle: Bankass Cercle

Population (1998)
  - Total: 18,123
- Time zone: UTC+0 (GMT)

Ouenkoro is a small town and commune in the Cercle of Bankass in the Mopti Region of Mali. In 1998 the commune had a population of 18,123.
