= Bamako Sign Language =

Sign language used in Mali

- Malian Sign Language
- Native to: Mali
- Region: Bamako
- Users: 25,000 (2021)
- Language family: Deaf-community sign language

Language codes
- ISO 639-3: bog
- Glottolog: bama1249
- ELP: Malian Sign Language

Bamako Sign Language (French: Langue des signes de Bamako), also known as Malian Sign Language, or LaSiMa (Langue des signes malienne) is a sign language that developed outside the Malian educational system, in the urban tea-circles of Bamako where deaf men gathered after work. It is used predominantly by men, and is threatened by the educational use of American Sign Language, which is the language of instruction for those deaf children who go to school.

== See also ==
- Tebul Sign Language, village sign of the Dogon region
