= Koporokendie Na =

- Commune and village
- Location in Mali
- Coordinates: 14°7′51″N 3°21′14″W
- Country: Mali
- Region: Mopti Region
- Cercle: Koro Cercle

Population (2009 census)
  - Total: 18,746
- Time zone: UTC+0 (GMT)

Koporokendie Na is a village and commune of the Cercle of Koro in the Mopti Region of Mali.
