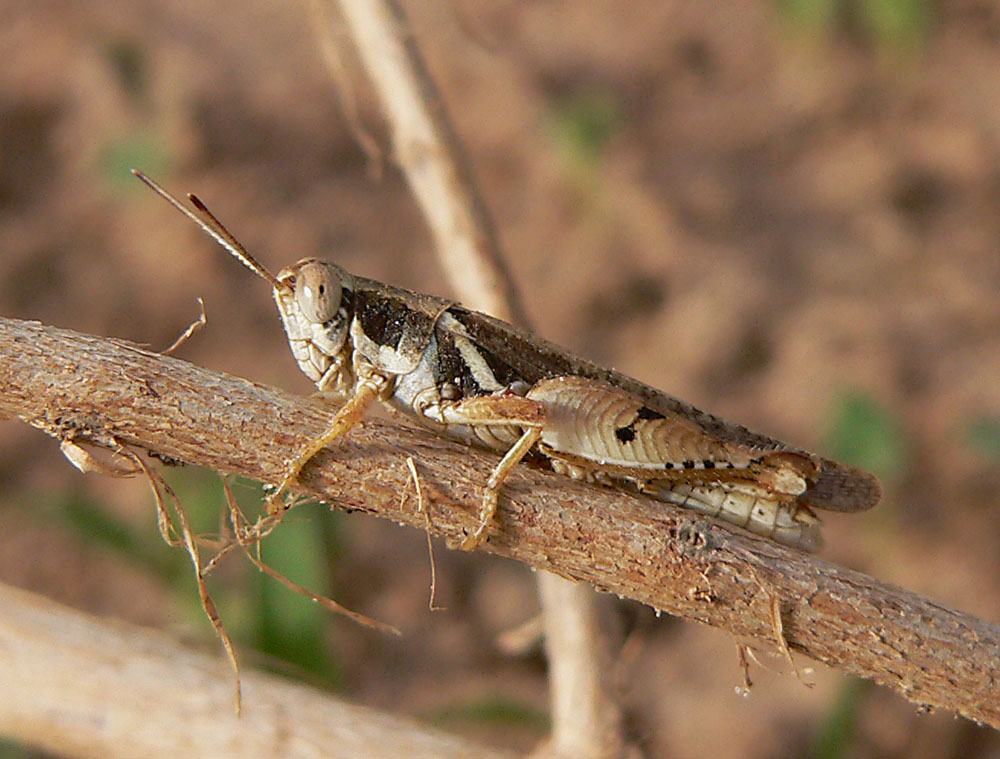
- Cryptocatantops haemorrhoidalis male

Scientific classification
- Kingdom: Animalia
- Phylum: Arthropoda
- Clade: Pancrustacea
- Class: Insecta
- Order: Orthoptera
- Suborder: Caelifera
- Family: Acrididae
- Genus: Cryptocatantops
- Species: C. haemorrhoidalis

Binomial name
- Cryptocatantops haemorrhoidalis (Krauss, 1877)

= Cryptocatantops haemorrhoidalis =

Species of grasshopper

Cryptocatantops haemorrhoidalis is a species of grasshopper in the Cryptocatantops genus.
