= Bankan Tey Dogon =

Dogon language of Mali

Bankan Tey
- Walo-Kumbe
- Region: Mali
- Native speakers: (1,300 cited 1998 census)
- Language family: Niger–Congo?: Dogon; Nanga; Bankan Tey

Language codes
- ISO 639-3: dbw
- Glottolog: bank1259
- ELP: Bankan Tey

Bankan Tey Dogon, at first called Walo-Kumbe Dogon after the two main villages it is spoken in, also known as Walo and Walonkore, is a divergent, recently described Dogon language spoken in Mali. It was first reported online by Roger Blench, who reports that it is "clearly related to Nanga", which is only known from one report from 1953.

A third village investigated at the time, Been, speaks a related but lexically distinct form, Ben Tey Dogon.

== Sources ==
- Blench, Roger (2005). "A survey of Dogon languages in Mali: Overview". OGMIOS: Newsletter of Foundation for Endangered Languages. 3.02 (26): 14–15..
- Hochstetler, J. Lee; Durieux, J.A.; E.I.K. Durieux-Boon (2004). Sociolinguistic Survey of the Dogon Language Area (PDF). SIL International.
