= Yanda Dogon =

Dogon language of Mali

Yanda
- Yanda Dom
- Region: Mali
- Native speakers: 2,000 (2005)
- Language family: Niger–Congo?: Dogon; Nanga?; Yanda

Language codes
- ISO 639-3: dym
- Glottolog: yand1257
- ELP: Yanda Dom

- People: Yanda Bɔlɔm
- Country: Yanda Dom

Yanda Dogon is a Dogon language spoken in Mali. It is reported to be lexically similar to Nanga, which is only known from one report from 1953.

== Sources ==
- Blench, Roger (2005). "A survey of Dogon languages in Mali: Overview". OGMIOS: Newsletter of Foundation for Endangered Languages. 3.02 (26): 14–15..
- Hochstetler, J. Lee; Durieux, J.A.; E.I.K. Durieux-Boon (2004). Sociolinguistic Survey of the Dogon Language Area (PDF). SIL International.
- Heath, Jeffrey (2017), A Grammar of Yanda Dom (Dogon, Mali), doi:10.17617/2.2586267, hdl:2027.42/139020
