= Mombo Dogon =

Language

Mombo
- Ejenge Dõ, Kolum So
- Region: Mali
- Native speakers: (c. 19,000 cited 1998)
- Language family: Niger–Congo?: Dogon; West; Mombo

Language codes
- ISO 639-3: dmb
- Glottolog: momb1254
- ELP: Mombo

Mombo Dogon is a Dogon language spoken in Mali. Helabo and Miambo are dialects.

Until c. 2005 Ampari was considered a dialect. However, while Ampari understand Mombo, this appears to be because they visit the area yearly, and the Mombo cannot understand Ampari.

In the village of Kema, the Mombo language is called Ambaleeŋge. It has been called Ejenge Dõ (Edyenge Dom, Idyoli Donge) or Kolum So in the literature. Ejenge Dõ is the Mombo word for 'Dogon language', from Éjé 'Dogon person'. Kolum So is the name used by the Donno So to the east. It means 'sunset dialects', and refers to the westernmost Dogon varieties, Mombo and Ampari. The Fulani name is Piniari (Pignari).
