= Tebul Dogon =

Dogon language of Mali

Tebul
- Tebul Ure
- Region: Mali
- Native speakers: 3,000 (2005)
- Language family: Niger–Congo?: Dogon; Tebul

Language codes
- ISO 639-3: dtu
- Glottolog: tebu1239
- ELP: Tebul Ure

The Tebul language, also known as Tebul Ure, is a Dogon language spoken in Mali by the Tebul U (Tebul people). It was first reported under this name online by Roger Blench, who erroneously reported that it appears to be the same as a language called Oru Yille in existing literature. This mistaken name instead means 'two words' in the Tebul language.

The language is divergent within the Dogon and may constitute its own branch of that family, though it shows some affinities with the western languages.

The Tebul people also use 'village sign', Tebul Sign Language, due to a relatively high incidence of deafness.

== Sources ==
- Blench, Roger (2005). "A survey of Dogon languages in Mali: Overview". OGMIOS: Newsletter of Foundation for Endangered Languages. 3.02 (26): 14–15..
- Blench, Dendo, & Douyon, 2005 (ms). Tebul Ure, a language of the Dogon group in Northern Mali and its affinities
- Hochstetler, J. Lee; Durieux, J.A.; E.I.K. Durieux-Boon (2004). Sociolinguistic Survey of the Dogon Language Area (PDF). SIL International.
