= Tebul Sign Language =

Deaf sign language of Mali

- Native to: Mali
- Region: Diankabou
- Native speakers: 500 (2007)
- Language family: village sign language, West African gestural area

Language codes
- ISO 639-3: tsy
- Glottolog: tebu1240
- ELP: Tebul Sign Language

Tebul Sign Language (French: Langue des signes de Tebul) is a village sign language of the village of Uluban in the Dogon region of Mali, among speakers of Tebul Dogon.

== See also ==
- Bamako Sign Language
