= Duleri Dogon =

Dogon language spoken in Mali

- Tiranige dige
- Region: Mali
- Native speakers: (4,200 cited 1998)
- Language family: Niger–Congo?: Dogon; West; Duleri Dogon

Language codes
- ISO 639-3: tde
- Glottolog: tira1258
- ELP: Tiranige Diga

Duleri Dogon or Duleri Dom, also known as Tiranige dige, is a Dogon language spoken in Mali.

== Sources ==
- Blench, Roger (2005). "A survey of Dogon languages in Mali: Overview". OGMIOS: Newsletter of Foundation for Endangered Languages. 3.02 (26): 14–15..
- Hochstetler, J. Lee; Durieux, J.A.; E.I.K. Durieux-Boon (2004). Sociolinguistic Survey of the Dogon Language Area (PDF). SIL International.
