= Nanga Dogon =

Dogon language spoken in Mali

Naŋa dama
- Naŋa tegu
- Region: Mali
- Native speakers: 3,000 (2009)
- Language family: Niger–Congo?: Dogon; Nanga–Walo; Naŋa dama

Language codes
- ISO 639-3: nzz
- Glottolog: nang1261
- ELP: Nanga

Naŋa dama, also known as Naŋa tegu, is a Dogon language spoken in Mali that is only known from one report from 1953. Roger Blench reports that its nearest relative is the recently described Walo–Kumbe Dogon, "with which it shares both lexicon and the feature that many nouns have a final -m." Hochstetler thinks they may be the same language. It may be close to Yanda Dogon (Blench) or Jamsai tegu (Hochstetler).
