= Bondum Dogon =

Dogon language of Mali

- Bondum Dom
- Region: Mali
- Native speakers: (25,000 cited 1998)
- Language family: Niger–Congo?: Dogon; North Plateau; Bondum Dogon

Language codes
- ISO 639-3: dbu
- Glottolog: bond1248
- ELP: Bondu So

The Bondum language, Bondum Dom, is a Dogon language spoken in Mali. It is closest to Dogul Dogon, though not enough for mutual intelligibility. Dialects are Kindjim and Nadjamba.

== Sources ==
- Blench, Roger (2005). "A survey of Dogon languages in Mali: Overview". OGMIOS: Newsletter of Foundation for Endangered Languages. 3.02 (26): 14–15..
- Hochstetler, J. Lee; Durieux, J.A.; E.I.K. Durieux-Boon (2004). Sociolinguistic Survey of the Dogon Language Area (PDF). SIL International.
