= Ampari Dogon =

Dogon language of Mali

Ampari
- Nyambeeŋge
- Region: Mali
- Native speakers: (5,200 cited 1998)
- Language family: Niger–Congo?: Dogon; West; Ampari–Penange; Ampari

Language codes
- ISO 639-3: aqd
- Glottolog: ampa1238
- ELP: Ampari

Ampari Dogon, also known as Ambange or Ampari kora, is a Dogon language spoken in Mali.

The language has been called Ejenge Dõ or Kolum So in the literature. However, there are two Ejenge groups, the Mombo and the Ampari. The Ampari understand Mombo but not vice versa; this appears to be learned intelligibility, since the Ampari visit Mombo yearly.

In the village of Flicko, people call themselves Nyamboli and their language Nyambeeŋge, but these terms vary regionally.
