= Dogul Dogon =

Dogon language of Mali

- Dogul Dom
- Region: Mali
- Native speakers: (16,000 cited 1998)
- Language family: Niger–Congo?: Dogon; North Plateau; Dogul Dogon

Language codes
- ISO 639-3: dbg
- Glottolog: dogu1235
- ELP: Dogul Dom

The Dogul language, Dogul Dom, is a Dogon language spoken in Mali. It is closest to Bondum Dogon, though not enough for mutual intelligibility.

== Sources ==
- Blench, Roger (2005). "A survey of Dogon languages in Mali: Overview". OGMIOS: Newsletter of Foundation for Endangered Languages. 3.02 (26): 14–15..
- Hochstetler, J. Lee; Durieux, J.A.; E.I.K. Durieux-Boon (2004). Sociolinguistic Survey of the Dogon Language Area (PDF). SIL International.
