= Tommo So =

Dogon language of Mali

- Tombo-So
- Pronunciation: /tɔ̀mmɔ̀ sɔ̀ɔ́/
- Native to: Mali
- Region: Région de Mopti
- Native speakers: 40,000-60,000 (2013)
- Language family: Niger-Congo: Dogon; Tommo So

Language codes
- ISO 639-3: dto
- Glottolog: tomm1242
- Location in Mali
- Coordinates: 14°20′N 3°25′W

Tommo So is a language spoken in the eastern part of Mali's Mopti Region. It is placed under the Dogon language family, a subfamily of the Niger-Congo language family.

There are approximately 60,000 speakers of Tommo So. Of the twelve Dogon languages, it is the second-most common. It is classed as a 6a (vigorous) language under Ethnologue's language status classifications—the language is "used for face-to-face communication by all generations and the situation is sustainable." Children are still acquiring Tommo So as their first language. Bambara and French (Mali's lingua franca and national language) are common second languages for Tommo So speakers, with the former being common among those that have spent time in other areas of Mali, and the latter being used to communicate in the classroom or with foreigners.

== Phonology ==
=== Vowels ===
Tommo So contains 17 vowel phonemes. There are seven basic vowels spanning four vowel heights and three vowel backnesses.

Basic Vowel Sounds
	Front	Back
High	i	u
High-mid	e	o
Low-mid	ɛ	ɔ
Low	a	

Besides the 7 basic vowels, Tommo So's vowel inventory includes their long counterparts and 3 nasalized long vowels. The placement of vowels in words does not affect their length—long vowels tend to be about 138ms long, and short vowels tend to be about 67 ms long. The nasalized vowels /iː^{n}/ and /uː^{n}/ are present in the language but occur infrequently and irregularly, and are not considered phonemic.

Full Vowel Inventory
Short	Long	Nasalized
i	ii	
e	ee	
ɛ	ɛɛ	ɛɛ^{n}
a	aa	aa^{n}
ɔ	ɔɔ	ɔɔ^{n}
o	oo	
u	uu	

=== Consonants ===
Tommo So contains 17 consonants. There are 5 places and 6 manners of articulation. Consonant length is contrastive—for example, [dɛ̀nnɛ́] and [dɛ̀nɛ́] are considered to be different words—the first means 'look for', and the second means 'spend the day'.

Consonant Inventory
	Bilabial		Alveolar		Alveolo-Palatal	Palatal	Velar		Glottal
Plosive	p	b	t	d			k	g	
Nasal	m		n			ɲ	ŋ		
Fricative			s						h
Affricate					dʑ				
Approximant	w					j			
Tap			ɾ						
Lateral approximant			l						

The consonant inventory includes the alveolo-palatal affricate [dʑ]—the consonant [ʑ] does not appear by itself. There are a few other consonants sounds that occur in consonant speech (such as [ʔ] and [tɕ]). However, these sounds occur only in ideophones, and are not considered part of Tommo So's consonant inventory.

=== Syllabic structure ===
There are eight syllable types in Tommo So: (C)V, (C)Vː (C)VR, (C)VC, N, NCV, NCVː, and CVV. N represents a nasal consonant, and R represents a sonorant. A (C)VC syllable must be followed by an onset identical to this coda. Some examples of these syllable structures are provided below.

Template	Example	Translation
V	ɛ̀.nɛ́	'goat'
Vː	íí	'house'
CV	gì.nɛ́	'child'
CVː	nàá	'cow'
VR	ém	'milk'
CVR	nǎm	'sun'
CVC	sɔ́b.bɔ̀	'dry sowing'
N	ɲ́.yɛ́	'eat'
NCV	à.ndá	'udder'
NCVː	gà.mbáá	'some'
CVV	dɔ̀ɛ̀	'he arrived'

=== Tone ===
Tone is significant both lexically and grammatically. Tommo So contains two tones, high (H) and low (L). Based on an analysis of recorded words, the distribution and placement of H and L tones seem to be governed by a set of patterns that are relatively unpredictable for nouns, numerals, and adjectives, and predictable for verbs.

==== Lexical Tone ====
Almost all syllables have an associated H or L tone, and every stem must contain at least one H tone. Although tones are contrastive, there are very few minimal pairs that are only tonally distinctive. A few examples are listed below.

Tonal Minimal Pairs
/H/ tone		/LH/ tone	
náá	'mother'	nàá	'cow'
ííyé	'today'	ììyé	'honey'
ííyɛ́	'grave'	ììyɛ́	'moon'
dámmá	'village'	dàmmá	'hoe'
ísé	'empty'	ìsé	'dog'

==== Grammatical Tone ====
Tommo So, like other Dogon languages, uses tonal overlays. A stem's tones are overwritten by a pre-determined tone overlay depending on the context in which the stem appears. Verb phrases' tones are replaced based on inflectional morphology, and only affect the verb stem. As an example, main clauses' affirmative imperfect overlay is {HL}, and their negative imperfect overlay is {L}. Relative clauses' affirmative imperfect overlay does not change tones, and their negative imperfect overlay is {L}. Given the noun stem [jɔ̀bɔ́] ('run') of the /LH/ tone class, conjugation would result in the following.

Conjugation of [jɔ̀bɔ́] ('run')
		Main clause	Relative clause
Imperfective	Affirmative {HL}	jɔ́bɔ̀-dɛ̀	jɔ̀bɔ́-dɛ
Imperfective	Negative {L}	jɔ̀b-éélè	jɔ̀b-éélè

Noun phrases' tones are replaced based on the relationship between words in the noun phrase, and can affect multiple words. Although verb phrase tonal overlays are strictly defined for all verbs, noun phrase tonal overlays are dependent on the object in the noun phrase being possessed or not.

== Morphology ==
Tommo So is an agglutinative language. In general, when these morphemes are attached to each other, they retain their original form and meaning within the new word. Tommo So's morphology contains affixation, clitics, reduplication, and compounding.

=== Affixation ===
As an agglutinative language, the affixation of morphemes plays a major role in Tommo So's morphology. Almost all of the language's bound morphemes are used as suffixes—prefixes are only seen in the form of reduplication, when used for deadjectival nominalization.

Tommo So contains five verbal derivational suffixes, listed below.

Purpose	Suffix	Example
factitive	-ndɛ́	yɛ̀ → yɛ̀-ndɛ́ see {} see-FACT 'see' {} 'watch'
reversive	-ílɛ́	dɛ̀bɛ́ → dɛ̀b-ílɛ́ {get stuck} {} {get stuck}-REV {'get stuck'} {} {'get unstuck'}
transitive	-írɛ́	
mediopassive	-íyɛ́	pɛ́ndɛ́ → pɛ́nd-íyɛ́ {make tight} {} {make tight}-MP {'make tight'} {} {'get crowded'}
causative	-mɔ́	

There are some cases in which the 'reversive' suffix -ílɛ́ does not seem to contain a reversive meaning. For example, the word yàmá means 'be ruined', but the word 'yàm-ílɛ́' means 'ruin.' Some derivational suffixes just happen to carry "no discernable meaning at all."

Tommo So does not contain much nominal morphology—the only two meaningful suffix types that attach to nouns are those that implement a human/non-human system and the diminutive suffix -ý. In the case below, íí is an allomorph of -ý.

yàá-m=mbe
female-HUM.PL=PL
'women'

ɛ́njɛ́ íí
chicken DIM
'chick'

=== Clitics ===
There are a few clitics in Tommo So, including a plural marker =mbe and a definite marker =gɛ (an example showing both is given below). Clitics are always attached to the end of an entire noun phrase rather than the noun itself.

Plural (noun)

yàá-m=mbe
female-HUM.PL=PL
'women'

→
Plural (noun phrase)

yàà-m kómmó=gɛ=mbe
female-HUM.PL skinny=def=PL
'the skinny women'

In general, clitics are always attached to the end of a stem, and never the beginning.

=== Reduplication ===
Reduplication is used for different purposes in Tommo So's morphology. The first is deadjectival nominalization, and the second is adjectival distribution.

==== Deadjectival nominalization ====
The process of nominalizing an adjective requires for the adjective stem to be reduplicated, either in part or in whole. At minimum, the first syllable is reduplicated. However, in the case of multisyllabic adjectives, up to the entire word can be reduplicated. A tone shift also occurs during this process. Regardless of how much of the original word is duplicated, the resultant noun has the same meaning.

Adjective stem	Noun	Translation of noun
kúnɔ́	kù~kùnɔ́ kùnù~kùnɔ́	'thickness'
wánnu	wà~wànnú wànnù~wànnú	'width'
kábárá	kà~kàbàrá kàbà~kàbàrá kàbàrà~kàbàrá	'flatness'

==== Adjectival distribution ====
The reduplication of an adjective is used to distribute its meaning across a given number of objects.

Gìnè ɛ̀su~ɛ̀sù néé-go=sɛ-m.
house pretty~pretty two-ADV=have-1SG
'I have two very pretty houses.'

Jàà ɛ́lɛ́lu~ɛ̀lɛ̀lù néé-go ɲ̀y-ɛ̀-m.
meal sweet~sweet two-ADV eat-PFV.L-1SG
'I ate two good meals.'

=== Compounding ===
There are two types of compounding in Tommo So: nominal compounding and adjectival compounding.

==== Nominal compounding ====
About a third of the known lexicon of Tommo So consists of nominal compounds, of which most are right-headed. Some examples of nominal compounds are provided below.

nɛ̀m táá
salt door
'slab of salt'

bòmbòm yòògú
candy sap
'chewing gum'

hɔ̀ɔ̀làl bàŋáá
trust owner
'trustworthiness'

==== Bahuvrihi compounding ====
Bahuvrihi compounding in Tommo So occurs when a complex noun is created by attaching an adjective to the end of a noun.

ǹdɛ̀ áŋá wɛ̂y
person mouth light
'gossipy person'

àn-nà-y dɔ́lɔ́ póò
male-HUM.SG-DIM testicle fat
'boy with large testicles'

== Syntax ==
=== Basic word order ===
Tommo So's basic word order is subject-object-verb (SOV). Examples of this are shown below.

Mòòmíyó mí=ɲ̀ támbá-gú=sɛ.
scorpion 1SG.PRO=OBJ strike-ppl=have
'The scorpion is striking me.'

Mí áí=ɲ́ màŋgóró ób-aa=be-m.
1SG.PRO friend=OBJ mango give-PFV=be.PST-1SG
'I gave my friend a mango.'

== Bibliography ==
- McPherson, Laura (2013). A grammar of Tommo So. Berlin; Boston: De Gruyter Mouton. ISBN 9783110301076. OCLC 867630968.
