= Jamsai Dogon =

Dogon language of Mali

Jamsay
- Dyamsay tegu
- Region: Mali, Burkina Faso
- Native speakers: (130,000 cited 1998)
- Language family: Niger–Congo?: Dogon; Plains Dogon; Jamsay

Language codes
- ISO 639-3: djm
- Glottolog: jams1239

Jamsay Dogon is one of the Dogon languages spoken in Mali, and the only one spoken in Burkina Faso apart from a few villages of Tomo Kan. It is one of the plains languages spoken in Dogon villages outside the Bandiagara Escarpment (the cliffs that the Dogon ethnic group is usually associated with). It is a major language in Koro, at the south end of the escarpment, and stretches as far north as Douentza. It is not mutually intelligible with other Plains Dogon languages, but is widely known as the prestige variety due to its use as the language of radio broadcasts. Dialects are Domno tegu, Gono tegu, Bama tegu, and Guru tegu; their degree of mutual intelligibility has not been recorded. Domno is the standard dialect, and considered the purest; Guru (Koro) is the dialect of that town.

== Phonology ==
=== Consonants ===
		Labial	Alveolar	Palatal	Velar	Glottal
Nasal		m	n	ɲ	ŋ	
Plosive/ Affricate	voiceless	p	t	t͡ʃ	k	(ʔ)
Plosive/ Affricate	voiced	b	d	d͡ʒ	g	
Fricative		(f)	s	(ʃ)	(ɣ)	(h)
Approximant/ Tap	oral	w	ɾ	j		
Approximant/ Tap	nasalized	w̃	ɾ̃	j̃		
Approximant/ Tap	lateral		l			

- /ɡ/ can be realized as a fricative [ɣ] between /a ɔ/.
- /f h ʔ/ are found in loanwords.
- /ʃ/ may occur as an allophone of /s/ when preceding /i/.

=== Vowels ===
	Front			Central			Back		
	short	long	nasal	short	long	nasal	short	long	nasal
Close	i	iː	ĩː				u	uː	ũː
Close-mid	e	eː	ẽː				o	oː	õː
Open-mid	ɛ	ɛː	ɛ̃ː				ɔ	ɔː	ɔ̃ː
Open				a	aː	ãː			

Nasal vowels in Jamsai Dogon are inherently long.

== Phrases ==
Jamsai gets its name from a common response to a greeting: Jam sai, or "peace only." A typical Jam sai greeting goes like this:

A: Jam now (do you have peace in the morning?)
B: Jam sai (peace only)
A: Kanya now (do your people have peace in the morning?)
B: Jam sai
A: Taardé

The greeting then repeats, with B asking all the same questions of A. "Taardé" is the way of the question asker telling the askee that he's done with his inquiry.

A few other common phrases and words:

- E nam sayoba? (Do your people have peace?)
- Guinea nissama? (Did you sleep well?)
- Nya nyé (Eat!)
- Ejuko (Good)
- Ejila (Bad)
- ni inim (Bathe—literally to put water on oneself)
- Ewé (market)
- Yayerrem (I will be right back—literally "I am coming there")
- miten (friend. Can also mean boyfriend/girlfriend)

== Sources ==
- Heath, Jeffrey (unpublished) Jamsay Grammar. University of Michigan, Ann Arbor
- Blench, Roger (2005). "A survey of Dogon languages in Mali: Overview". OGMIOS: Newsletter of Foundation for Endangered Languages. 3.02 (26): 14–15..
- Hochstetler, J. Lee; Durieux, J.A.; E.I.K. Durieux-Boon (2004). Sociolinguistic Survey of the Dogon Language Area (PDF). SIL International.
