= Western Plains Dogon =

Dialect group

- Kan Dogon
- Region: Mali, Burkina Faso
- Native speakers: (260,000 cited 1998)
- Language family: Niger–Congo?: Dogon; Plains; Western Plains Dogon
- Dialects: Tomo Kan; Tengu Kan; Togo Kan

Language codes
- ISO 639-3: Either: dtm – Tomo Kan dtk – Tene Kan
- Glottolog: west2508

The Dogon dialects of the western plains below the Bandiagara Escarpment in Mali are mutually intelligible. They are sometimes called the Kan Dogon because they use the word kan (also spelled kã) for varieties of speech. The dialects are:

- Tomo kã
- Teŋu kã
- Togo kã

The latter two are traditionally subsumed under the name Tene kã (Tene Kan, Tene Tingi), but Hochstetler separates them because the three varieties are about equidistant.

There are a quarter million speakers of these dialects, about evenly split between Tomo Kan and Tene Kan, making this the most populous of the Dogon languages. There are a few Tomo-speaking villages just across the border in Burkina Faso.

== Phonology ==
=== Consonants ===
Tomo-Kan consonants
| | | Labial | Alveolar | Palatal | Velar | Glottal |
|---|---|---|---|---|---|---|
| Stop/ Affricate | voiceless | p | t | t͡ʃ | k | ʔ |
| Stop/ Affricate | voiced/nasal | b | d | d͡ʒ | g | ʔ̃ |
| Fricative | voiceless | (ɸ) | s | | | h |
| Fricative | voiced | | (z) | | | |
| Nasal | | m | n | ɲ | ŋ | |
| Tap | | | ɾ | | | |
| Approximant | central | w | l | j | | |
| Approximant | nasal | w̃ | | (j̃) | | |

- Consonant germination also occurs frequently among sounds [kː lː nː tː].
- /z/ can only occur among loanwords.
- /ɸ/ is interchangeable with /h/.

Togo-Kan consonants
| | | Labial | Alveolar | Palatal | Velar | Glottal |
|---|---|---|---|---|---|---|
| Stop/ Affricate | voiceless | p | t | (t͡ʃ) | k | (ʔ) |
| Stop/ Affricate | voiced | b | d | d͡ʒ | g | |
| Fricative | | (f) | s | | (ɣ) | (h) |
| Nasal | | m | n | ɲ | ŋ | |
| Tap | central | | ɾ | | | |
| Tap | nasal | | ɾ̃ | | | |
| Approximant | central | w | l | j | | |
| Approximant | nasal | w̃ | | j̃ | | |

- Consonant sound /t͡ʃ/ only rarely occurs and in almost absent.
- Consonant sounds [z ʃ ʒ] are absent, except in loanwords.
- /ɡ/ can be realized as a fricative [ɣ] between vowel sounds /a ɔ/.
- Sounds [f h] only occur from loanwords, and are interchangeable.
- Glottal sound [ʔ] can only occur as an element in some reduplicated forms of vowel-initial words, or between vowels within a word.

=== Vowels ===
| | Oral | | Nasal | |
| | Front | Back | Front | Back |
|---|---|---|---|---|
| Close | i iː | u uː | ĩ ĩː | ũ ũː |
| Close-mid | e eː | o oː | ẽ ẽː | õ õː |
| Open-mid | ɛ ɛː | ɔ ɔː | ɛ̃ ɛ̃ː | ɔ̃ ɔ̃ː |
| Open | a aː | | ã ãː | |

- In Tomo Kan, an extra central vowel sound [ʉ] is also attested possibly as a result of /i/ preceding a nasalised segment or a /u/. It may also regularly be pronounced as [u] as well.
