= Roger Blench =

British anthropologist (born 1953)

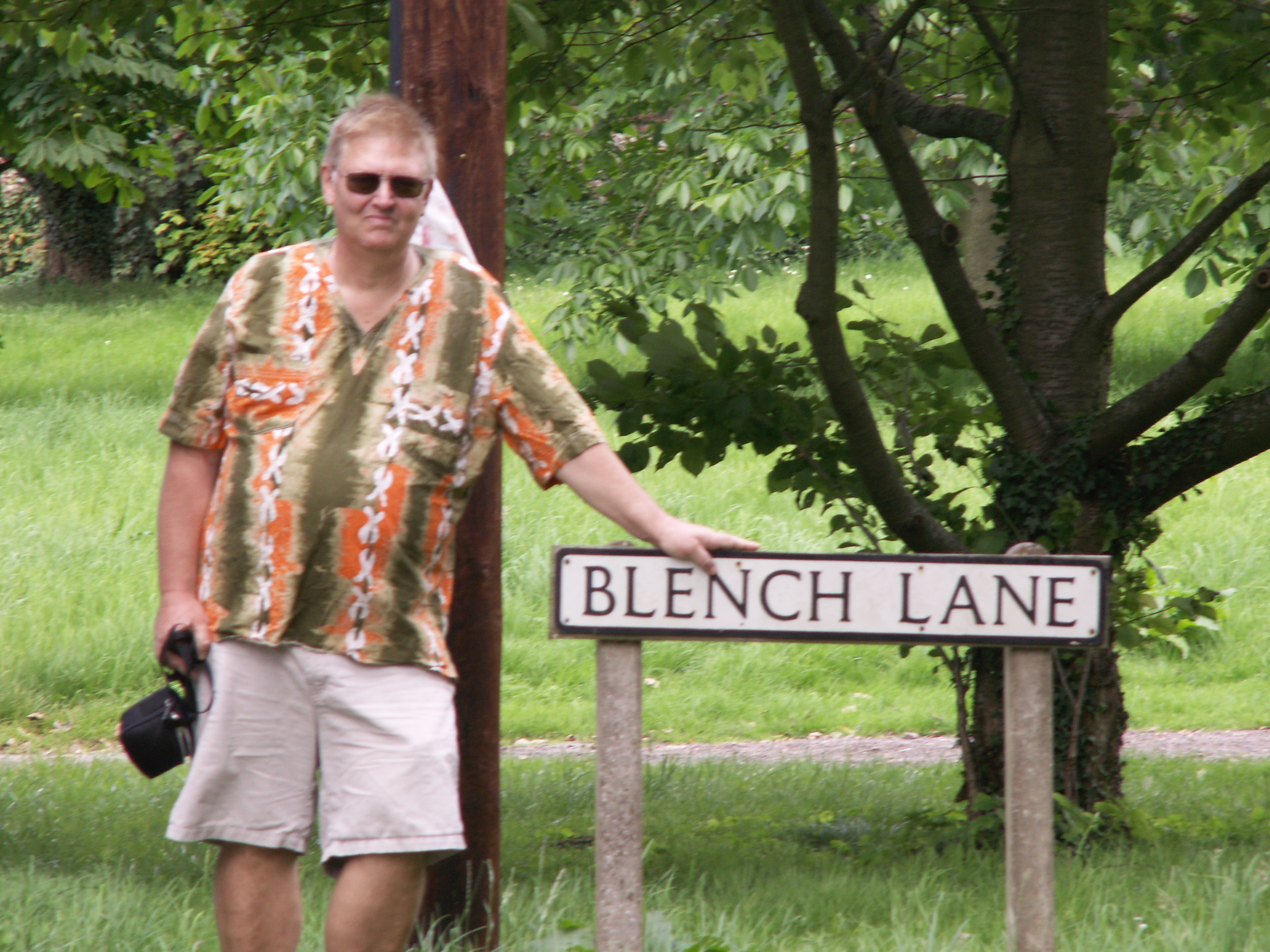
- Born: Roger Marsh Blench; August 1, 1953 (age 73)
- Education: Cambridge University (Ph.D.)
- Scientific career
- Fields: Historical linguistics, African languages, Southeast Asian languages, Anthropology
- Website: rogerblench.info

Roger Marsh Blench (born 1 August 1953) is a British linguist, ethnomusicologist and development anthropologist. He has an M.A. and a Ph.D. from the University of Cambridge and is based in Cambridge, England. He researches, publishes, and works as a consultant.

== Career ==
Blench is known for his wide-ranging interests and has made contributions to African linguistics, Southeast Asian linguistics, anthropology, ethnomusicology, ethnobotany, and various other related fields. He has done significant research on the Niger–Congo, Nilo-Saharan, and Afroasiatic families, as well as the Arunachal languages. Additionally, Blench has published extensively on the relationship between linguistics and archaeology. Blench is currently engaged in a long-term project to document the languages of central Nigeria. He has also expressed concern about ranching in Nigeria.

Blench collaborated with the late Professor Kay Williamson, who died in January 2005, and is now a trustee of the Kay Williamson Educational Foundation, which exists both to publish the unpublished material left by Kay Williamson and to promote the study of Nigerian languages. A series of publications supported by the trust is under way with Rüdiger Köppe Verlag in Cologne.

Blench has also conducted research and evaluations of international development activities worldwide, as a consultant and research fellow of the Overseas Development Institute in London.

== Selected publications ==
- David Henry Crozier; R. Blench; Keir Hansford (1992). An index of Nigerian languages. Nigerian Educational Research and Development Council. Language Development Centre, University of Ilorin. Dept. of Linguistics & Nigerian Languages, Summer Institute of Linguistics. Summer Institute of Linguistics. ISBN 0-88312-611-7.
- Roger Blench; Matthew Spriggs (1997). Archaeology and Language IV: Language Change and Cultural Transformation. Psychology Press. ISBN 0-415-11760-7.
- Roger Blench; Matthew Spriggs (2 October 2012). Archaeology and Language II: Archaeological Data and Linguistic Hypotheses. Routledge. ISBN 978-0-415-11761-6.
- Archaeology and Language III: Artefacts, Language and Texts. ISBN 0-415-10054-2.
- Roger Blench; Matthew Spriggs (1997). Language Change and Cultural Transformation. ISBN 978-0-415-11786-9.
- Blench, Roger; Spriggs, Matthew, eds. (28 August 1997). Theoretical and Methodological Orientations. Archaeology and Language. Vol. 1. London; New York: Routledge. ISBN 0415117607. LCCN 96044969.
- Blench, Roger; Spriggs, Matthew, eds. (1998). Archaeological Data and Linguistic Hypotheses. Archaeology and Language. Vol. 2. London; New York: Routledge. ISBN 0415117615. LCCN 96044969.
- Blench, Roger; Spriggs, Matthew, eds. (1997). Artefacts, Languages and Texts. Archaeology and Language. Vol. 3. London; New York: Routledge. ISBN 0415100542. LCCN 96044969.
- Blench, Roger; Spriggs, Matthew, eds. (1999). Language Change and Cultural Transformation. Archaeology and Language. Vol. 4. London; New York: Routledge. ISBN 0415117860. LCCN 96044969.
- 2000. Blench, R. M. & MacDonald, K. C., eds. The Origin and Development of African Livestock. London: University College Press.
- Laurent Sagart; Roger Blench; Alicia Sanchez-Mazas (2005). The Peopling of East Asia: Putting Together Archaeology, Linguistics and Genetics. Psychology Press. ISBN 978-0-415-32242-3.
- Blench, Roger (2006). Archaeology, language, and the African past. Altamira Press. ISBN 978-0-7591-0465-5.
- Sanchez-Mazas, Alicia; Blench, R. M. et al., eds. 2008. Human Migrations in Continental East Asia and Taiwan: matching archaeology, linguistics and genetics. London: Routledge.
- Blench, R. M. 1985. "Social Determinants of the Use of Speech-Surrogate Systems in Two Nigerian Societies : A Comparative Study of Speech and Music among the Nupe and Gbari Peoples." Apollo - University of Cambridge Repository. doi:10.17863/CAM.20118.
