= Ounjougou =

Archaeological site in Mali

Coordinates: 14.6333°N 3.2333°W

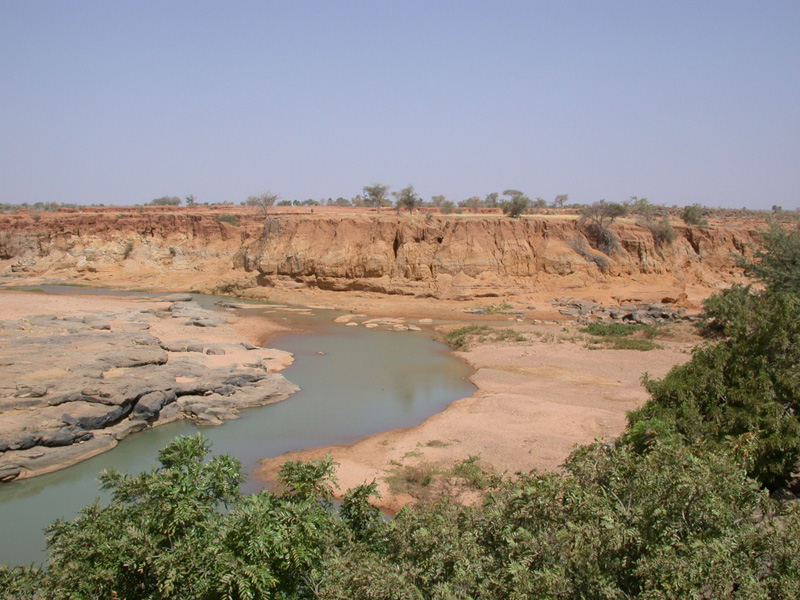
- Partial view of the Ounjougou archaeological sites complex, in the Yamé valley, near Bandiagara (Dogon Country, Mali)

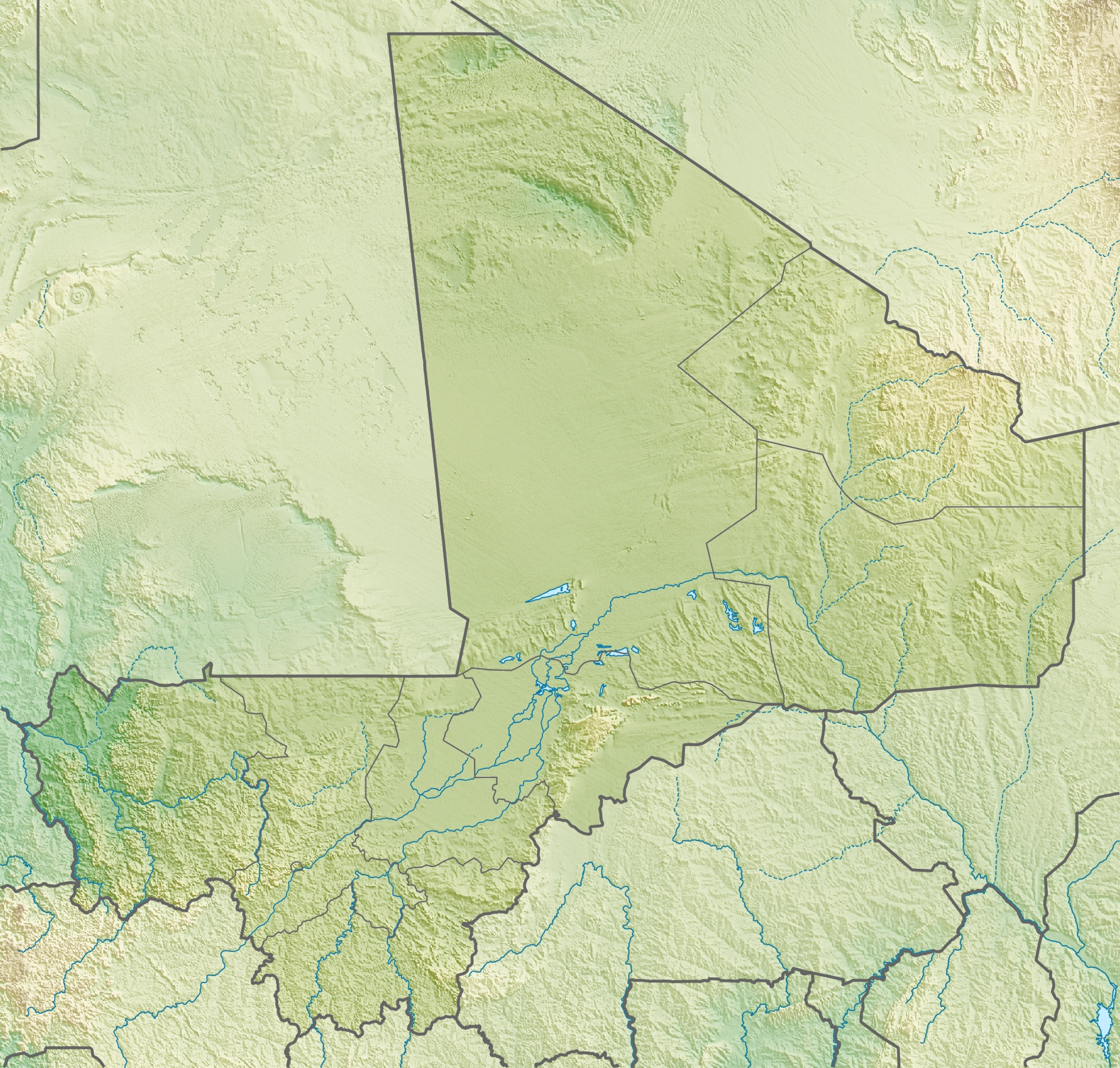
- Location in Mali
- Type: archaeological complex
- Region: Bandiagara Plateau

Site notes
- Excavation dates: 1997-2009

Ounjougou is the name of a lieu-dit found in the middle of an important complex of archaeological sites in the Upper Yamé Valley on the Bandiagara Plateau, in Dogon Country, Mali. The Ounjougou archaeological complex consists of over a hundred sites. The analysis of many layers rich in archaeological and botanical remains has enabled establishment of a major chronological, cultural and environmental sequence crucial to understand settlement patterns in the Inland Niger Delta and West Africa. Ounjougou has yielded the earliest pottery found in Africa, and is believed to be one of the earliest regions (along with East Asia) in which the independent development of pottery occurred.

== Geographic and historical context of research ==
A recent transformation of the Yamé River made possible the discovery of the archaeological richness of Ounjougou. Indeed, a major flood considerably changed the configuration of the watercourse by redesigning its much lower path, leading to strong regressive erosion in the surrounding Quaternary formations. This vertical incision, responsible for spectacular gullies now visible in the area, has created natural sections exceeding 10 meters in height. The stratigraphic sequence revealed contains many archaeological layers attributable to a broad chronological range extending from the Lower Paleolithic to the present. The Ounjougou sequence is also notable for a series of extremely rich Holocene layers rich in well-preserved organic remains (charcoal, pollen, leaves, seeds and wood), offering the opportunity to directly address the relationship between human occupations and climatic and environmental variability throughout a long sequence.

Ounjougou was first discovered in 1994. Research carried out at the Ounjougou site complex between 1997 and 2004 led to the proposal of an initial scenario for the history of human settlement in the Dogon Country which, however, still contained several archaeological or sedimentary gaps. From 2005, research was progressively expanded to the Bandiagara Cliff and the Séno Plain with the aim of testing the settlement model defined at Ounjougou and understanding the different gaps shown in the Yamé Valley sequence. Many Pleistocene and Holocene sites were discovered. Fieldwork in the Dogon Country was interrupted in 2011 due to increasingly unstable security conditions.

Today, the term Ounjougou is associated with the research undertaken within the international program "Human population and palaeoenvironment in Africa", created in 1997. This program is coordinated at the University of Geneva (Switzerland) by the laboratory Archéologie et Peuplement de l'Afrique at the Anthropology Unit, Department of Genetics and Evolution.

== The archaeological and environmental sequence at Ounjougou ==
=== Pleistocene ===
A high resolution Palaeolithic sequence could be established at Ounjougou, in particular due to 50 optically stimulated luminescence (OSL) dates in strict association with the geomorphological analysis of the formations. Moreover, some sedimentary gaps observed in the Ounjougou Pleistocene sequence appear to coincide with abrupt Heinrich climatic events during isotopic stage 3 (H5 and H4).

The earliest evidence of human occupation is seen at several sites in the complex in the form of a lithic industry composed of quartzitic sandstone polyhedrals and sub-spheroids associated with worked cobbles (Soriano et al. 2010). The technological and typological aspects of these artifacts suggest an early phase of the Palaeolithic and have been observed in stratigraphic context in lenses of coarse sands indurated with iron oxide adhering to bedrock. An OSL date of the Final Middle Pleistocene, around 180,000 years, was obtained for the deposits overlying these formations, forming a terminus ante quem for this lithic industry. Its technical characteristics, however, suggest an age of at least 500,000 years ago. Although having widespread archaeological visibility, the Acheulean has until now been absent in the Ounjougou zone and the Dogon Country in general. This may indicate the existence in West Africa of regions unfrequented by Acheulean populations, although well represented in neighboring regions.

All of the other Pleistocene lithic industries at Ounjougou are chronologically associated with the Middle Palaeolithic. A Levallois core with preferential removals, found isolated in stratigraphic context, is the first evidence for the Middle Paleolithic at Ounjougou. The OSL date on the context places this core around 150,000 BP during the Late Middle Pleistocene. Middle Palaeolithic occupations in the Ounjougou zone, all open-air sites, become even more common during the Upper Pleistocene: 25 different typo-technological groups were identified between 100,000 and 22,000 BP, with a particular concentration during isotopic stage 3 between 50,000 and 30,000 BP). The industries between 100,000 and 20,000 BP are extremely diverse. The appearance of blade production around 65,000 BP, followed by discoidal reduction around 60,000 BP, the appearance of foliate bifacial pieces around 50,000 BP and the disappearance of Levallois technique around 30,000 BP are the most notable events during the sequence. In the Middle Paleolithic sequence we also note the occurrence of a quartz cobble industry with characteristics comparable to an early Palaeolithic. The study of several sites at Ounjougou has also enabled description of a new industry with massive tools (rabots) and pieces obtained by bipolar-on-anvil percussion. The existence of this kind of assemblage was subsequently confirmed by the excavation of a rock shelter on the Bandiagara escarpment. The diversity of Middle Paleolithic industries and their succession without obvious logic suggests regular renewal of human groups in the region. Between 20,000 and 10,000 BP we then observe a significant hiatus, largely due to the dry Ogolian period.

=== Holocene ===
==== Early Holocene (>9500 BC-6750 BC) ====
At the onset of the Holocene, pottery appears early at Ounjougou, during the first half of the 10th millennium BC. The region was then confronted with the return of more humid conditions linked to a rapid return of the monsoons after the Younger Dryas and the development of an open grassland savanna on the Bandiagara Plateau. In this context, populations made pottery characterized especially by small bowls and imprinted décors. The appearance of pottery at Ounjougou is associated with a small bifacial point lithic industry. These innovations are quite likely linked to environmental changes during the establishment of tropical savannas during the Early Holocene, the new composition of hunted fauna that resulted and the development of edible wild grasses. This phase thus probably coincides with the establishment of a form of proto-agricultural economy, consisting of a strategy of selective and intensive gathering of grasses. In the layers dated to the 8th mill. BC, the pottery is also associated with grinding materials (grindstones and crushers). This occupation phase at Ounjougou was thus associated with an early Neolithic.

In the 10th millennium BCE, Niger-Congo speakers developed pyrotechnology and employed subsistence strategy at Ounjougou, Mali. Prior to 9400 BCE, Niger-Congo speakers independently created and used matured ceramic technology (e.g., pottery, pots) to contain and cook grains (e.g., Digitaria exilis, pearl millet); ethnographically and historically, West African women have been the creators of pottery in most West African ceramic traditions and their production of ceramics is closely associated with creativity and fertility. Amid the tenth millennium BCE, microlith-using West Africans migrated into and dwelt in Ounjougou alongside earlier residing West Africans in Ounjougou. Among two existing cultural areas, earlier residing West Africans in Ounjougou were of a cultural area encompassing the Sahara region (e.g., Tenere, Niger/Chad; Air, Niger; Acacus, Libya/Algeria; Tagalagal, Niger; Temet, Niger) of Africa and microlith-using West Africans were of a cultural area encompassing the forest region of West Africa.

Following the Ogolian period, between the late 10th millennium BCE and early 9th millennium BCE, the creators of the Ounjougou pottery – the earliest pottery in Africa – migrated, along with their pottery, from Ounjougou, Mali into the Central Sahara. Whether or not Ounjougou ceramic culture spread as far as Bir Kiseiba, Egypt, which had pottery that resembled Ounjougou pottery, had implements used for grinding like at Ounjougou, and was followed by subsequent ceramic cultures (e.g., Wadi el Akhdar, Sarurab, Nabta Playa), remains to be determined. The emergence and expansion of ceramics in the Sahara may be linked with the origin of both the Round Head and Kel Essuf rock art, which occupy rockshelters in the same regions (e.g., Djado, Acacus, Tadrart) as well as have a common resemblance (e.g., traits, shapes). In the Central Sahara, the Kel Essuf Period and Round Head Period were followed by the Pastoral Period. As a result of increasing aridification of the Green Sahara, Central Saharan hunter-gatherers and cattle herders may have used seasonal waterways as the migratory route taken to the Niger River and Chad Basin of West Africa.

==== Middle Holocene (6750-3300 BC) ====
In general, the hydrographic functioning of the Yamé Valley during the Middle Holocene clearly reflects the more humid climatic context of tropical Africa between 5300 and 3000 BC. The occupation of Ounjougou is marked by an important archaeological hiatus of about 2000 years after the end of the Early Holocene. A workshop specialized in quartzitic sandstone bifacially shaped points evidences a new occupation of the Yamé Valley between the 6th and 4th mill. BC.

==== Late Holocene (3300-400 BC) ====
At the Middle to Late Holocene transition, the Ounjougou zone was still part of a dense wooded Sudanian savanna associated with wetlands with Guinean affinities. Between 2600 and 2200 BC, the vegetal landscapes began to change, corresponding to a shift in vegetation zones reflecting a reduction in precipitation and a tendency toward more arid conditions. It is possible that during this same period, pastoral populations from the southern edge of the Sahara frequented the Yamé Valley during seasonal transhumance. Archaeological and botanical remains indicate that agricultural populations settled in the Yamé Valley between 1800 and 1400 BC in an arid climatic context but more humid than the present day. Between 1400 and 800 BC, agricultural populations developed and created farming villages or hamlets in the Yamé Valley. Some traits of the material culture of this period indicate links with several regions located in the confines of the Sahara and the Sahel, such as Gourma and Méma, reflecting a vast cultural current drawing at least part of its origins in the Dhars region in southeast Mauritania. The Neolithic at Ounjougou ends between 800 and 400 BC. The archaeological sequence is then interrupted by a hiatus of a few centuries, in part linked to more arid climatic conditions).

==== Terminal Holocene (400 BC-present) ====
From an archaeological perspective, the pre-Dogon period is dated at Ounjougou from the 4th century BC, but its floruit is situated between the 7th and 13th centuries AD. The ceramic and metallic assemblages for this period are well known due to the study of the site of Dangandouloun, a rock shelter with ritual function. In the near Bandiagara Escarpment, on the site of Dourou-Boro, a set of funerary structures built of clay coiling between the 3rd and 4th century and used until the 9th century AD is also attributed to pre-Dogon period. These findings, which have filled an important archaeological hiatus, question the concept of Toloy and Tellem cultures, studied in the caves of the cliff near Sangha.

The model which has been commonly accepted since the 1970s emphasizes the existence of a gap between the Toloy and Tellem entities, not only on the basis of a chronological hiatus and architectural differences, but also from important cultural differences revealed by the ceramic traditions. Recent data argue for a revision of this paradigm, which assumes a three-step population model (Toloy, Tellem and Dogon). Newly acquired information rather suggests that the Dogon country has been for the past two millennia an open region, integrating over the centuries many cultural features through migrant group, craftmen, objects and savoir-faire from multiple areas, such as the Mema and the Inland Niger delta in the northwest, the Gourma or Oudalan east, Burkina Faso or voltaic south eastern Senegal, without a complete turnover of the population.

Research at Ounjougou also showed links between the Bandiagara Plateau and the neighboring Mandé, Gur and Songhay ethnolinguistic spheres. Analysis of the surface ceramic assemblages from a dozen abandoned villages near Ounjougou and radiocarbon dating of one of these indicate that the Bandiagara Plateau was occupied by the Dogon from the 15th century AD. In addition, ethnohistorical surveys reveal several waves of settlement by different Dogon clans, followed by multiple relocations and reoccupations of villages linked to climatic, environmental or political causes, today reflected in a certain number of land conflicts. The Dogon populations have been the focus of many ethnohistorical and ethnoarchaeological studies, especially regarding the different ceramic traditions and metallurgical production.
