= Diankabou =

- Commune and village
- Location in Mali
- Coordinates: 14°35′N 3°05′W
- Country: Mali
- Region: Bandiagara Region
- Cercle: Koro Cercle

Population (1998)
  - Total: 14,760
- Time zone: UTC+0 (GMT)

Diankabou (Jàkáw) is a village and commune and seat of the Cercle of Koro in the Bandiagara Region of Mali. In 1998 the commune had a population of 14,760.

Diankabou is a large village situated in the plains between Bamba and Madougou. The village has large ponds with water lilies. Jamsay Dogon is spoken in Diankabou. A weekly Friday market is held in the village. Local surnames are Pudiougo, Guindo, Dara, and Teli.
