= Gangafani and Yoro massacres =

2019 massacre in Mali

- Part of Mali War
- Location: near Gangafani and Yoro, Koro Cercle, Mali
- Date: June 17, 2019
- Deaths: 41
- Victim: Dogon civilians
- Perpetrator: Fulani militants

On June 17, 2019, ethnic Fulani militiamen attacked Dogon civilians in the villages of Gangafani and Yoro, in Koro Cercle, Mali, killing 41 people.

== Prelude ==
A week prior to the massacre, Fulani herdsmen killed over 35 Dogon civilians in the village of Sobane Da, also in Koro Cercle. In response, the Malian army arrested dozens of Fulani herdsmen in the area, accusing them of perpetrating the massacre. A survivor of the Gangafani and Yoro massacre stated that the assailants told him that the massacre was retaliation for residents of the villages giving information about the Sobane Da perpetrators to the Malian and Burkinabe armies.

== Massacre ==
The massacre began on the evening of June 17, when around a hundred armed men on motorbikes attacked the villages. A survivor of the attack, Abdoulaye Goro, stated in an interview that around 40 Fulani militants intercepted his vehicle while he was on his way to his father's funeral. The militants forced everyone out of the cars, and brought them through the bush to a location with around 100 other people. The militants were only looking for people from Yoro and Gangafani. Those that were brought aside and shot. Goro, having not been from the villages, was released afterward.

The Malian army sent out several patrol groups in the days following the massacre, with one being ambushed on June 18 near Banguimalam.

== Aftermath ==
Goundjou Poudiougou, the municipal chancellor in Dinangourou, Koro Cercle, stated that the perpetrators were likely jihadists because they burned and gutted bodies while shouting "Allahu akbar", the modus operandi of several jihadist groups. Adama Dionko, the chairman of the Collective Association of Dogon People, corroborated Poudiougou's claims, stating that the perpetrators of the Gangafani and Yoro massacre were the same ones who perpetrated the Sobane Da massacre. An internal UN document later assessed the massacre was perpetrated by Fulani militants.

On June 18, the Malian prosecutor for war crimes gave a provisional death toll of 14 dead. That same day, an anonymous military source and local officials told AFP 40 people were killed. The mayor of Yoro, Issiaka Ganame, stated that 41 people were killed, including 17 from Gangafani and 24 in Yoro. Abdoulaye Goro corroborated Ganame's claims, stating he saw around twenty dead bodies in Yoro and 17 in Gangafani, also claiming that the perpetrators returned to Gangafani to kill a survivor who had tipped off Malian authorities.

The Malian government gave a toll of 38 killed, and later the UN gave a toll of 41 killed and 750 refugees.
