= Diankabou booby-trapped corpse explosion =

2019 improvised explosive device bombing in Mali

- Part of the Mali War
- Location: Gondogorou, Diankabou, Koro Cercle, Mopti Region, Mali
- Date: 26 February 2019
- Attack type: Booby-trap
- Weapon: Improvised explosive device
- Deaths: 18 (including Guindo)
- Injuries: 15
- Perpetrator: Unknown

On 26 February 2019, an attack involving a booby-trapped corpse occurred in Diankabou, Koro Cercle, Mopti Region, Mali, killing 17 people. This was the first attack involving a booby-trapped corpse throughout the Mali War. While no one claimed responsibility for the attack, local jihadists were suspected.

== Attack ==
On 22 February 2019, a Dogon man named Boukary Guindo disappeared after going out to get food for his livestock. After several days of searching by family members and other villagers, his corpse was found on 26 February. Family members held a funeral for Guindo in his town of Gondogourou, in Diankabou, Mali. His corpse turned out to be booby-trapped, and exploded as he was lowered into the ground.

17 people were killed, and 15 injured, according to a Koro Cercle official.
