= Barapireli =

Coordinates: 14°18′19″N 3°03′06″W

- Commune and village
- Interactive map of Barapireli
- Country: Mali
- Region: Bandiagara Region
- Cercle: Koro Cercle

Population (1998)
  - Total: 11,796
- Time zone: UTC+0 (GMT)

Barapireli is a village and commune and seat of the Cercle of Koro in the Bandiagara Region of Mali. In 1998 the commune had a population of 11,796.
