= Sangha Ogol Leye =

- Village
- Location in Mali
- Coordinates: 14°27′54″N 3°18′22″W
- Country: Mali
- Region: Mopti Region
- Cercle: Bandiagara Cercle
- Commune: Sangai
- Time zone: UTC+0 (GMT)

Sangha Ogol Leye is a village and seat of the commune of Sangha in the Cercle of Bandiagara in the Mopti Region of southern-central Mali. The village is one of a group that are located at the top of the Bandiagara Escarpment.
