= Dioungani ambush =

- Part of Mali War
| Date | January 22, 2020 |
| Location | Dioungani, Mopti Region, Mali |
| Result | Jihadist victory |

Belligerents
| Mali | Unknown jihadists |

Casualties and losses
| 6 killed Several injured | Unknown |

On January 22, 2020, six Malian soldiers were killed in an ambush by unknown jihadists in Dioungani, Mopti Region, Mali.

== Background ==
The main militant group active in Mali's central Mopti Region is Katiba Macina, a Fulani supremacist group that is part of Jama'at Nasr al-Islam wal Muslimin, a coalition of five jihadist groups in Mali. Prior to the attack, the Malian government launched several counter-terrorist operations in Mopti Region.

== Ambush and aftermath ==
The perpetrators ambushed the Malian soldiers at their post late at night on January 22. Fighting broke out between the two groups, lasting for several hours. Six soldiers were killed in the ambush, and several others were injured. In a statement, the Malian Armed Forces stated that the perpetrators were unknown. French counter-operations killed thirty jihadists in northern Mopti region on January 23.
