= Wazouba =

Wazouba may refer to:

- Wazouba, Mali, a village in the commune of Kassa, Mali, in the Cercle of Koro in the Mopti Region of Mali, inhabited by Dogon People
- Wazouba (dialect), one of the Dogon languages
