= Déguéré =

- Village
- Location in Mali
- Coordinates: 14°38′38″N 3°5′54″W
- Country: Mali
- Region: Mopti Region
- Cercle: Koro Cercle
- Commune: Bamba
- Time zone: UTC+0 (GMT)

Déguéré is a village and seat of the commune of Bamba in the Cercle of Koro in the Mopti Region of southern-central Mali. The village sits on the edge of the Dogon Plateau.

Déguéré (locally pronounced as Dégérè) is the administrative centre (chef-lieu) of Bamba village cluster. Déguéré village is located at the base of a mountain, and hosts a weekly Saturday market. There are fishing ponds near the village, and local villagers regularly partake in fishing festivals. Jamsay Dogon is spoken in the commune.
