= Berdosso =

- Village
- Country: Mali
- Region: Mopti Region
- Cercle: Koro Cercle
- Commune: Kassa
- Time zone: UTC+0 (GMT)

Berdosso is a village and seat of the Kassa in the Cercle of Koro in the Mopti Region of southern-central Mali.
