= Bondo, Mali =

Coordinates: 12°14′N 7°30′W

Bondo
- Commune and village
- Interactive map of Bondo
- Country: Mali
- Region: Bandiagara Region
- Cercle: Koro Cercle

Population (1998)
  - Total: 15,872
- Time zone: UTC+0 (GMT)

Bondo is a village and commune and seat of the Cercle of Koro in the Bandiagara Region of Mali. In 1998 the commune had a population of 15,872 In 2009, population was almost 20,000.

Some typical cultivated plants are millet, sorghum, corn, peanut and sesame.
