= Pel Maoudé =

- Commune and village
- Location in Mali
- Coordinates: 14°5′13″N 3°16′15″W
- Country: Mali
- Region: Bandiagara Region
- Cercle: Koro Cercle

Area
  - Total: 203 km^{2} (78 sq mi)

Population (2009 census)
  - Total: 13,727
  - Density: 67.6/km^{2} (175/sq mi)
- Time zone: UTC+0 (GMT)

Pel Maoudé is a village and rural commune and seat of the Cercle of Koro in the Bandiagara Region of Mali. The commune covers an area of approximately 203 square kilometers and includes 9 villages. In the 2009 census the commune had a population of 13,727.

Some typical cultivated plants are millet, peanut, black-eyed pea, fonio and sesame.
