= Mount Hombori =

Mountain in the Mopti Region, Mali

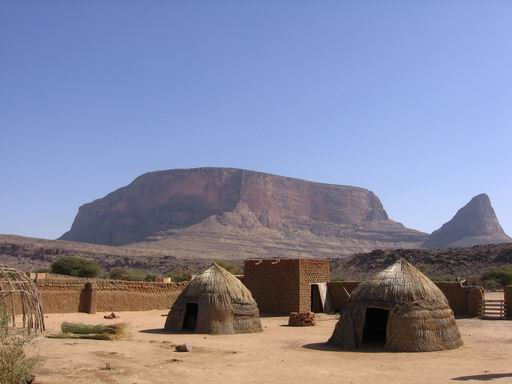
- Hombori Tondo

Highest point
- Elevation: 1,155 m (3,789 ft)
- Listing: Country high point
- Coordinates: 15°15′26″N 1°40′08″W

Geography
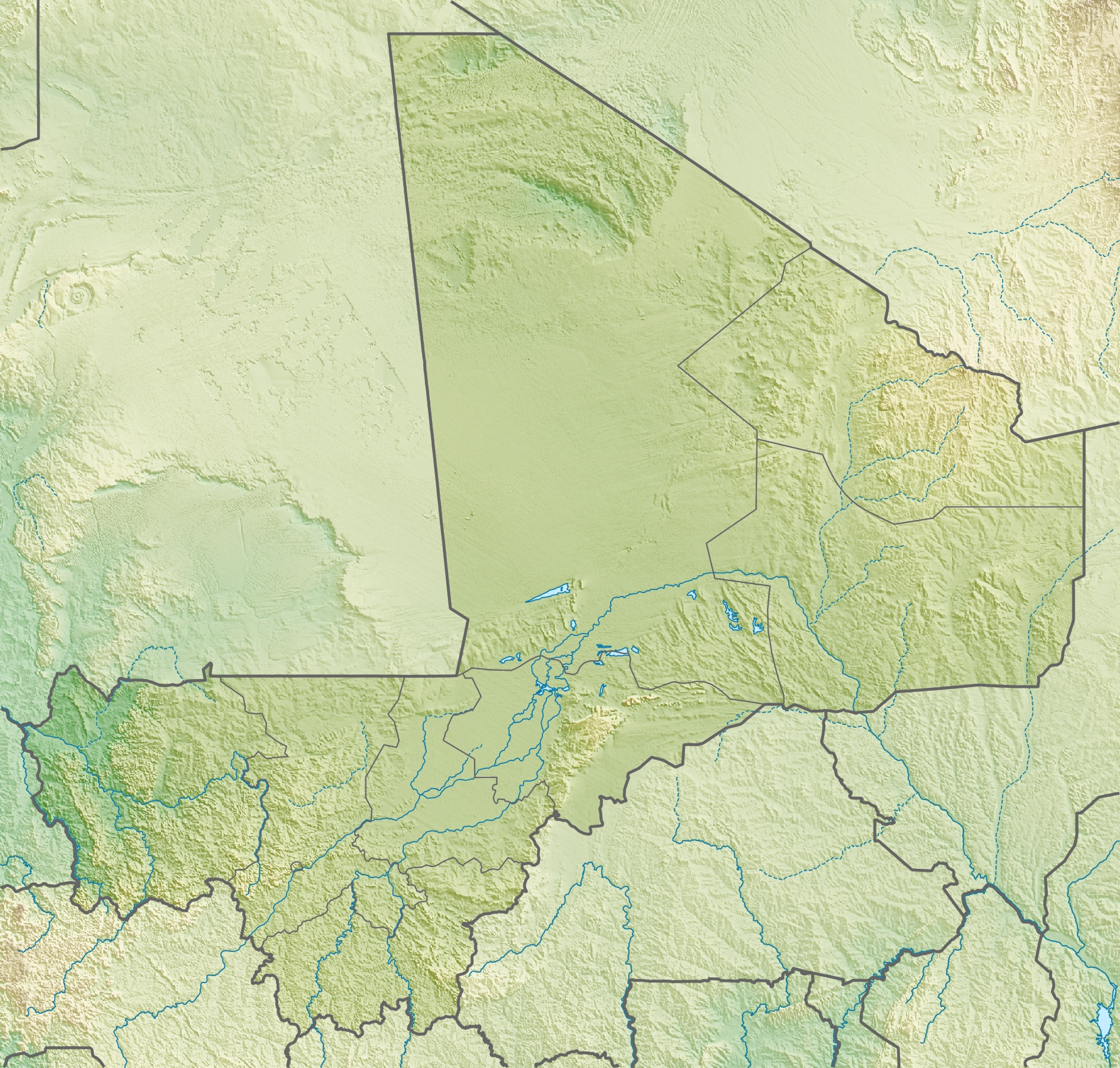
- Location within Mali
- Location: Mali

Mount Hombori (Hombori Tondo) is a mountain in Mali's Mopti Region, near the town of Hombori. At 1,155 meters, it is the highest point in Mali.

== Biodiversity ==
Mount Hombori is an important location for biodiversity in the Sahel, with 150 different species of plants along with various species of mammals, birds, reptiles, and insects on its two-square-kilometer plateau surface.

=== Flora ===
In contrast to the surface of the plateau, the surrounding 10,000 square kilometers of flatlands contain only about 200 different species of plants. A major contributing factor to Hombori's biodiversity is a lack of cattle grazing at the summit, which is protected on all sides by sheer cliffs. For many species of plants, including Bombax costatum, Hombori is the northernmost point of their distribution, demonstrating its importance as a haven for many southern species.

=== Fauna ===
Mount Hombori is home to some animal species, namely reptiles and birds, but also some species of mammals including the rock hyrax and olive baboon.

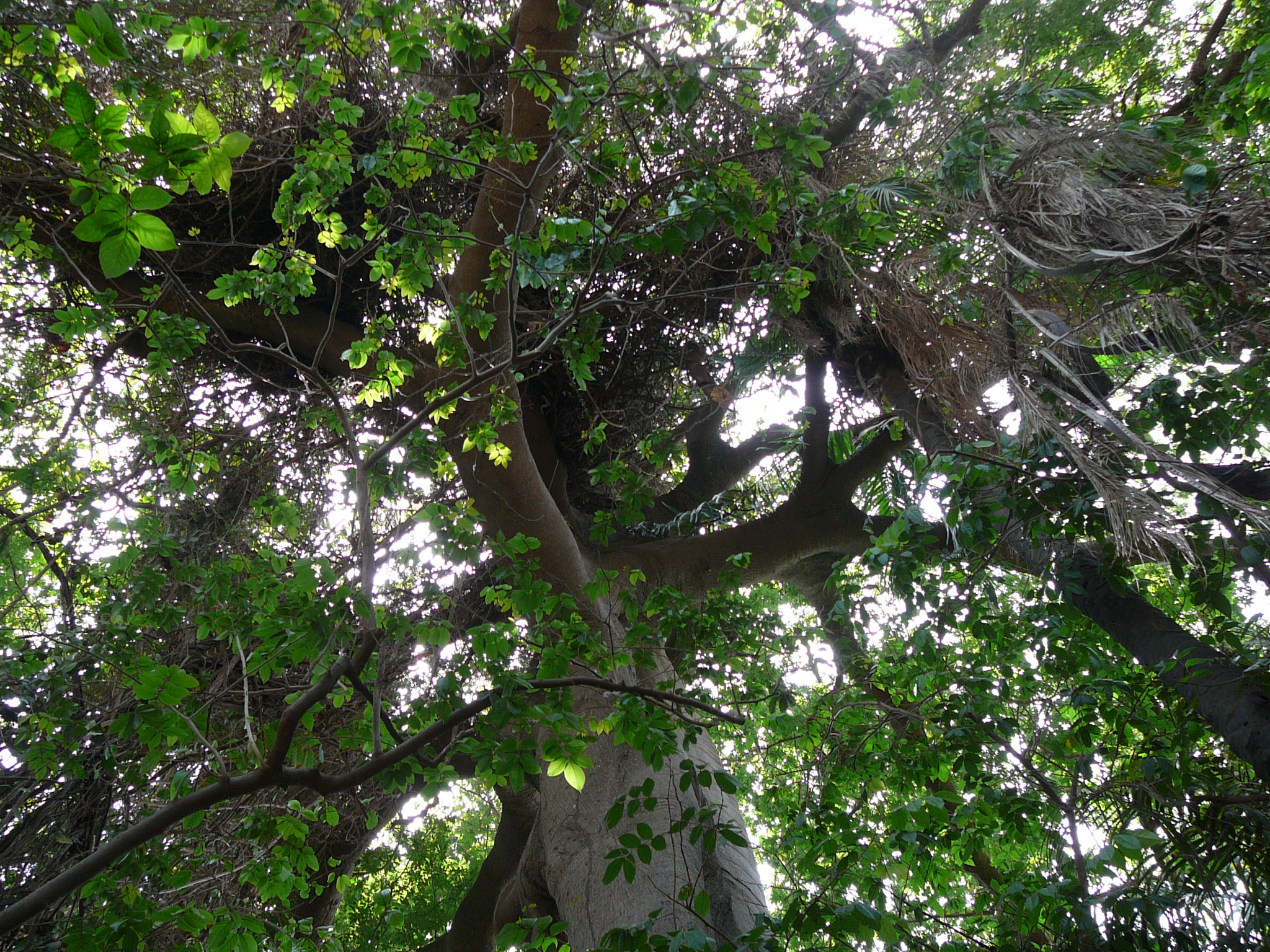
Bombax costatum

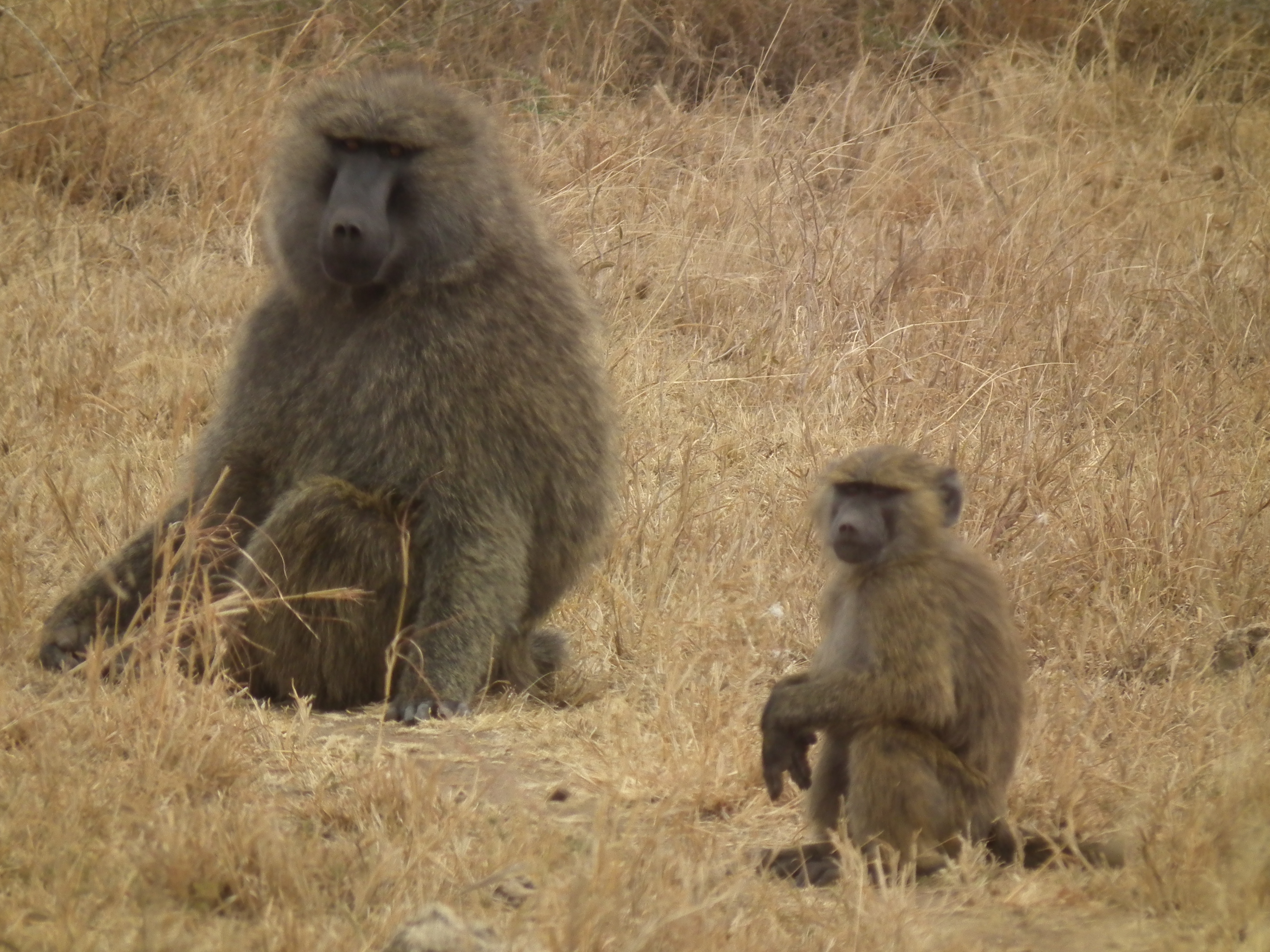
Olive baboons

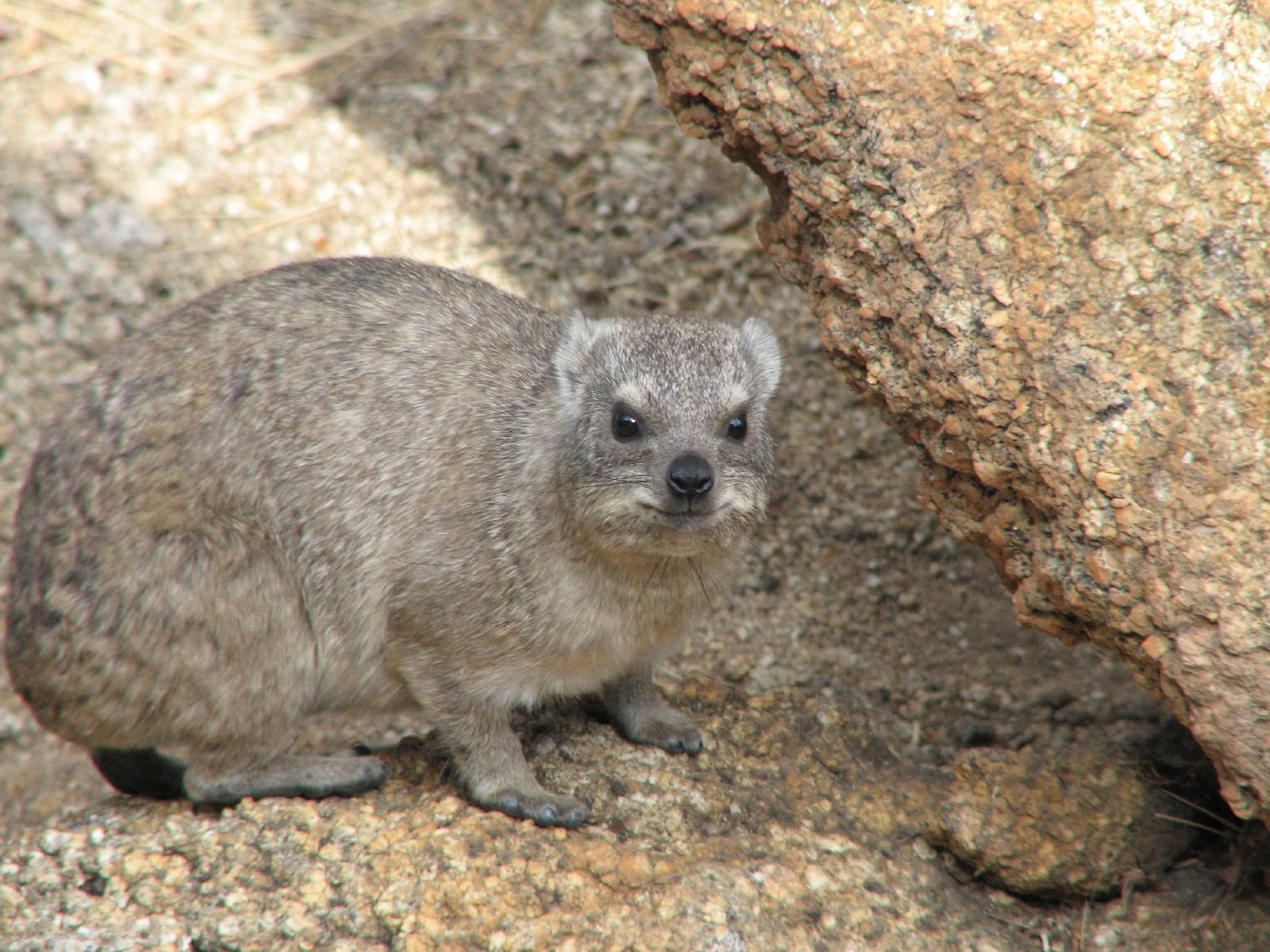
Rock hyrax

== Archaeology ==
Mount Hombori is a significant archaeological site, with caves inhabited more than 2,000 years ago.

== See also ==
- Dogon people
- Toloy
- Tellem
- Dogon religion
