= Sominé Dolo =

Malian physician

Sominé Dolo (1922 – March 15, 1972) was a Malian doctor and politician who served as Mali's first minister of health.

== Biography ==
Sominé Dolo was born in 1922 in Sangha, Mali, in the Mopti region's Bandiagara Cercle. From 1939 to 1942, he attended the École normale supérieure William Ponty, followed by the École nationale de médecine et pharmacie in Dakar, Senegal. He obtained his doctorate from the University of Paris Faculty of Medicine in 1956.

After returning to Africa, he ran in the 1957 French Sudan Territorial Assembly election and won a seat as a territorial councillor to represent Bandiagara. His list, the Union of the Populations of Bandiagara, joined with the Sudanese Union – African Democratic Rally to form the majority after the election. They formed the first Governing Council of French Sudan, with Dolo appointed as minister of health. In subsequent government formations during the region's transition from European rule, he was repeatedly reelected to represent Bandiagara and retained as health minister.

Then, after Mali gained independence, he was re-appointed by President Modibo Keïta as minister of health and social affairs, becoming the newly independent country's first health minister. He would hold the position for eight years. In this period, he also served as president of Mali's Red Cross.

In 1968, he was involved in the founding of the country's National School of Medicine and Pharmacy. Shortly after, he was traveling abroad in Senegal during the 1968 Malian coup d'état, after which Moussa Traoré replaced him as minister of health with Bénétieni Fofana. However, he was not himself targeted by the coup leaders, and he became the regional director of health for Bamako.

Dolo died in Bamako in 1972. A hospital in the town of Mopti bears his name.
