= Koro, Mali =

Koro
- Commune and town
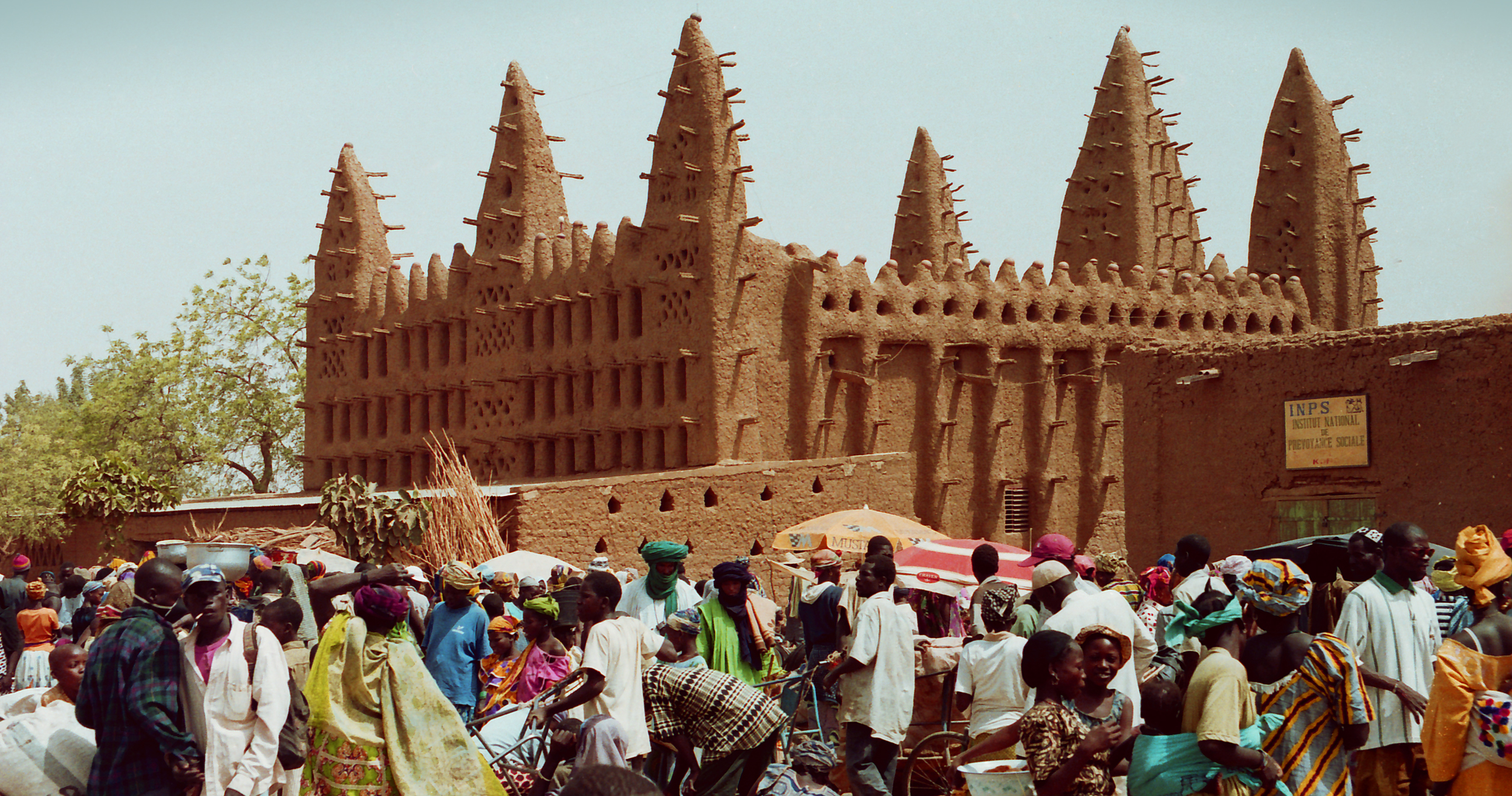

- Location in Mali
- Coordinates: 14°04′06″N 3°04′53″W
- Country: Mali
- Region: Bandiagara Region
- Cercle: Koro Cercle

Population (2009)
  - Total: 62,681
- Time zone: UTC+0 (GMT)

Koro (Kɔ́rɔ́) is a town and commune and seat of the Cercle of Koro in the Bandiagara Region of Mali. At the 2009 Census, the commune had a population of 62,681.

Jamsay Dogon is spoken in Koro. Other than Dogon people, there are also some Burkinabé living in Koro. There is a weekly Saturday market.

Agriculture is the source of income in Koro.

Fulani herdsmen and Dogon farmers signed three humanitarian agreements on 12, 22, and 24 January 2021 to end fighting in Koro.

== See also ==
- List of cities in Mali
