= Andiagana-Na =

- Village
- Location in Mali
- Coordinates: 13°56′3″N 2°59′50″W
- Country: Mali
- Region: Mopti Region
- Cercle: Koro Cercle
- Commune: Dougoutene II
- Time zone: UTC+0 (GMT)

Andiagana-Na is a village and seat of the commune of Dougoutene II in the Cercle of Koro in the Mopti Region of southern-central Mali.
