= Toroli =

- Village
- Location in Mali
- Coordinates: 13°55′22″N 3°13′15″W
- Country: Mali
- Region: Mopti Region
- Cercle: Koro Cercle
- Commune: Dougoutene I
- Time zone: UTC+0 (GMT)

Toroli (Tóról) is a village and seat of the commune of Dougoutene I in the Cercle of Koro in the Mopti Region of southern-central Mali. Togo kan is spoken in Toroli. There is a weekly Monday regional market in Toroli.
