= Sangha, Mali =

Sangha
- Commune
- Location in Mali
- Coordinates: 14°27′54″N 3°18′22″W
- Country: Mali
- Region: Mopti Region
- Cercle: Bandiagara Cercle

Population (2009 census)
  - Total: 32,513
- Time zone: UTC+0 (GMT)

Sangha (sometimes spelled Sanga) is a rural commune in the Cercle of Bandigara in the Mopti Region of Mali. The commune contains around 44 small villages and in the 2009 census had a population of 32,513. The administrative centre (chef-lieu) is the village of Sangha Ogol Leye, one of a cluster of at least 10 small villages at the top of the Bandiagara Escarpment.

The commune is known as a centre for Dogon traditional religion with many temples and shrines, and as a base for visitors to the local Dogon villages. Toro So is spoken in the village of Sangha. Most of the ethnographic work by Marcel Griaule was carried out among the Dogon of Sangha.

== Gallery ==
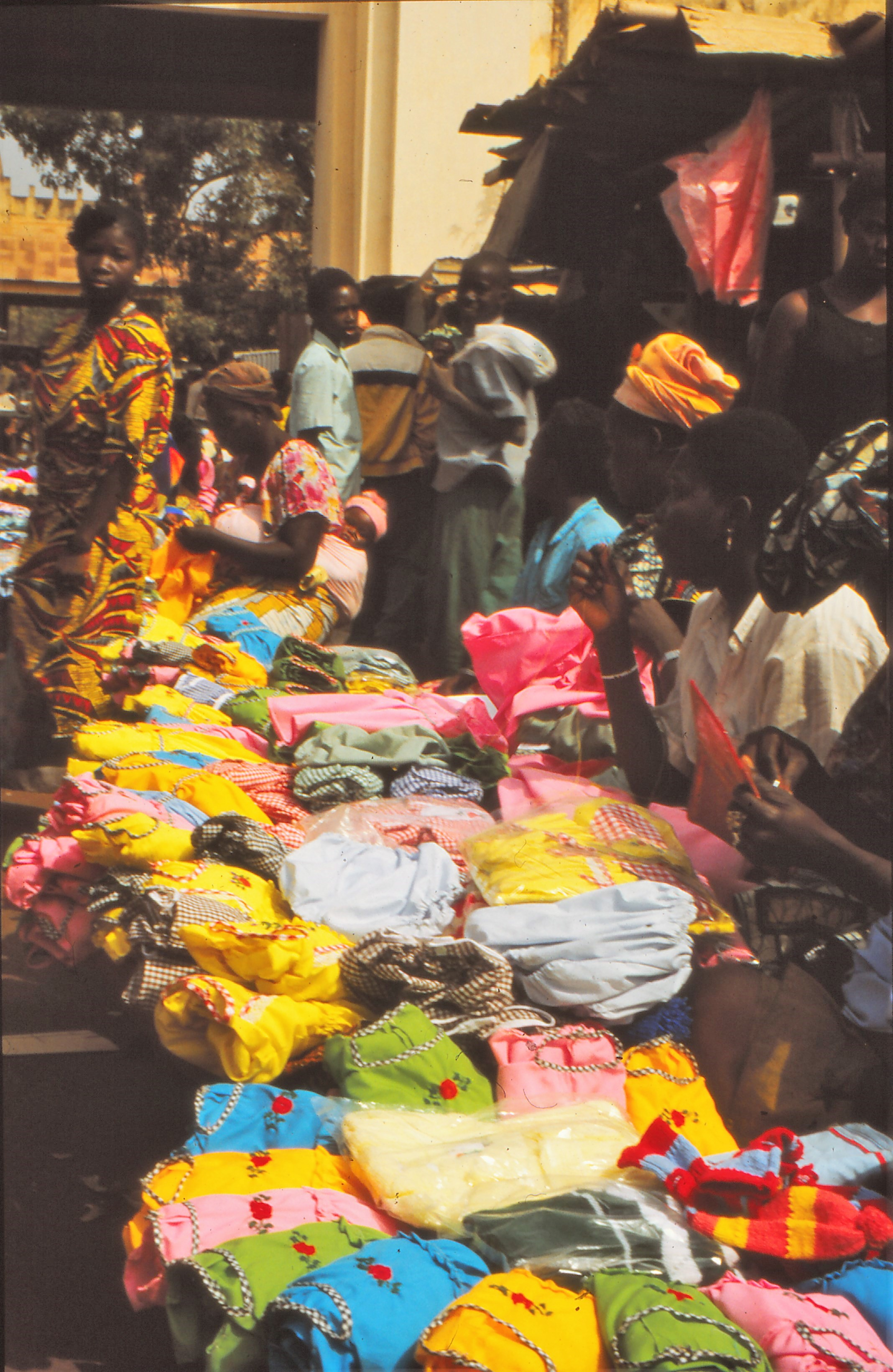
Multicoloured clothing at Sangha market, 1992

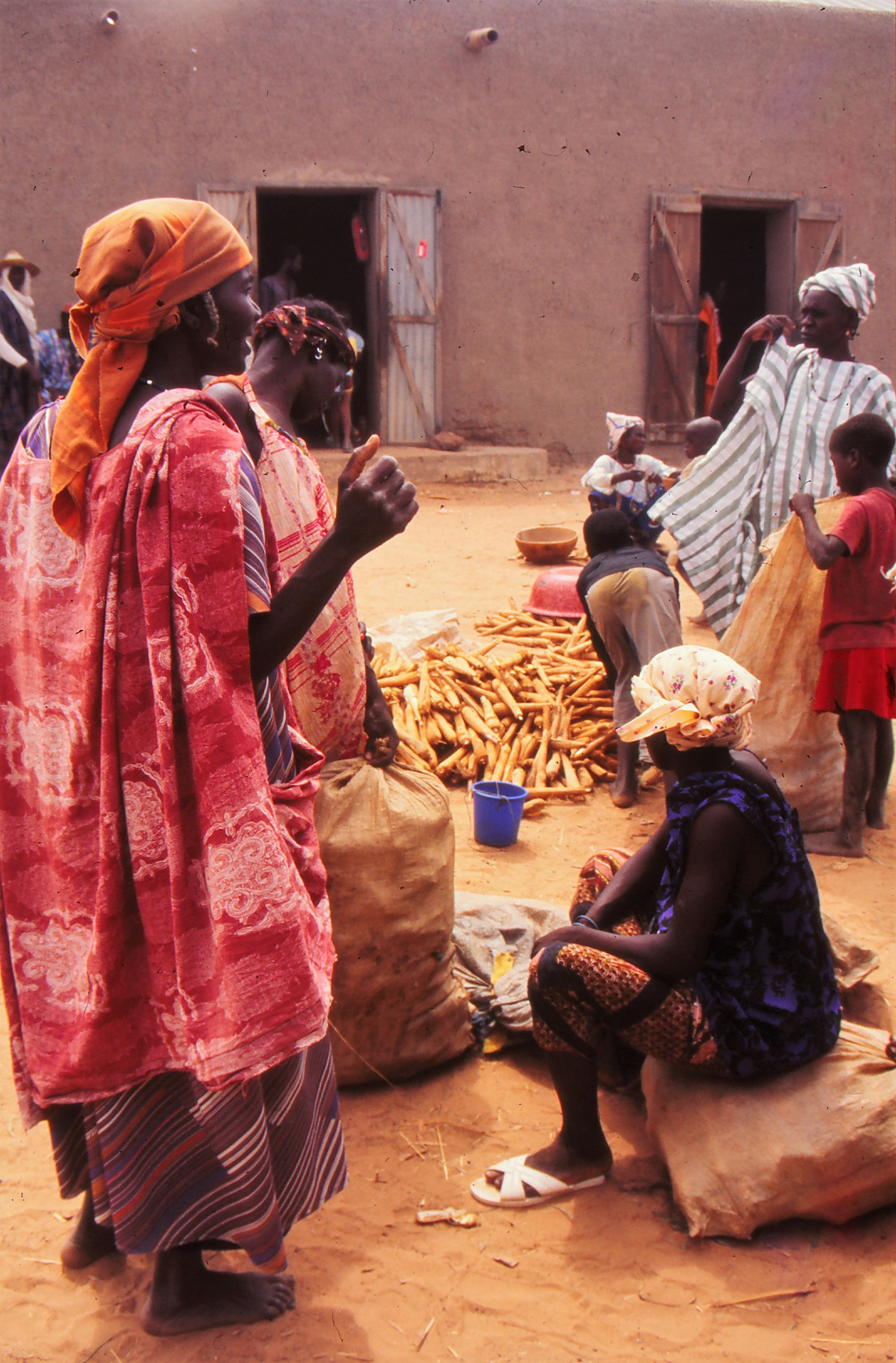
Women with children and cassava roots at Sangha market, 1992

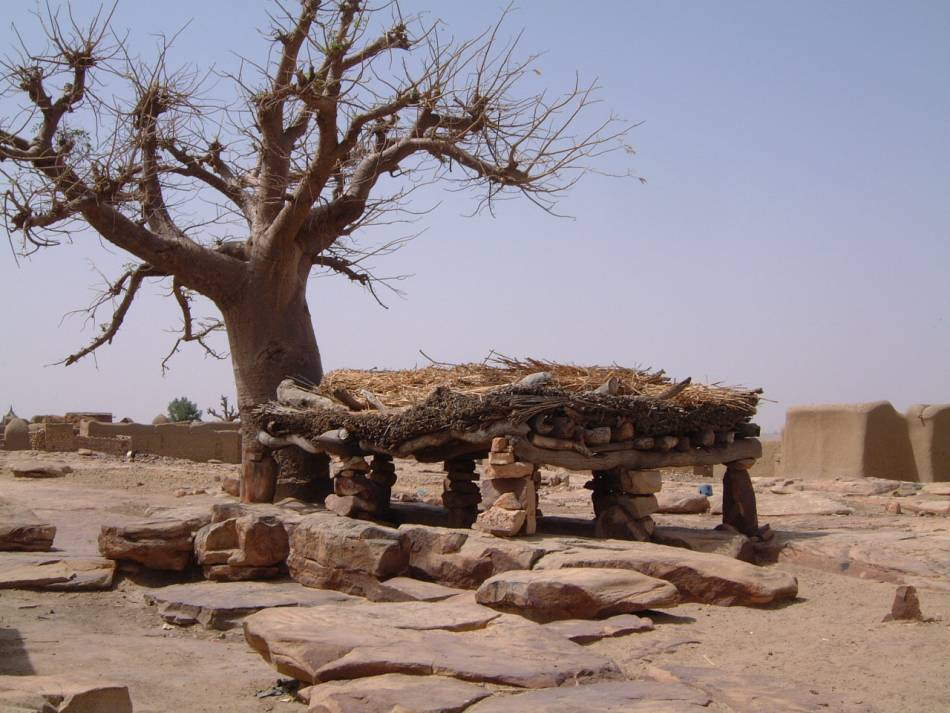
A toguna at Sangha, 2006

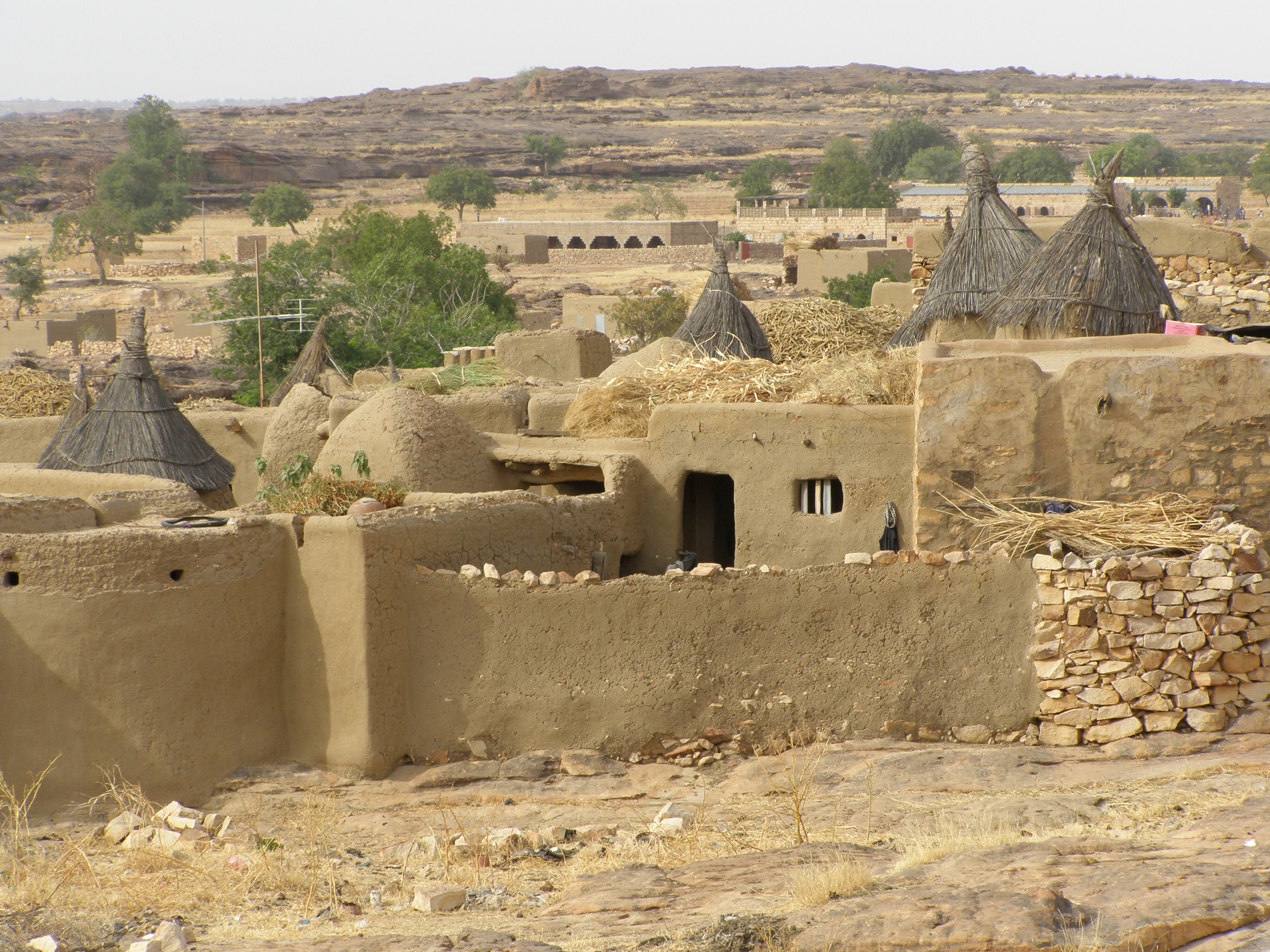
View of Sangha, 2007

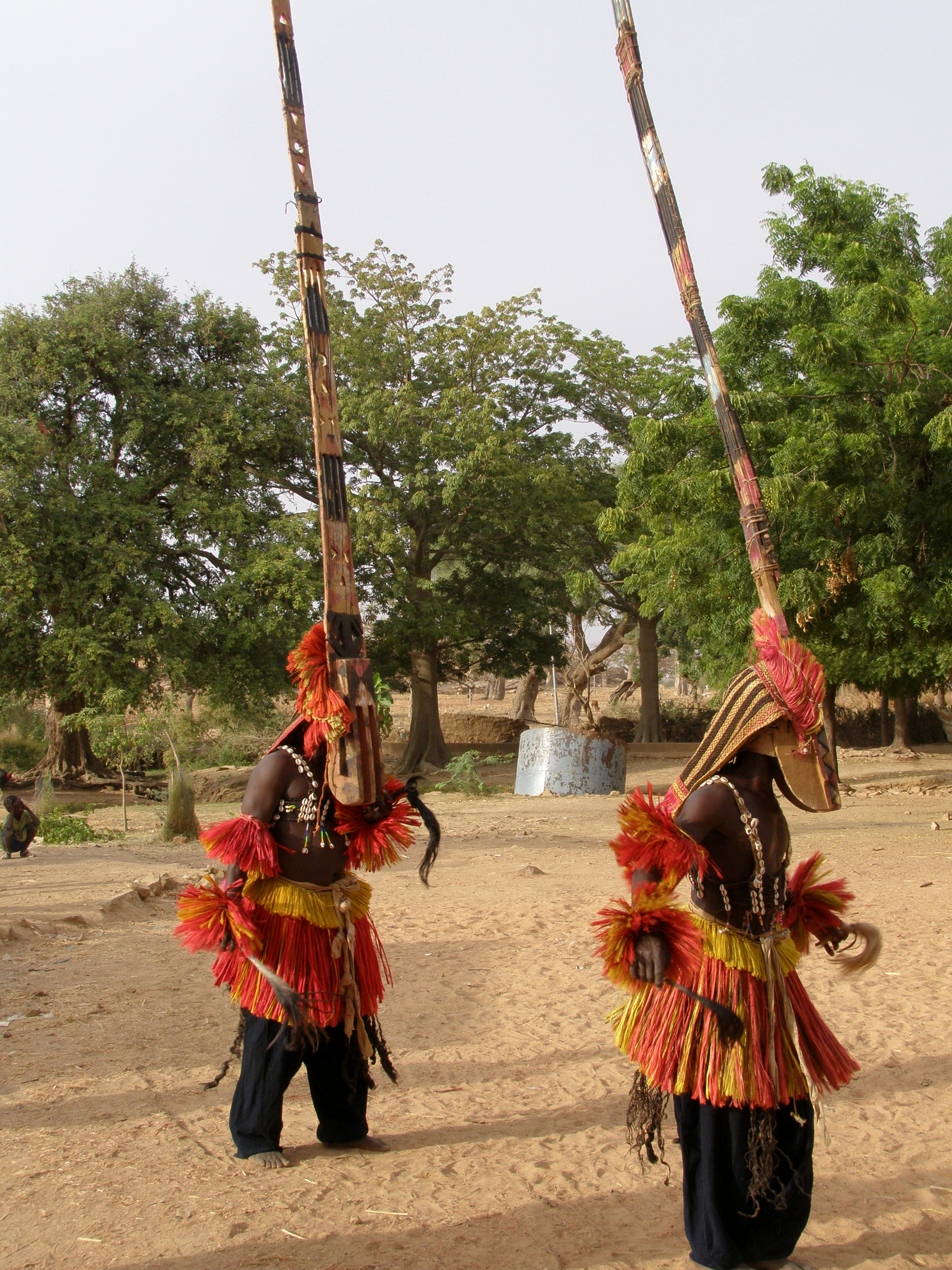
Multistoried masks during a dance in Sangha, 2007

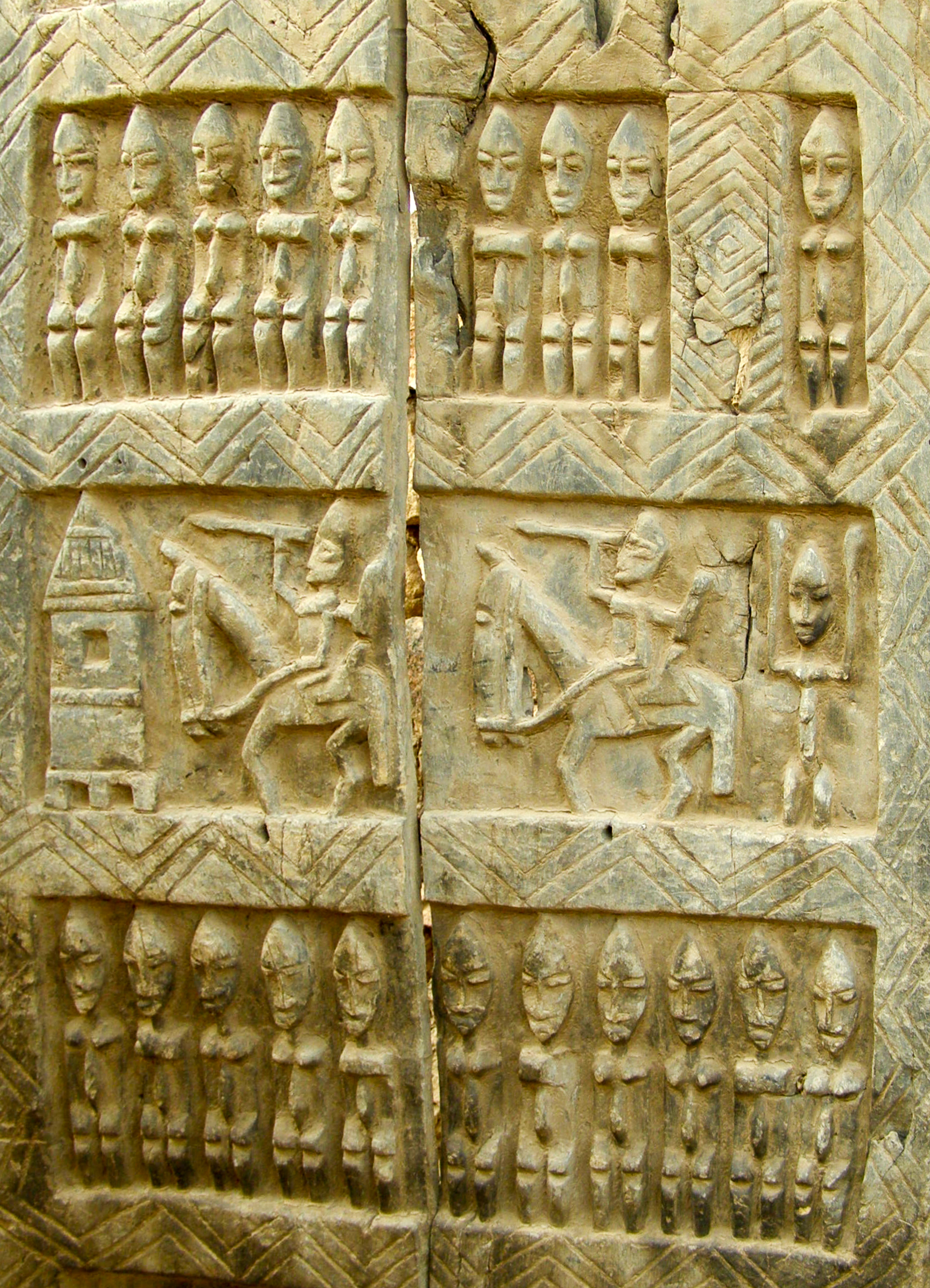
Door of the house of the Hogon in Sangha, Ogol quarter, 2007

== Notable people ==
- Sominé Dolo, first health minister of Mali

== See also ==
- Binou
- Lebe
- Tellem
- Toloy
- Yaboyabo
- Awa Society
