= Koporo Pen =

Coordinates: 14°08′12″N 3°11′19″W

- Commune and village
- Interactive map of Koporo Pen
- Country: Mali
- Region: Mopti Region
- Cercle: Koro Cercle

Population (1998)
  - Total: 14,829
- Time zone: UTC+0 (GMT)

Koporo Pen (local name: Kɔ̀ⁿ-pɛ̌ⁿ, lit. "old Kon") is a village and commune and seat of the Cercle of Koro in the Mopti Region of Mali. In 1998 the commune had a population of 14,829.

Koporo Pen is a village located in the plains. The village has Catholic and Protestant churches. The main economic activities are pottery making, farming, and herding. The village hosts a weekly Monday market. The local language is Togo kan.
