= Dougoutene I =

- Commune
- Location in Mali
- Coordinates: 13°55′22″N 3°13′15″W
- Country: Mali
- Region: Mopti Region
- Cercle: Koro Cercle

Area
  - Total: 447 km^{2} (173 sq mi)

Population (2009 census)
  - Total: 21,753
  - Density: 48.7/km^{2} (126/sq mi)
- Time zone: UTC+0 (GMT)

Dougoutene I is a commune of the Cercle of Koro in the Mopti Region of Mali. The commune contains 20 villages and in the 2009 census had a population of 21,753. The commune is administered from the village of Toroli.

Some typical cultivated plants are millet, sesame and rice.
