= Diallassagou =

Coordinates: 13°44′N 3°38′W

- Commune and town
- Interactive map of Diallassagou
- Country: Mali
- Region: Bandiagara Region
- Cercle: Diallassagou Cercle

Population (1998)
  - Total: 18,799
- Time zone: UTC+0 (GMT)

Diallassagou (Jà:-sɔ̀gû:) is a town and commune in the Cercle of Diallassagou in the Bandiagara Region of Mali. In 1998 the commune had a population of 18,799.

Tomo kan and also some Marka (Dafin) are spoken in the town of Diallassagou.
