= Dougoutene II =

- Commune
- Location in Mali
- Coordinates: 13°56′3″N 2°59′50″W
- Country: Mali
- Region: Mopti Region
- Cercle: Koro Cercle

Area
  - Total: 265 km^{2} (102 sq mi)

Population (2009 census)
  - Total: 20,115
  - Density: 75.9/km^{2} (197/sq mi)
- Time zone: UTC+0 (GMT)

Dougoutene II is a rural commune of the Cercle of Koro in the Mopti Region of Mali. The commune contains 20 villages and in the 2009 census had a population of 20,115. The commune is administered from Andiagana-Na.
