= Youdiou =

Coordinates: 14°17′N 3°10′W

- Commune and village
- Interactive map of Youdiou
- Country: Mali
- Region: Mopti Region
- Cercle: Koro Cercle

Population (1998)
  - Total: 14,737
- Time zone: UTC+0 (GMT)

Youdiou (Yú:jú) is a village and commune and seat of the Cercle of Koro in the Mopti Region of Mali. In 1998 the commune had a population of 15,737.

Jamsay Dogon is spoken in the village. Local surnames are Poudiougo, Douyon, and Saye. There is a weekly Thursday market in the village. Youdiou also has a Protestant church.

Some typical cultivated plants are millet, sorghum, corn, rice and sesame.
