= Dinangourou =

- Commune and village
- Location in Mali
- Coordinates: 14°27′7″N 2°14′31″W
- Country: Mali
- Region: Bandiagara Region
- Cercle: Koro Cercle

Population (2009 census)
  - Total: 35,886
- Time zone: UTC+0 (GMT)

Dinangourou (Dúŋà ɔ̀rù; Dinaŋguru) is a village and commune of the Cercle of Koro in the Bandiagara Region of Mali. Jamsay Dogon is spoken in the village. A weekly Sunday market is hosted in the village. The local surname is Goro.

On December 20, 2023, jihadists from Jama'at Nasr al-Islam wal Muslimin (JNIM) attacked Malian forces at Dinangourou. JNIM first exploded an SVBIED and then raided the Malian camp. Several dozen Malian soldiers were killed, although the exact death toll is unknown.
