= Bamba, Bandiagara =

Bamba
- Commune
- Location in Mali
- Coordinates: 14°38′38″N 3°5′54″W
- Country: Mali
- Region: Bandiagara Region
- Cercle: Koro Cercle

Population (2009 census)
  - Total: 13,610
- Time zone: UTC+0 (GMT)

Bamba is a rural commune of the Cercle of Koro in the Bandiagara Region of Mali. The commune contains 14 villages and in the 2009 census had a population of 13,610. Most of the population of the commune are Dogon. The administrative centre (chef-lieu) is the village of Déguéré.

== See also ==
- Déguéré
