= Kassa, Mali =

Coordinates: 14°43′29″N 3°03′59″W

Kassa
- Commune
- Interactive map of Kassa
- Country: Mali
- Region: Mopti Region
- Cercle: Koro Cercle

Population (1998)
  - Total: 11,218
- Time zone: UTC+0 (GMT)

Kassa (Ká:dà) is a commune of the Cercle of Koro in the Mopti Region of Mali. Tommo So is spoken in Kassa. Kassa consists of a cluster of about 17 villages, mostly situated on the top of a plateau. The principal village lies at Berdosso. In 1998 the commune had a population of 11,218.

The local surname is Tolo.

Civil strife and conflict have pitted the local Dozo, who practise animism in the land of the Dogon, against the Islamic fundamentalists made-up mostly of Fulani people who demand of the Dozo to pay the Islamic poll-tax. Disputes have also erupted over grazing rights for cattle.
