= Tellem =

Ethnic group in Mali

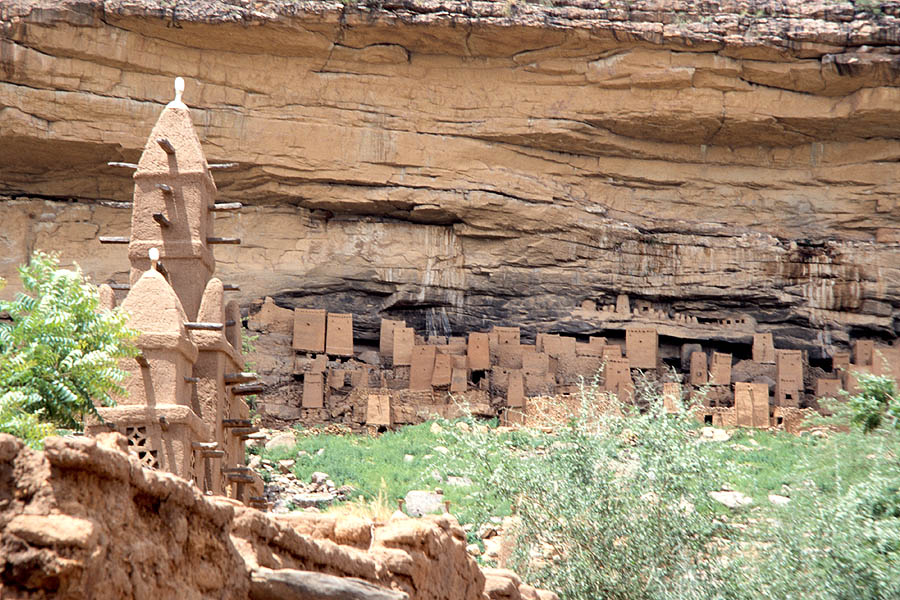
The former dwellings of the Tellem people by the Bandiagara Escarpment

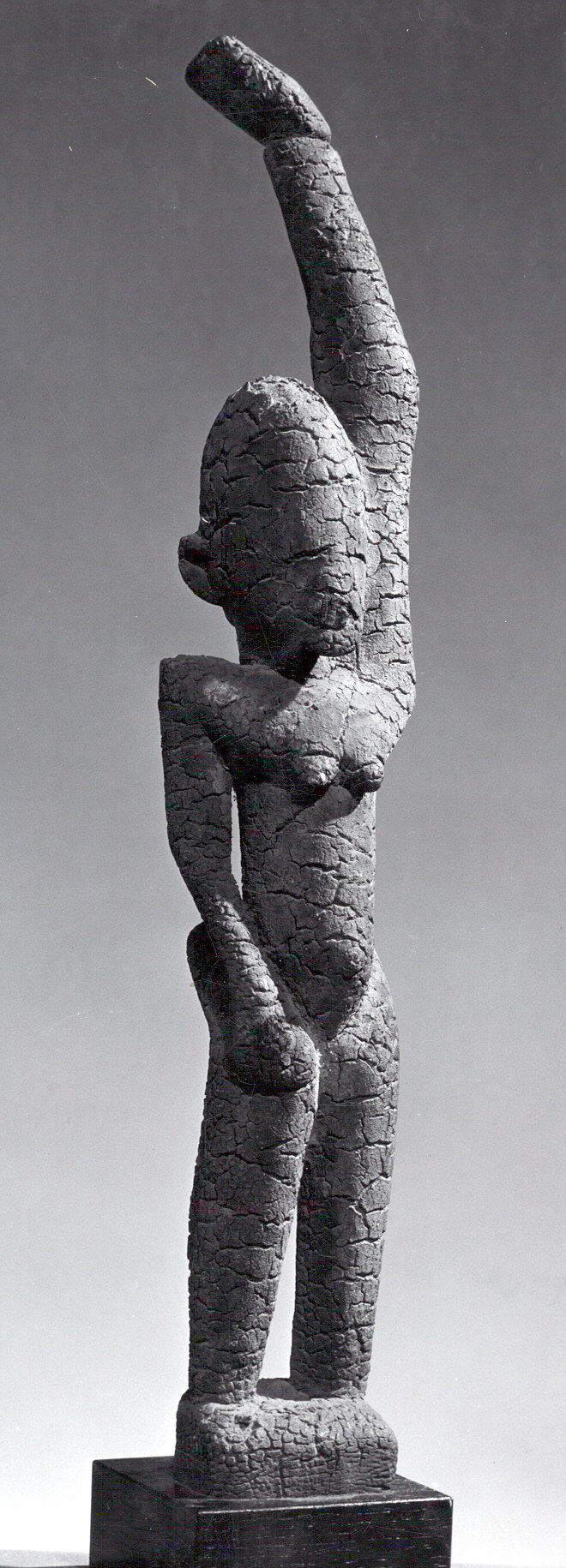
Black and white picture of a female figure with raised arm; 15th–17th century; wood (ficus, moraceae), sacrificial materials; height: 44.8 cm (17 5/8 in.); Metropolitan Museum of Art (New York City)

The Tellem (meaning: "those who were before us" or "We found them" in the Dogon language) were the people who inhabited the Bandiagara Escarpment in Mali between the 11th and 16th centuries CE. The Dogon people migrated to the escarpment region around the 14th century. In the rock cells of this red cliff, clay constructions shelter the bones of the Tellem as well as vestiges witnessing to their civilization, which existed well before that of the Dogons.

== Etymology ==
The Dogon use the name "Tellem" (= Temmem) to describe the people who lived on the cliff before them. The literal meaning of this word is: "We found them". The name has a much broader meaning among the Dogon, both in place and in time, than "Tellem" in the sense of "Tellem culture".

== History and culture ==
The arrival of the Tellem in Bandiagara—where they would have succeeded the Toloy—is believed to date back to the 11th century. Archaeological excavations have unearthed numerous bones and objects such as fabrics, baskets, pearls, and pots.

They built their houses on the sides of cliffs. Small or short in stature, they are sometimes wrongly labelled as pygmies. They lived by fishing, wildcrafting, hoe-farming, animal husbandry and bow hunting.

In the necropolis, they placed their offerings alongside their deceased. Their dead were sometimes buried in their clothes or wrapped in a blanket. The women wore a braid of braided fibers. Their dead were accompanied by grave-goods—different for male and female. The skeletons lying scattered, the remains were gradually moved to make room for new burials. In order to establish the biological identity of the Tellem population, these skeletons were examined. They all belong to a single group, with recognizable anthropometric characters, whose genetic composition has not changed much during the five centuries of its existence.

In the 11th century, the Dogon coming from Mandé country and fleeing Islamization and persecution just like the Serer, arrived in the cliffs. The Tellem fled in turn, taking refuge towards the south in Mali and Burkina Faso. Some Tellem villages still exist around the Malian border with Burkina Faso, including the village of Yoro in Mali.

The Tellem built dwellings around the base of the escarpment as well as directly into the cliff-face. Many of these structures are still visible in the area. Some Tellem buildings, most notably the granaries, are still in use by the Dogon, although generally Dogon villages are located at the bottom or top of the escarpment, where water gathers and farming is possible.

The old Tellem houses, high up along the cliff, will serve as a cemetery for the Dogons who hoist the bodies of their dead with ropes.

Female Figure, Tellem, Mali, 11th-19th century. Art Institute of Chicago.

The Tellem people disappeared for unknown reasons, or perhaps interbred with the Dogon. Others believe that they might have interbred with the Kouroumba or Kurumba ( fr ) of Burkina Faso when they headed south following the Dogon's arrival, but sources do not agree. In local legends, it is thought by some in Mali today that the Tellem possessed extraordinary magical powers.

== See also ==
- Persecution of traditional African religion
- Religious persecution § Persecution of Dogons
- Religious persecution § Persecution of Serers
- Mossi people
- Bambara people
- Kaarta
- Serer ancient history
- Serer history
- Sangha, Mali

== Bibliography ==
- Rogier Michiel Alphons Bedaux, «Tellem and Dogon material culture», in African arts (Los Angeles), 21 (4), août 1988, p. 38-45, 91.
- Laure Meyer, «With raised arms, the Tellem-Dogon prayed for rain», in African forms: art and rituals, Assouline, New York, 2001, p. 39.
- Rogier Michiel Alphons Bedaux, «Tellem, reconnaissance archéologique d'une culture de l'Ouest africain au Moyen Âge : les appuie-nuque», in Journal de la Société des africanistes, 44 (1), 1974, p. 7-42: en libre accès sur le portail Persée .
- (in French) Rogier Michiel Alphons Bedaux et Rita Bolland, «Tellem, reconnaissance archéologique d'une culture de l'Ouest africain au Moyen Âge: les textiles», in Journal des Africanistes, 50 (1), 1980, p. 9-23: en libre accès sur Persée .
- (in French) Rogier Michiel Alphons Bedaux et A. G. Lange, «Tellem, reconnaissance archéologique d'une culture de l'Ouest africain au Moyen Âge : la poterie», in Journal des Africanistes, 53 (1-2), 1983, p. 5-59 : en libre accès sur Persée .
- (in French) Rogier Michiel Alphons Bedaux et Rita Bolland, «Vêtements médiévaux du Mali: les cache-sexe de fibre des Tellem», in Beate Engelbrecht et Bernhard Gardi (dir.), Man does not go naked: Textilien und Handwerk aus afrikanischen und anderen Ländern, Ethnologisches Seminar der Universität und Museum für Völkerkunde, Bâle, 1989, p. 15-34.
- (in French) Rogier Michiel Alphons Bedaux, «Des Tellem aux Dogon: recherches archéologiques dans la boucle du Niger (Mali)», in Gigi Pezzoli (dir.), Dall'archeologia all'arte tradizionale africana = De l'archéologie à l'art traditionnel africain = From archaeology to traditional African art, Centro Studi Archeologia Africana, Milan, 1992, p. 83-101.
- (in French) Rogier Michiel Alphons Bedaux, « Les textiles Tellem », in Musée national du Mali. Textiles du Mali, Musée national du Mali, Bamako, 2003, p. 23-29.
- (in French) Bernard de Grunne, « La sculpture classique Tellem : essai d'analyse stylistique », in Arts d'Afrique noire (Arnouville), n°;88, hiver 1993, p. 19-30.
- (in French) Bernhard Gardi, « Les traditions avant 1500: Tellem, Mali », in Boubou - c'est chic : les boubous du Mali et d'autres pays de l'Afrique de l'Ouest, Éditions Christoph Merian, Museum der Kulturen Basel, Bâle, 2000, p. 42-45; 185.
- Tarlow, Sarah; Stutz, Liv Nilsson; The Oxford Handbook of the Archaeology of Death and Burial (Oxford Handbooks in Archaeology), OUP Oxford (2013), p. 214, ISBN 9780199569069 (retrieved March 15, 2020)
