= Dioungani =

- Commune and village
- Location in Mali
- Coordinates: 14°18′47″N 2°44′22″W
- Country: Mali
- Region: Mopti Region
- Cercle: Koro Cercle

Population (2009 census)
  - Total: 32,418
- Time zone: UTC+0 (GMT)

Dioungani is a village and commune of the Cercle of Koro in the Mopti Region of Mali. Jamsay Dogon is spoken in the commune.
