= Yoro, Mali =

Coordinates: 14°17′N 2°08′W

Yoro
- Commune and village
- Interactive map of Yoro
- Country: Mali
- Region: Mopti Region
- Cercle: Koro Cercle

Population (1998)
  - Total: 10,535
- Time zone: UTC+0 (GMT)

Yoro is a village and commune and seat of the Cercle of Koro in the Mopti Region of Mali. In 1998 the commune had a population of 10,535. The village and Gangafani were attacked by suspected Fulani gunmen, who killed 41 people according to a MINUSMA count.
