= Madougou =

Coordinates: 14°23′57″N 3°04′44″W

- Commune and village
- Interactive map of Madougou
- Country: Mali
- Region: Mopti Region
- Cercle: Koro Cercle

Population (1998)
  - Total: 24,600
- Time zone: UTC+0 (GMT)

Madougou is a village and commune and seat of the Cercle of Koro in the Mopti Region of Mali. In 1998 the commune had a population of 24,600.
