= Toloy =

A people in Mali

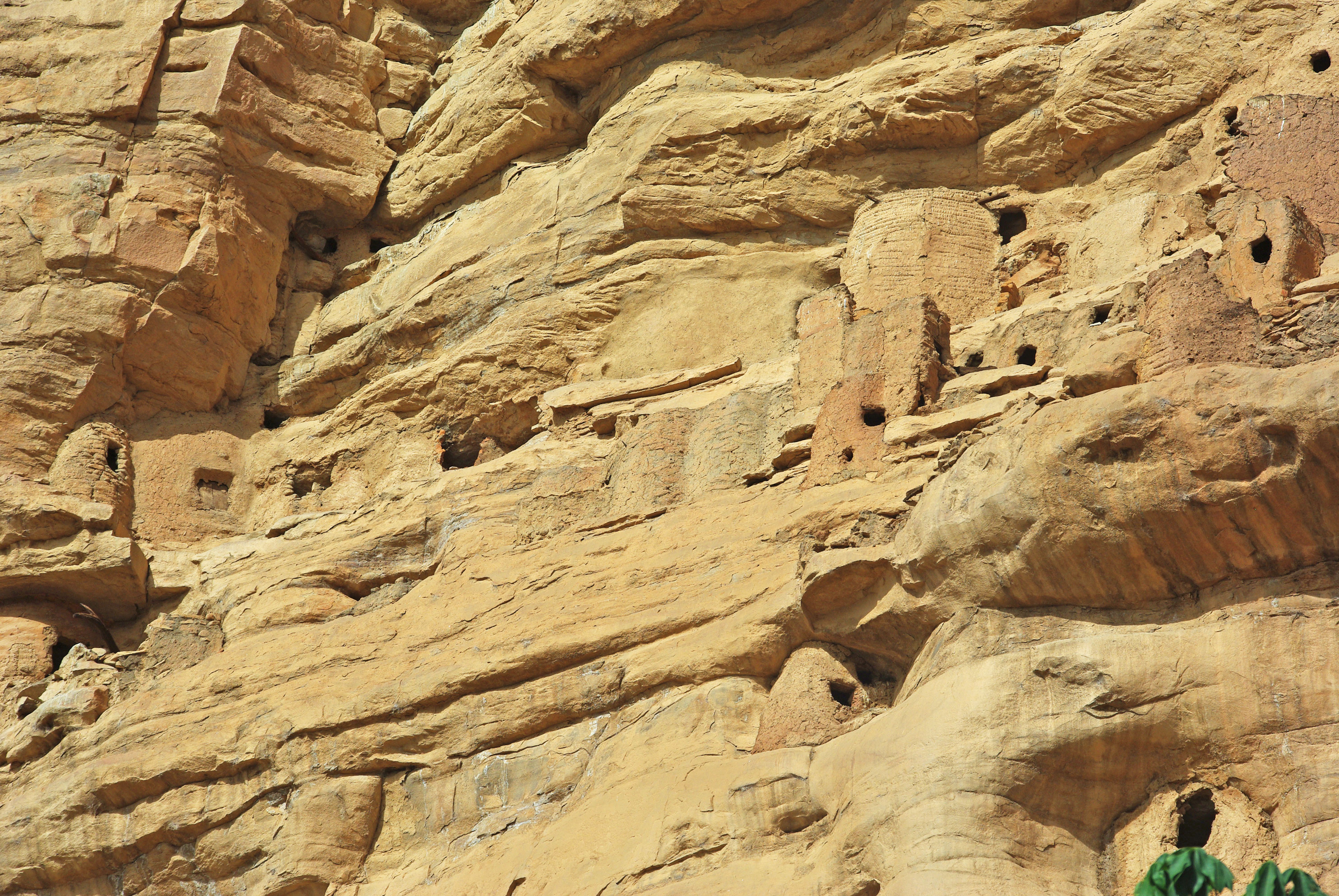
Toloy dwellings, now abandoned, in the Bandiagara Escarpment in Mali.

Toloy is the name given to the first occupants of the Bandiagara Escarpment in Mali. Since the 15th century, this area has been known as Dogon country.

The people were named after the rocky channel located near Sangha, where the remains of this population were found. Evidence of their culture includes granaries, skeletal remains, pottery, and plants.

Carbon-14 dating has established these artifacts as possibly of 3rd and 2nd centuries BC.

The architecture of their granaries is quite specific to the area. They are formed of superimposed clay strands. This contrasts with the mud bricks used by the Tellem people who occupied the Bandiagara cliff from the 11th until the 16th centuries, or the dry stones covered with mud as constructed by the Dogons since the 15th century.

== See also ==
- History of West Africa
- History of Africa
- Bafour
- Mandé peoples
- Serer ancient history
