= Bandiagara =

- Commune and town
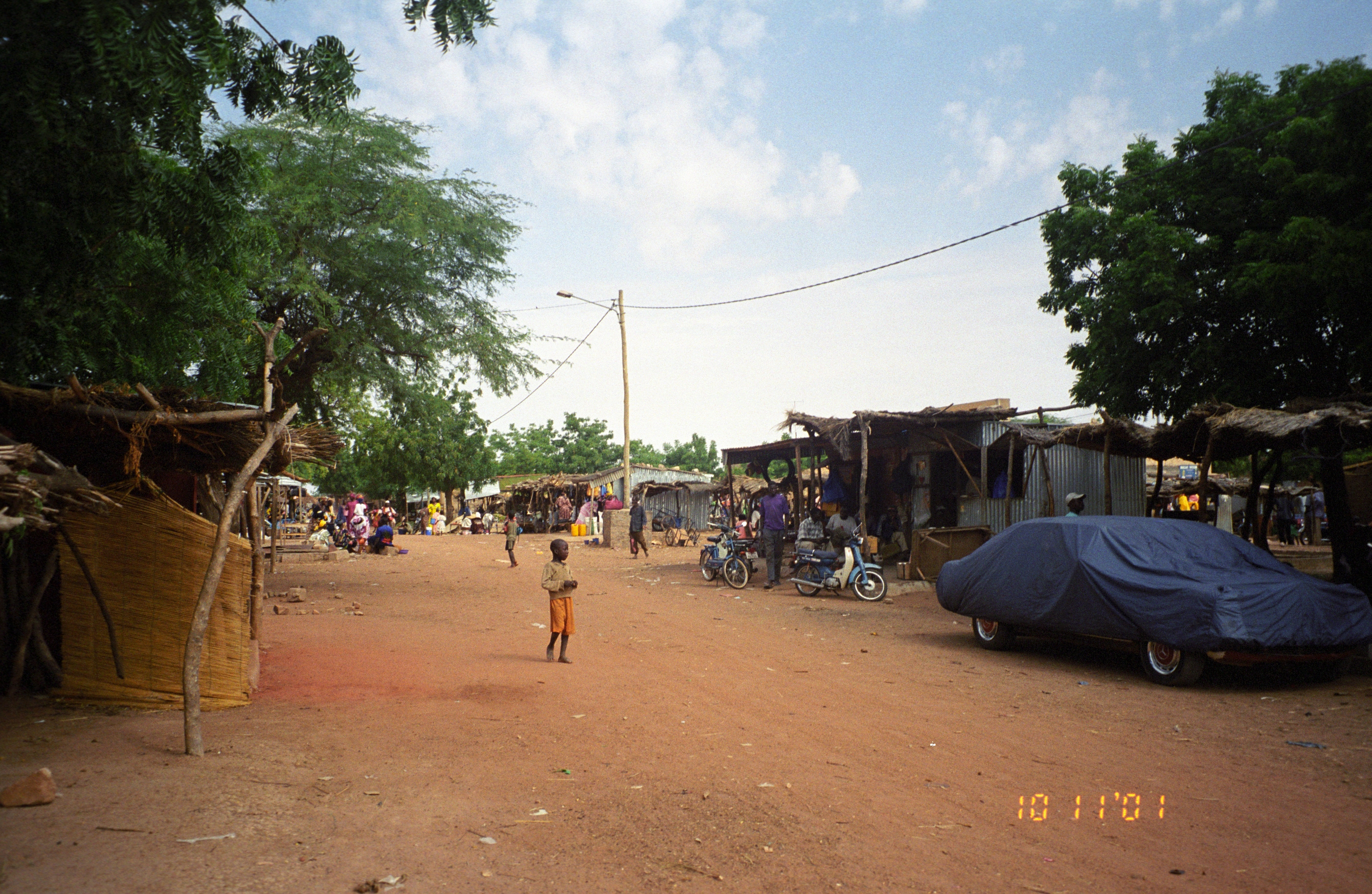

- Location in Mali
- Coordinates: 14°21′0″N 3°36′40″W
- Country: Mali
- Region: Bandiagara Region
- Cercle: Bandiagara Cercle
- Elevation: 392 m (1,286 ft)

Population (2009 census)
  - Total: 25,564
- Time zone: UTC+0 (GMT)

Bandiagara (French pronunciation: [bɑ̃djaɡaʁa]) is a small town and urban commune, the administrative capital of the Bandiagara Region of Mali. The name translates roughly to "large eating bowl"—referring to the communal bowl meals are served in. Mainly on its Bandiagara Escarpment it has about 2,000 speakers of the vibrant Bangime language, an isolate used mainly as an anti-language; it has the highest point of the country.

Bandiagara is 65 km east-southeast of Mopti. A seasonal river, the Yamé, flows in a northeasterly direction through the town. The population includes a number of different ethnic groups including Dogons, Fulani and Bambaras.

== History ==
Bandiagara is said to have been founded in 1770 by Nangabanu Tembély, a Dogon hunter.

In 1864, Tidiani Tall, El Hadj Umar Tall's nephew and successor, chose Bandiagara as capital of the Toucouleur empire.

It is the birthplace of Malian authors Amadou Hampâté Bâ, Madina Ly-Tall and Yambo Ouologuem.

In the music video for the song Reset by Three Trapped Tigers it is shown as the location of an alien rune.

As of 2018 the town remained insecure with attacks on hotels used by UN staff being reported. Nine soldiers were killed and nine wounded in an attack on a police station on February 25, 2021.

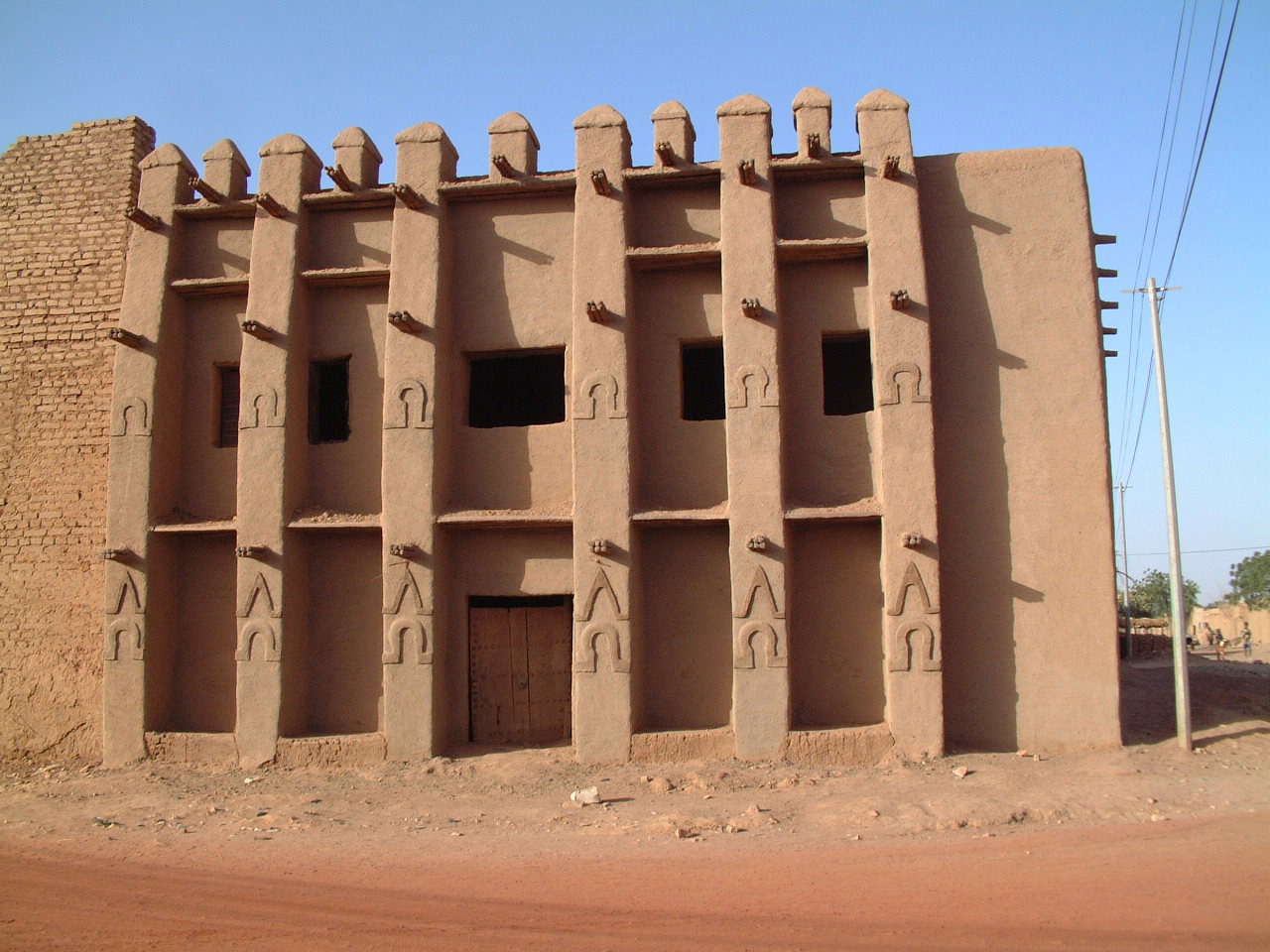
The 19th century Maison toucouleurs in Bandiagara. Part of the Bandiagara Escarpment World Heritage Site in Mali

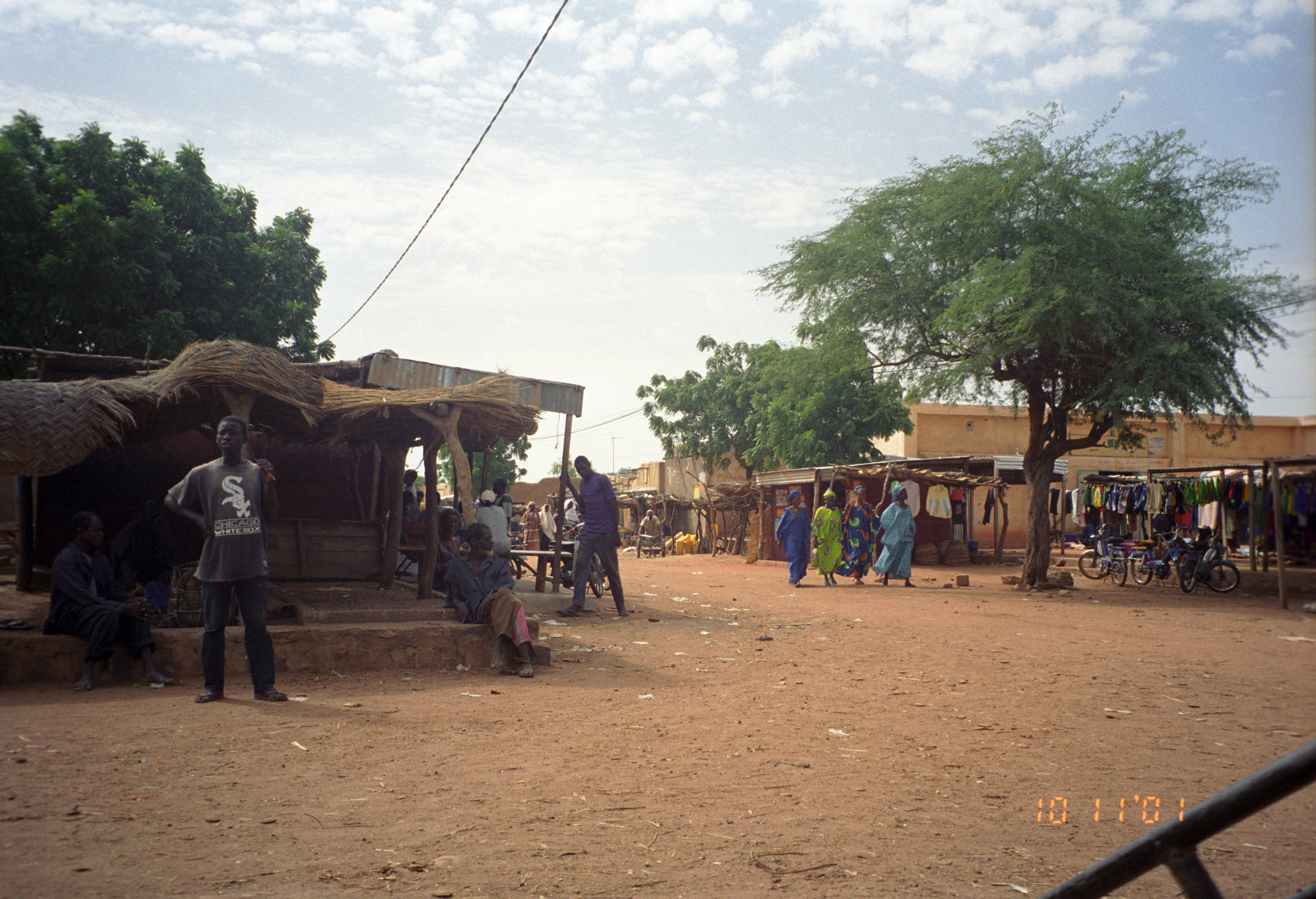
Market stalls in town

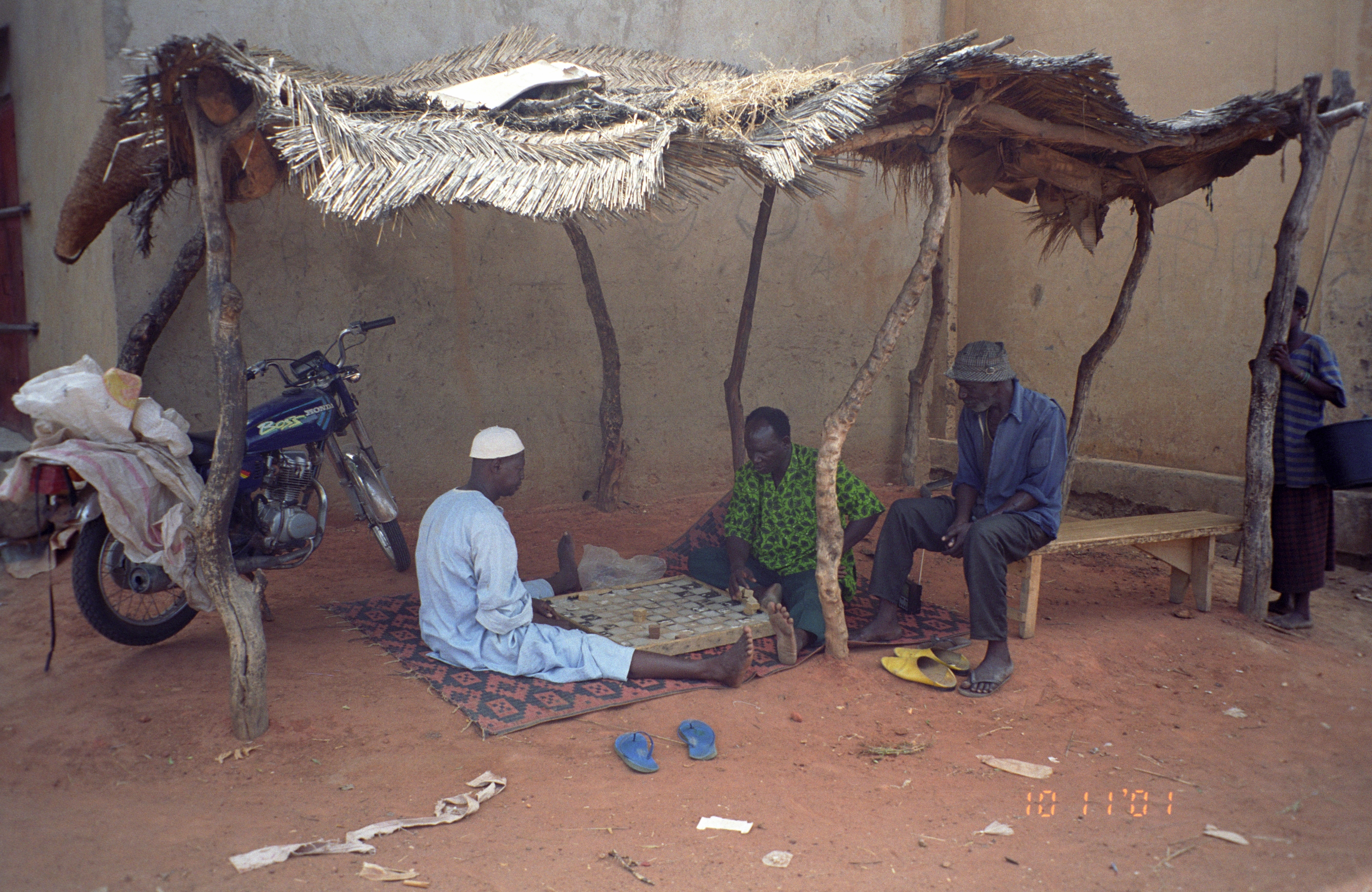
Dogon men

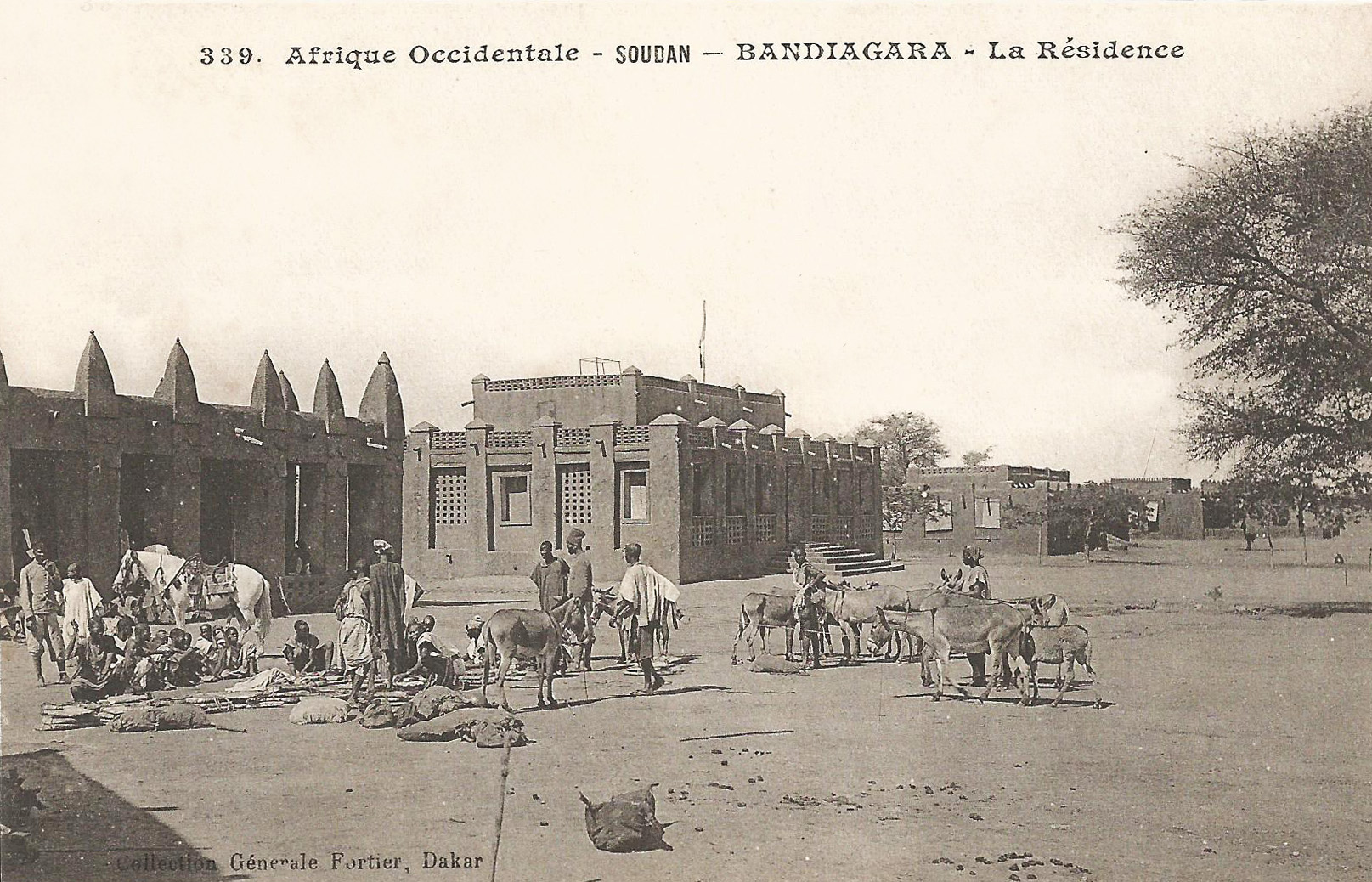
Bandiagara in the early 1900s

== See also ==
- Ounjougou
- Union of the Populations of Bandiagara
