= Bandiagara Escarpment =

Escarpment in Dogon country of Mali

- IUCN category III (natural monument or feature)
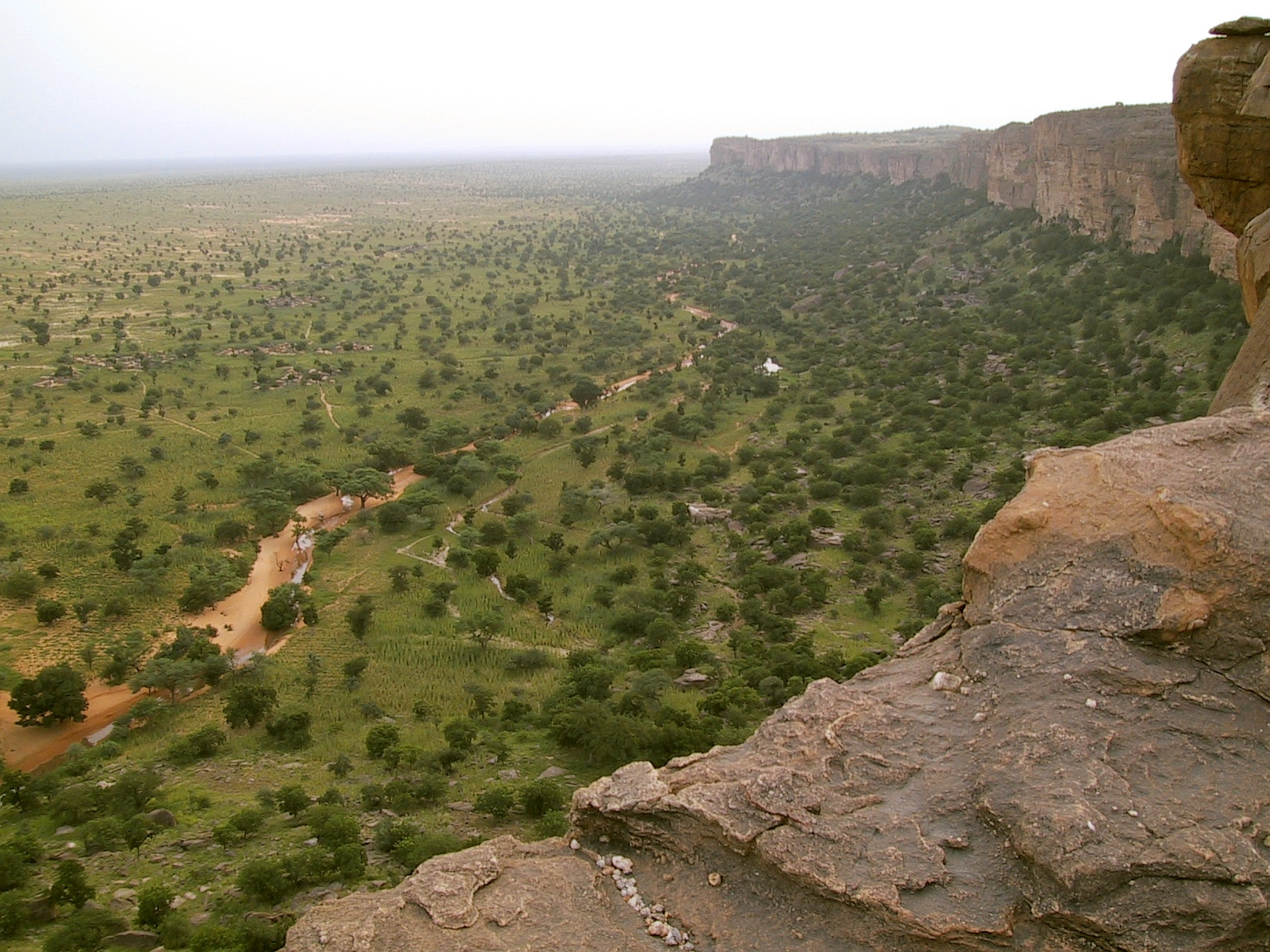
- The Bandiagara Escarpment from Banimoto
- Interactive map of Bandiagara Escarpment
- Location: Mopti Region, Mali
- Established: 1985
- Location within Mali

UNESCO World Heritage Site
- Official name: Falaise de Bandiagara
- Part of: Cliff of Bandiagara (Land of the Dogons)
- Criteria: Cultural and Natural: (v), (vii)
- Reference: 516
- Inscription: 1989 (13th Session)
- Area: 326,950 ha (1,262.4 sq mi)
- Coordinates: 14°20′N 3°25′W

The Bandiagara Escarpment (Arabic: منحدرات باندياغارا الصخرية, French: falaise de Bandiagara) is a sandstone cliff in the Dogon country of Mali. It rises about 500 m (1,600 ft) above the lower sandy flats to the south, and has a length of approximately 150 km (90 mi).

The area of the escarpment is inhabited today by the Dogon people. Before the Dogon, the escarpment was inhabited by the Tellem and Toloy peoples. Many structures remain from the Tellem. The Bandiagara Escarpment was listed in the UNESCO World Heritage List in 1989.

The Cliffs of Bandiagara are a sandstone chain ranging from south to northeast over 200 km (120 mi) and extending to the Grandamia massif. The end of the massif is marked by the Hombori Tondo, Mali's highest peak at 1,155 m (3,789 ft). Because of its archaeological, ethnological and geological characteristics, the entire site is a point of interest.

== History ==
The cave-dwelling Tellem, an ethnic group later pushed out by the arrival of the Dogons, used to live in the slopes of the cliff. The Tellem legacy is evident in the caves they carved into the cliffs so that they could bury their dead high up, far from the frequent flash floods of the area.

Dozens of villages are located along the cliff, such as Kani Bonzon. It was near this village that the Dogons arrived in the 14th century, and from there they spread over the plateau, the escarpment and the plains of the Seno-Gondo.

According to local oral history, the Dogon were relatively undisturbed by French colonial powers due to natural tunnels weaving through the Bandiagara Escarpment. Only the Dogon knew of the tunnels, and were able to use them to ambush and repel aggressors.

== The Bandiagara Escarpment today ==
Today, local guides escort tourist groups along the escarpment to visit Dogon villages. A series of trails runs along the cliffs, and hostels in each village provide food and lodging. The host villages receive income from the hostels and the tourist tax. Large increases in tourism to the area are expected, as a new highway is constructed, putting pressure on local, traditional cultures. In addition, The Independent reports that looting of ancient artifacts is widespread in the area, which is poorly policed.

To call attention to the issue of uncontrolled tourist visitation, the World Monuments Fund included the Bandiagara Escarpment in the 2004 World Monuments Watch. In 2005, WMF provided a grant from American Express to the Mission Culturelle de Bandiagara for the development of a management plan. Beyond the protection of traditional buildings, the management plan calls for the regulation of new construction through the establishment of strict building guidelines, such as those that govern new development in historic districts around the world.

After the 2012 war in Mali, central areas of the country, including the Dogon Plateau and Bandiagara Escarpment, have become increasingly dangerous. Terrorist groups operate in the area, and violence between local ethnicities occurs on a daily basis.

As of 2018, it is extremely inadvisable to travel to this area for tourism, and Malian security forces have been known to turn back those who attempt to do so. In March 2018, an armed group attacked a hotel frequented by UN staff in the town of Bandiagara, killing several people.

== Gallery ==
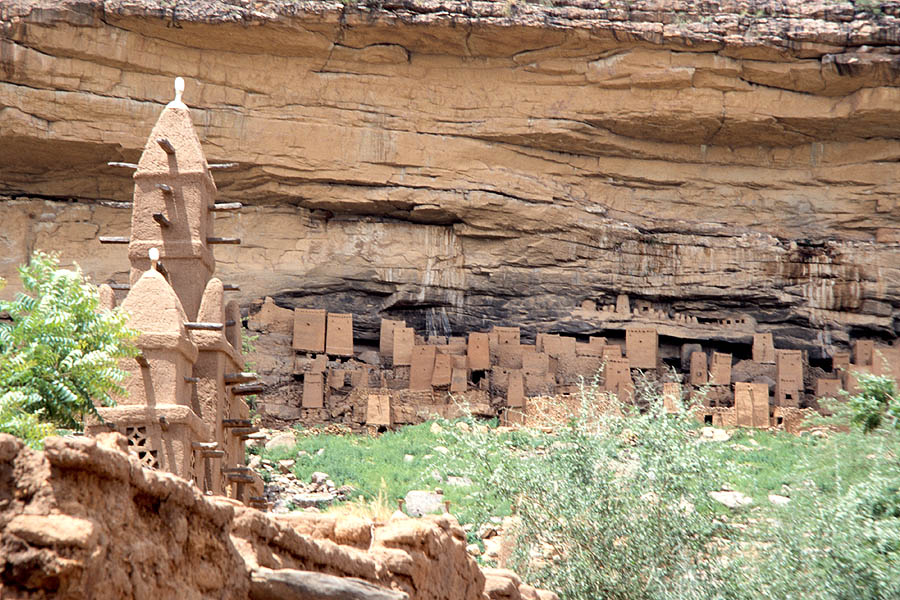
Remnant dwellings of the ancient Tellem people in the background, above the abandoned Dogon village; a mud mosque of the modern-day Dogon village is visible in the foreground

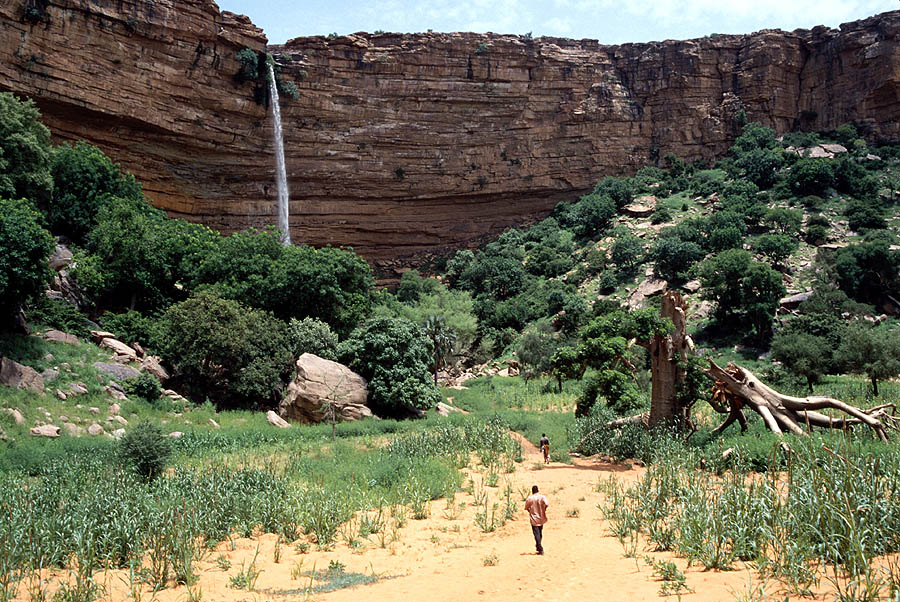
A partial view of the Bandiagara Escarpment

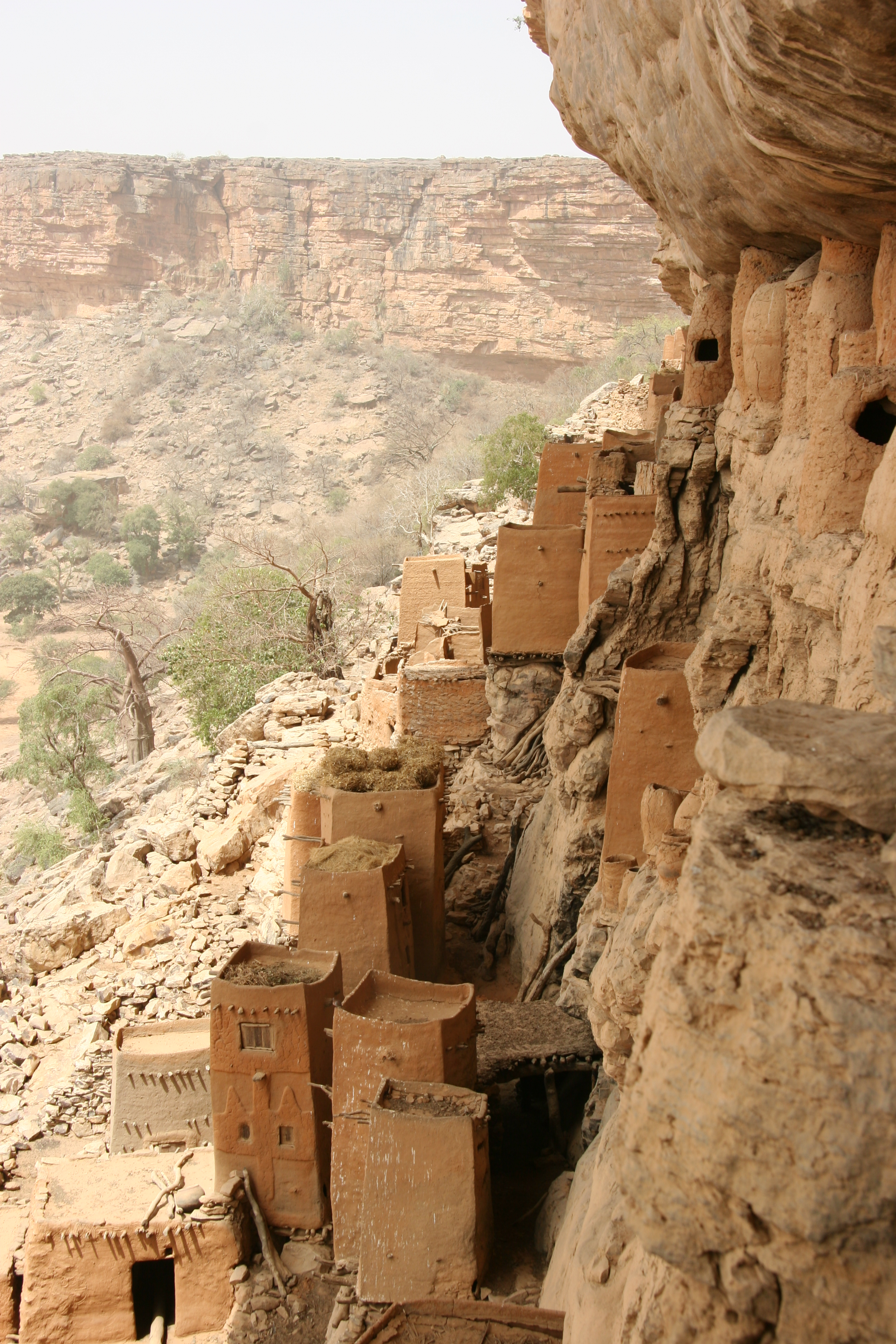

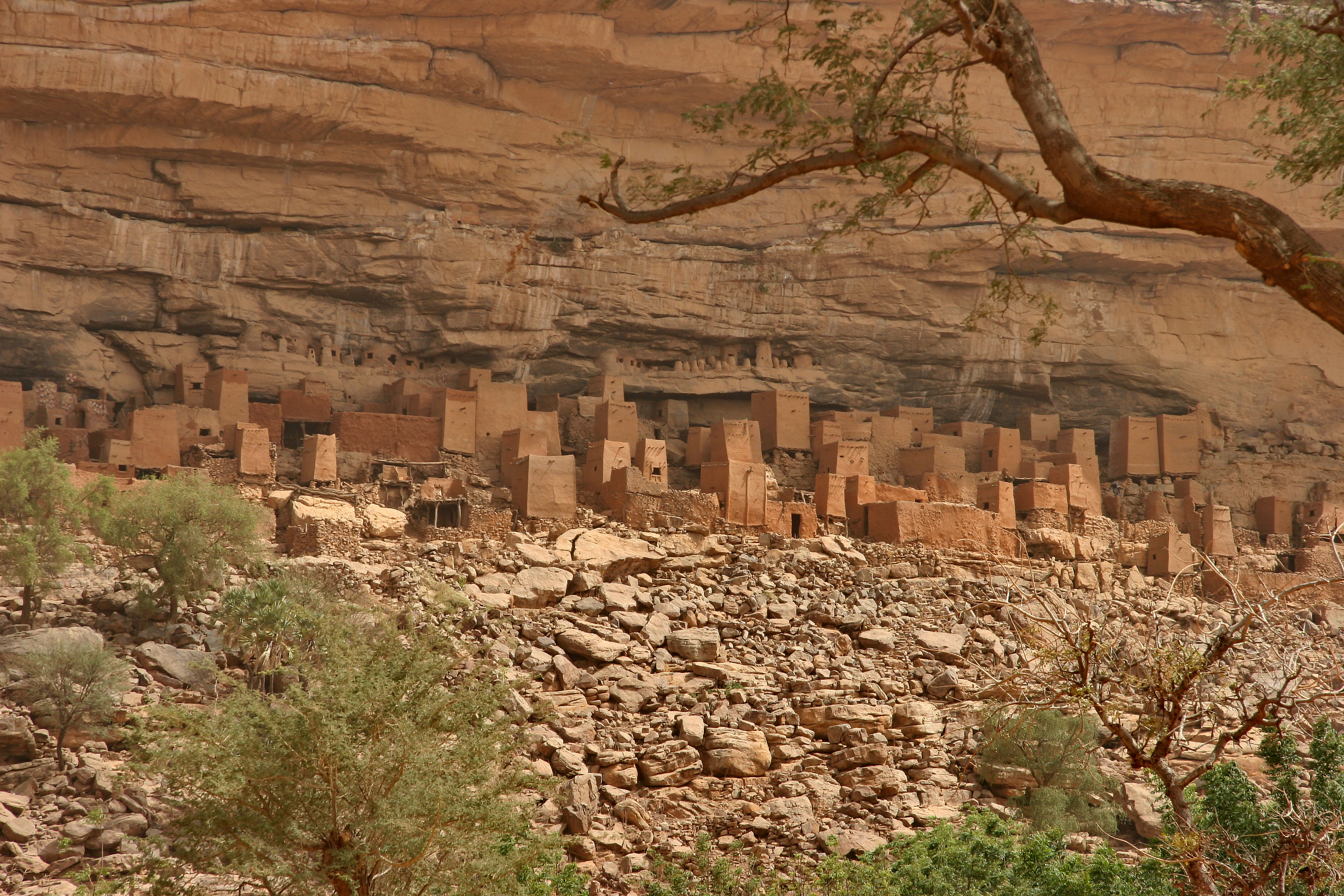

== See also ==
- List of escarpments
- Bandiagara
- Cliff Palace
