= Bandiagara Region =

Bandiagara
- Region
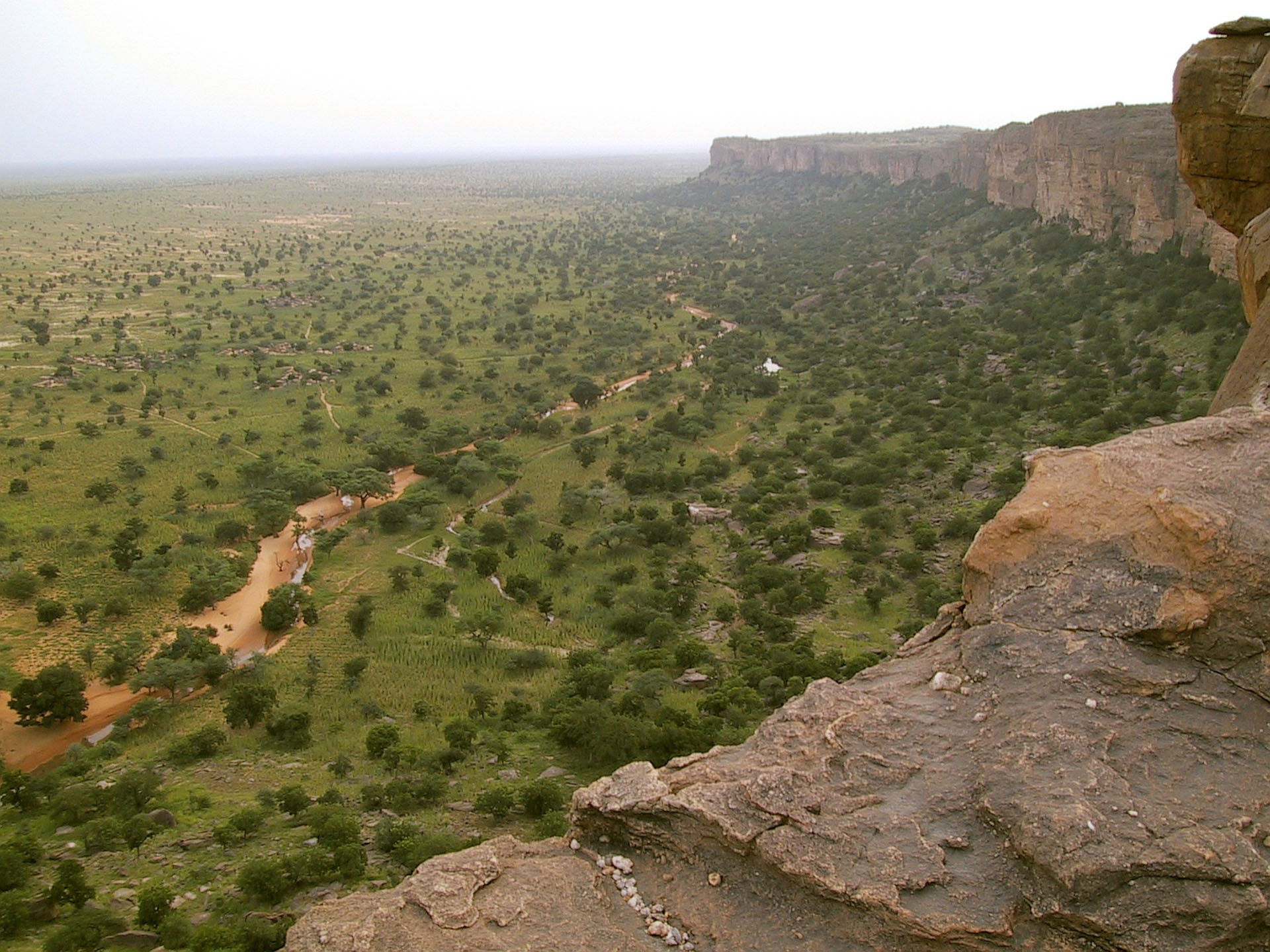
- Rocky landscape

- Location of Bandiagara Region in Mali
- Coordinates: 14.350000°N 3.616667°W
- Country: Mali
- Capital: Bandiagara

Area
  - Total: 24,850 km^{2} (9,590 sq mi)

Population (2023)
  - Total: 1,270,224
  - Density: 51.12/km^{2} (132.4/sq mi)

Bandiagara Region is an administrative region of Mali that was created from the division of Mopti Region. Its capital is the town of Bandiagara. The region includes large parts of Dogon country and is particularly known for the Cliff of Bandiagara, which has been listed as a mixed cultural and natural World Heritage Site by UNESCO since 1989.

== Etymology ==
The name of the Bandiagara Region derives from the archaic Dogon term bàndʒà-gàrá, roughly meaning "'large wooden eating bowl.'" It refers to the eating bowls made by the blacksmith caste for offering food during ceremonies.

== Geography ==
The region is located in central Mali, south of the Niger Bend, and borders Burkina Faso to the south. It covers an area of 24,850 km². The landscape is shaped by the Dogon Plateau, sandy plains and the escarpments of Bandiagara. UNESCO describes the Cliff of Bandiagara as an extensive cliff and sandstone landscape with traditional Dogon settlements, granaries, sanctuaries and meeting places.

== History ==
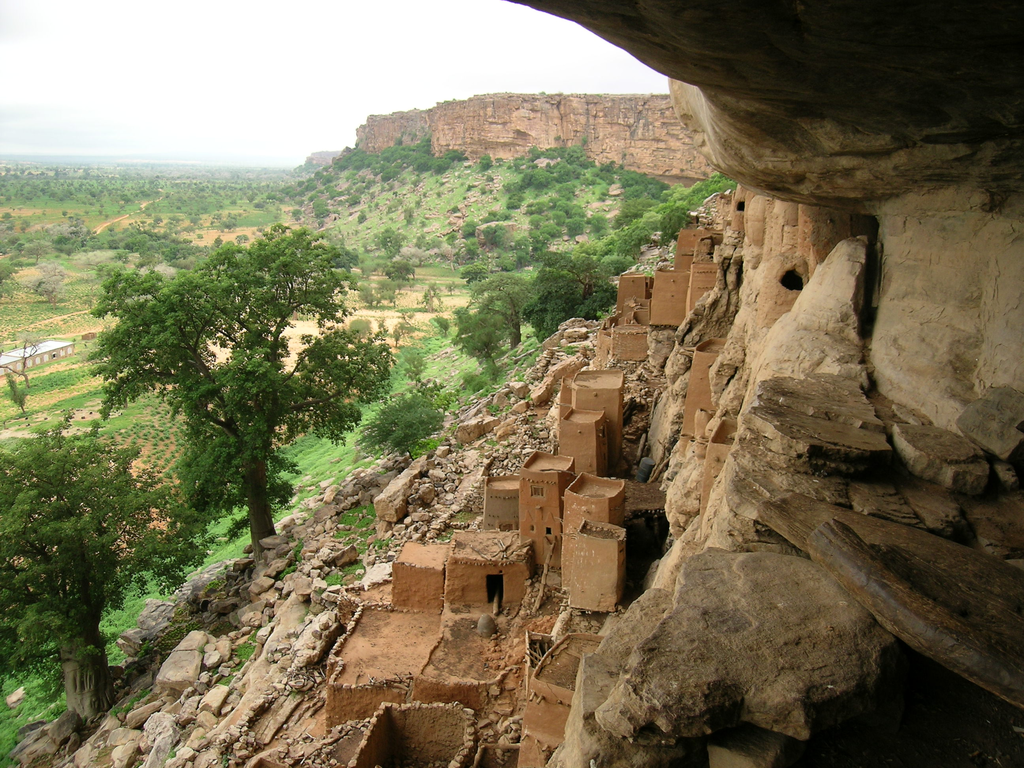
Ancient dwellings by the Cliff of Bandiagara

The area of present-day Bandiagara Region belonged to Mopti Region until the administrative reform. The creation of a separate Bandiagara Region had already been envisaged by Mali’s administrative reform of 2012, but was initially not fully implemented. Law No. 2023-006 of 13 March 2023 confirmed the new administrative division and established Bandiagara as one of the country’s regions.

== Administrative divisions ==
The region is divided into nine cercles. In total, it comprises 30 arrondissements, 53 communes and 1,024 villages and fractions.

Cercle code	Cercle	Communes
1901	Bandiagara	10
1902	Koro	16
1903	Bankass	4
1904	Kendié	5
1905	Ningari	4
1906	Diallassagou	5
1907	Sangha	2
1908	Kani	4
1909	Sokoura	3

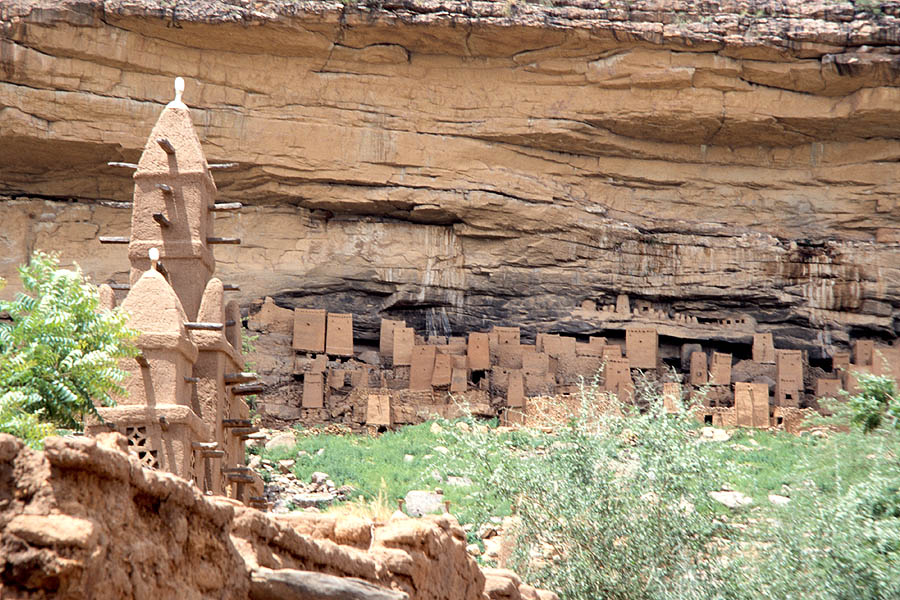
Remnant of an ancient Tellem village by the Bandiagara Escarpment behind a Dogon mosque

== Culture ==
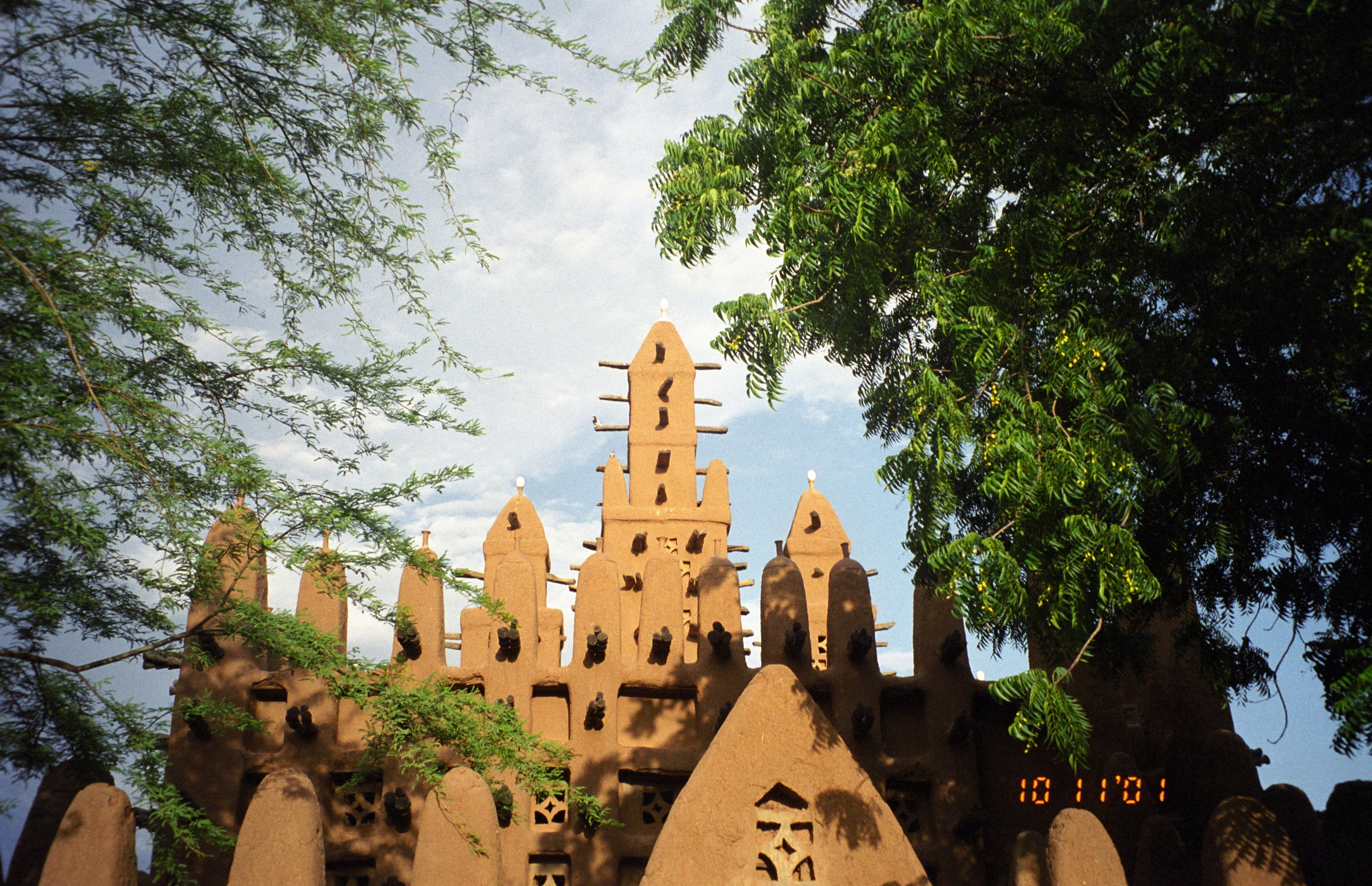
The mosque in the Dogon village of Teli near Bandiagara town

Historically, the region is closely associated with the settlement area of the Dogon. The Cliff of Bandiagara and the surrounding villages are considered one of Mali’s most important cultural areas. In addition to the traditional architecture and religious customs of the Dogon, the region has also played an important role in archaeological research into older settlement patterns in West Africa. In recent years, the area has also been affected by the security crisis in central Mali, which has severely disrupted agriculture, livestock herding, markets and tourism.

== Economy ==
The economy of the region is predominantly rural. The most important livelihoods include rain-fed agriculture, livestock herding, small-scale vegetable cultivation and local trade. On the Dogon Plateau, the main crops are millet, sorghum and shallots; wild plants, small-scale crafts and, traditionally, tourism also plays a role, although tourism has been restricted by the poor security situation in the country.

== Demographics ==
In 2023, the region had a population of 1,270,224. With a total fertility rate at 6.2 births per woman, Bandiagara has a slightly higher TFR than the Malian national average of 6.1 births per woman.

Year	Population
1998	690,740
2009	940,819
2023	1,270,224

=== Ethnicity ===
Ethnicity in Bandiagara (2022)
1. Dogon (93.4%)
2. Bambara (3.28%)
3. Mossi (1.11%)
4. Other (2.23%)
Mother tongues in Bandiagara region (2022 census)
1. Dogon (90.95%)
2. Bambara (5.24%)
3. Mossi (1.02%)
4. Fula (0.99%)
5. Other Malian (1.75%)
6. Other African (0.02%)
7. Other foreign (0.03%)

Bandiagara is one of two Malian regions, alongside Douentza, where the Dogon form the majority of the population. The Dogon comprised over 90% of the region's population in 2022. Minorities in Bandiagara include the Bambara, Mossi, and Fula.

=== Religion ===
The 2022 census found that 93.96% of the population in Bandiagara was Muslim, 5.99% was Christian, 0.04% were Animists (Dogon religion), and 0.01% practiced other religions. Most Dogon have converted to Islam but maintain traditional practices and beliefs (syncretism), with a minority being Christian.
