= Koro Cercle =

Coordinates: 14°20′N 2°50′W

- Cercle
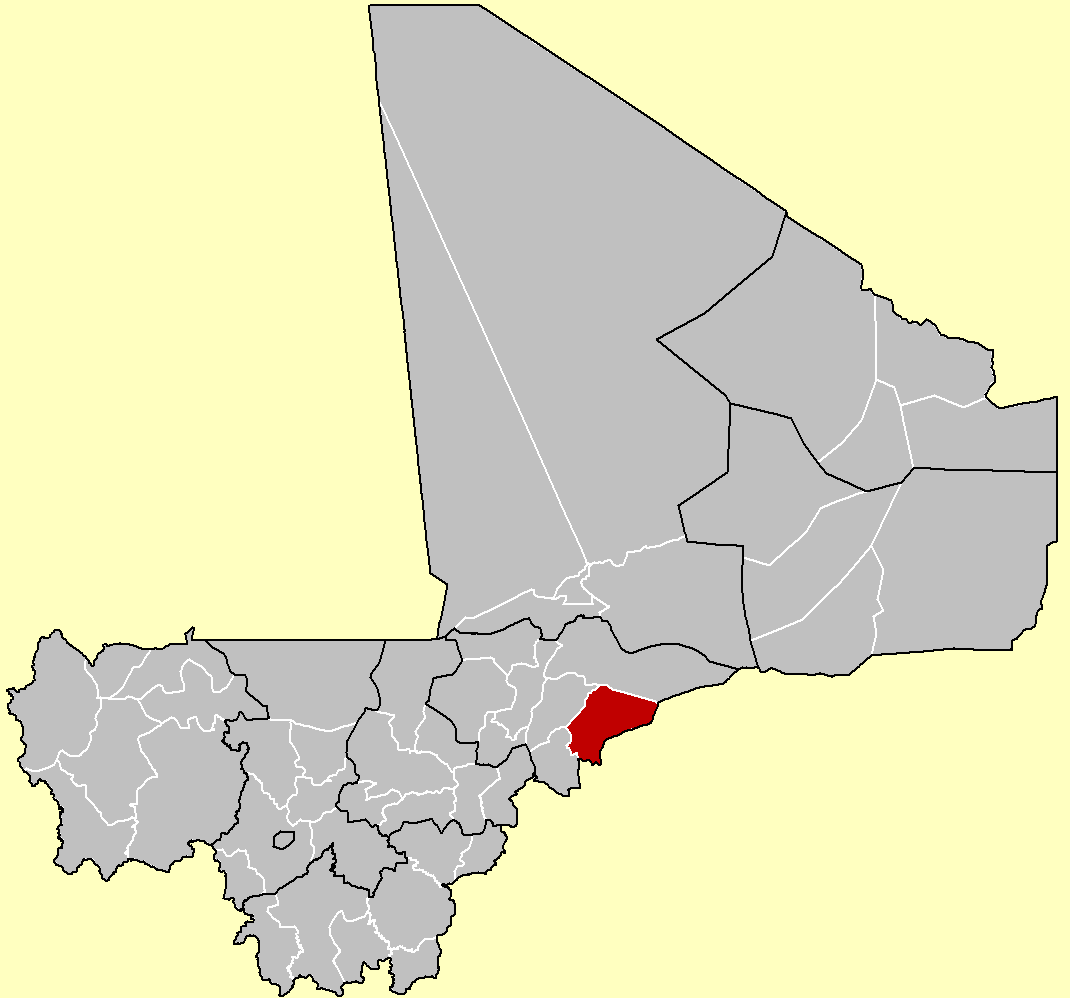
- Location of the Cercle of Koro in Mali
- Country: Mali
- Region: Bandiagara Region
- Capital: Koro

Area
  - Total: 10,937 km^{2} (4,223 sq mi)

Population (2009 census)
  - Total: 361,944
  - Density: 33.094/km^{2} (85.712/sq mi)
- Time zone: UTC+0 (GMT)

Koro Cercle is an administrative subdivision of the Bandiagara Region of Mali. The administrative center is the town of Koro.

The cercle is divided into 16 communes:

- Bamba
- Barapiréli
- Bondo
- Diankabou
- Dinangourou
- Dioungani
- Dougouténé I
- Dougouténé II
- Kassa
- Koporo Pen
- Koporokendié Na
- Koro
- Madougou
- Pel Maoudé
- Yoro
- Youdiou
