= Koulogon massacre =

2019 in Mopti Region, Mali

- Part of Mali War
- Location: Koulogon-Peul, Koulogon Habbé, Bankass Cercle, Mali
- Date: January 1, 2019
- Target: Fulani villagers
- Deaths: 39
- Injuries: 8
- Perpetrator: Dan Na Ambassagou

The Koulogon massacre took place on January 1, 2019, in a Fulani village near the town of Koulogon Habbé, Bankass Cercle, Mali.

== Prelude ==
In 2015, the Mopti region of central Mali became a hotspot for the al-Qaeda-aligned jihadist group Katibat Macina, led by Fulani preacher Amadou Koufa. The violence broke down upon ethnic lines in 2017, following attacks on Dogon and Bambara groups, traditionally farmers, against the Fulani, who are traditionally herders. Self-defense militias were formed, such as Dan Na Ambassagou and Alliance for Salvation in the Sahel. In 2018, these ethnic conflicts killed over 500 people.

== Massacre ==
On the morning of the 1st, a hundred armed men, dressed in dozo hunting outfits, attacked the village of Koulogon. Survivors later identified the attackers as Dogon, and that they were equipped with heavy weapons and not traditional dozo shotguns. Several dozen attackers headed to the mosque, opening fire on praying villagers, before storming homes and shooting at those inside. Some villagers attempted to hide with the village chief, Moussa Diallo, but Diallo was assassinated with members of his family, including children and the elderly. However, several women who hid in Diallo's wife's hut were spared. Afterwards, the assailants burned down several houses, and those who survived the massacre fled.

The Malian Army visited the site a few hours after the massacre, but the village was abandoned.

== Aftermath ==
=== Casualties ===
The Malian government stated that thirty-seven civilians were killed in the massacre, including several women and children. The bodies are buried in a mass grave near the village. Nine people were injured in the massacre as well.

On January 29, 2019, MINUSMA and the OHCHR stated that 36 civilians were killed, including a woman and four children, along with one of the perpetrators. Eight of the victims were killed and burned in their huts, and three bodies were mutilated. By June 9, the death toll had been updated to thirty-seven deaths on the spot, with two people having succumbed to their injuries. Of the 61 granaries in the town, 59 were looted, creating a dire food shortage in the town. The report also stated that the perpetrators were dozo hunters, along with a dozen civilians, all residents of neighboring villages.

=== Reactions ===
The Malian government stated in a press release that "the perpetrators of the crimes will be punished with all the rigor of the law", but this was chastised by the Fulani cultural association Tabita Pulaaku, which berated the Malian government for their inaction and called for the disarmament of the militias. The attack was condemned by France and MINUSMA as well.

Dan Na Ambassagou denied accusations they were behind the massacre.

=== Criminal proceedings ===
Seven suspects were arrested by the evening of January 2. In a visit to the village, Malian president Ibrahim Boubacar Keïta announced the construction of a permanent Malian base in Koulogon, along with 10 million francs for reconstruction of the village.
