= Ouo Sarre =

- Village
- Location in Mali
- Coordinates: 14°6′7″N 3°47′6″W
- Country: Mali
- Region: Mopti Region
- Cercle: Bandiagara Cercle
- Commune: Bara Sara
- Time zone: UTC+0 (GMT)

Ouo Sarre is a village and seat of the rural commune of Bara Sara in the Cercle of Bandiagara in the Mopti Region of southern-central Mali.
