= Kani Gogouna =

- Village
- Location in Mali
- Coordinates: 14°33′43″N 3°23′31″W
- Country: Mali
- Region: Mopti Region
- Cercle: Bandiagara Cercle
- Commune: Wadouba
- Time zone: UTC+0 (GMT)

Kani Gogouna (Kǎ:n) is a village and seat of the commune of Wadouba in the Cercle of Bandiagara in the Mopti Region of southern-central Mali. It is the administrative center (chef-lieu) of a village cluster that includes villages such as Kani-Kombole and Kani-Bonzon.

Tommo So is spoken in the village. Local surnames are Kansaye (majority), Siguipili [sìgìpîl], Kampo, Kamia, Tembiné, and Fofana.
