= Tiébanda skirmish =

2015 battle in Mali

- Part of Mali War
Date	October 28, 2015
Location	Tiébanda, Dogon country, Mali
Result	Malian victory

Belligerents
Mali	Katiba Macina

Casualties and losses
None	5–7 killed 10 injured

On October 28, 2015, a battle broke out in Tiébanda, Mali, between Katiba Macina militants and Malian forces.

== Prelude ==
On October 27, 2015, Malian forces began an anti-jihadist operation dubbed Operation Seno, and launched patrols around the cercles of Mopti, Koro, and Bandiagara in Mali's Dogon country. Operation Seno was the largest Malian operation against jihadists since the start of Operation Serval in 2013. Around the start of the operation, twelve jihadists suspected to be part of Katiba Macina, an Ansar Dine affiliate in Mopti Region, were arrested and taken to Bamako. Afterwards, Malian forces conducted operations in Bankass, Koro, Douentza, and Tominian.

== Skirmish ==
Fighting broke out in Tiébanda, near the village of Tassilima and about thirty kilometers from the Burkinabe border, on October 28. The Malian army attacked a Katiba Macina hideout in the bush, with the intel of the location having been provided by two people who were forcibly recruited by the jihadists and later escaped. The clashes lasted for six hours.

== Aftermath ==
According to a Malian ministry of defense official and a Mopti regional official interviewed anonymously by AFP, seven jihadists were killed in the skirmish and ten were injured. Weapons and equipment were seized as well, and the Malian forces did not suffer any casualties. The Malian ministry of defense released a statement on October 30 announcing the deaths of five militants.
