= Baboye =

Baboye Baboy
- Village
- Location in Mali
- Coordinates: 14°15′36″N 3°57′4″W
- Country: Mali
- Region: Mopti Region
- Cercle: Bandiagara Cercle
- Commune: Pignari
- Time zone: UTC+0 (GMT)

Baboye or Baboy is a village and seat of the commune of Pignari in the Cercle of Bandiagara in the Mopti Region of southern-central Mali.

The village is located at the base of a hill. The local language is Ampari Dogon. Local surnames are Degoga, Karambe, and Bira-Ogon.
