= San Region =

San
- Region
- UNESCO-recognised Sanke Mo festival in the San region

- Coordinates: 13.300000°N 4.900000°W
- Country: Mali
- Capital: San

Area
  - Total: 14,200 km^{2} (5,500 sq mi)

Population (2023)
  - Total: 809,615
  - Density: 57.0/km^{2} (148/sq mi)

San Region is an administrative region in southern Mali. It was created from parts of the former Ségou Region and has its capital in the town of San. The region lies between the lowland area of the Bani River, the Ségou Region and the border with Burkina Faso.

== Geography ==
San Region is located in south-central Mali, east of the city of Ségou and south of the Niger Bend. It covers an area of 14,200 km². The area lies mainly in the Sudan–Sahelian transition zone. The landscape is characterised by savannas, agricultural plains and bodies of water. The area around San is hydrologically connected with the basin of the Bani River, an important tributary of the Niger River. Rainfall is concentrated in the rainy season and largely determines agricultural yields.

== History ==
The area of present-day San Region long belonged to Ségou Region after Mali’s independence. The creation of a separate San Region had already been envisaged by the administrative reform of 2012, but was initially not fully implemented. Law No. 2023-006 of 13 March 2023 on the creation of new administrative regions in the Republic of Mali eventually confirmed the new territorial division and established San as one of the country’s regions. The former territory of San Cercle partly corresponds to the new region.

== Administrative divisions ==
The region is divided into seven cercles. According to the OCHA, it comprises 17 arrondissements, 42 communes and 832 villages.

Cercle code	Cercle	Communes
1701	San	9
1702	Tominian	5
1703	Kimparana	10
1704	Yangasso	8
1705	Fangasso	3
1706	Mandiakuy	4
1707	Sy	3

== Population ==
In 2023, the region had a population of 809,615.

Year	Population
1998	461,982
2009	612,226
2023	809,615

== Economy ==
As in most parts of Mali, the economy of San Region is shaped by agriculture, and the southern and central parts of the country are among Mali’s more important agricultural production areas. The main crops include millet, sorghum, maize, cotton and peanuts. The region also benefits from its location on important transport routes between Bamako, Ségou, Mopti and eastern Mali, as well as the neighbouring country of Burkina Faso.

== Demographics ==
Ethnicity in San (2022)
1. Bambara (31.3%)
2. Bobo / Bwa (29.0%)
3. Senufo (15.9%)
4. Fula (5.96%)
5. Dafing (4.58%)
6. Dogon (4.33%)
7. Soninke (2.47%)
8. Mandinka (1.80%)
9. Bozo (1.53%)
10. Other (3.14%)

The San Region is the tenth most populated region in Mali, with a population of 820,807 in 2022. With a total fertility rate at 7.1 births per woman, San has a higher TFR than the Malian national average of 6.1 births per woman.

=== Ethnicity ===
San Region is ethnically diverse. In 2022, the Bambara, Bobo and Bwa, and Senufo represented the largest ethnic groups in San. Smaller minorities in the region include the Fula, Dafing, Dogon, Soninke, Mandinka, and Bozo.

Mother tongues in San region (2022 census)
1. Bambara (43.47%)
2. Bobo (28.14%)
3. Minianka (12.79%)
4. Fula (3.89%)
5. Dogon (3.70%)
6. Dafing (3.53%)
7. Malinke (1.73%)
8. Other Malian (2.60%)
9. Other African (0.05%)
10. Other foreign (0.10%)

=== Religion ===
San is the most religiously diverse region in Mali, having the highest proportion of Christians, Animists, practitioners of other faiths, and people with no religion in the country.

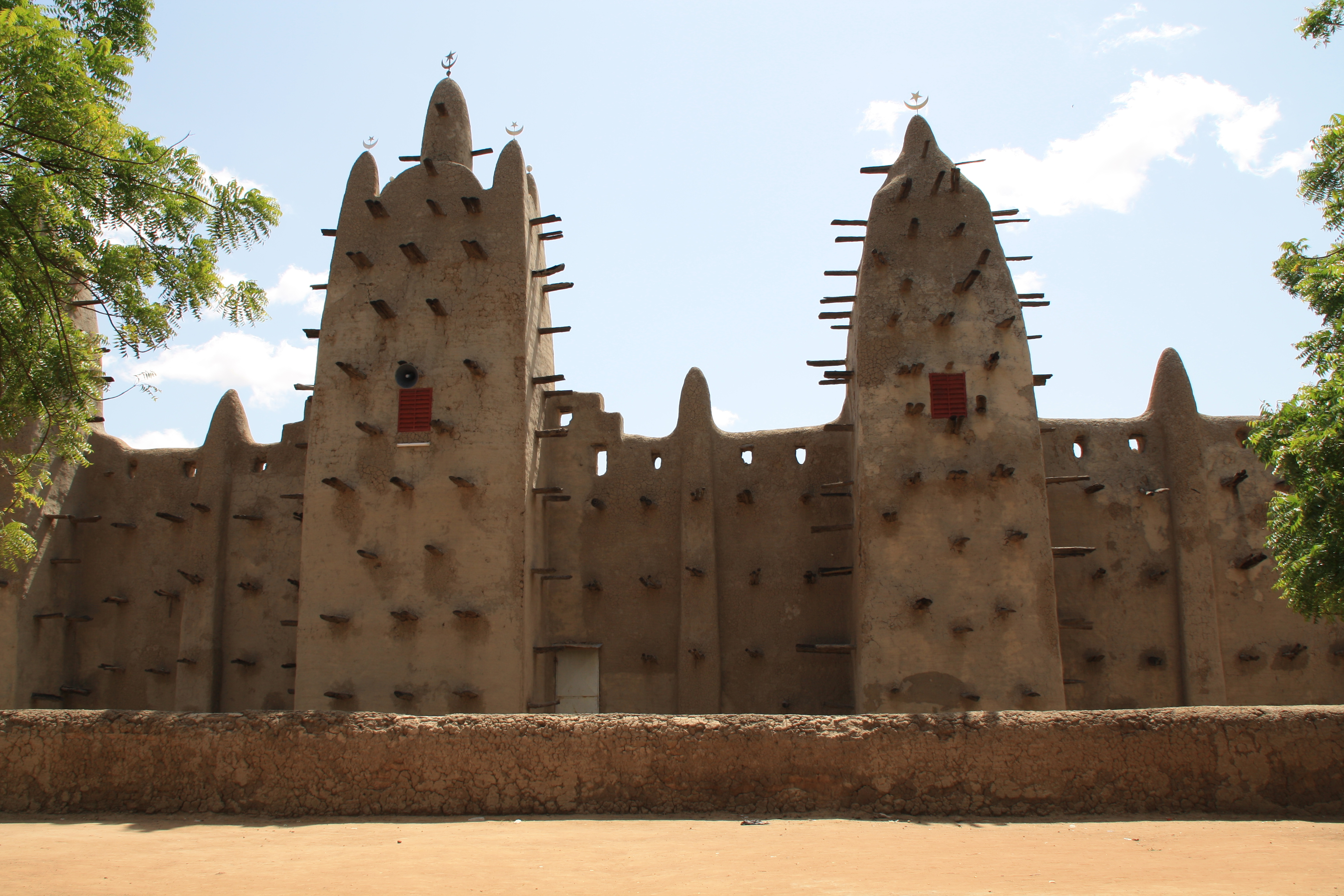
The San Mosque, an example of Sudano-Sahelian architecture

The 2022 census found that 70.10% of the population in San was Muslim, 16.99% was Christian, 8.33% was Animist, 3.65% had no religion, and 0.93% practiced other religions. In all other Malian regions, Muslims exceed 90% of the population. Many Bobo and Bwa farmers in the region have converted to Christianity but maintain traditional beliefs and practices (syncretism). A significant share of Senufo and Dogon also practice traditional faiths, though most other ethnic groups in the region are predominantly Muslim.
