= Damada =

- Village
- Location in Mali
- Coordinates: 14°44′0″N 3°10′44″W
- Country: Mali
- Region: Mopti Region
- Cercle: Bandiagara Cercle
- Commune: Metoumou
- Elevation: 678 m (2,224 ft)
- Time zone: UTC+0 (GMT)

Damada is a village and seat of the commune of Metoumou in the Cercle of Bandiagara in the Mopti Region of southern-central Mali.
