= Kargué =

- Village
- Location in Mali
- Coordinates: 14°47′38″N 3°48′50″W
- Country: Mali
- Region: Mopti Region
- Cercle: Bandiagara Cercle
- Commune: Lowol Guéou
- Elevation: 275 m (902 ft)
- Time zone: UTC+0 (GMT)

Kargué (Kàrgé) is a village and seat of the commune of Lowol Guéou in the Cercle of Bandiagara in the Mopti Region of southern-central Mali.

Kargué village is situated on the lower slope and at the base of a hill. Main economic activities are farming, herding, and gardening. Some blacksmiths also live in the village. The Bozo language is spoken in the village. Surnames in the village include Traore and Kampo.
