= Diangassagou =

- Village
- Location in Mali
- Coordinates: 13°59′46″N 3°56′28″W
- Country: Mali
- Region: Mopti Region
- Cercle: Bandiagara Cercle
- Commune: Timniri
- Time zone: UTC+0 (GMT)

Diangassagou (also spelled Diemessogou; locally pronounced Jèmè-sùgû:) is a village and seat of the commune of Timniri in the Cercle of Bandiagara of the Mopti Region of southern-central Mali.

Diangassagou consists of a compact village cluster located on a plateau. An old iron ore quarry is located in the vicinity of Diangassagou. Tomo Kan is spoken in the village of Diangassagou. Local surnames are Minta, Sanafo, Toulema, and Pamatek.
