= Guimini =

- Village
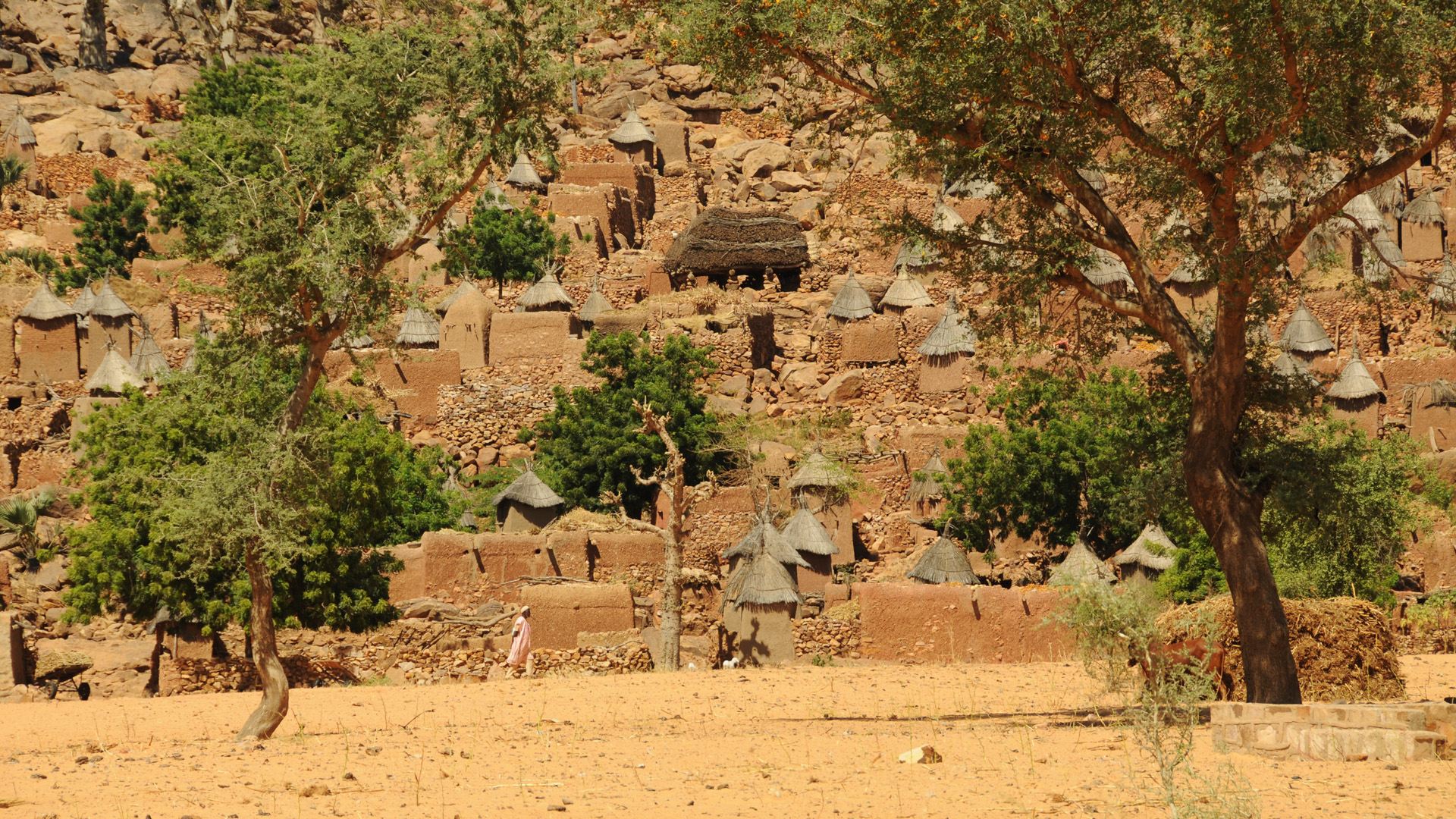

- Location in Mali
- Coordinates: 14°18′N 3°26′W
- Country: Mali
- Region: Mopti Region
- Cercle: Bandiagara Cercle
- Commune: Commune of Dourou

Population (1998)
  - Total: 6,517
- Time zone: UTC+0 (GMT)

Guimini (Gǐwⁿrⁿì) is a village in the Cercle of Bandiagara in the Mopti Region of south-eastern Mali.
