= Habe =

Habe may refer to:

== Places ==
- Habé, Burkina Faso
- Deba Habe, Nigeria
- Dimbal Habe, Mali
- Lessagou Habe, Mali

== People ==
- Hans Habe (1911-1977), pen name of János Békessy, Hungarian-Austrian writer and newspaper publisher who also held U.S. citizenship
- Marina Elizabeth Habe (1951-1968), daughter of Hans Habe
- Tadashige Habe (1916-2001), Japanese malacologist
