= Ondougou =

Ondougou Onjougou
- Commune
- Location in Mali
- Coordinates: 14°38′35″N 3°13′34″W
- Country: Mali
- Region: Mopti Region
- Cercle: Bandiagara Cercle

Population (2009 census)
  - Total: 7,182
- Time zone: UTC+0 (GMT)

Ondougou or Onjougou (ɔ̀njɔ́gɔ̀) is a rural commune in the Cercle of Bandiagara in the Mopti Region of Mali. The commune contains nine villages and in the 2009 census had a population of 7,182. The main village (chef-lieu) is Banakane. Goundaka is located near Ondougou.

Mombo is spoken in Ondougou.
