= Kani Bonzon massacre =

2023 terrorist incident in Mali

- Part of Mali War
- Location: Kani Bonzon, Bankass Cercle, Mali
- Date: February 23, 2023
- Deaths: 20+
- Injuries: 4+
- Perpetrator: Unknown jihadists

On February 23, 2023, unknown jihadists attacked the village of Kani Bonzon in Bankass Cercle, Mopti Region, Mali, killing at least twenty people.

== Background ==
Central Mali's Mopti Region has been a hotbed of violence between various jihadist groups and pro-government forces along ethnic lines since the early 2010s. These tensions are mainly between nomadic Fulani herders and Dogon self-defense groups and hunters known as dozos. Fulani groups are accused of supporting the jihadist Jama'at Nasr al-Islam wal Muslimin and its local branch, Katiba Macina. This inter-communal conflict has seen attempts for ethnic cleansing against the Fulani by dozos, which provokes attacks on Dogon villages by Fulani self-defense groups and jihadists.

== Massacre ==
The massacre took place in Kani Bonzon, a village in Bankass Cercle. One witness stated that the attack began with a small group of jihadists being spotted over a hill heading towards the town, which was followed by larger waves of jihadists. The mayor of Bankass stated that unidentified armed men burst into the village and attacked the population using guns and explosives. The attackers burned granaries and homes, and looted cattle. The attackers then began chasing survivors into the forests to kill them. A nearby hospital reported twelve bodies and four injured in their clinic, which was corroborated by Malian officials. Survivors stated at least twenty people, including women, children, and the elderly, were killed in the massacre. The attackers also kidnapped three civilians and fled with them.

The funerals took place on February 24.

== Aftermath ==
At least 1,600 people were displaced from Kani Bonzon and forced to settle in surrounding villages. Following the massacre, residents and refugees in Bandiagara protested to demand more security in the area from the Malian government. One protester begged for help from MINUSMA. 930 students were also halted from continuing schooling due to the massacre. By April 2023, many of these refugees were still in the surrounding villages and did not return to Kani Bonzon.

Malian officials visited Kani Bonzon on February 28, the delegation being led by Minister of National Reconciliation Ismaël Wagué alongside Oumarou Diarra. Survivors of the attack told Wague and Diarra to build a security post in the town, which the Malian authorities stated would happen.

A local politician attributed the attack to jihadists, but did not mention a specific group. Jihadist groups attacked the village of Tabangolo near Kani Bonzon on February 25, two days after the attack.
