= Liébé massacre =

- Part of Mali War and Anti-Fulani sentiment
- Location: Liébé, Mopti Region, Mali
- Date: October 22, 2020
- Target: Fulani civilians
- Deaths: 24
- Perpetrator: Malian Armed Forces
- Motive: Revenge for the Sokoura attack and clash

On October 22, 2020, Malian soldiers killed at least 24 people in the village of Liébé, Mopti Region, Mali. All of the victims were Fulani.

== Background ==
Throughout the Mali War, inter-ethnic clashes have erupted several times between Dogon dozos and Fulani militants over land usage stemming from the Fulani's pastoralist lifestyles and the Dogon using their land for farming. When the Mali War intensified in the Mopti Region, the jihadist Katiba Macina movement attracted many young Fulani as it overthrew the traditional Fulani caste system. Around this time, Dogon dozos formed Dan Na Ambassagou militias in Dogon areas, which were armed by the Malian government. This made inter-ethnic conflict not just between Dogon and Fulani, but often also between the jihadist Katiba Macina and the larger Jama'at Nasr al-Islam wal Muslimin against the pro-government Dan Na Ambassagou. In the area of the massacres, Dogon militants had recently launched attacks against Fulani villages, backed by the Malian government.

The town of Libe has been attacked before by pro-government militants. On February 16 and 17, 2019, Dogon militants attacked the Fulani villages of Minima Maoude-Peuhl and Liebe, near the border with Burkina Faso. Six civilians were killed in the attack on Minima Maoude-Peuhl, and twelve were killed in the attack on Liebe.

The area of Liebe is considered to be a "major jihadist stronghold". It is also a hub for internally displaced Fulani civilians from attacks in other areas of Mopti. A week prior to the massacre, militants from Katiba Macina attacked a Malian army convoy near Sokoura, killing a dozen soldiers and a dozen civilians. Malian forces launched Operation Yelema in the areas of Liebe, Baye, Ouenkoro, and Nene to counteract the jihadists. A communique by the Malian military on October 20 said that clashes broke out near Liebe between jihadists and soldiers, where five jihadists were killed.

== Massacre ==
At 11am on the morning of October 22, witnesses stated that between 15 and 20 Malian army vehicles entered the town of Liebe. Around 1,000 people were present in the town. Soldiers opened fire immediately. According to Fulani human rights organization Tabital Pulaaku, some villagers were in their fields and others were at a market in the neighboring town of Baye. The majority of the victims were over the age of 50, and survivors testified that the soldiers didn't "try to find out who was who". The soldiers torched granaries and fields, and shot livestock. One survivor said that a group of six people were blindfolded and executed. At least 24 people were killed in the massacre; all of the victims were Fulani.

The Malian government denied responsibility for the attack, but confirmed that military operations were ongoing in the area.
