= Burkina Faso–Mali border =

International border

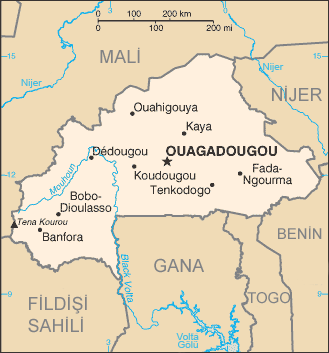
Map of Burkina Faso, with Mali to the north

The Burkina Faso–Mali border is 1,325 km (823 mi) in length and runs from the tripoint with Ivory Coast in the west to the tripoint with Niger in the east.

== Description ==
The border starts in the west at the tripoint with Ivory Coast on the Léraba river. The highest point of Burkina Faso, Mount Tenakourou lies less than 3 kilometres (2 miles) from the border here. It then proceeds to the north via a series of smaller riverine and overland sections, before reaching the Ngorolaka river. The border then follows this river east, then proceeds towards the north-east, utilising various overland sections as well as rivers such as the Sourou, before reaching the tripoint with Niger.

== History ==
As a result of the Scramble for Africa in the 1880s France had gained control the upper valley of the Niger River (roughly equivalent to the areas of modern Mali and Niger). France occupied this area in 1900; Mali (then referred to as French Sudan) was originally included, along with modern Niger and Burkina Faso, within the Upper Senegal and Niger colony and became a constituent of the federal colony of French West Africa (Afrique occidentale française, abbreviated AOF).

The internal divisions of AOF underwent several changes during its existence; what are now Mali, Niger and Burkina Faso were initially united as Upper Senegal and Niger, with Niger constituting a military territory ruled from Zinder. The Niger military territory was split off in 1911, becoming a separate colony in 1922, and Mali and Upper Volta (Burkina Faso) were constituted as separate colonies in 1919. During the period 1932-47 Upper Volta was abolished and its territory split out between French Sudan, Niger and Ivory Coast. The precise date the Mali-Upper Volta boundary was drawn appears to be uncertain, though it is thought to have been created at the time of the formal institution of Upper Volta in 1919.

As the movement for decolonisation grew in the post-Second World War era, France gradually granted more political rights and representation for their sub-Saharan African colonies, culminating in the granting of broad internal autonomy to French West Africa in 1958 within the framework of the French Community. Eventually, in 1960, both Mali and Upper Volta (renamed Burkina Faso in 1984) gained independence, and their mutual frontier became an international one between two states.

As the precise on-the-ground demarcation of the boundary was frequently unclear, in 1968 the two states agreed to set up a joint commission to examine border demarcation. As the commission failed to come to a mutually satisfactory agreement, tensions began mounting between the two states, most notably over the easternmost section of the border known as the Agacher Strip, believed to be rich in minerals. Fighting then erupted in late 1974, continuing into the new year, before an Organisation of African Unity-sponsored ceasefire took effect by which both states agreed to set up a technical commission to resolve the dispute peacefully. Tensions mounted yet again, especially after Thomas Sankara seized power in Upper Volta in 1982. Fighting erupted in 1985 in the so-called Christmas War. A ceasefire was declared, and the case was referred to the International Court of Justice, which split the territory almost equally between the two states in 1986.

In more recent years the border has become insecure owing to the fallout from the Mali War.

== Settlements near the border ==
=== Burkina Faso ===
- Koloko
- Ngorouerla
- Dan Maissara
- Faramana
- Tassila
- Ben
- Bangassi
- Kolokan
- Vouoro
- Illa
- Que
- Tiao
- Dounkou
- Nohoro
- Loroni
- Soro
- Sindio
- Tou
- Petegoli
- Diguel

=== Mali ===
- Loulouni
- Mandela
- Mahou
- Gbangan
- Lonha
- Mafune
- Wanian
- Benena
- Koula
- Yehere
- Nioukoundara
- Ouankoro
- Kare
- Bai
- Ombo
- Tongore
- Sobangouma
- Batou
- Yoro
- Dionouga
- Douna
