= Dé, Mali =

Dé
- Village
- Location in Mali
- Coordinates: 14°46′44″N 3°15′32″W
- Country: Mali
- Region: Mopti Region
- Cercle: Bandiagara Cercle
- Commune: Diamnati
- Time zone: UTC+0 (GMT)

Dé (Fulfulde: De:; Tommo So: Dɛ̌:) is a village and seat of the commune of Diamnati in the Cercle of Bandiagara of the Mopti Region of southern-central Mali.

Although Fulfulde is the primary language of Dé, the residents have Dogon names. Tommo So is also spoken by some residents.
