= Sougui =

- Village
- Location in Mali
- Coordinates: 14°39′54″N 3°16′16″W
- Country: Mali
- Region: Mopti Region
- Cercle: Bandiagara Cercle
- Commune: Ségué Iré
- Time zone: UTC+0 (GMT)

Sougui is a village and seat of the commune of Ségué Iré in the Cercle of Bandiagara of the Mopti Region of southern-central Mali.
