= Bara Sara =

- Commune
- Location in Mali
- Coordinates: 14°6′7″N 3°47′6″W
- Country: Mali
- Region: Mopti Region
- Cercle: Bandiagara Cercle

Population (2009 census)
  - Total: 15,408
- Time zone: UTC+0 (GMT)

Bara Sara is a rural commune in the Cercle of Bandigara in the Mopti Region of Mali, near the border of Burkina Faso. The commune contains 23 villages and in the 2009 census had a population of 15,408. The main village is Ouo Sarre.
