= Kani-Kombole =

- Village
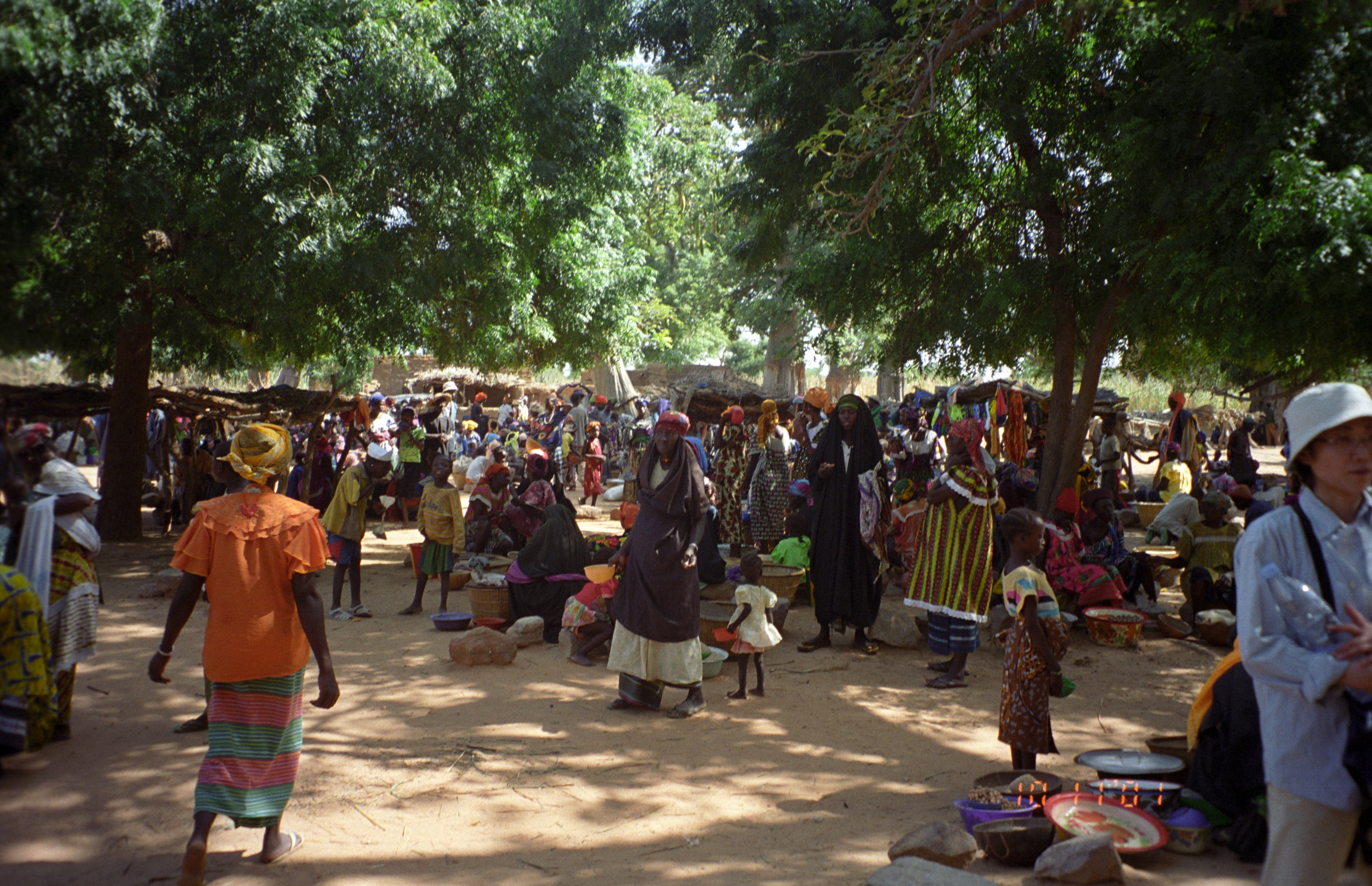
- Market

- Location in Mali
- Coordinates: 14°9′N 3°35′W
- Country: Mali
- Region: Mopti Region
- Cercle: Bankass Cercle
- Time zone: UTC+0 (GMT)

Kani-Kombole (Kà:n-kómbòlò) is a Dogon village in the Cercle of Bankass in the Mopti Region of south-eastern Mali. It is part of the Kani village cluster.

The village has a mosque.

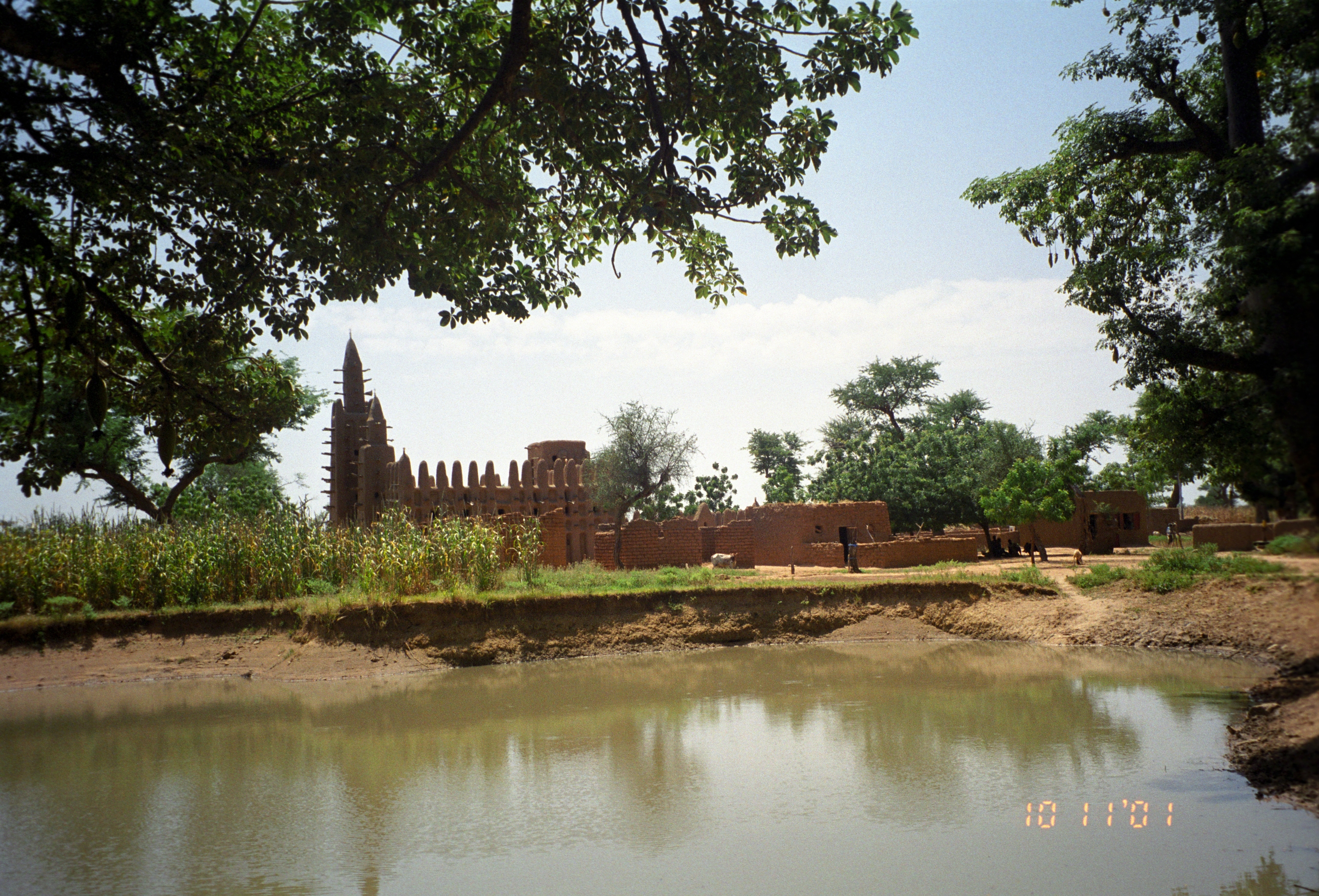
Kani-Kombole Mosque
