= Diamnati =

- Commune
- Location in Mali
- Coordinates: 14°46′44″N 3°15′32″W
- Country: Mali
- Region: Mopti Region
- Cercle: Bandiagara Cercle

Population (2009 census)
  - Total: 13,349
- Time zone: UTC+0 (GMT)

Diamnati is a commune in the Cercle of Bandigara in the Mopti Region of Mali. The commune contains 11 villages and at the time of the 2009 census had a population of 13,349. The main village of Dé lies 62 km northeast of Bandiagara.
