= Segue (disambiguation) =

A segue is a smooth transition or spin-off from one topic or section to the next.

Segue may also refer to:

== Geography ==
- Segue, Mali, a small town in Mali

Segue galaxies small satellite galaxies (or star clusters) of the Milky Way galaxy

- Segue 1
- Segue 2
- Segue 3

== Music ==
- "Segue", several interludes by Prince on Love Symbol Album
- "Segue", several interludes by Carmen Electra from Carmen Electra
- Segue (album)

== Other ==
- SEGUE, Sloan Extension for Galactic Understanding and Exploration
- Segue Software, now part of the Borland division of Micro Focus

== See also ==
- Segway
