= Wadouba =

- Commune
- Location in Mali
- Coordinates: 14°33′43″N 3°23′31″W
- Country: Mali
- Region: Mopti Region
- Cercle: Bandiagara Cercle

Population (2009 census)
  - Total: 28,101
- Time zone: UTC+0 (GMT)

Wadouba is a commune in the Cercle of Bandigara of the Mopti Region of Mali. The commune contains 46 small villages and in the 2009 census had a population of 28,101. The administrative centre (chef-lieu) is the village of Kani Gogouna.
