= Borko, Mali =

Borko
- Commune and village
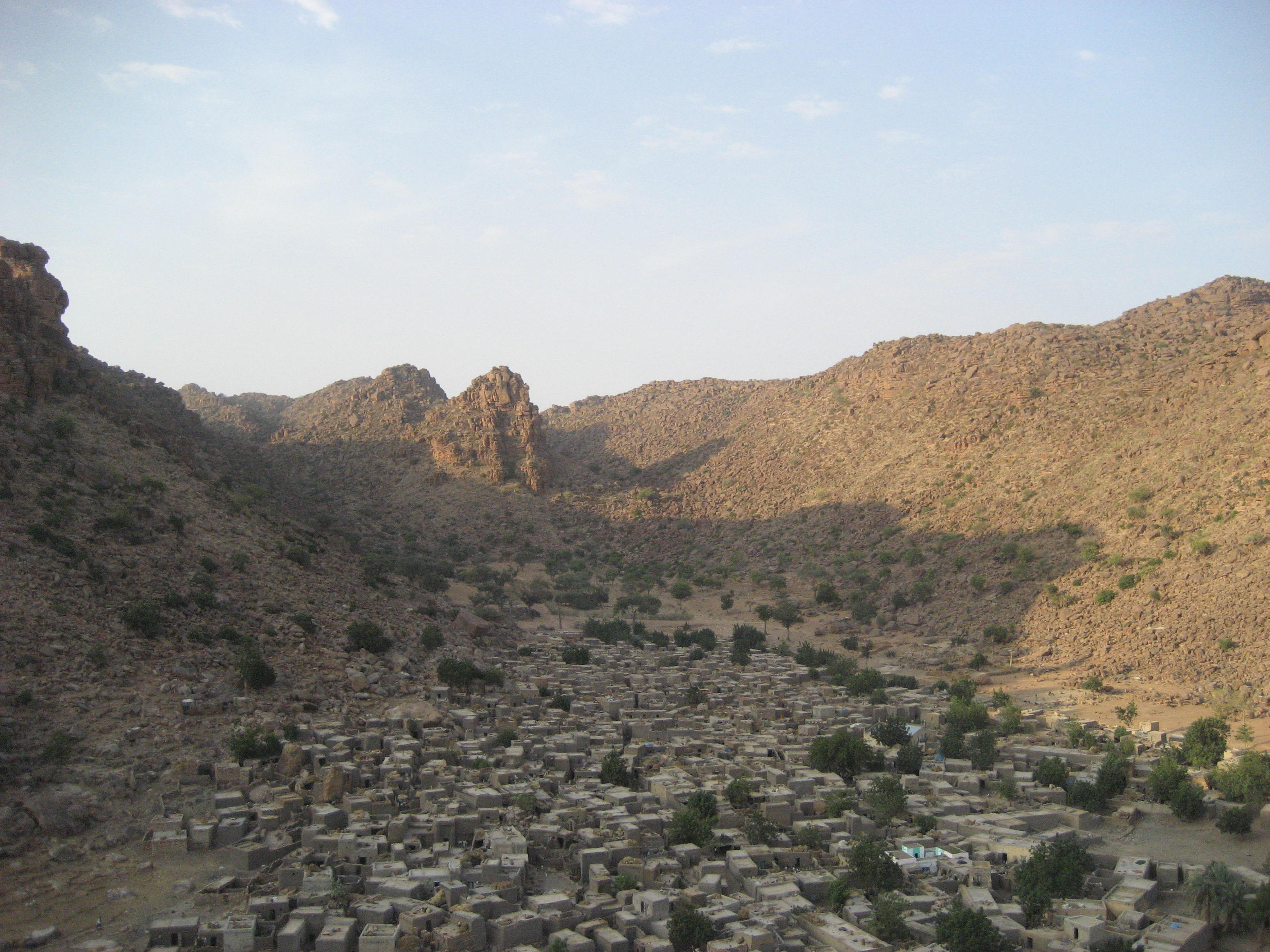
- Borko at sunrise

- Location in Mali
- Coordinates: 14°57′0″N 3°21′14″W
- Country: Mali
- Region: Mopti Region
- Cercle: Bandiagara Cercle

Population (2009 census)
  - Total: 5,798
- Time zone: UTC+0 (GMT)

Borko is a village and rural commune in the Cercle of Bandiagara of the Mopti Region of Mali. The village lies on the edge of the Dogon Plateau, 105 km northwest of Mopti and 73 km north-northwest of Bandiagara. In the 2009 census the commune had a population of 6,254. The village is set in a valley, and is only accessible by one entrance.

Najamba-Kindige is spoken in the village of Borko.

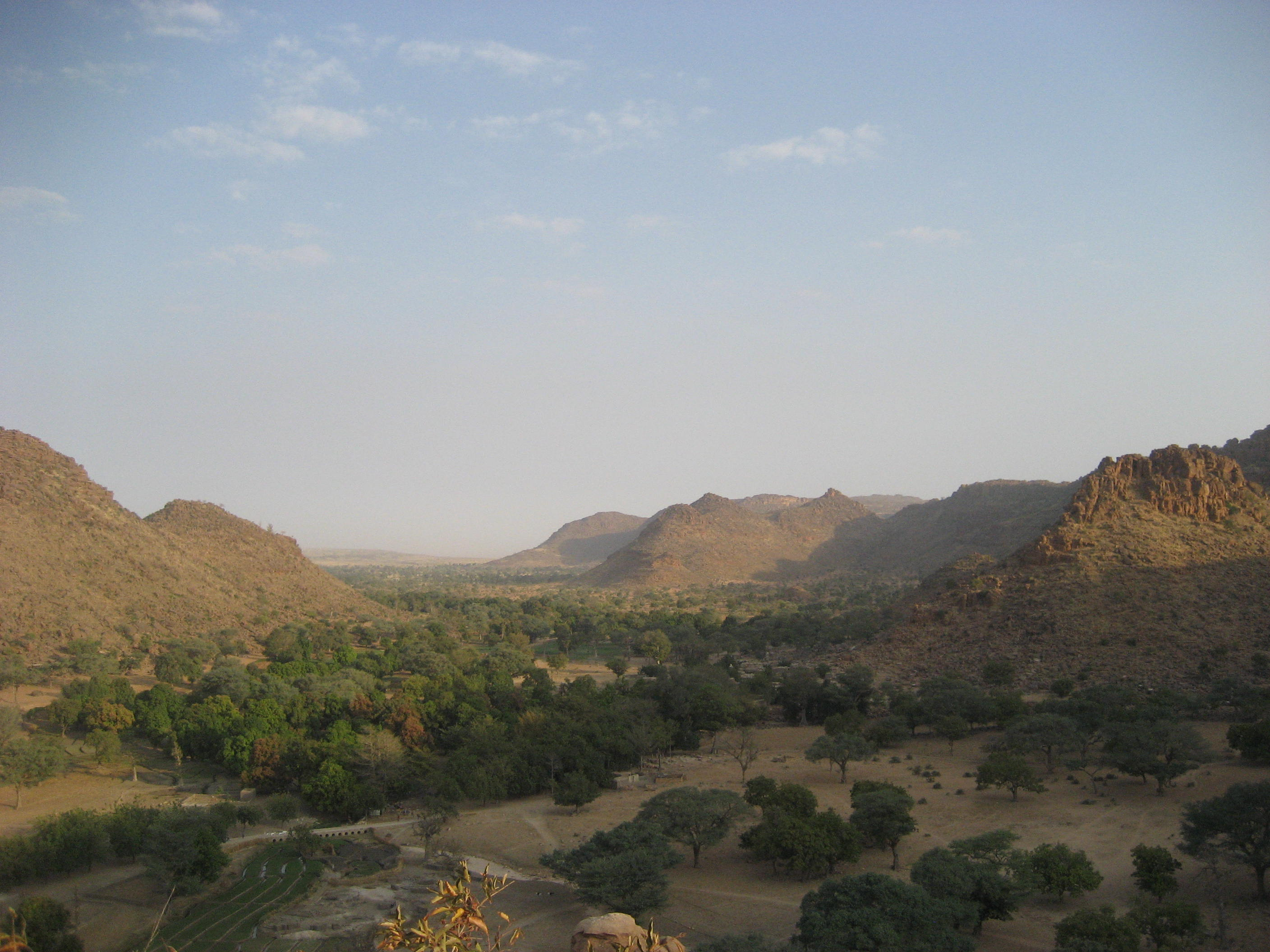
The unique farming style is visible in the lower left corner. The bridge was built by German engineers in 2007-2008 and now provides direct road access to Bandiagara.
