= Kendé, Mali =

Kendé
- Commune and village
- Location in Mali
- Coordinates: 14°42′10″N 3°25′0″W
- Country: Mali
- Region: Mopti Region
- Cercle: Bandiagara Cercle

Population (2009 census)
  - Total: 7,372
- Time zone: UTC+0 (GMT)

Kendé is a village and rural commune in the Cercle of Bandiagara of the Mopti Region of Mali. The commune contains five villages and at the time of the 2009 census had a population of 7,372.

The village of Kendé is situated on a plateau. Tommo So is spoken in the village. The local surname is Senguipiri [sèŋèpîl].
