= Timniri =

- Commune
- Location in Mali
- Coordinates: 13°59′40″N 3°56′30″W
- Country: Mali
- Region: Mopti Region
- Cercle: Bandiagara Cercle

Population (2009 census)
  - Total: 20,637
- Time zone: UTC+0 (GMT)

Timniri is a rural commune in the Cercle of Bandigara of the Mopti Region of Mali. The commune contains 29 villages and in the 2009 census had a population of 20,637. The administrative centre (chef-lieu) is the village of Diangassagou.
