= Kani-Bonzon =

Kanibonzon Kani-Bonzon
- Commune and town
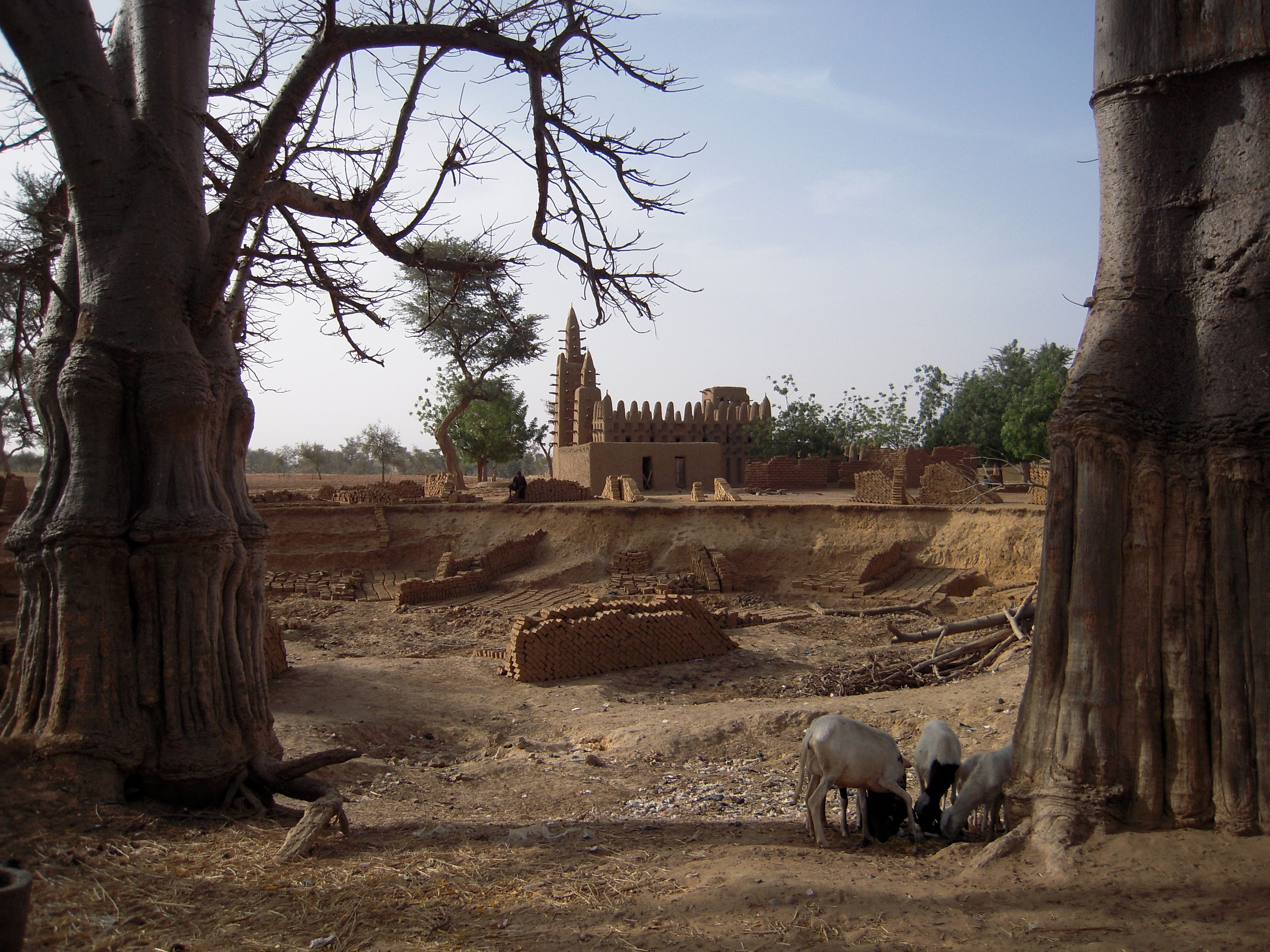

- Location in Mali
- Coordinates: 14°08′25″N 3°37′06″W
- Country: Mali
- Region: Mopti Region
- Cercle: Bankass Cercle
- Elevation: 436 m (1,430 ft)

Population (2009)
  - Total: 13,046
- Time zone: UTC+0 (GMT)

Kanibonzon or Kani-Bonzon (Kǎ:n-bɔ̀ⁿzɔ̂ⁿ) is a small town and commune in the Cercle of Bankass in the Mopti Region of Mali. It is part of the Kani village cluster. In 1998 the commune had a population of 9,497.

== Twin cities ==
- Podenzano, Italy
