= Soumbala =

Soumbala may refer to:

- Sumbala
- Soumbala, Mali
