= Pelou =

- Commune and village
- Location in Mali
- Coordinates: 14°20′35″N 3°26′31″W
- Country: Mali
- Region: Mopti Region
- Cercle: Bandiagara Cercle

Population (2009 census)
  - Total: 4,348
- Time zone: UTC+0 (GMT)

Pelou (Pɛ̀:lú) is a village and rural commune in the Cercle of Bandiagara of the Mopti Region of Mali. The commune contains four villages and in the 2009 census had a population of 4,348.

The village is situated on a rocky plateau. Farming, gardening, and herding are the main economic activities. Donno So is spoken in Pelou. The local surname is Tembély.
