= Dandoli =

- Commune and town
- Location in Mali
- Coordinates: 14°23′53″N 3°32′42″W
- Country: Mali
- Region: Mopti Region
- Cercle: Bandiagara Cercle

Population (2009 census)
  - Total: 9,853
- Time zone: UTC+0 (GMT)

Dandoli (Dànnólì) is a small village and rural commune in the Bandiagara Cercle of the Mopti Region of Mali in West Africa. The commune contains 14 villages and in the 2009 census had a population of 9,853. The village of Dandoli lies 10 km northeast of Bandiagara.

Dandoli village is situated on a plateau overlooking a river that flows to Bandiagara. It is located on the road from Sangha to Bandiagara. Crops planted by residents included onion, tobacco, and others. Donno So is spoken in the village. Local surnames are Ouologuem and Tembeli.
