= Goundaka =

- Village
- Location in Mali
- Coordinates: 14°29′59″N 3°56′47″W
- Country: Mali
- Region: Mopti Region
- Cercle: Bandiagara Cercle
- Commune: Pignari Bana
- Elevation: 288 m (945 ft)
- Time zone: UTC+0 (GMT)

Goundaka is a village and seat of the commune of Pignari Bana in the Cercle of Bandiagara of Mopti Region of southern-central Mali.
