= Lougourougoumbou =

- Commune
- Interactive map of Lougourougoumbou
- Coordinates: 14°24′41.4″N 3°27′22.5″W
- Country: Mali
- Region: Mopti Region
- Cercle: Bandiagara Cercle

Government
  - Chef de Village: Nindiou Kassougué

Area
  - Total: 1 km^{2} (0.39 sq mi)

Population (2010)
  - Total: estimated 600−700
- Time zone: UTC+0 (GMT)

Lougourougoumbou (Lúgùrù-gùmmɔ́) is a commune in the Cercle of Bandigara in the Mopti Region of Mali. The population was estimated to be 600 - 700 people in the year 2010. The village is located about 17 km north-east from Bandiagara. The current mayor, or "Chef de Village" of Lougourougoumbou is Nindiou Kassougué, and has been since 1982.

== Overview ==
Lougourougoumbo village is situated on a plateau overlooking a river that flows down to Bandiagara. The village is located on the road leading from Sangha to Bandiagara. Onions, tobacco, mangoes, and other crops are grown in the village. Donno So is spoken in the village. The local surname is Nantoumbe.

== Economy ==
The main source of income of the villagers in Lougourougoumbou is the selling of specially prepared onions. The onions are mashed up with a morser, and packed together to balls of about 10 cm - 20 cm diameter, and dried in the sun. These clumps of onions are then sold in bazaars in villages and towns nearby, where they can again be exported all throughout Mali. The amount of harvest, and therefore the amount of possible export, is dependent on the weather conditions throughout the season.

== History of education since 1995 ==
In 1995 the Kinderhilfswerk für die Dritte Welt planned and built a school building for the Village. The necessary capital (50.000DM was raised by the Lessing-Gymnasium Köln in various fundraising events between 1994 and 1996 Another building was built in 1997 again financed by further fundraisers of the Lessing-Gymnasium Köln.

In order to pay teachers and supply educational material in the two school buildings, the Lessing-Gymnasium Köln organises a "Mali-Week" every year as well as a yearly Charity contest, which included the band "Bläck Fööss" in the year 2009.
