= Kendié =

Kendié Kenndié
- Commune and village
- Location in Mali
- Coordinates: 14°40′30″N 3°30′40″W
- Country: Mali
- Region: Mopti Region
- Cercle: Bandiagara Cercle
- Elevation: 498 m (1,634 ft)

Population (2009 census)
  - Total: 24,359
- Time zone: UTC+0 (GMT)

Kendié or Kenndié (Kènjé) is a village and rural commune in the Cercle of Bandiagara of the Mopti Region of Mali. The commune contains 34 villages and had a population of 24,359 in the 2009 census.

Kendié is a large regional village with a Wednesday weekly market. It is located on a high location on a plateau, not far from valleys.

On 4 February 2026, JNIM militants attacked Dozo militia base, killing five and injuring four. On May 12 2026, JNIM militants once again attacked the town and looted most of the shops.
