= Tori, Mali =

Tori
- Commune and town
- Location in Mali
- Coordinates: 13°37′N 3°43′W
- Country: Mali
- Region: Mopti Region
- Cercle: Bankass Cercle

Population (1998)
  - Total: 10,438
- Time zone: UTC+0 (GMT)

Tori (Tôw) is a small town and commune in the Cercle of Bankass in the Mopti Region of Mali. In 1998 the commune had a population of 10,438.

Tomo Kan is spoken in the village of Tori.
