= Dogani Béré =

- Commune and village
- Location in Mali
- Coordinates: 14°53′31″N 3°25′30″W
- Country: Mali
- Region: Mopti Region
- Cercle: Bandiagara Cercle

Population (2009)
  - Total: 2,400
- Time zone: UTC+0 (GMT)

Dogani Béré (Dògàn-bɛ̀lɛ́) is a village and rural commune in the Cercle of Bandiagara of the Mopti Region of Mali. The commune contains five villages and at the time of the 2009 census had a population of 2400. The village cluster is called Dogani, while Dogani Béréw is the name of the main village. The other villages are Menthi, Kounde, Gobina, and Sirou.

Najamba-Kindige is spoken in the village. Local surnames are Sangalaba, Gaba, Ogolba, Molba, and Diombele.
