= Dourou =

- Commune and village
- Location in Mali
- Coordinates: 14°18′N 3°26′W
- Country: Mali
- Region: Mopti Region
- Cercle: Bandiagara Cercle

Area
  - Total: 617 km^{2} (238 sq mi)

Population (2009 census)
  - Total: 19,411
  - Density: 31.5/km^{2} (81.5/sq mi)
- Time zone: UTC+0 (GMT)

Dourou (Dúrù) is a village and rural commune in the Bandiagara Cercle of the Mopti Region of Mali. The commune contains 28 villages along the Bandiagara Escarpment which together at the time of the 2009 census had a population of 19,411. Around 95 percent of the population is Dogon with the remainder being Fulani.

== See also ==
- Guimini
