= Pignari Bana =

- Commune
- Location in Mali
- Coordinates: 14°29′59″N 3°56′47″W
- Country: Mali
- Region: Mopti Region
- Cercle: Bandiagara Cercle

Population (2009 census)
  - Total: 28,258
- Time zone: UTC+0 (GMT)

Pignari Bana is a commune in the Bandiagara Cercle in the Mopti Region of Mali. The commune contains 23 villages and in the 2009 census had a population of 28,258. The main village (chef-lieu) is Goundaka.
