= Soroly =

- Commune and village
- Location in Mali
- Coordinates: 14°26′28″N 3°29′10″W
- Country: Mali
- Region: Mopti Region
- Cercle: Bandiagara Cercle

Population (2009 census)
  - Total: 7,885
- Time zone: UTC+0 (GMT)

Soroly (or Soroli) (Sóllù) is a village and commune in the Cercle of Bandiagara of the Mopti Region of Mali. It is situated on a rocky plateau. Donno So is spoken in the village. Local surnames are Guindo, Tapily, Kélépily, and Kassogué. The commune contains nine villages and in the 2009 census had a population of 7,885.
