= Sanekuy =

Municipality in Mali

Coordinates: 13°04′17″N 4°36′52″W

Sanekuy is a Bobo village and commune in Mali. It is part of Tominian Cercle in the Ségou Region. It is located 27 km from the town of Tominian. The commune had a population of 12144 in 1998. The village has about 5000 inhabitants.

The Name Sanekuy refers to it founder's name Sanibè Dembélé and kuy is the name for town or quarter in Bomu (bobo language). Created in the 16th century, the villagers have the Family name DEMBELE and came from the Mandé.

The village has a special traditional festival that take place every year in September for 4 nights celebrating the French colonizers failure to catch them.
