= Pignari =

- Commune
- Location in Mali
- Coordinates: 14°15′36″N 3°57′4″W
- Country: Mali
- Region: Mopti Region
- Cercle: Bandiagara Cercle
- Elevation: 311 m (1,020 ft)

Population (2009 census)
  - Total: 14,630
- Time zone: UTC+0 (GMT)

Pignari is a commune in the Cercle of Bandigara in the Mopti Region of Mali. The commune contains 19 villages and in the 2009 census had a population of 14,630. The main village (chef-lieu) is Baboye.
