= Metoumou =

- Commune
- Location in Mali
- Coordinates: 14°44′0″N 3°10′44″W
- Country: Mali
- Region: Mopti Region
- Cercle: Bandiagara Cercle

Population (2009 census)
  - Total: 13,940
- Time zone: UTC+0 (GMT)

Metoumou is a commune in the Cercle of Bandigara of the Mopti Region of Mali. The commune contains 22 villages and in the 2009 census had a population of 13,940. The main village (chef-lieu) is Damada.
