= Lowol Guéou =

- Commune
- Location in Mali
- Coordinates: 14°47′38″N 3°48′50″W
- Country: Mali
- Region: Mopti Region
- Cercle: Bandiagara Cercle

Population (2009 census)
  - Total: 11,348
- Time zone: UTC+0 (GMT)

Lowol Guéou is a commune in the Cercle of Bandigara in the Mopti Region of Mali. The commune contains 19 villages and in the 2009 census had a population of 11,348. The main village is Kargué.
