= Doucoumbo =

- Commune and village
- Location in Mali
- Coordinates: 14°21′18″N 3°39′22″W
- Country: Mali
- Region: Mopti Region
- Cercle: Bandiagara Cercle

Population (2009 census)
  - Total: 11,510
- Time zone: UTC+0 (GMT)

Doucoumbo or Doucombo is a village and rural commune in the Bandiagara Cercle of the Mopti Region of Mali. The commune contains 24 villages and at the time of the 2009 census had a population of 11,510. The village of Doucoumbo is 5 km west of Bandiagara on the RN15 that links Bandiagara to Sévaré.
