= Sokoura attack =

Terrorist attack in Mali on 13 October 2020

- Part of Mali War
Date	13 October 2020
Location	Sokoura, Mali
Result	Indecisive

Belligerents
Mali	Jama'at Nasr al-Islam wal Muslimin

Casualties and losses
11 killed, several wounded	13 killed (per Mali)
- 12 civilians killed in a bus attack

On 13 October 2020, jihadists from al-Qaeda linked group Jama'at Nasr al-Islam wal Muslimin (JNIM) attacked a Malian military base in Sokoura, Malian reinforcements attempting to relieve the troops at the base were ambushed by more jihadists at the bridge in Parou, with the ensuing firefight killing 12 civilians. The attack was the deadliest attack in Mali since Bah Ndaw took power in a coup in August.

== Battle ==
Around 1 am, JNIM fighters arrived at the military base in Sokoura on foot and in military vehicles. The Malian soldiers stationed at the base called for reinforcements, who were ambushed at a bridge in Paroukou. At the bridge, Malian military vehicles hit a VBIED around 8:30 am, at which point jihadists hiding nearby ambushed the stunned soldiers. A civilian bus headed towards the market in Bankass that was following the Malian troops in Paroukou was shot at during the battle on the bridge, killing twelve civilians including two women and a baby.

== Casualties and aftermath ==
Following the attack, Malian officials stated that nine soldiers were killed and several were wounded during the attack on Sokoura, while three were killed and ten wounded in Paroukou. Malian officials also initially stated nine jihadists were killed, although this number was raised to thirteen days later. Two vehicles were also destroyed during airstrikes on jihadist positions during the battle in Paroukou.

On November 17, 2020, 22 militants from an unknown group raided Sokoura a second time, burning down the secondary school of the town. On January 11, 2021, two civilians were executed by Malian troops as they followed their military vehicles back to the military base in the town, accused of planting an IED.
