= Ségué Iré =

- Commune
- Location in Mali
- Coordinates: 14°39′54″N 3°16′16″W
- Country: Mali
- Region: Mopti Region
- Cercle: Bandiagara Cercle

Population (2009 census)
  - Total: 14,099
- Time zone: UTC+0 (GMT)

Ségué Iré is a rural commune in the Cercle of Bandigara of the Mopti Region of Mali. The commune contains 18 villages and in the 2009 census had a population of 14,099. The administrative centre (chef-lieu) is the village of Sougui.
