= Lessing-Gymnasium Köln =

Coordinates: 50.8668°N 7.0549°E

The Lessing-Gymnasium Köln is a grammar school located in Zündorf, a suburb in the southern part of Cologne.

== Bilingual branch ==
Students are able to study some subjects in English instead of German. Additionally to the German Abitur, students can earn the International Baccalaureate, so the school is ranked as a world school.

== Supporting schools in Mali ==
The Lessing-Gymnasium supports a school in Lougourougoumbou, Mali through fundraising activities. Pupils can participate in the so-called "Mali-AG" voluntarily and plan projects. The schools saves money with having solar cells on the roof generating electrical energy for the school itself. The money which needn't be invested in electricity is spent to the school in Lougourougoumbou. For that project the Lessing-Gymnasium was awarded as "Energiesparmeister"(literally: master of saving energy).
