= Lessagou Habe =

- Commune and town
- Location in Mali
- Coordinates: 13°49′N 3°36′W
- Country: Mali
- Region: Mopti Region
- Cercle: Bankass Cercle

Population (1998)
  - Total: 11,646
- Time zone: UTC+0 (GMT)

Lessagou Habe (Lè-sɔ̀gû:) is a small town and commune in the Cercle of Bankass in the Mopti Region of Mali. In 1998 the commune had a population of 11,646.

The local language is Tomo kan.
