= Sokoura, Mali =

Sokoura
- Commune and town
- Location in Mali
- Coordinates: 13°30′N 3°46′W
- Country: Mali
- Region: Mopti Region
- Cercle: Bankass Cercle

Population (1998)
  - Total: 26,478
- Time zone: UTC+0 (GMT)

Sokoura (Sò-kúrá) is a small town and commune in the Cercle of Bankass in the Mopti Region of Mali. In 1998 the commune had a population of 26,478.

A Manding dialect is spoken in the town.
