= Timissa =

- Commune and town
- Location in Mali
- Coordinates: 13°49′N 4°12′W
- Country: Mali
- Region: Ségou Region
- Cercle: Tominian Cercle

Population (1998)
  - Total: 14,829
- Time zone: UTC+0 (GMT)

Timissa is a small town and commune in the Cercle of Tominian in the Ségou Region of Mali. As of 1998 the commune had a population of 14,829.
