= Yasso, Mali =

Yasso
- Commune and town
- Location in Mali
- Coordinates: 14°8′N 3°41′W
- Country: Mali
- Region: Ségou Region
- Cercle: Tominian Cercle

Population (1998)
  - Total: 10,841
- Time zone: UTC+0 (GMT)

Yasso is a small town and commune in the Cercle of Tominian in the Ségou Region of Mali. In 1998 the commune had a population of 10,841.
