= Diora, Mali =

Coordinates: 13°00′31″N 4°49′48″W

Diora
- Commune and town
- Interactive map of Diora
- Country: Mali
- Region: Ségou Region
- Cercle: Tominian Cercle

Population (1998)
  - Total: 12,305
- Time zone: UTC+0 (GMT)

Diora is a small town and commune in the Cercle of Tominian in the Ségou Region of Mali. As of 1998 the commune had a population of 12,305.
