= Lanfiala =

- Commune and town
- Interactive map of Lanfiala
- Coordinates: 13°29′37″N 04°08′55″W
- Country: Mali
- Region: Ségou Region
- Cercle: Tominian Cercle

Population (1998)
  - Total: 5,136
- Time zone: UTC+0 (GMT)

Lanfiala is a small town and commune in the Cercle of Tominian in the Ségou Region of Mali. In 1998 the commune had a population of 5,136.
