= Baye, Bandiagara =

Baye
- Commune and town
- Location in Mali
- Coordinates: 14°38′N 3°14′W
- Country: Mali
- Region: Bandiagara Region
- Cercle: Bankass Cercle

Population (1998)
  - Total: 21,859
- Time zone: UTC+0 (GMT)

Baye is a small town and commune in the Cercle of Bankass in the Bandiagara Region of Mali. In 1998 the commune had a population of 21,859.
