= Alliance for Salvation in the Sahel =

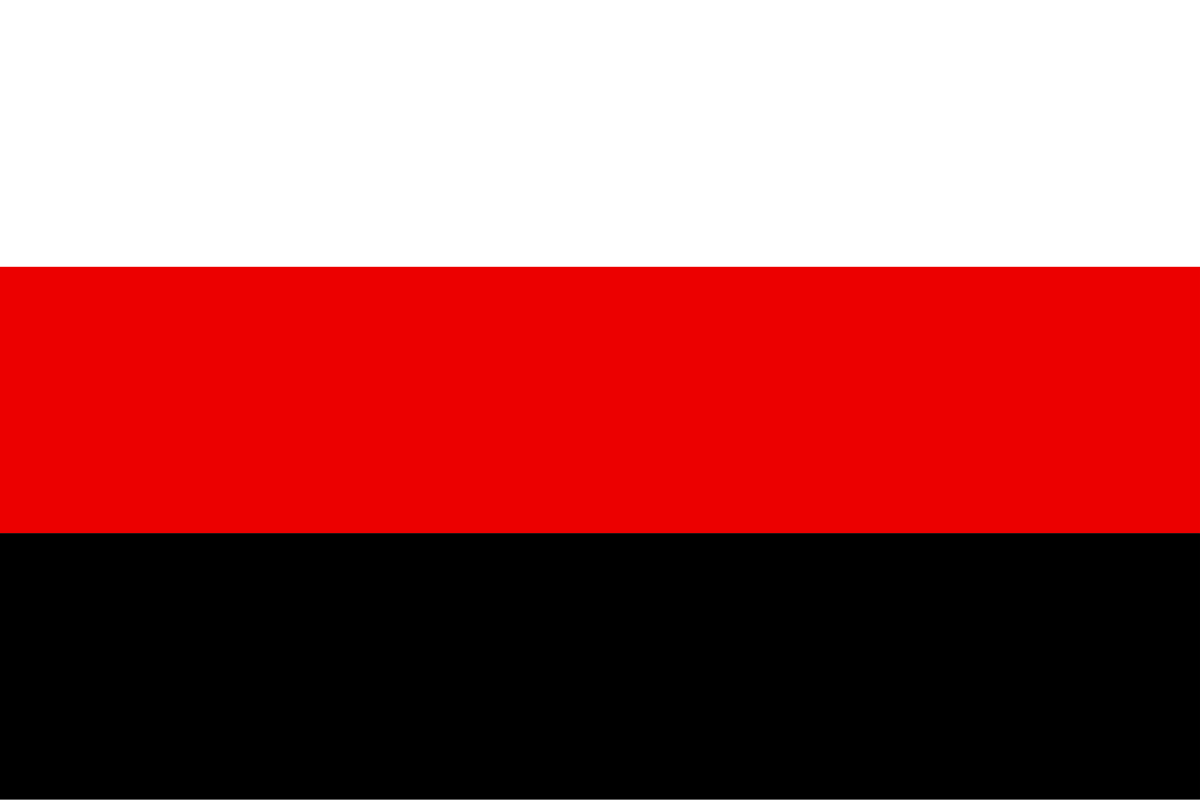
- Leader: Bacar Sow
- Dates active: May 2018 - present
- Ideology: Fulani nationalism

The Alliance for Salvation in the Sahel is a Fulani political and military group formed in 2018 during the Mali War.

== Foundation ==
The creation of the Alliance for Salvation in the Sahel (ASS) was announced in May 2018, although preparations to create the group began eight to nine months earlier. The group is active in central Mali, where a communal conflict between Fulani pastoralists and Dogon farmers is ongoing in Mopti Region. The ASS was formed to fight against atrocities committed against Fulani civilians and villages by the Dogon dozo hunters, who accuse them of being jihadists tied to Jama'at Nasr al-Islam wal Muslimin. In the first statement by the group, the ASS denounced JNIM and other jihadist groups, which are composed mainly of Fulani.

The ASS did not declare war on the Malian army, but criticized the Malian government for neglecting the region and not developing or building infrastructure. The ASS claimed to have the support of "politicians and military men", along with international support.

== Organization ==
The founder and leader of the ASS is nicknamed Bacar Sow, but his real name is unknown. The ASS claims to have over a hundred fighters, mainly from Nampala, Bambara Maoudé, and Boulikessi, as well as some fighters from other armed groups. The ASS adopted a flag with three horizontal lines; a white on top, red in the middle, and black at the bottom.

The International Federation for Human Rights (FIDH) and the Malian Association for Human Rights reported in 2018 that the ASS appears to be commanded from Bamako and "according to an influential member of the Fulani community, the ASS is essentially made up of young Malian, Nigerian and Burkinabe Fulani, and its hierarchy is composed of civil servants and soldiers from the Fulani community, some of whom occupy high positions within the Malian administration."

Human Rights Watch reported in December 2018 that the movement's goal was to bring together all existing self-defense groups in Fulani villages into a single organization. Due to a lack of funding, the ASS has failed to bring existing groups into their ranks or attract new ones. Dogon militants do not distinguish between the ASS and jihadist groups. The ASS claimed two attacks against dozos in May 2018 in Bouma, Douentza Cercle and Yoro, Koro Cercle. The attacks killed eight dozos.
