= Koulogon Habbé =

- Commune and town
- Location in Mali
- Coordinates: 14°38′N 3°14′W
- Country: Mali
- Region: Mopti Region
- Cercle: Bankass Cercle

Population (2004)
  - Total: 9,890
- Time zone: UTC+0 (GMT)

Koulogon Habé or Koulogon Habbé is a small town and commune in the Cercle of Bankass in the Mopti Region of Mali. In 1998 the commune had a population of 9,189 and grew to 9,890 by 2004.

The municipality was created by Law No. 96-059 of 4 November 1996. The nine villages in the commune are mainly populated by the Dogon and Fulani peoples.

== Geograph ==
Located in the plain of Seno, the soils are sandy. There is no perennial surface water and groundwater, only some seasonal ponds during the rainy season. The water at depth is barely exploited.

Sparse natural vegetation is composed of a few species such as balanza, plum tree, Bombax trees, shea trees, tamarind, baobab, neem and acacia etc. In terms of wildlife, there are hares, squirrels, reptiles, partridges, hawks, storks, crows, etc.

== Economy ==
Koulogon is located in the area called the Séno which, with a rainfall of 500 mm per year is conducive to the cultivation of millet. A portion of the crop is sold to merchants from Mopti and Burkinabe neighbours. Other crops are also present including groundnuts, cowpeas, and sesame. Due to soil depletion and declining rainfall, yields are declining.

Cattle is an important industry in the commune; sheep, goats, donkeys, horses, pigs and poultry are also common.

== Education ==
The municipality has two community schools—at Koulogon and Soguina, three madrasas (locally 'medersa'), at Koulogon, Soguina and Anamoïla. These three locations also house the municipality's three literacy centres.
