= Ouan =

- Commune and town
- Location in Mali
- Coordinates: 13°42′N 4°24′W
- Country: Mali
- Region: Ségou Region
- Cercle: Tominian Cercle

Population (1998)
  - Total: 9,165
- Time zone: UTC+0 (GMT)

Ouan is a small town and commune in the Cercle of Tominian in the Ségou Region of Mali. In 1998 the commune had a population of 9,165.
