= Dimbal Habe =

- Commune and town
- Location in Mali
- Coordinates: 14°1′N 3°37′W
- Country: Mali
- Region: Mopti Region
- Cercle: Bankass Cercle

Population (1998)
  - Total: 11,306
- Time zone: UTC+0 (GMT)

Dimbal Habe (Jùmbâ:, Jùmbá) is a small town and commune in the Cercle of Bankass in the Mopti Region of Mali. Tomo kan is spoken in Dimbal, and the local village surname is Tessougue.

In 1998 the commune had a population of 11,306.
