= Soubala =

- Commune and village
- Location in Mali
- Coordinates: 13°51′48″N 3°30′7″W
- Country: Mali
- Region: Mopti Region
- Cercle: Bankass Cercle

Area
  - Total: 153 km^{2} (59 sq mi)
- Elevation: 270 m (890 ft)

Population (2009 census)
  - Total: 12,332
  - Density: 80.6/km^{2} (209/sq mi)
- Time zone: UTC+0 (GMT)

Soubala is a village and rural commune in the Cercle of Bankass in the Mopti Region of Mali. The commune contains 9 villages and in the 2009 census had a population of 12,332.
