= Segue, Mali =

Segue
- Commune and town
- Location in Mali
- Coordinates: 13°50′N 3°45′W
- Country: Mali
- Region: Mopti Region
- Cercle: Bankass Cercle

Population (1998)
  - Total: 17,868
- Time zone: UTC+0 (GMT)

Segue (Sɛ̀gɛ̂:) is a small town and commune in the Cercle of Bankass in the Mopti Region of Mali. In 1998 the commune had a population of 17,868.

The main village of Segue is situated on the top of a cliff overlooking sandy plains. Most of the inhabitants are Catholic, with some Muslims as well. A Catholic is located in the main village of Segue. Tomo Kan is spoken in Segue. A weekly Sunday market is held in the town.

Local surnames include Somboro, Sanggala, Dioundo, Tolofoudié, Sokanda, and Tioubé.
