= Mafoune =

- Commune and town
- Location in Mali
- Coordinates: 12°47′N 4°22′W
- Country: Mali
- Region: Ségou Region
- Cercle: Tominian Cercle

Population (1998)
  - Total: 16,141
- Time zone: UTC+0 (GMT)

Mafoune is a small town and commune in the Cercle of Tominian in the Ségou Region of Mali. As of 1998 the commune had a population of 16,141. It lies near the border with Burkina Faso.
