= Douentza Region =

Douentza
- Region
- Coordinates: 15.000000°N 2.950000°W
- Country: Mali
- Capital: Douentza

Area
  - Total: 23,310 km^{2} (9,000 sq mi)

Population (2023)
  - Total: 446,179
  - Density: 19.14/km^{2} (49.58/sq mi)

Douentza Region is an administrative region in Mali. It was created from parts of the Mopti Region and has its capital in the town of Douentza.

== Geography ==
Douentza Region is located in central Mali, east of Mopti, and borders Burkina Faso to the south-east. It covers an area of 23,310 km². The area lies mainly within the Sahel and is characterised by dry savannas, plains, pastureland and isolated rocky massifs. In the east of the region lies the area around Hombori, near which the Hombori Tondo, the highest elevation in Mali, is located.

== History ==
The area of present-day Douentza Region long belonged to Mopti Region after Mali’s independence. The creation of a separate Douentza Region had already been envisaged as part of the administrative reform of 2012. The original reform approach provided for the former Douentza Cercle to be separated from Mopti Region and formed into a new region. Law No. 2023-006 of 13 March 2023 on the creation of administrative districts in the Republic of Mali finally implemented the new territorial division and established Douentza as a separate region.

Historically, Douentza belongs to the Sahelian area between the Inner Niger Delta, Dogon country and the eastern Gourma. The area was shaped by farming, nomadic and semi-nomadic livestock herding and local trade relations. The town of Douentza lies on the important road connection between Mopti and Gao and therefore developed into a regional market and transport centre. Since the beginning of the Mali crisis in 2012, the region has been affected by insecurity, armed groups, displacement and restrictions on trade and mobility.

== Administrative divisions ==
The region is divided into six cercles. It comprises 18 arrondissements, 24 communes and 273 villages.

Cercle code	Cercle	Communes
1801	Douentza	10
1802	Boré	3
1803	Hombori	2
1804	N'Gouma	3
1805	Mondoro	3
1806	Boni	3

== Population ==
In 2023, the region had a population of 446,179. Settlement patterns are characterised by a combination of sedentary farming, semi-nomadic livestock herding and local market centres.

Year	Population
1998	155,831
2009	246,625
2023	446,179

== Economy ==
The economy of Douentza Region is based mainly on livestock farming, agriculture and local trade. In the area of the former Douentza Cercle, both pure pastoralism and mixed forms of rain-fed farming and livestock herding are practised; crops grown are mainly cereals intended for subsistence use. Livestock farming is particularly important in the drier parts of the region.

== Demographics ==
Ethnicity in Douentza (2022)
1. Dogon (50.0%)
2. Fula (22.7%)
3. Bambara (10.3%)
4. Songhai (7.55%)
5. Tuareg (5.64%)
6. Arab (0.76%)
7. Other (3.03%)

The Douentza Region is the third least populated region in Mali, with a population of 170,189 in 2022. With a total fertility rate at 5.1 births per woman, Douentza has a lower TFR than the Malian national average of 6.1 births per woman.

=== Ethnicity ===
In 2022, the Dogon formed the majority of the region's population at 50.03%, with the Fula and Bambara forming significant minorities. Smaller minorities in Douentza include the Songhai, Tuareg, and Arabs (Maure).

Mother tongues in Mopti region (2022 census)
1. Dogon (47.84%)
2. Fula (24.19%)
3. Bambara (12.07%)
4. Songhai (7.36%)
5. Tuareg (5.53%)
6. Other Malian (2.93%)
7. Other African (0.04%)
8. Other foreign (0.04%)

=== Religion ===
The 2022 census found that 99.64% of the population in Douentza was Muslim, 0.34% was Christian, and 0.01% were Animists (Dogon religion), and 0.01% practiced other religions. Most Dogon in the region have converted to Islam but maintain traditional practices and beliefs (syncretism).
