= Tominian Cercle =

Coordinates: 13°15′N 4°25′W

- Cercle
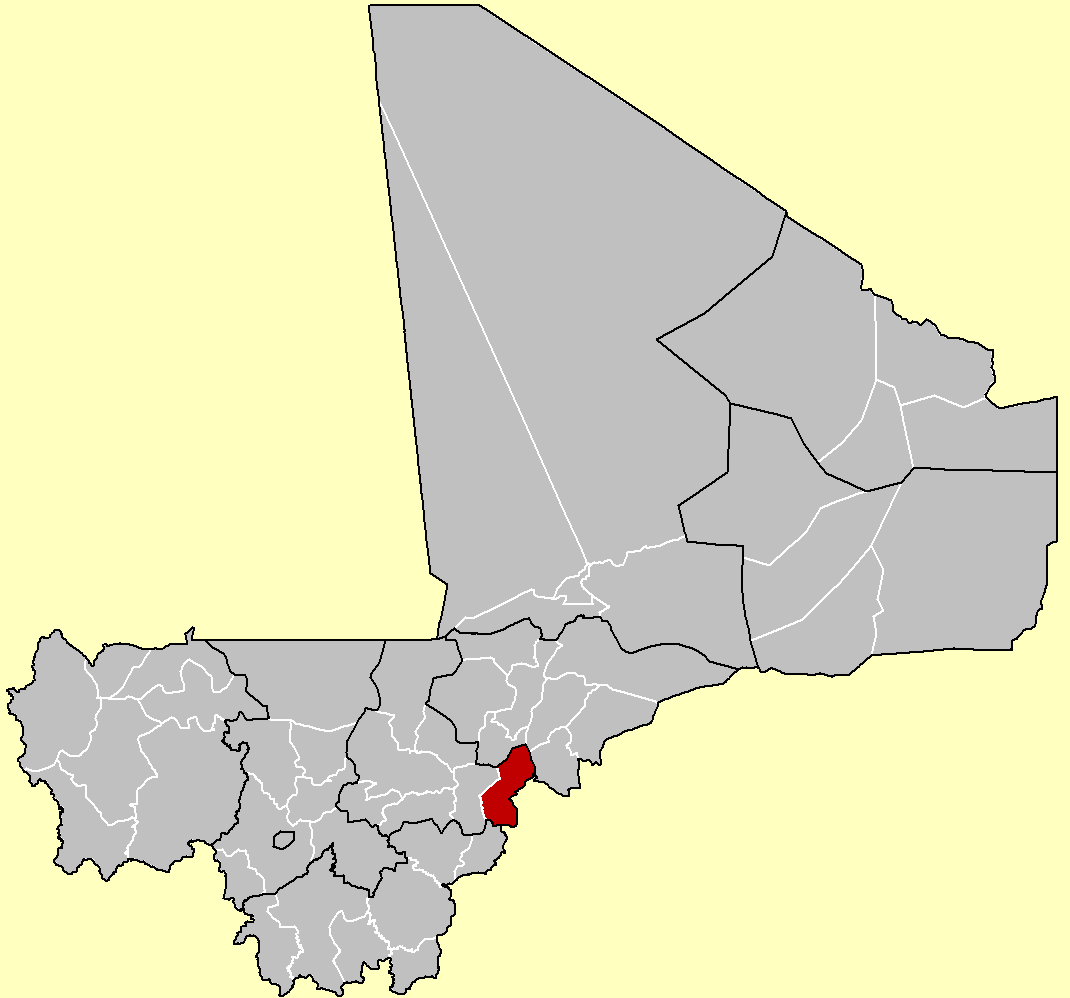
- Location of the Cercle of Tominian in Mali
- Country: Mali
- Region: Ségou Region
- Admin. HQ: Tominian

Area
  - Total: 6,573 km^{2} (2,538 sq mi)

Population (2009 Census)
  - Total: 219,853
  - Density: 33.45/km^{2} (86.63/sq mi)
- Time zone: UTC+0 (GMT)

Tominian Cercle is an administrative subdivision of the Ségou Region of Mali. The administrative center of the local government is in the town of Tominian. The Cercle is divided into Communes, and below this, quarters/villages. In the 2009 census the cercle had a population of 219,853 people.

The cercle of Tominian is divided into 11 communes:

- Benena
- Diora
- Fangasso
- Koula
- Lanfiala
- Mandiakuy
- Mafouné
- Ouan
- Sanekuy
- Timissa
- Tominian
- Yasso
