= Mandiakuy =

- Commune and town
- Location in Mali
- Coordinates: 13°1′N 4°28′W
- Country: Mali
- Region: Ségou Region
- Cercle: Tominian Cercle
- Elevation: 1,007 ft (307 m)

Population (1998)
  - Total: 15,949
- Time zone: UTC+0 (GMT)

Mandiakuy or Mandiakui is a small town and commune in the Cercle of Tominian in the Ségou Region of Mali. In 1998 the commune had a population of 15,949.
