= Benena =

- Commune and town
- Location in Mali
- Coordinates: 13°7′N 4°22′W
- Country: Mali
- Region: Ségou Region
- Cercle: Tominian Cercle

Population (1998)
  - Total: 14,748
- Time zone: UTC+0 (GMT)

Benena is a small town and commune in the Tominian Cercle in the Ségou Region of southern Mali. In 1998 the commune had a population of 14,748.
