= Koula, Ségou =

Koula
- Commune and town
- Location in Mali
- Coordinates: 13°15′N 4°16′W
- Country: Mali
- Region: Ségou Region
- Cercle: Tominian Cercle

Population (1998)
  - Total: 14,998
- Time zone: UTC+0 (GMT)

Koula is a small town and commune in the Cercle of Tominian in the Ségou Region of Mali. In 1998 the commune had a population of 14.998.
