= Tominian =

- Commune and town
- Location in Mali
- Coordinates: 13°17′N 4°35′W
- Country: Mali
- Region: Ségou Region
- Cercle: Tominian Cercle

Population (1998)
  - Total: 18,130
- Time zone: UTC+0 (GMT)

Tominian is a small town and commune and capital of the Cercle of Tominian in the Ségou Region of Mali. In 1998 the commune had a population of 18,130. In 2004, the population in the main town was recorded at 3,119 people.

As of 2004 the mayor is Bourema Diassana.

== Gallery ==
At a kind of festival in Tominian in 1972 various groups of dancers, musicians and singers performed. These were dancers with a singer representing Tominian itself:

The group for neighbouring Ké-Macina:

And finally the group representing Ségou:
