= Bankass Cercle =

Coordinates: 13°40′N 3°40′W

Bankass
- Cercle
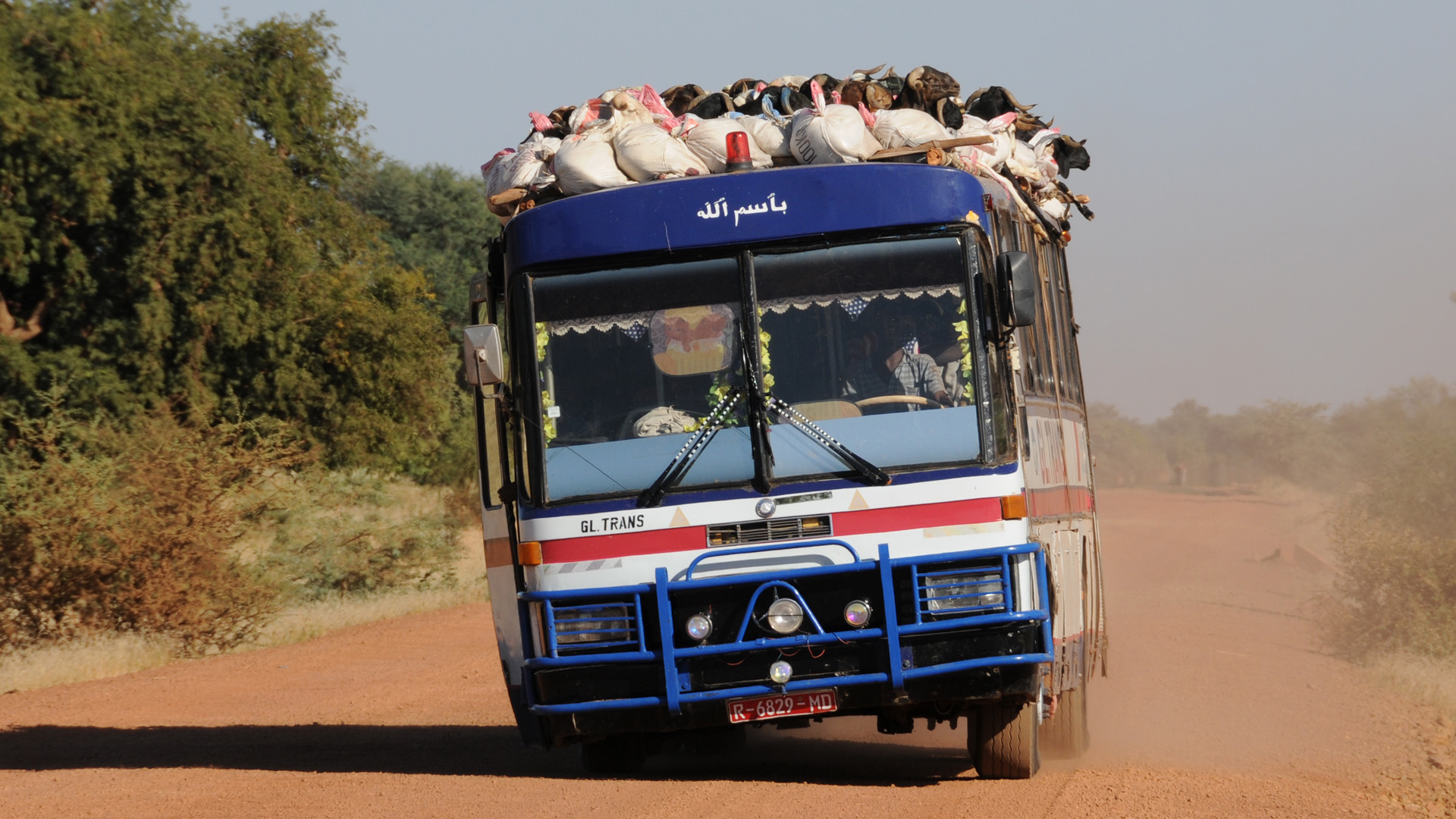

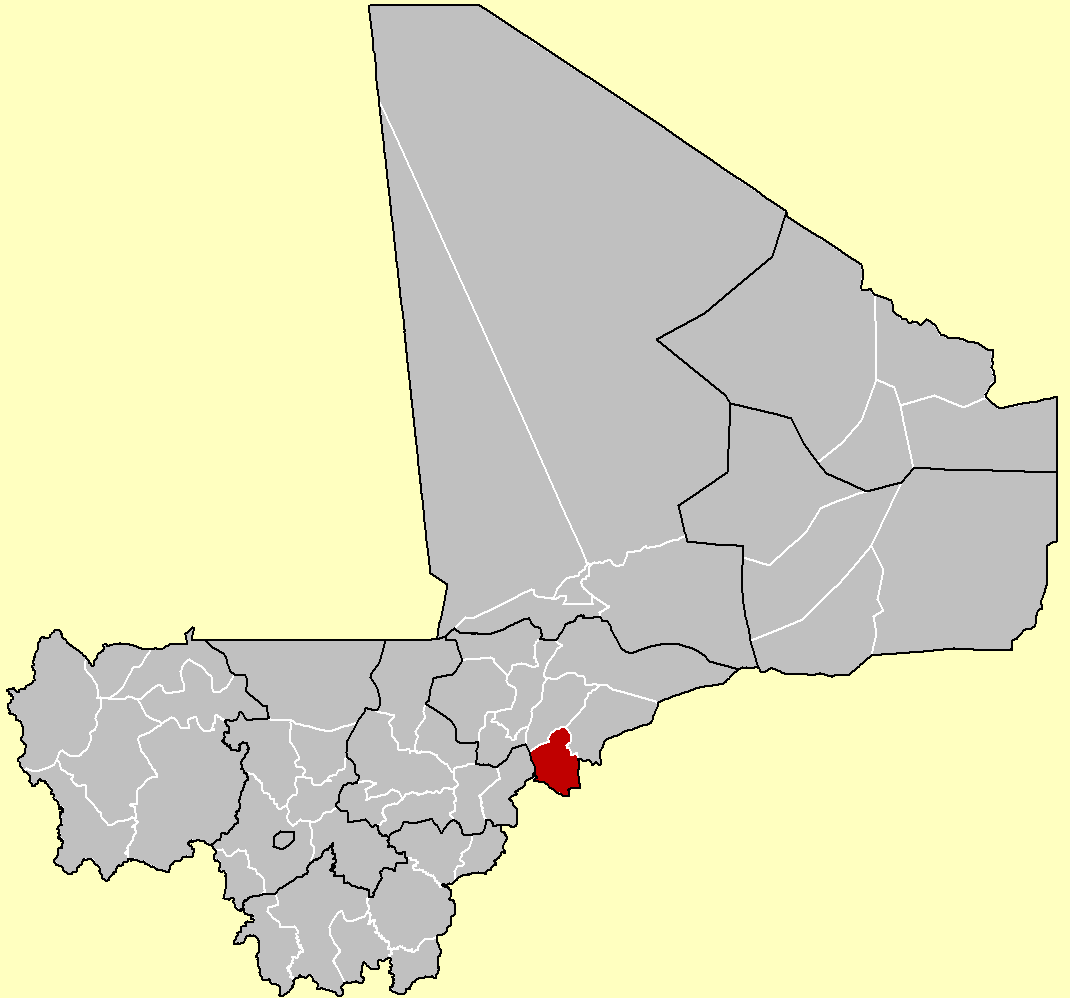
- Location of the Cercle of Bankass in Mali
- Country: Mali
- Region: Bandiagara Region
- Capital: Bankass
- Admin HQ (Chef-lieu): Bankass

Area
  - Total: 9,054 km^{2} (3,496 sq mi)

Population (2009 census)
  - Total: 263,446
  - Density: 29.10/km^{2} (75.36/sq mi)
- Time zone: UTC+0 (GMT)

Bankass Cercle is an administrative subdivision of the Bandiagara Region of Mali. The administrative center (chef-lieu) is at the town of Bankass.

The Cercle is divided into 12 rural communes:

- Bankass
- Baye
- Diallassagou
- Dimbal Habé
- Kani Bonzon
- Koulogon Habé
- Léssagou Habé
- Ouenkoro
- Ségué
- Sokoura
- Soubala
- Tori

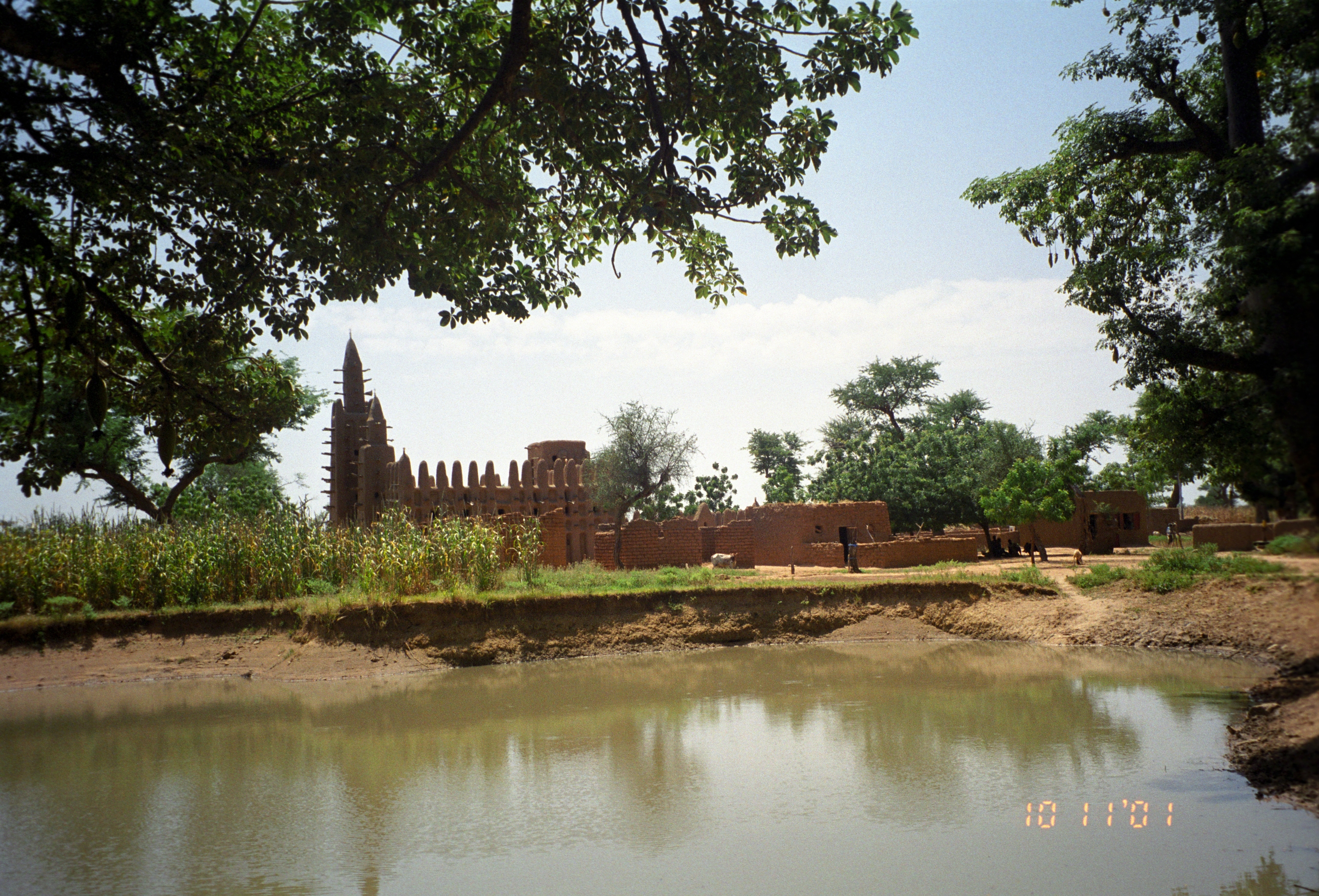
Kani-Kombole Mosque
