= Bankass =

- Commune and town
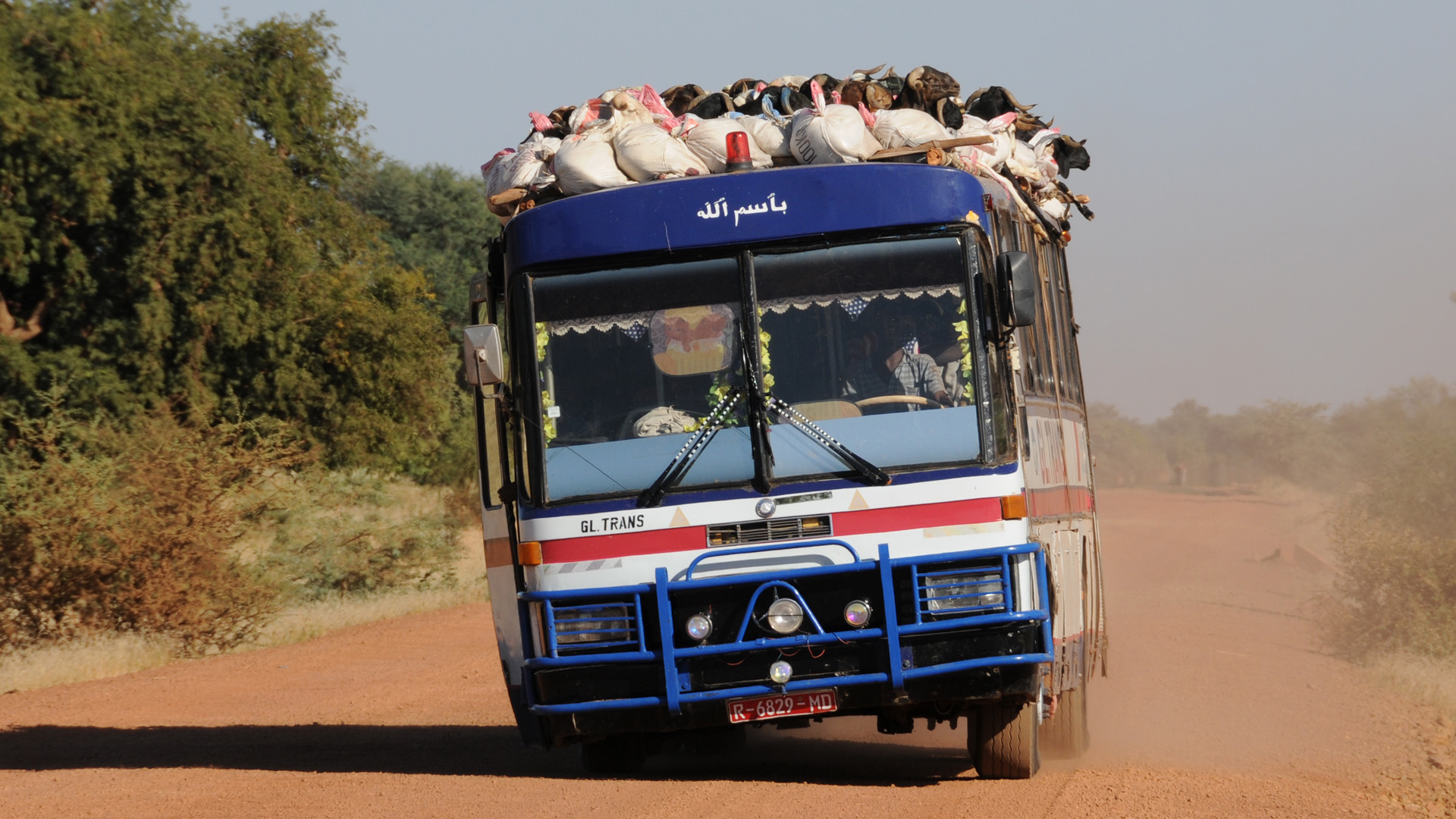

- Location in Mali
- Coordinates: 14°04′N 3°31′W
- Country: Mali
- Region: Bandiagara Region
- Cercle: Bankass Cercle

Area
  - Total: 362 km^{2} (140 sq mi)

Population (2009 census)
  - Total: 30,159
  - Density: 83.3/km^{2} (216/sq mi)
- Time zone: UTC+0 (GMT)

Bankass (Báŋkà:s) is a town and rural commune located in the Bandiagara Region of Mali. The commune has an area of approximately 362 square kilometers and includes the town and 25 of the surrounding villages. In the 2009 census it had a population of 30,159. The town is the seat of the Bankass Cercle, one of eight subdivisions (cercles) of the Mopti Region.

There is a Tuesday weekly market in the town.
