= Bandiagara Cercle =

Coordinates: 14°25′N 3°40′W

- Cercle
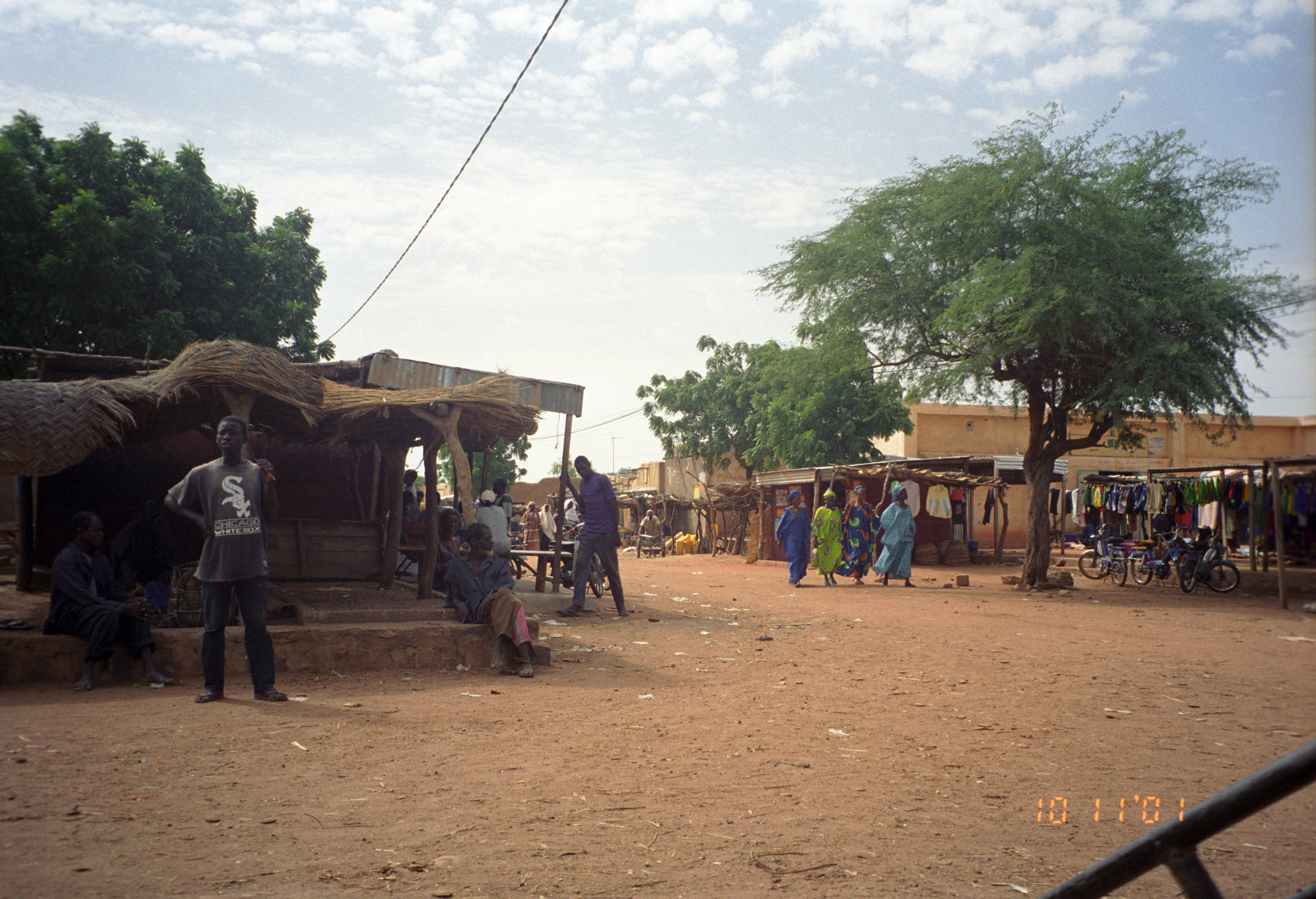

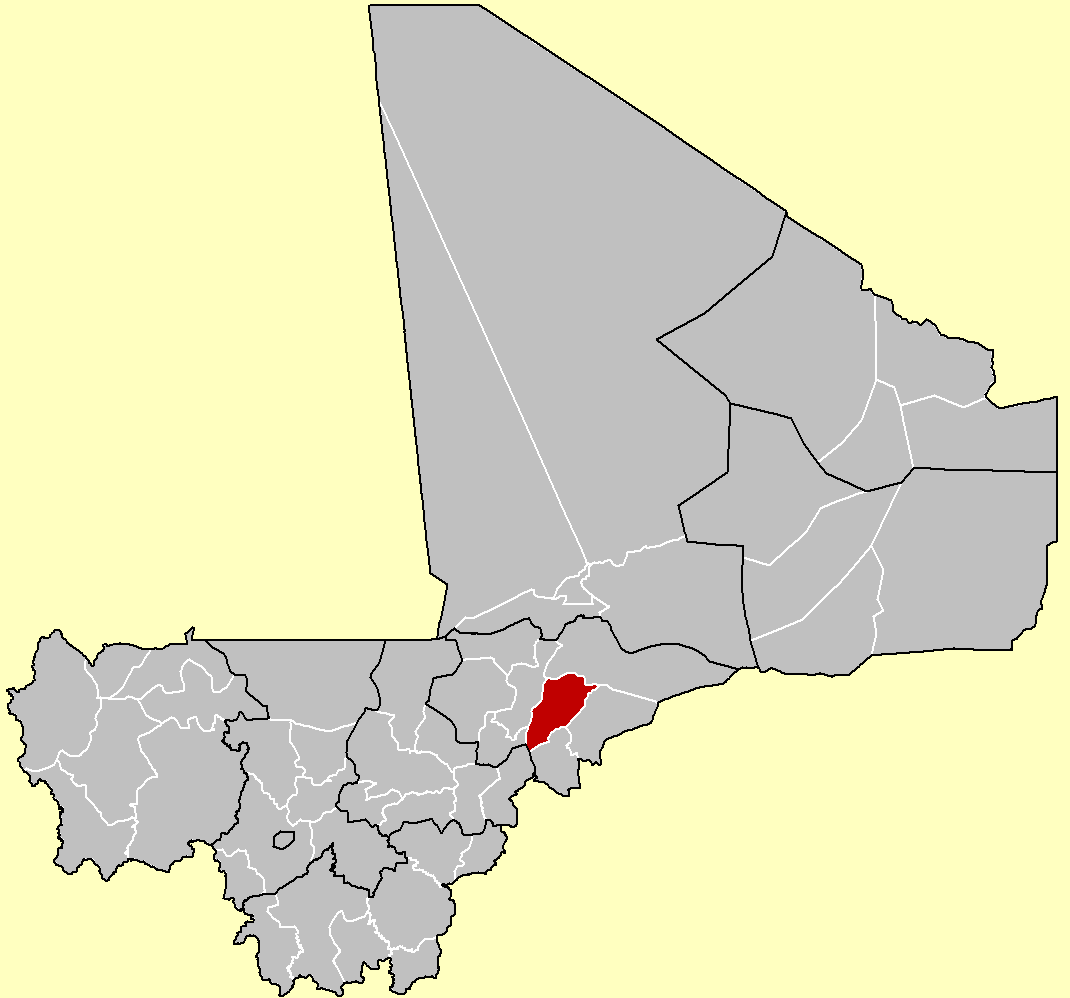
- Location of the Cercle of Bandiagara in Mali
- Country: Mali
- Region: Bandiagara Region
- Admin HQ (Chef-lieu): Bandiagara

Area
  - Total: 10,520 km^{2} (4,060 sq mi)

Population (2009 census)
  - Total: 317,965
  - Density: 30.22/km^{2} (78.28/sq mi)
- Time zone: UTC+0 (GMT)

Bandiagara Cercle is an administrative subdivision of the Bandiagara Region of Mali. The administrative center (chef-lieu) is the town of Bandiagara.

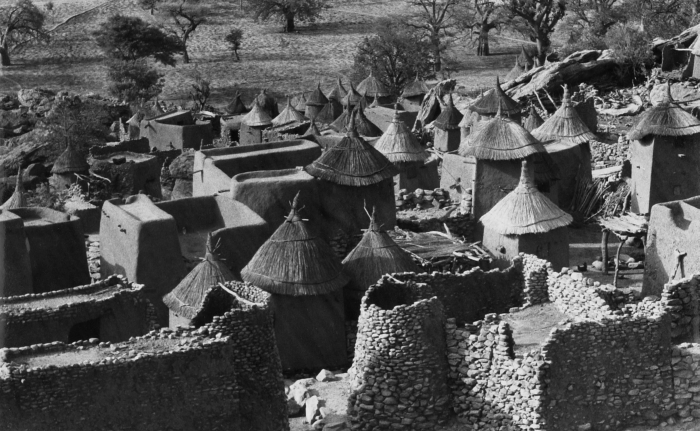
Village in Bandiagara Cercle ca. 1970

The cercle is divided into these communes:

- Bandiagara
- Bara Sara
- Borko
- Dandoli
- Diamnati
- Dogani Béré
- Doucoumbo
- Dourou
- Kendé
- Kendié
- Lougourougoumbou
- Lowol Guéou
- Métoumou
- Ondougou
- Pelou
- Pignari
- Pignari Bana
- Sangha
- Ségué-Iré
- Soroly
- Timniri
- Wadouba

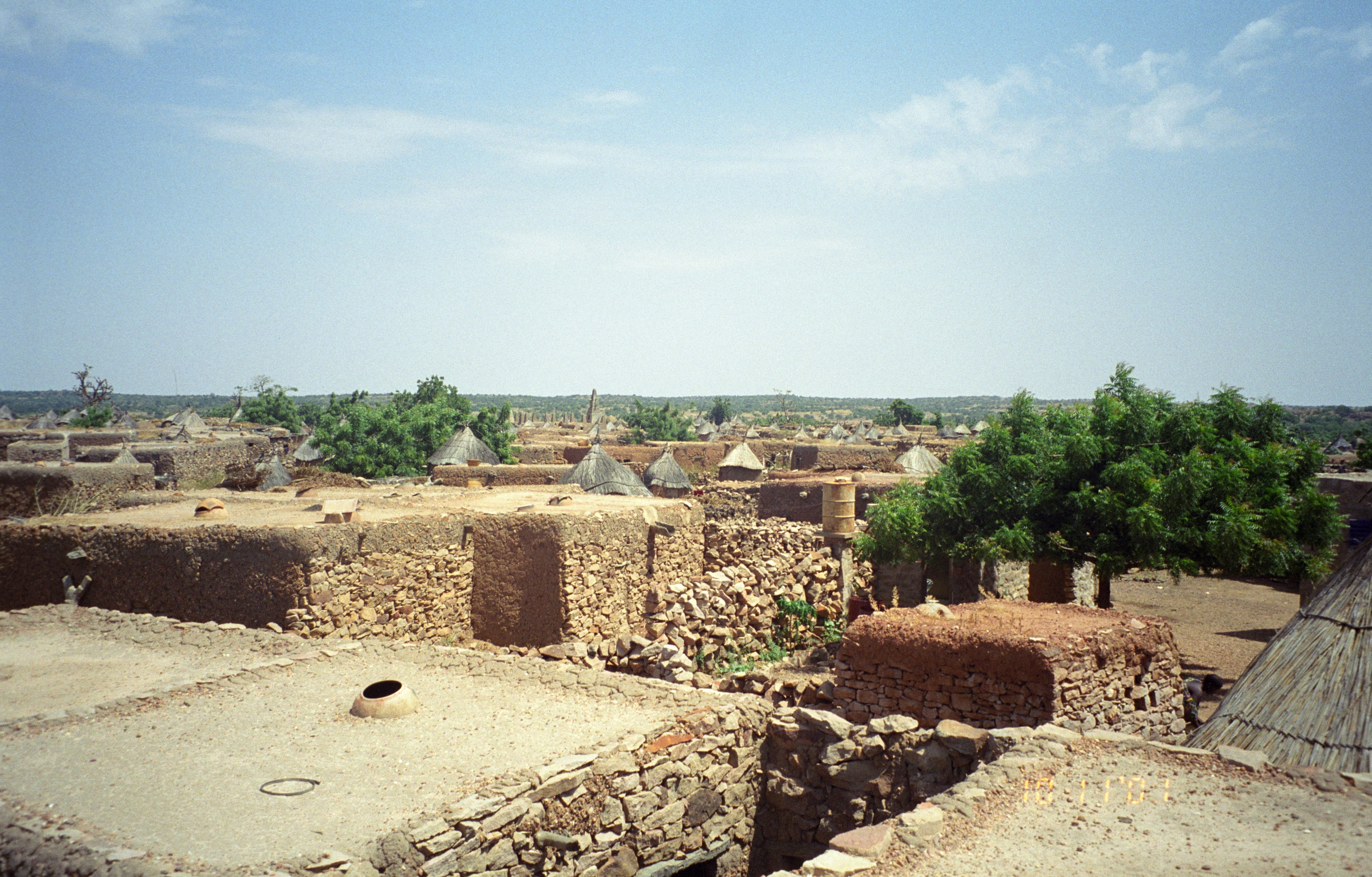
Village of Djiguibombo in the commune of Doucoumbo
