= Mopti Region =

Region of Mali

- Region
- Location within Mali
- Coordinates: 14°29′54″N 3°11′9″W
- Country: Mali
- Capital: Mopti

Area
  - Total: 26,550 km^{2} (10,250 sq mi)

Population (2023)
  - Total: 1,087,526
  - Density: 40.96/km^{2} (106.1/sq mi)
- Time zone: UTC±0 (UTC)
- HDI (2017): 0.335 low · 7th

Mopti (Fulfulde: 𞤁𞤭𞥅𞤱𞤢𞤤 𞤃𞤮𞥅𞤩𞤼𞤭𞥅, transliterated Diiwal Moobti) is the fifth administrative region of Mali, covering 26,550 km^{2}. Its capital is the city of Mopti. During the 2012 Northern Mali conflict, the frontier between Southern Mali which is controlled by the central government and the rebel-held North ran through Mopti Region.

== Geography ==
Mopti Region borders Tombouctou Region to the north; the Bandiagara and Douentza Regions to the east; San Region to the south; and the Ségou Region to the west.

The population in the 2009 census was 2,037,330. The region contains a number of ethnic groups including Fulani, Malinke, and Bambara.

The Niger River crosses the region and is joined by the Bani, an important tributary, at the city of Mopti.

The region is separated into several areas: the Inland Niger Delta around Mopti, the Bandiagara cliffs and the plain of Bankass along the Burkina Faso frontier. Mount Hombori, the highest point in Mali at 1153 meters, is in the Mopti Region, near the city of the same name.

In terms of its climate, Mopti Region is considered part of the Sahel.

The largest towns of the region are Mopti, Sévaré (which lies within Mopti Commune), Djenné, and Youwarou.

== Transportation and economy ==
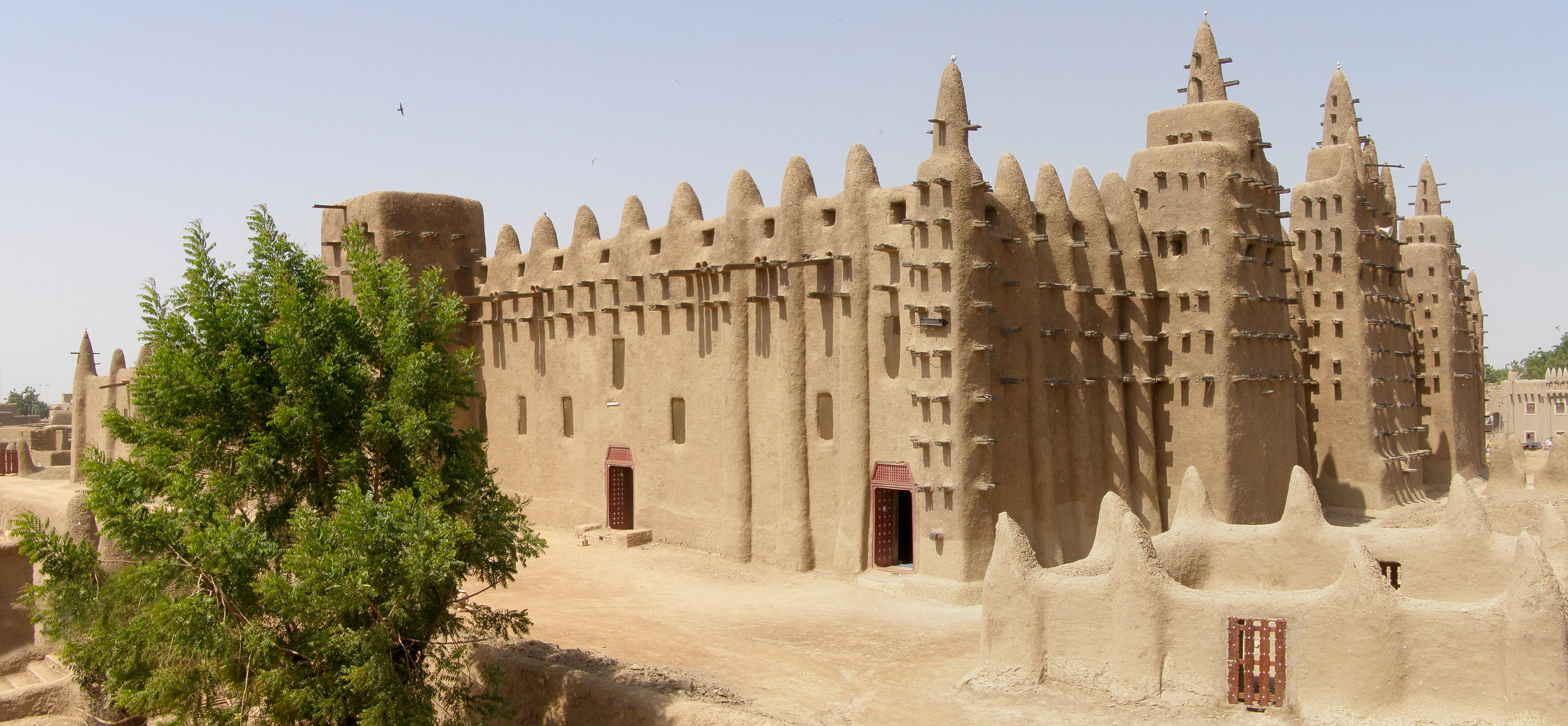
The Great Mosque of Djenné, an example of Sudano-Sahelian architecture

An airport at Mopti provides air service for the region, while the Niger River provides transportation to Koulikoro and Ségou to the west and Tombouctou and Gao to the east.

The region is well-irrigated and its agriculture is well-developed, with particularly successful fishing. Mopti serves as an important commercial crossroads between Mali's north, south and bordering nations. Tourism is also well-developed, notably in the cities of Djenné and Mopti (the former of which boasts the Great Mosque of Djenné, the largest mud structure in the world) and in Dogon country.

== History ==
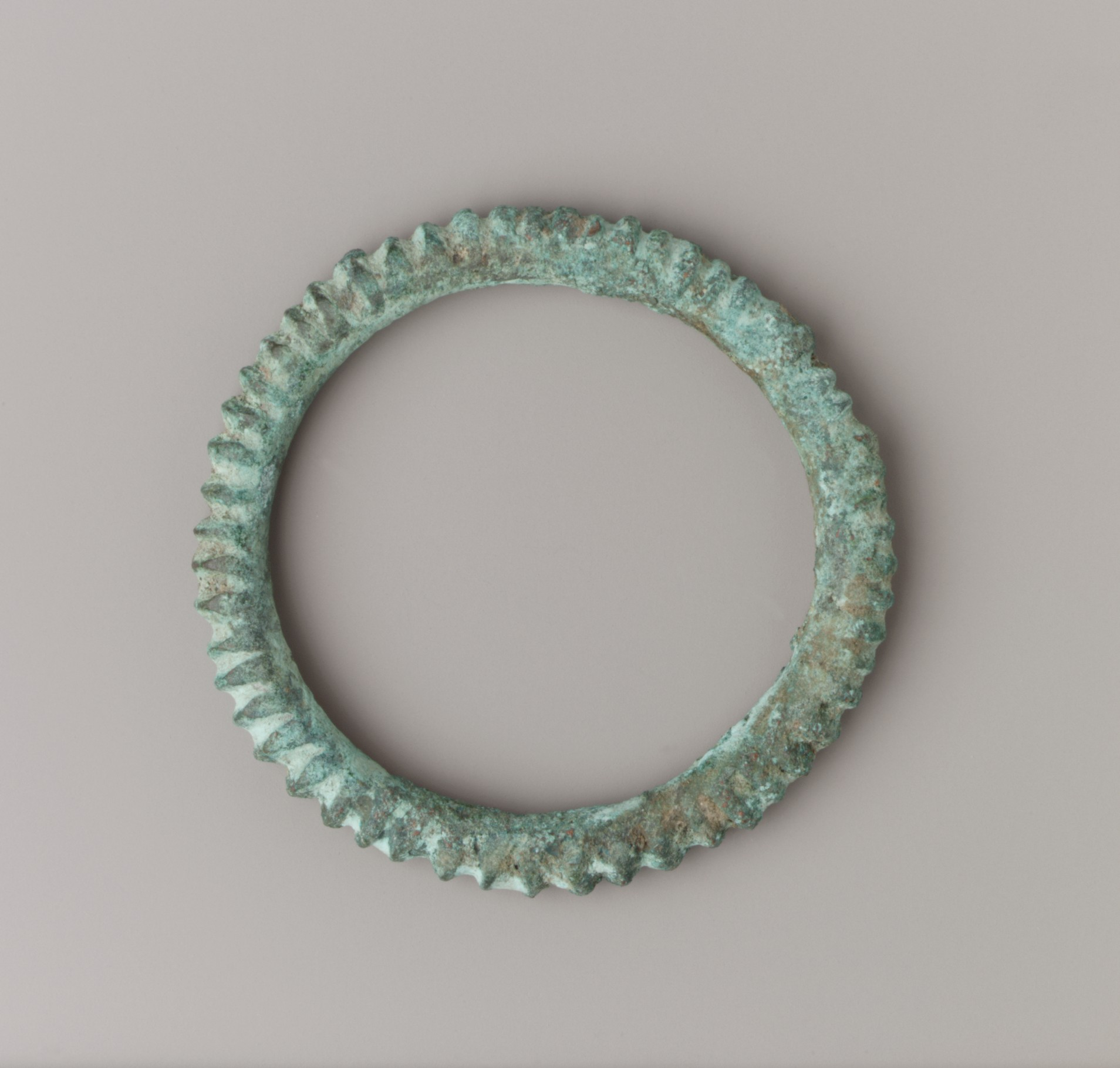
A copper-alloy bracelet from Djenné, dating between the 11th-16th centuries

Though Mopti's location, once a Bozo village named Sanga, had long been inhabited, rapid expansion began under Seku Amadu's Massina Empire around 1820. Expansion continued under the Toucouleur Empire of El Hadj Umar Tall as well as the French colonial administration.

== Culture ==
The region is a melting pot, made up of various ethnic groups, which live in harmony with one another. Common languages of the area include Fulani, Dogon, Songhai, Bozo, Bambara and Tamashek.

=== World Heritage Sites ===
The city of Djenné in the region has been named a World Heritage Site by UNESCO since 1988, being one of four such sites in Mali. In 2009, Mali placed several prominent regional sites on its UNESCO tentative list for future World Heritage nomination, including the Komoguel Mosque of Mopti and the Hamdullahi Historic City. The Bandiagara Escarpment has also been inscribed as a UNESCO World Heritage site since 1989 but now lies in the neighboring Bandiagara Region.

== Administrative subdivisions ==
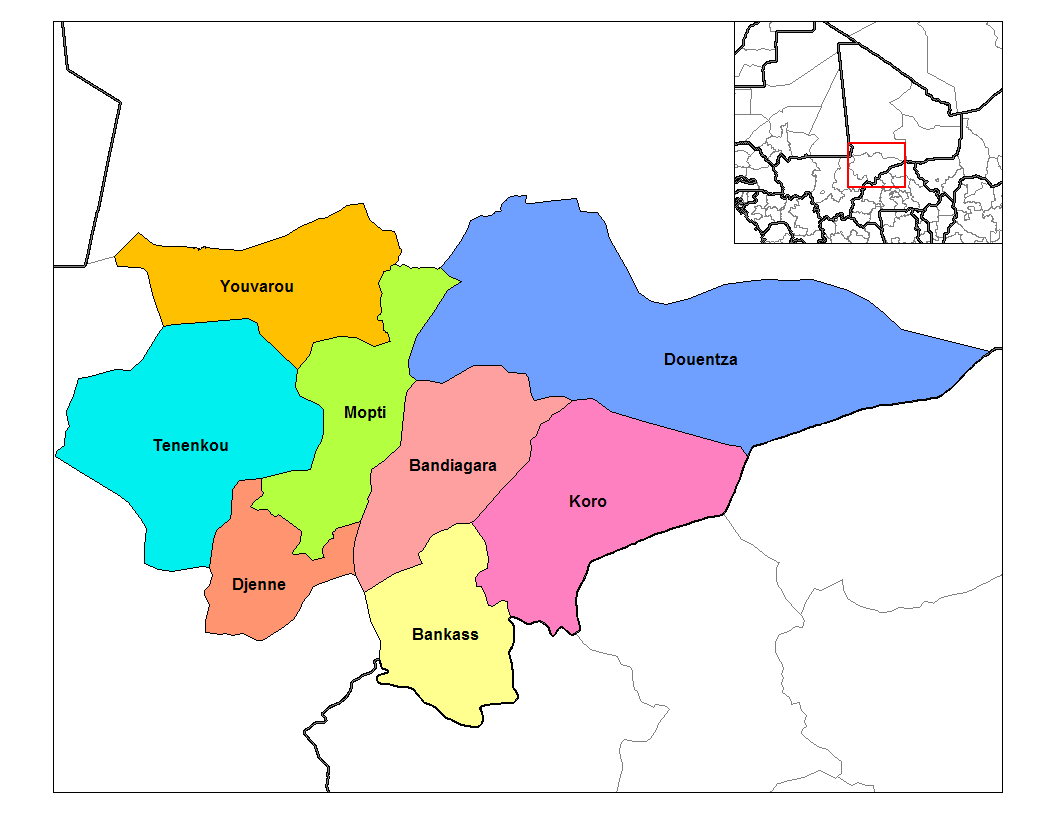
Cercles of the Mopti Region prior to the formation of the Douentza Region and Bandiagara Region.

Mopti is divided into 8 Cercles encompassing 108 communes:

Cercle name	Area (km^{2})	Population Census 1998	Population Census 2009
Bandiagara	10,520	237,139	317,965
Bankass	9,054	195,582	263,446
Djenné	4,563	155,551	207,260
Douentza	23,481	155,831	247,794
Koro	10,937	267,579	361,944
Mopti	7,262	263,719	368,512
Ténenkou	11,297	127,237	163,641
Youwarou	7,139	81,963	106,768

There are more than 1,000 villages in Mopti Region occupied by ethnic Dogon, Songhay, Fula, and other peoples.

== Demographics ==
The Mopti Region is the eighth most populated region in Mali, with a population of 935,579 in 2022. With a total fertility rate at 5.1 births per woman, Mopti has a lower TFR than the Malian national average of 6.1 births per woman.

=== Ethnicity ===
Ethnicity in Mopti (2022)
1. Fula (28.3%)
2. Bambara (20.0%)
3. Bozo (18.2%)
4. Songhai (9.27%)
5. Dogon (7.81%)
6. Soninke (4.02%)
7. Tuareg (3.65%)
8. Malinké (2.40%)
9. Mossi (1.07%)
10. Other (5.31%)

Mother tongues in Mopti region (2022 census)
1. Fula (29.08%)
2. Bambara (27.10%)
3. Bozo (18.71%)
4. Songhai (9.09%)
5. Dogon (6.54%)
6. Tuareg (3.31%)
7. Maraka / Soninké (1.38%)
8. Malinke (1.32%)
9. Mossi (1.26%)
10. Other Malian (2.09%)
11. Other African (0.08%)
12. Other foreign (0.04%)

In 2022, the Fula, Bambara, and Bozo represented the three largest ethnic groups in the region. Mopti has the highest concentration of Fula and Bozo people in Mali. Minorities in Mopti include the Songhai, Dogon, Soninke, Tuareg, Mandinka, and Mossi.

=== Religion ===
The 2022 census found that 99.10% of the population in Mopti was Muslim, 0.84% was Christian, 0.01% were adherents of traditional faiths, 0.01% practiced other religions, and 0.04% had no religion.

== See also ==
- Dogon country
- Regions of Mali
- Cercles of Mali
