= Djenné =

Town in Mopti Region, Mali

Djenné Jɛ̀nɛ́ (Bambara) Jenne (Djenné Chiini Songhay)
- Commune and town

Names transcription(s)
  - Bambara: ߖߍ߬ߣߍ߫
  - Djenné Chiini: جٜنّٜ
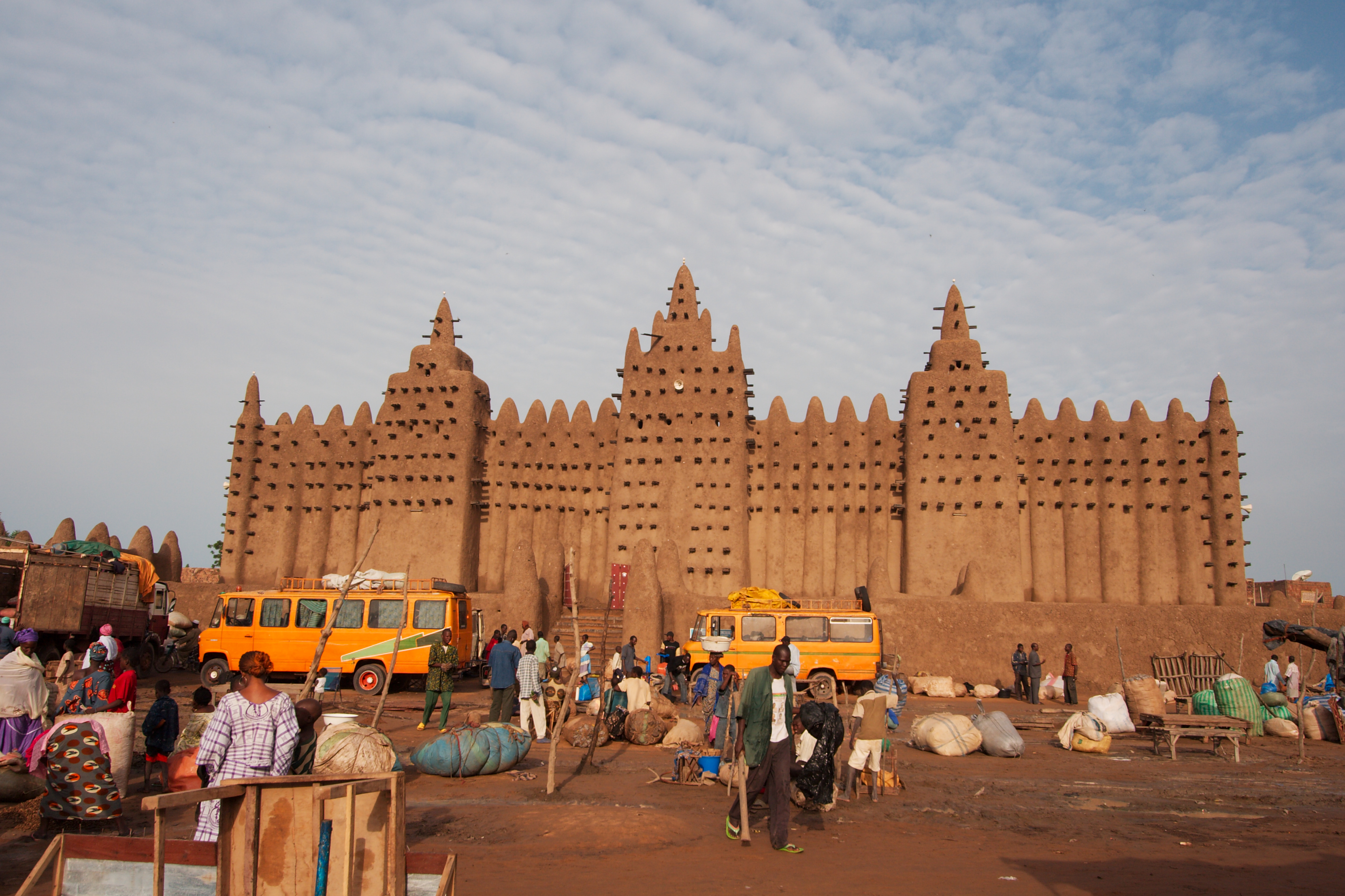
- Street market and Great Mosque of Djenné
- Nickname: Town of 313 Saints (Ville aux 313 saints)
- Location within Mali
- Coordinates: 13°54′20″N 4°33′18″W
- Country: Mali
- Region: Mopti Region
- Cercle: Djenné Cercle

Area
  - Total: 485 ha (1,200 acres)
- Elevation: 278 m (912 ft)

Population (2009)
  - Total: 32,944
  - Density: 6,790/km^{2} (17,600/sq mi)

Djenné (Bambara: ߖߍ߬ߣߍ߫, romanized: Jɛ̀nɛ́; also known as Djénné, Jenné, and Jenne) is a town and urban commune in the Inland Niger Delta region of central Mali. The town is the administrative centre of the Djenné Cercle, one of the eight subdivisions of the Mopti Region. The commune includes ten of the surrounding villages and in 2009 had a population of 32,944.

The history of Djenné is closely linked with that of Timbuktu. Between the 15th and 17th centuries much of the trans-Saharan trade in goods such as salt, gold, and slaves that moved in and out of Timbuktu passed through Djenné. Both towns became centres of Islamic scholarship. Djenné's prosperity depended on this trade and when the Portuguese established trading posts on the African coast, the importance of the trans-Saharan trade and thus of Djenné declined.

The town is famous for its distinctive adobe architecture, most notably the Great Mosque which was built in 1907 on the site of an earlier mosque. To the south of the town is Djenné-Djenno, the site of one of the oldest known towns in sub-Saharan Africa. It is one of the oldest cities in Mali and West Africa as well as oldest continuously inhabited cities in the World. Djenné together with Djenné-Djenno were designated a World Heritage Site by UNESCO in 1988.

== Geography ==
Djenné is situated 398 km (247 mi) northeast of Bamako and 76 km (47 mi) southwest of Mopti. The town sits on the floodplain between the Niger and Bani rivers at the southern end of the Inland Niger Delta. The town has an area of around 70 ha (170 acres) and during the annual floods becomes an island that is accessed by causeways. The Bani river is 5 km (3.1 mi) south of the town and is crossed by ferry.

For administrative purposes the town forms part of the commune of Djenné which covers an area of 302 square kilometers and consists of the town and ten of the surrounding villages: Ballé, Diabolo, Gomnikouboye, Kamaraga, Kéra, Niala, Soala, Syn, Velingara and Yenleda. The population figures are for the commune and include these villages. The commune is bounded to the north by the communes of Ouro Ali and Derary, to the south by the commune of Dandougou Fakala, to the east by the communes of Fakala and Madiama and to the west by the commune of Pondori. The town is the administrative center (chef-lieu) of the Djenné Cercle, one of eight administrative subdivisions of the Mopti Region.

=== Climate ===
The weather is hot and dry throughout much of the year. Average daily maximum temperatures in the hottest months, April and May, are around 40 °C. Temperatures are slightly cooler, though still very hot, from June through September, when practically all of the annual rainfall occurs. Only the winter months of December and January have average daily maximum temperatures below 32 °C. Between December and March the warm dry north-easterly Harmattan wind blows from the Sahara. When it blows strongly, the dust-laden wind reduces visibility and creates a persistent haze. The annual rainfall is around 550 mm but varies greatly from year to year. August is normally the wettest month.

=== Annual flood ===
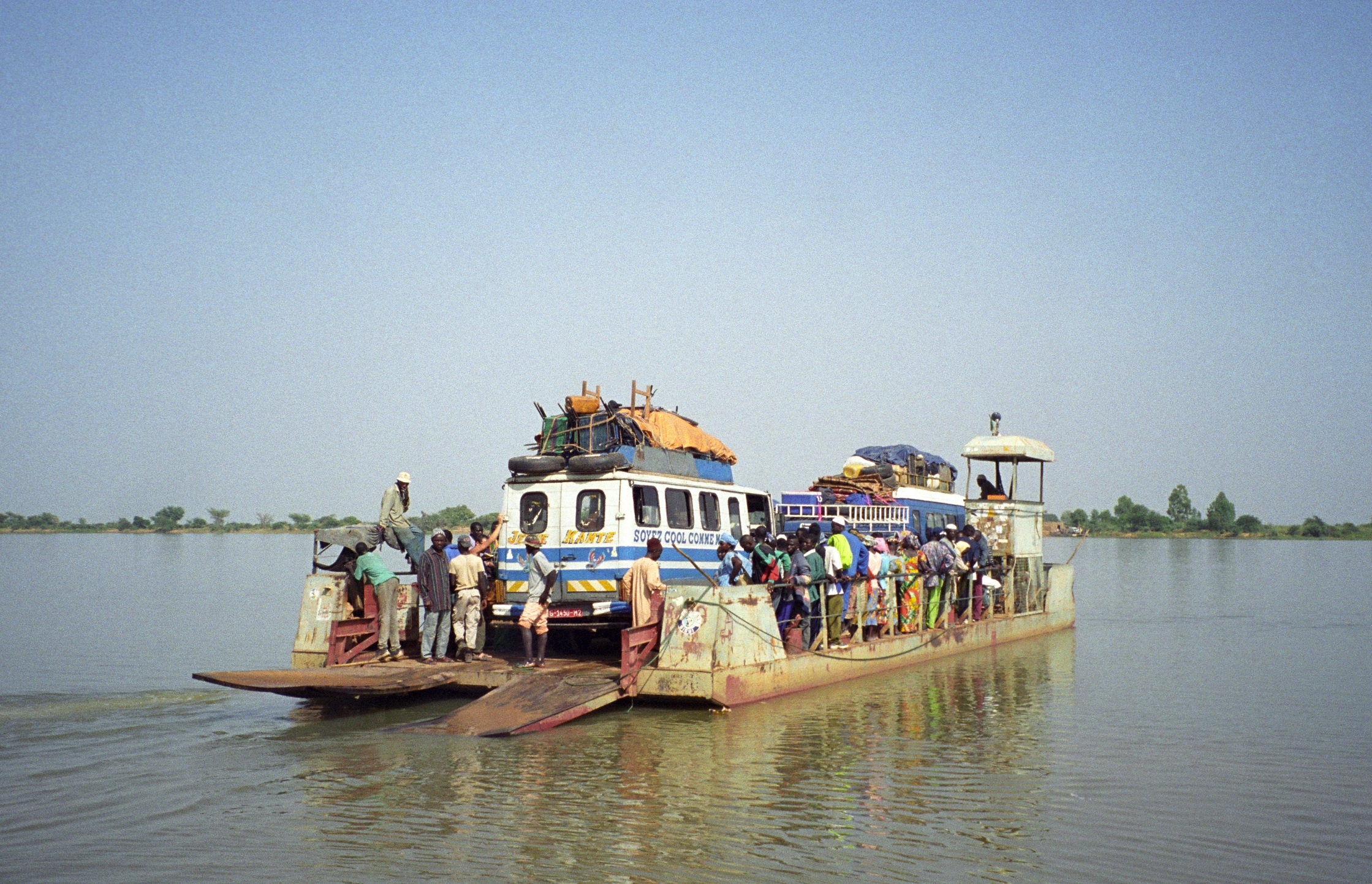
Passenger vehicles on the Bani River ferry near Djenné.

In Djenné the annual flood produced by Bani and Niger rivers begins in July and reaches a maximum in October. During this period, the town of Djenné becomes an island and the Souman-Bani channel that passes just to the east of the town fills and connects the Bani and Niger rivers. The year-to-year variation in the height of the flood leads to a large variation in the area of land that is flooded. This has important consequences for the local agriculture. The drought that began in the early 1970s resulted in a big reduction in the volume of water flowing in the Niger and Bani rivers. The effect on the Bani was particularly severe as the reduction in flow was much greater than the reduction in rainfall. The annual discharge of the river has not returned to the volumes experienced in the 1950s and 1960s. It is only during the flood season (mid-July till December) that the Bani river between Djenné and Mopti is easily navigable. At other times of the year, sandbars lie close to the water surface. When the French explorer René Caillié made the journey to Mopti in a small boat in March 1828, he was "obliged several times to unload the vessel in order to pass over sandbanks."

=== Talo dam ===
In 2006 the Talo Dam was constructed on the Bani River to irrigate parts of the floodplain near the town of San. The dam is located 43 km west of San and 110 km upstream from Djenné. (Note: The Talo dam is located at 13.2774°N 5.2929°W.) The dam functions as a weir in that water can flow over the top of the retaining wall. The construction of the dam was highly controversial. The environmental impact assessment commissioned by the African Development Bank was criticised for not fully taking into account the hydrological impact downstream of the dam. The 0.18 km^{3} of water retained by the dam represents 1.3% of the average annual discharge of the river (the average for the period 1952–2002 is 13.4 km^{3}). From the published information it is unclear how much of the total discharge will be diverted for irrigation and, of the diverted water, how much will drain back into the river. The downstream effect of the dam will be to delay the arrival of the annual flood and to reduce its intensity.

=== Djenné dam ===
In May 2009 the African Development Bank approved funding for an irrigation dam/weir to be built on the Bani near Soala, a village within the commune situated 12 km (7.5 mi) south of Djenné. (Note: The village of Saola is located on the left back of the Bani at 13.79824°N 4.531775°W) The dam is one element in a 6-year 33.6 billion CFA franc (66 million USD) program that also includes the building of a dam on the Sankarani River near Kourouba and the extension of the area irrigated by the Talo dam. The proposed Djenné dam will retain 0.3 km^{3} of water, significantly more than the Talo dam. It will allow the "controlled flooding" of 14,000 ha (35,000 acres) of the Pondori floodplain (on the left bank of the river to the south of Djenné) to allow the cultivation of rice and the irrigation of an additional 5,000 ha (12,000 acres) for growing 'floating grass' (Echinochloa stagnina known locally as bourgou) for animal feed.

== History ==
=== Djenné-Jeno ===
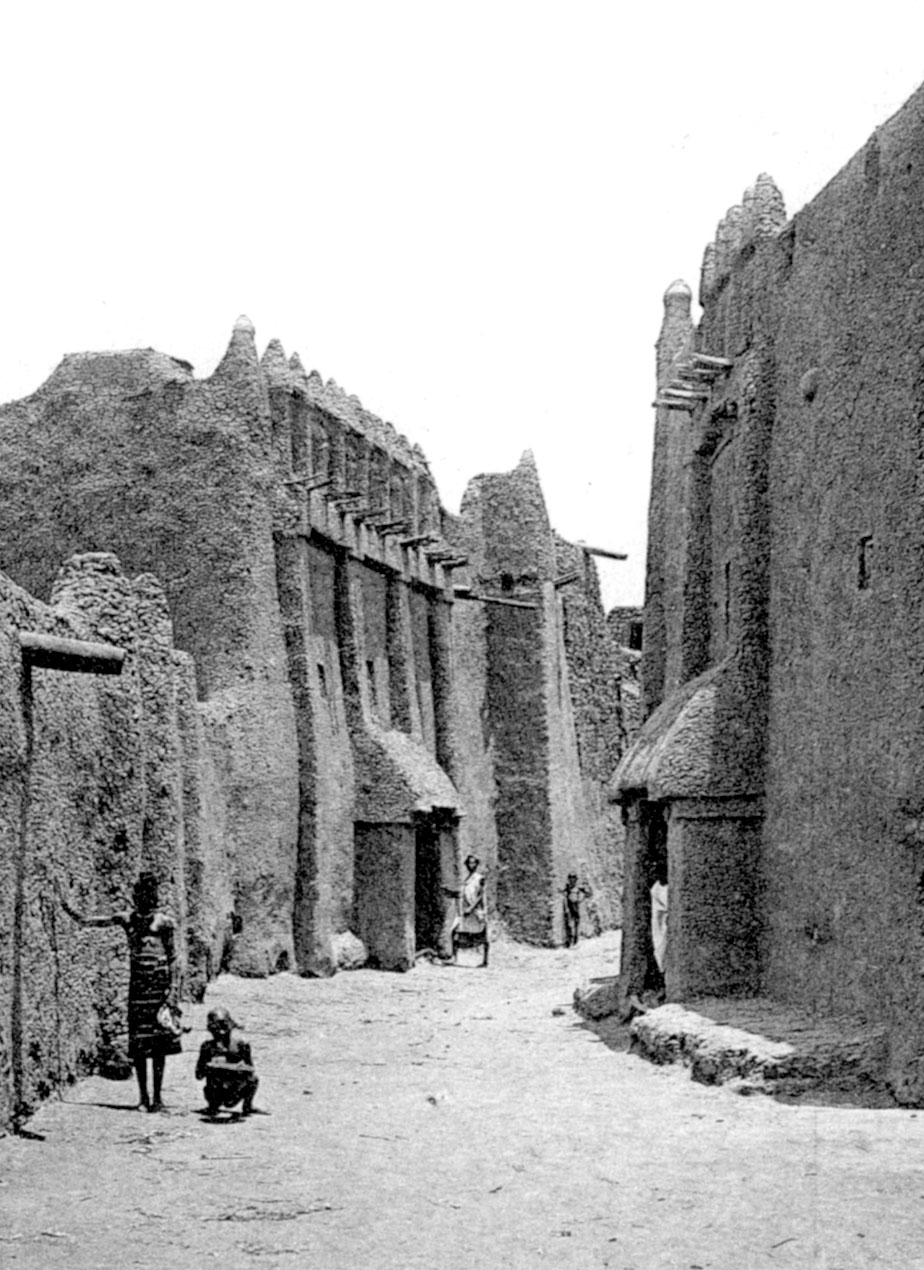
Houses in Djenné with Toucouleur-style façades from a postcard by Edmond Fortier published in 1906.

Lying 2.5 km (1.6 mi) south-east of the present town is the archaeological site of Djenné-Djeno, meaning 'old Djenne', one of the earliest and most important urban sites in West Africa. The name of the town itself was Djoboro, and it was founded by Soninke immigrants from the Wagadou region during an increasingly dry period that made the Inner Niger Delta more habitable. Excavations undertaken by Susan and Roderick McIntosh in 1977 and 1981 indicate that Djenné-Jéno was first settled around 200 BC. Oral traditions recount a legendary founder named Maafir, who was from Yemen and descended from the Biblical and Quranic figure Esau. Djoboro developed into a large walled urban complex by between 300 and 850 AD. It estimated city and its environs, including the later site of modern-day Djenne, had approximately from 10,000 to 26,000 inhabitants in 800 CE. 25 chiefs ruled the city before the coming of Islam in the late 600s, although Siigha, the first Muslim ruler, is also presumably mythical, considering his supposed connections to companions of the prophet Muhammad.

Preliminary archaeological excavations at sites within modern Djenné indicate that the present town was first settled after 1000 AD. Oral traditions, failing to distinguish between Djenne and Djoboro, claim that it was founded in 635 around the home of a powerful djinn, Shamharoush, who had been blessed by the prophet Muhammad. The name 'Djenne' derives from jannah, the Islamic paradise.

After 1100 AD the population of Djenne-Djeno declined and by 1400 AD the site had been abandoned. Many smaller settlements within a few kilometres of Djenné-Jéno also appear to have been abandoned around this date. The cause of this demographic collapse is unknown, but may have included new diseases arriving in the area through trans-Saharan trade, or warfare. Djenne, however, was fully occupied, and survived as a center of regional trade.

=== Mali Empire ===
Djenne had a complicated relationship with the Mali Empire, which rose to power in the 13th century. Seventeenth century indigenous chronicles give conflicting accounts of the status of the town. Al-Sadi in his Tarikh al-Sudan claims that the Malians attacked the town ninety-nine times but that Djenné was never conquered while the other major chronicle, the Tarikh al-fattash, describes the chief of Djenné as a humble vassal of the Malian emperor. Djenné was probably a tribute-paying sometimes-vassal, with recurring episodes of conflict and commercial coercion pitting the city-state's military and economic prowess against the powerful Malian state, which controlled most of the trade routes in the area.

The first direct mention of Djenné in European sources is in connection with the trans-Saharan trade in gold, salt and slaves. In a letter written in Latin in 1447 by Antonio Malfante from the Saharan oasis of Tuwat to a merchant in Genoa, Malfante reports on what he had learnt from an informant about the trans-Saharan trade. He lists several 'states' including one called 'Geni' and describes the Niger River "Through these lands flows a very large river, which at certain times of the year inundates all these lands. This river passes by the gates of Thambet [Timbuktu]. ... There are many boats on it, by which they carry on trade."

=== Songhai Empire ===
In the fifteenth century the Portuguese established trading-posts along the Atlantic coast of West Africa in an attempt to tap into the overland trade in gold bullion. It is from Portuguese sources that we learn a little more about the town. With the Mali Empire in retreat, Djenne may have fought a war against the rising Songhai Empire under Sonni Sulayman Dama, a conflict whose echoes were reported by Diogo Gomes on the Gambia River. In 1471, Djenne was conquered by Sonni Ali soon after his seizure of Timbuktu. The siege lasted approximately 6 months. The flooding of the Bani protected the city, but also allowed Ali to bring his powerful river fleet to bear, blockading the city until. The sultan died during the siege, and his young son made peace with the Songhai and his mother married Sonni Ali, establishing the city's high political position within the empire. Djenne did not support Askia Muhammad I when he rebelled against Sonni Ali's successor Sonni Baru, but quickly acquiesced to his seizure of power.

Under the Songhai, Djenne functioned as one of the key hubs in a thriving trade economy centered on the middle Niger river valley, with a population of approximately 40,000 people. Duarte Pacheco Pereira, a sea-captain and explorer, mentions Djenné in his Esmeraldo de situ orbis which he wrote between 1506 and 1508: "...the city of Jany, inhabited by Negroes and surrounded by a stone wall, where there is great wealth of gold; tin and copper are greatly prized there, likewise red and blue cloths and salt ..." The Portuguese historian João de Barros, writing in the 1520s, mentions Djenné and the export of gold from the island of Arguin off the coast of present-day Mauritania: "Genná ... which in former times was more famous than Timbuktu ... As it is further to the west than Timbuktu, it is usually frequented by peoples of its neighbourhood, such as the Çaragoles [Sarakolle i.e. Sonike], Fullos [Fulani], Jalofos [Wolof], Azanegues Ṣanhāja, Brabixijs Barābīsh, Tigurarijs [people of Gurāra], and Luddayas [Ūdāya], from whom, through the Castle of Arguim and all that coast, gold came into our hands."

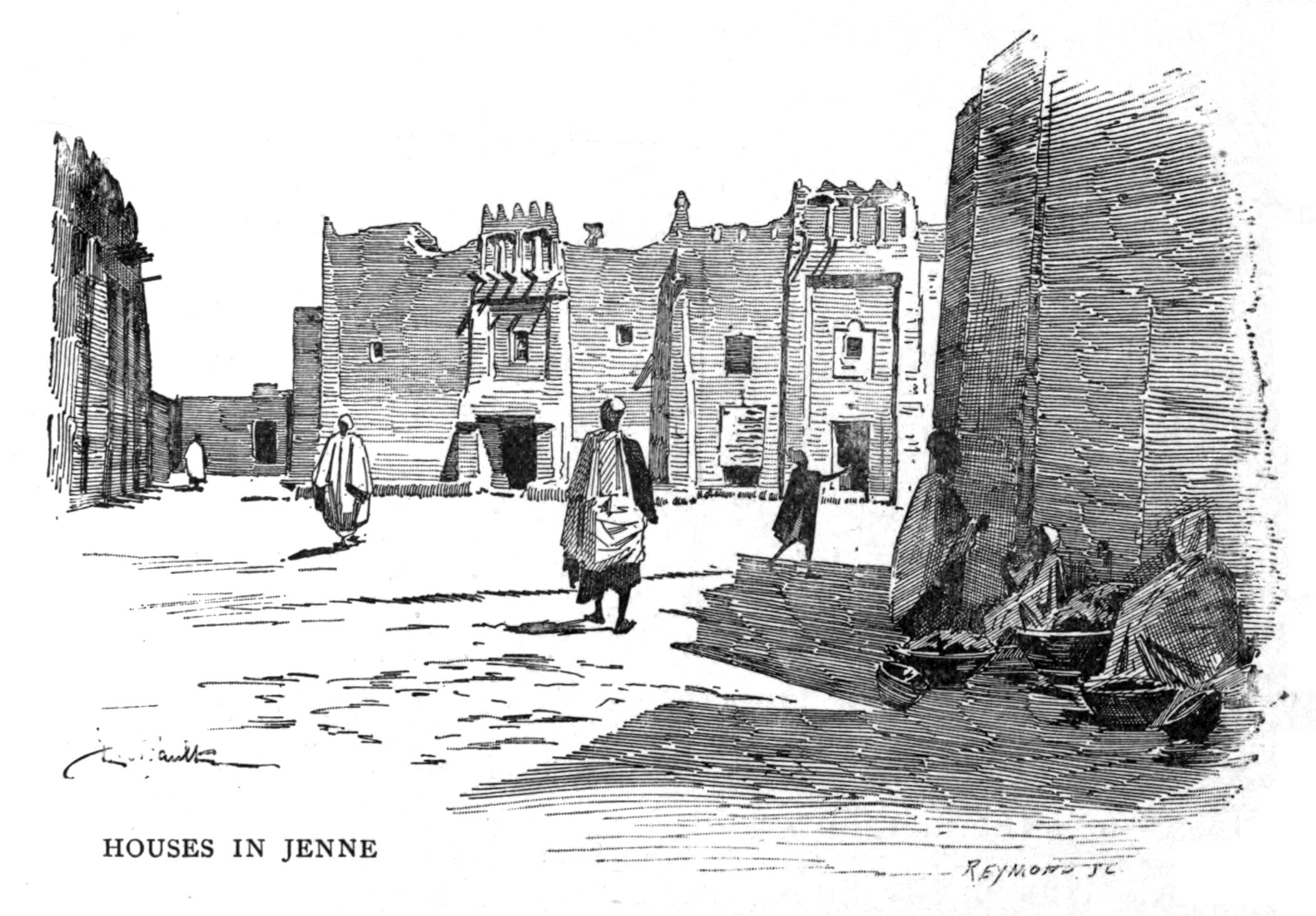
A street scene in Djenné from Timbuctoo: the Mysterious by Félix Dubois published in 1896.

Salt was mined at Taghaza in the Sahara and transported south via Timbuktu and Djenné. Gold from the Akan goldfields in the forested area between the Komoé and Volta rivers was traded at the town of Begho (Bitu) and then transported north through Djenné and Timbuktu and across the Sahara to North Africa where it was exchanged for merchandise such as cloth, copper and brass. However, by the early sixteenth century, the Portuguese had established trading posts along the African coast and were shipping large quantities of gold from Elmina in present-day Ghana. This maritime trade competed with the trans-Saharan gold trade.

Between the 14th and 17th centuries Djenné and Timbuktu were also important centers of Islamic study, in addition to their roles as entrepôts. Under Songhai administration, the city was led by the Jenne-koi or king, but also had a Jenne-mondio who answered to the Askias and was in charge of collecting taxes and customs duties.

The town is mentioned by Leo Africanus in his Descrittione dell’Africa which was completed in 1526 but not published until 1550. He had visited Mali with an uncle in around 1510 and perhaps again 3 years later. At several places in his book Leo Africanus describes the Niger River as flowing westwards from Timbuktu to Djenné. This has led some scholars to suggest that his account of Djenné was unlikely to be based on first hand observations and was probably based on information obtained from other travellers. He describes Djenné (which he refers to as Gheneo, Genni and Ghinea) (Note: Leo Africanus uses the word 'Ghinea' for both a village and a large kingdom. The historian Pekka Masonen has suggested that Leo may be confusing the town of Djenné with the ancient Ghana Empire which collapsed in the 13th century. He also suggests that João de Barros may have been similarly confused when he wrote that "Genná ... which in former times was more famous than Timbuktu." Early European sources normally used Ghinea (or Guinea) for the West African coast south of the Senegal River. The word may be derived from the Berber word for 'black'.) as a village with houses constructed of clay with straw roofs. He mentions an abundance of barley, rice, livestock, fish and cotton and also the importance of trade with north Africa in which merchants exported cotton and imported European cloth, copper, brass, and arms. In the trade with Timbuktu merchants visited during the annual flood using small narrow canoes. Unstamped gold was used for coinage.

=== After the Songhai ===
The Moroccan sultan, Ahmad al-Mansur, wanted to control the export of gold and in 1590 sent an army of 4,000 mercenaries across the Sahara led by the converted Spaniard Judar Pasha. The Songhai were defeated at the Battle of Tondibi in 1591 and this led to the collapse of their empire. In 1599 the Mali Empire attempted to fill the void, but was defeated by the Moroccans outside the walls of Djenne.

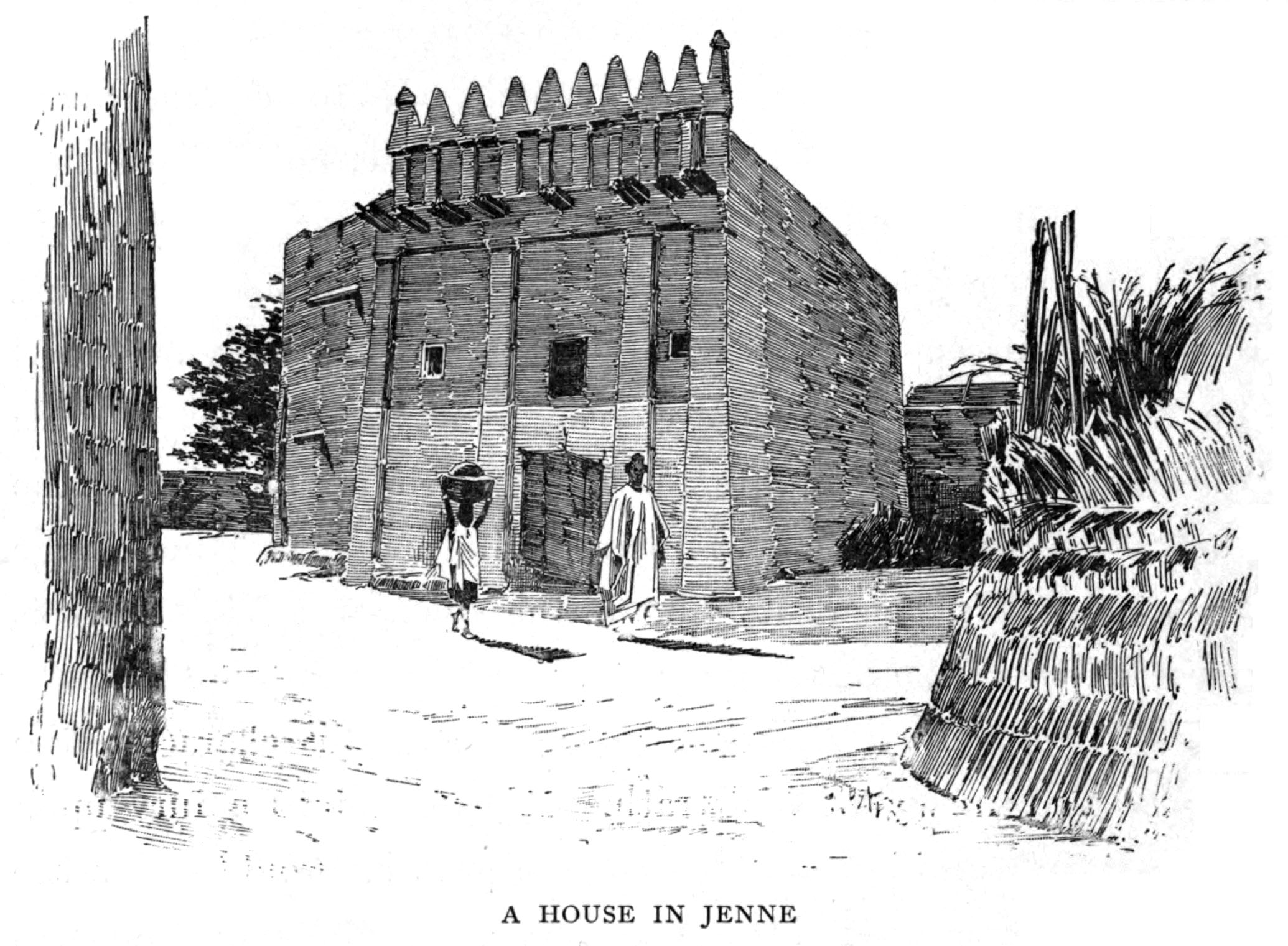
A house in Djenné from Timbuctoo: the Mysterious by Félix Dubois published in 1896.

Despite the fall of the Songhai, Djenné remained a thriving centre of trade and learning. In his chronicle al-Sadi describes the town in 1655, 70 years after the Moroccan conquest:

Jenne is one of the great markets of the Muslims. Those who deal in salt from the mine of Taghaza meet there with those who deal in gold from the mine of Bitu. ... This blessed city of Jenne is the reason why caravans come to Timbuktu from all quarters-north, south, east and west. Jenne is situated to the south and west of Timbuktu beyond the two rivers. When the river is in flood, Jenne becomes an island, but when the flood abates the water is far from it. It begins to be surrounded by water in August, and in February the water recedes again.

After the initial success of the Moroccan occupation, the logistics of controlling a territory across the Sahara soon became too difficult and by 1630 the Saadians had lost control. The collapse of a centralised kingdom able to maintain order over a wide area led to a lack of security and a decline in the movement of traders and scholars. Djenné changed hands several times over the following centuries. The town formed part of the Segou kingdom from 1670 to 1818 and the Massina Empire established by the Fulani ruler Seku Amadu between 1818 and 1861.

In 1828 the French explorer René Caillié, who travelled disguised as a Muslim, became the first European to visit Djenné. He published a detailed description in his book Travels through Central Africa to Timbuctoo:

The town of Jenné is about two miles and half in circumference; it is surrounded by a very ill constructed earth wall, about ten feet high, and fourteen inches thick. There are several gates, but they are all small. The houses are built of bricks dried in the sun. The sand of the isle of Jenné is mixed with a little clay, and it is employed to make bricks of a round form which are sufficiently solid. The houses are as large as those of European villages. The greater part have only one storey ... They are all terraced, have no windows externally, and the apartments receive no air except from an inner court. The only entrance, which is of ordinary size, is closed by a door made of wooden planks, pretty thick, and apparently sawed. The door is fastened on the inside by a double iron chain, and on the outside by a wooden lock made in the country. Some however have iron locks. The apartments are all long and narrow. The walls, especially the outer, are well plastered with sand, for they have no lime. In each house there is a staircase leading to the terrace; but there are no chimneys, and consequently the slaves cook in the open air.

In 1861 the town became part of the Toucouleur Empire under Umar Tall and then in April 1893 French forces under the command of Louis Archinard occupied the town. The French journalist, Félix Dubois, visited the town in 1895, two years after the occupation. He published an account of his travels, together with many illustrations, in his book, Timbuctoo: the mysterious. At the time of his visit the town was still encircled by an adobe wall. It was through this book, and the French edition published in 1897, that Djenné and its architecture became known in Europe and the United States.

The French chose to make Mopti the regional capital and as a result the relative importance of Djenné declined.

== Architecture ==
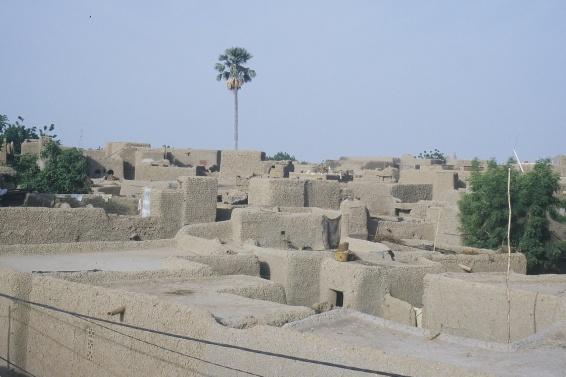
Sudanese-style buildings in the city

Djenné is famous for its Sudanese-style architecture. Nearly all of the buildings in the town, including the Great Mosque, are made from sun-baked earthen bricks which are coated with plaster.

The traditional flat-roofed two-storey houses are built around a small central courtyard and have imposing façades with pilaster like buttresses and an elaborate arrangement of pinnacles forming the parapet above the entrance door. The façades are decorated with bundles of rônier palm (Borassus aethiopum) sticks, called toron, that project about 60 cm from the wall. The toron also serve as readymade scaffolding. Ceramic pipes also extend from the roofline and ensure that the rain water from the roof does not damage the walls.

Some of the houses built before 1900 are in the Toucouleur-style and have a massive covered entrance porch set between two large buttresses. These houses generally have a single small window onto the street set above the entrance door. Many of the more recent two-storey houses are in the Moroccan-style and have small ornate windows but lack the covered entrance porch.

The adobe bricks are made on the river bank using a wooded mold and a mixture of earth and chopped straw. They are typical 36 x 18 x 8 cm in size and when laid are separated by 2 cm of mortar. Up to the 1930s hand molded cylindrical bricks were used called djenné-ferey. All the brickwork is covered with a protective layer of plaster consisting of a mixture of earth and rice husks.

In Djenné the adobe buildings need to be replastered at least every other year and even then the annual rains can cause serious damage. The Great Mosque is replastered every year and yet in 2009 one of the minarets collapsed after a period of heavy rainfall. The older buildings are often entirely rebuilt. A survey of the town in 1984 identified 134 two-storey buildings of significant architectural importance, yet by 1995, in spite of restrictions resulting from the town's World Heritage status, 30% of the buildings on the list had been demolished, with most having been replaced with entirely new adobe buildings. Between 1996 and 2003 the Dutch government funded a project to restore around 100 of the older buildings in the town. For some buildings the restoration work involved little more than replastering the façade while for others it involved demolition and rebuilding. The total cost was 430 million FCFA (655,000 Euro).

In the early 1980s foreign aid organizations funded a system to supply drinking water to both public taps and private homes. However, no wastewater disposal system was installed at the time and, as a result, wastewater was discharged into the streets. This was both unsightly and unhygienic. Between 2004 and 2008 the German government funded a project to construct gravel filled trenches outside each home to allow the wastewater to infiltrate the soil. By 2008 1,880 homes had been provided with these local infiltration systems.

=== Great Mosque ===
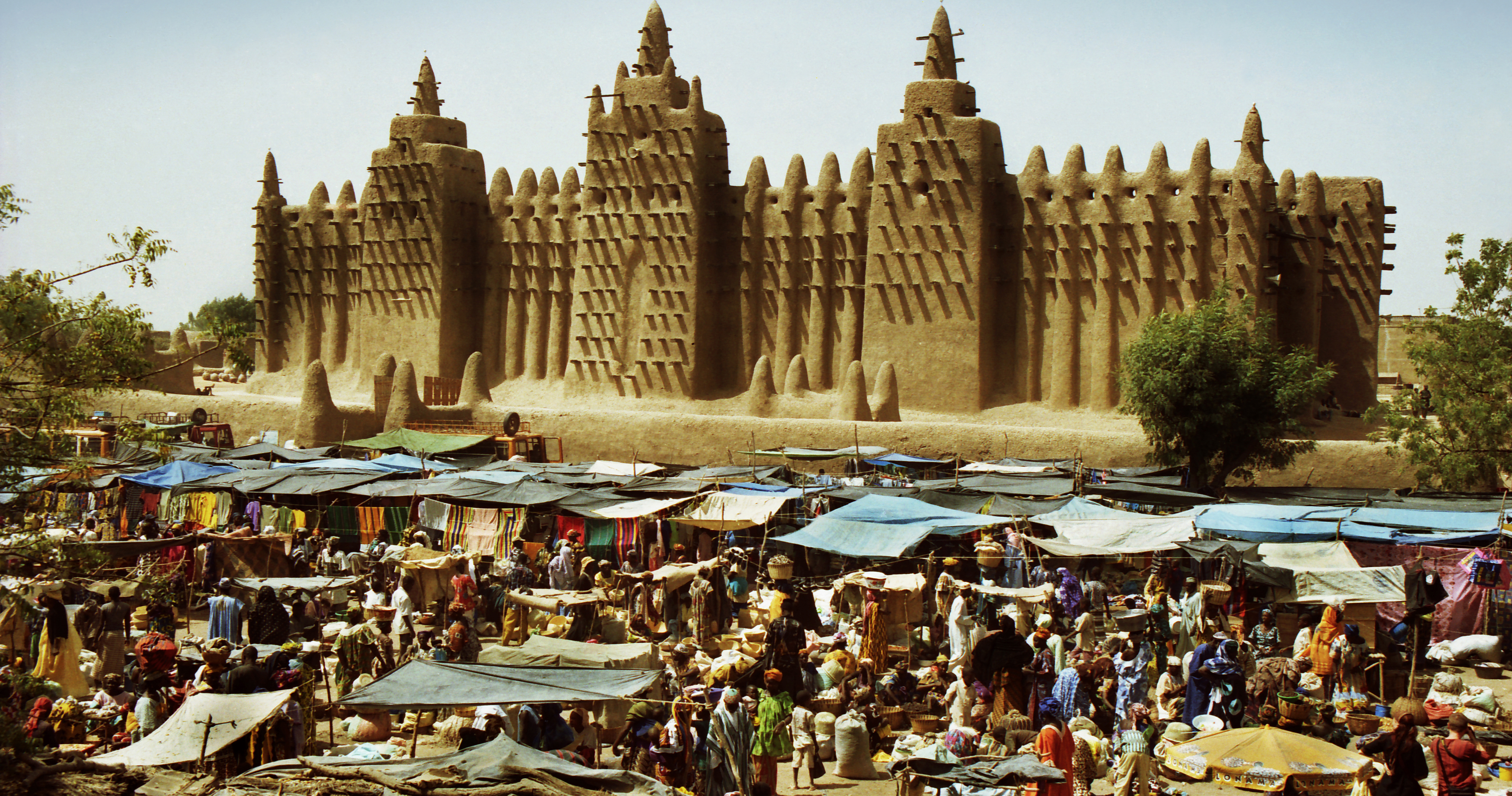
The Great Mosque in Djenné, Mali

In 1906 the French colonial administration arranged for the present Great Mosque to be built on the site of an earlier mosque. Different views have been expressed as to what extent the design of the present mosque was influenced by the colonial administration. The journalist Félix Dubois revisited the town in 1910 and was horrified by what he considered to be a French design with three minarets resembling bell towers while Jean-Louis Bourgeois has argued that the French had little influence except perhaps for the internal arches and that the design is "basically African".

== World Heritage status ==
Old Towns of Djenné
UNESCO World Heritage Site
- Interactive map of Old Towns of Djenné
- Includes: 1. Djenné-Djeno; 2. Kaniana; 3. Tonomba; 4. Djenné; 5. Hambarketolo
- Criteria: Cultural: (iii)(iv)
- Reference: 116rev
- Inscription: 1988 (12th Session)
- Endangered: 2016–...

The Old Towns of Djenné is an archaeological and urban ensemble located in the city of Djenné, that comprises four archaeological sites, namely Djenné-Djeno, Hambarkétolo, Kaniana, and Tonomba. In 1988, it was named by UNESCO as a World Heritage Site.

== Economy ==
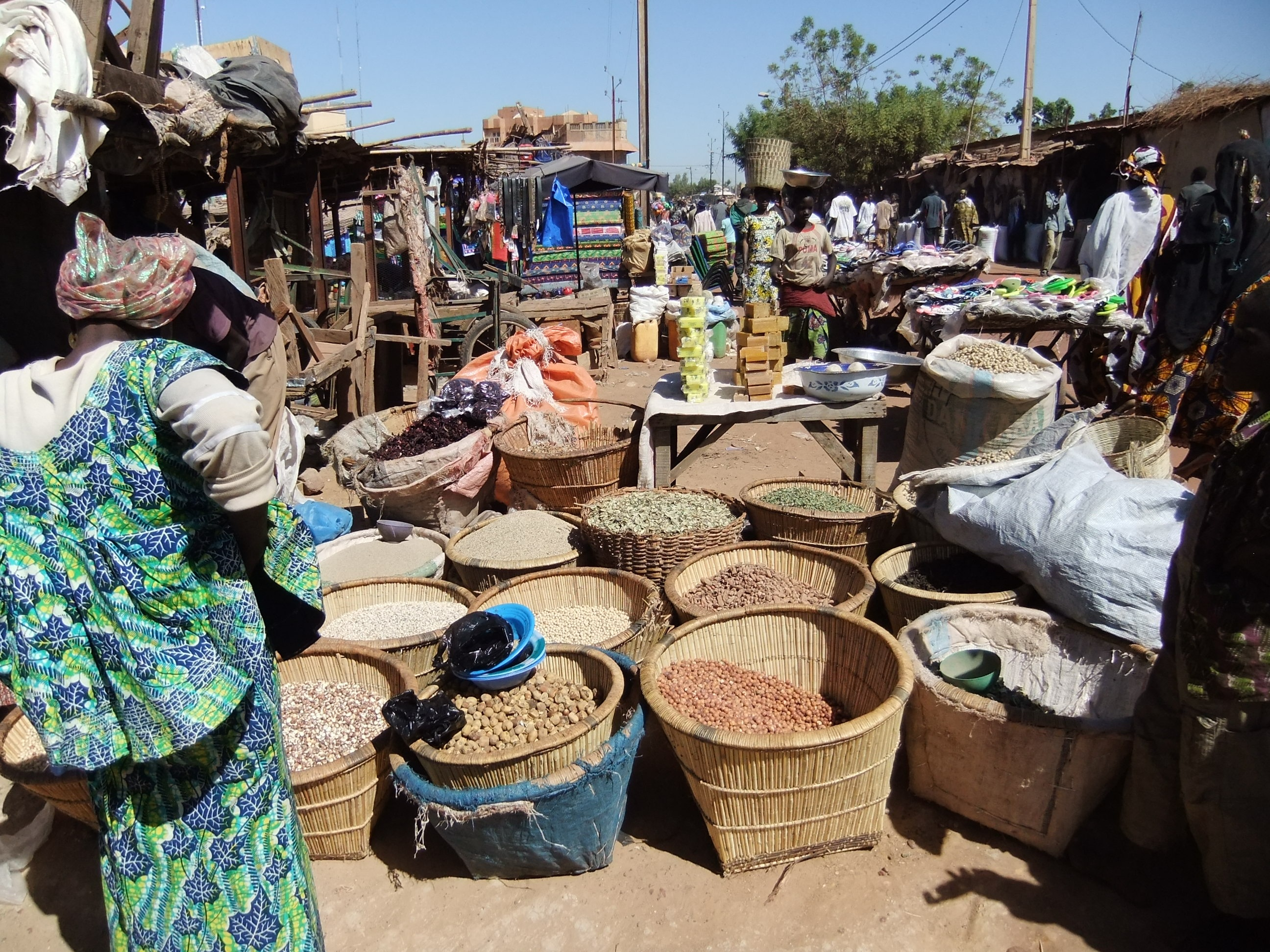
Market in Djenné.

Although historically Djenné had been an important commercial and trading centre, in the 20th century commerce in the town declined due to its relatively isolated position. The local economy is now mainly based on agriculture, fishing and livestock and is very dependent on the annual rainfall and flooding of the Niger and Bani rivers. As a consequence, the severe drought that began in the late 1970s caused great hardship in the already impoverished town.

The town is a centre of Islamic scholarship and the Quranic schools attract students from outside the region.

Tourism is an important part of the local economy particularly in the dryer cooler winter months between November and March. Most tourists visit the Monday market and spend only one night in one of the 5 hotels/guest houses. In 2007 the town received around 15,000 visitors of whom 4,200 stayed overnight. Of these just over a third were from France with the remainder coming from a large number of other countries. In 2005 tourism contributed around 450 million CFA francs (687,000 Euro) to the economy of the town.

The town has received significant quantities of foreign aid with many countries contributing. The Canadian government helped fund the infrastructure to supply drinking water while the United States has contributed funds to maintain the system. The Dutch government funded a project to restore and plaster some of the old adobe buildings and the German government funded a scheme to improve the sanitation. Repairs to the mosque have been funded by the Aga Khan Trust for Culture.

== Sights ==
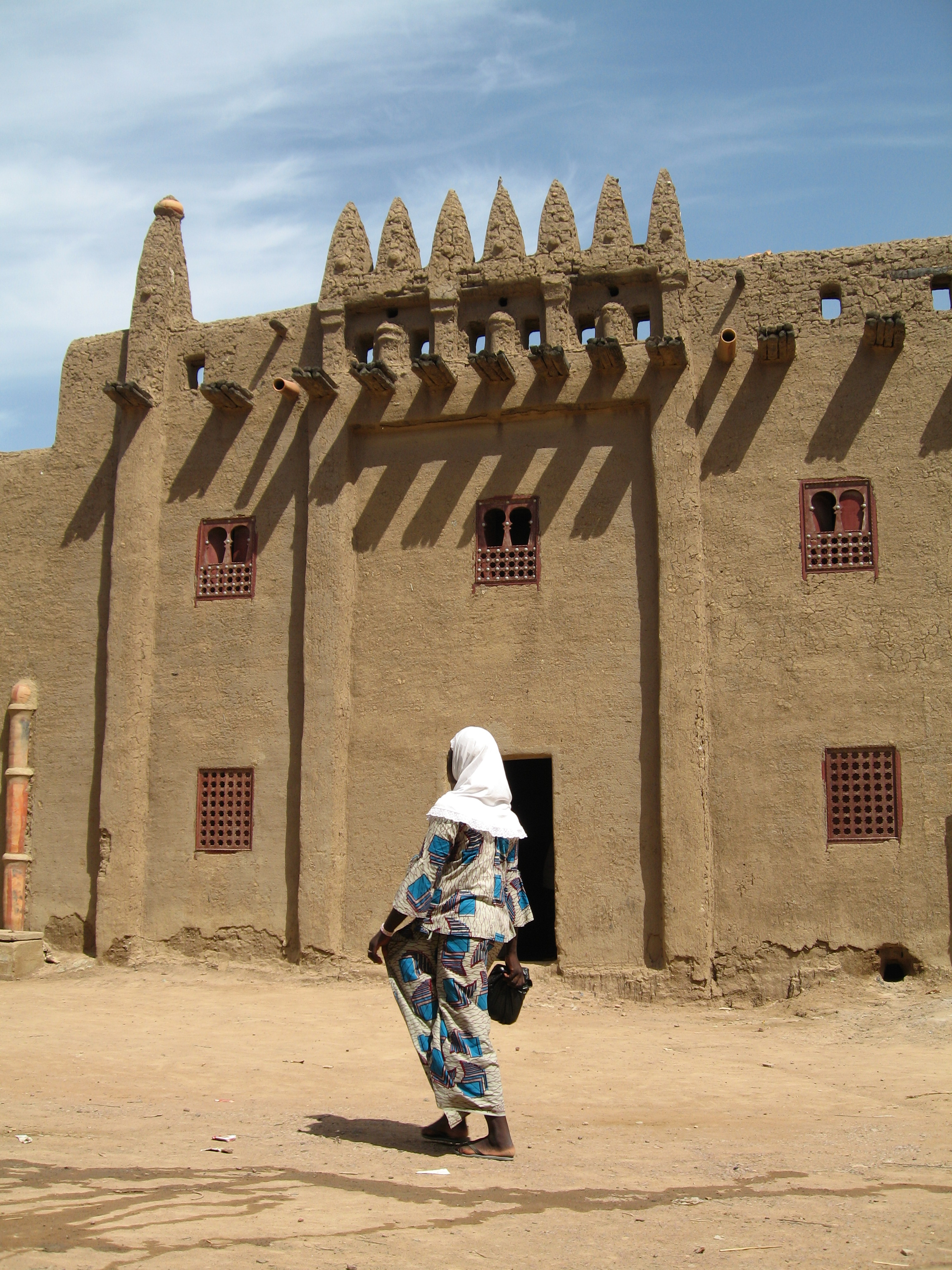
Classic earth-brick house

The main attractions are the Great Mosque and the two-story adobe houses with their monumental façades. The best known house is that of the Maiga family who supply the town's tradition chief. This old building with its Toucouleur-style entrance porch is in the Algasba district on the eastern side of the town. René Caillé visited the house in 1828. Other attractions include the tomb of Tapama Djenepo, who in legend was sacrificed on the founding of the city, and the remains of Djenné-Jéno, an important settlement from the 3rd century BC until the 13th century AD.

The weekly Monday market, when buyers and sellers converge on the town from the surrounding regions, is a key tourist attraction. There is also a daily (women's) market that takes place in a courtyard opposite the mosque.

The town is approximately eight hours by road from Bamako. The coaches to Mopti drop off passengers at the crossroads 29 km (18 mi) from Djenné.

The great mosque is out of bounds for non-Muslim tourists.

== Demographics ==
The inhabitants of Djenné mostly speak a Songhay variety termed Djenné Chiini, but the languages spoken also reflect the diversity of the area. The villages around it variously speak Bozo, Fulfulde, or Bambara.

== Sources ==
- Abitol, Michel (1979). Tombouctou et Les Arma. De la Conquête marocaine du Soudan nigérien en 1591 á l'hégémonie de l'Empire Peulh du Macina en 1833 (in French). Paris: G.P. Maisonneuve et Larose. ISBN 2-7068-0770-9.
- Alderlieste, M.C.; Langeveld, J.G. (2005), "Wastewater planning in Djenné, Mali. A pilot project for the local infiltration of domestic wastewater", Water Science and Technology, 51 (2): 57–64, Bibcode:2005WSTec..51...57A, doi:10.2166/wst.2005.0032, PMID 15790228.
- Archinard, Louis (1895), Le Soudan en 1893 (in French), Le Havre, France: Imprimer de la Société des Anciens Courtiers.
- Basset, René (1909), Mission au Sénégal (Volume 1) (in French), Paris: Ernest Leroux.
- Bedaux, R.; Diaby, B.; Maas, P., eds. (2003), L'architecture de Djenné (Mali): la pérennité d'un Patrimonie Mondial (in French), Leiden: Rijksmuseum, ISBN 978-90-5349-420-2.
- Bourgeois, Jean-Louis (1987), "The history of the great mosques of Djenné", African Arts, 20 (3): 54–92, doi:10.2307/3336477, JSTOR 3336477
- Brown, William A. (1968), "Toward a chronology for the Caliphate of Hamdullahi (Māsina)", Cahiers d'Études Africaines, 8 (31): 428–434, doi:10.3406/cea.1968.3136.
- Caillié, René (1830), Travels through Central Africa to Timbuctoo; and across the Great Desert, to Morocco, performed in the years 1824–1828 (2 Vols), London: Colburn & Bentley. Google books: Volume 1, Volume 2.
- Crone, G.R., ed. (1937), The Voyages of Cadamosto and other documents on Western Africa in the second half of the fifteenth century, London: Hakluyt Society.
- de Gramont, Sanche (1976), The Strong Brown God: The story of the Niger River, Boston: Houghton Mifflin, ISBN 978-0-395-25224-6.
- Dubois, Félix (1896), Timbuctoo: the mysterious, Tombouctou la mystérieuse.English.1896, White, Diana (trans.), New York: Longmans, hdl:2027/mdp.39015008010343.
- Dubois, Félix (1911), Notre beau Niger (in French), Paris: Flammarion.
- Fisher, Humphrey J. (1978), "Leo Africanus and the Songhay conquest of Hausaland", International Journal of African Historical Studies, 11 (1): 86–112, doi:10.2307/217055, JSTOR 217055.
- Fisher, William; Meierotto, Lisa; Russel, Ryan (2001), The Talo Dam Project: Projet de Mise en Valeur Des Plaines Du Moyen Bani (PDF), Clark University, archived from the original on 26 July 2011. Pages 30–31 contain a table dated 2003 prepared by J.R. Patenaude, giving values for the discharge in an average year (assumed to be 125 m^{3}/s or 3.9 km^{3}/y).
- Gomez, Michael (2018). African dominion : a new history of empire in early and medieval West Africa. Princeton, NJ: Princeton University Press. ISBN 9780691177427.
- Holder, Gilles (2012). "Djenné, « la ville aux 313 saints » Convocation des savoirs, « lutte des classements » et production d'une ville sainte au Mali". Cahiers d'études africaines. 4 (208).
- Hunwick, John O. (1999), Timbuktu and the Songhay Empire: Al-Sadi's Tarikh al-Sudan down to 1613 and other contemporary documents, Leiden: Brill, ISBN 978-90-04-11207-0.
- Kaba, Lansiné (1981), "Archers, musketeers, and mosquitoes: The Moroccan invasion of the Sudan and the Songhay resistance (1591–1612)", Journal of African History, 22 (4): 457–475, doi:10.1017/S0021853700019861, JSTOR 181298, PMID 11632225, S2CID 41500711.
- Kâti, Mahmoûd Kâti ben el-Hâdj el-Motaouakkel (1913), Tarikh el-fettach ou Chronique du chercheur, pour servir à l'histoire des villes, des armées et des principaux personnages du Tekrour (in French), Houdas, O., Delafosse, M. ed. and trans., Paris: Ernest Leroux. Also available from Aluka but requires subscription.
- Leo Africanus (1896), The History and Description of Africa (3 Vols), Brown, Robert, editor, London: Hakluyt Society. Internet Archive: Volume 1, Volume 2, Volume 3. The original text of Pory's 1600 English translation together with an introduction and notes by the editor.
- Levtzion, Nehemia (1973), Ancient Ghana and Mali, London: Methuen, ISBN 978-0-8419-0431-6.
- Maas, Pierre; Mommersteeg, Geert, eds. (1992), Djenné: chef-d'oeuvre architectural (in French), Amsterdam: Institut Royal des Tropiques, ISBN 978-90-6832-228-6.
- Marchand, Trevor H.J. (2009), The Masons of Djenné, Bloomington, IN: Indiana University Press, ISBN 978-0-253-22072-1.
- Masonen, Pekka (2000), The Negroland Revisited: Discovery and Invention of the Sudanese Middle Ages, Helsinki: Finnish Academy of Science and Letters, ISBN 978-951-41-0886-0.
- McIntosh, Roderick J.; McIntosh, Susan Keech (1981), "The inland Niger delta before the empire of Mali: evidence from Jenne-jeno", Journal of African History, 22 (1): 1–22, doi:10.1017/S0021853700018983, JSTOR 182149, S2CID 162284097.
- McIntosh, Roderick J. (1998), The peoples of the Middle Niger: the island of gold, London: Blackwell, ISBN 978-0-631-17361-8.
- McIntosh, Roderick J.; McIntosh, Susan Keech (2004), "Results of recent excavations at Jenné-jeno and Djenné, Mali" (PDF), in Sanogo, K.; Togola, T. (eds.), Proceedings of the Eleventh Congress of the Pan-African Association for Prehistory and Related Fields, Bamako: Institut des Sciences Humaines, pp. 469–481.
- McIntosh, Susan Keech (1995), McIntosh, Susan Keech (ed.), Excavations at Jenné-Jeno, Hambarketolo, and Kaniana (Inland Niger Delta, Mali), the 1981 season, Berkeley: University of California Press, ISBN 978-0-520-09785-8, JSTOR al.ch.document.sip100038.
- Meierotto, Lisa (2009), "The uneven geographies of transnational advocacy: The case of the Talo Dam" (PDF), Journal of Environmental Management, 90 (Suppl. 3): S279–S285, Bibcode:2009JEnvM..90S.279M, doi:10.1016/j.jenvman.2008.07.024, PMID 19008033, archived from the original (PDF) on 26 June 2010.
- Pereira, Duarte Pacheco (1892), Esmeraldo de situ orbis (in Portuguese), Lisbon: Imprensa Nacional.
- Pereira, Duarte Pacheco (1937), "Esmeraldo de situ orbis", The Geographical Journal, 90 (4), Kimble, George H.T. trans. and ed., London: Hakluyt Society: 385, Bibcode:1937GeogJ..90..385T, doi:10.2307/1787713, JSTOR 1787713.
- Sanogo, Klessigué; Fané, Yamoussa, eds. (2008), Plan de Conservation et de Gestion des " Villes anciennes de Djenné " – Mali, 2008–2012 (in French), République du Mali: Ministère de la Culture du Mali/UNESCO.
- Wilks, Ivor (1982a), "Wangara, Akan and Portuguese in the fifteenth and sixteenth centuries. I. The matter of Bitu", Journal of African History, 23 (3): 333–349, doi:10.1017/S0021853700020958, JSTOR 182099.
- Wilks, Ivor (1982b), "Wangara, Akan and Portuguese in the fifteenth and sixteenth centuries. II. The struggle for trade", Journal of African History, 23 (4): 463–472, doi:10.1017/S0021853700021307, JSTOR 182036, S2CID 163064591.
- Zwarts, Leo; van Beukering, Pieter; Kone, Bakary; et al., eds. (2005), The Niger, a lifeline: Effective water management in the Upper Niger Basin (PDF), Veenwouden, the Netherlands: Altenburg & Wymenga, ISBN 978-90-807150-6-6, archived from the original (PDF) on 24 July 2011. Also published in French with the title Le Niger: une Artère vitale. Gestion efficace de l’eau dans le bassin du Haut Niger.
