= April 2022 Mopti region attacks =

Killings in Mopti region, Mali

- Part of Mali War
Date	April 24, 2022
Location	Sévaré, Niono, and Bapho, Mopti region, Mali
Result	Tactical Katibat Macina victory, strategic Malian victory

Belligerents
Mali	Katibat Macina

Casualties and losses
15 soldiers killed 20 soldiers injured	11 jihadists killed
- 6 civilians killed

On April 24, 2022, militants from Katibat Macina attacked Malian Army bases in the cities of Sévaré, Niono, and Bapho, all in central Mali's Mopti Region. The attacks killed fifteen soldiers and six civilians.

== Prelude ==
Katibat Macina is a part of the al-Qaeda aligned Jama'at Nasr al-Islam wal Muslimin, which formed in 2017 as a coalition of five jihadist groups that originally rebelled against the Malian government in 2012. Katibat Macina is unique in the fact that it mainly conducts operations in central Mali's Mopti Region, in particular Macina Cercle. In March 2022, the Malian army, along with Russian paramilitary Wagner Group, laid siege to the JNIM-controlled town of Moura. In the siege, Malian and Wagner forces detained and tortured a number of civilians, with the UN estimating 300 civilians were killed.

== Attacks ==
On the morning of April 24, three explosive-laden vehicles drove into Malian bases in the towns of Sévaré, Niono, and Bapho. The first attack occurred in Sevare, with the Malian government stating that six soldiers were killed and fifteen were injured in the attack. Around five minutes later, similar attacks occurred in Niono and Bapho, wounding four in Niono and one in Bapho. The three attacks killed a total of fifteen soldiers and six civilians. The Malian government claimed that in counterattacks, eleven jihadists were killed during the attacks, and three others arrested. In a statement released by Katibat Macina, the group alleged to have also attacked Ségou, but the Malian military did not mention this in their statement. However, the Malian government stated a base in central Mali was ambushed in a separate incident, killing ten jihadists.

== Aftermath ==
Katibat Macina declared responsibility for the attack in an audio recording obtained by AFP. Both MINUSMA and the United States released statements condemning the attacks. In response to the attacks, Malian forces launched airstrikes on JNIM positions in Douentza and Ténenkou cercles, killing around a dozen jihadists.
