= Robinet El Ataye massacre =

- Part of Mali War
- Location: Robinet El Ataye, Segou Region, Mali
- Date: March 5–6, 2022; 8:30am, March 5 – ~10am, March 6
- Target: Civilians
- Deaths: 33
- Injuries: Several
- Victims: 29 Mauritanian nationals, 4 Malian Tuaregs
- Perpetrators: Malian Armed Forces "White-skinned men" (possibly Wagner Group)

Between March 5 and 6, 2022, Malian Armed Forces and Wagner Group soldiers killed 33 civilians, mostly Mauritanian nationals, in the village of Robinet El Ataye, Ségou Region, Mali. The massacre was one of the first massacres conducted by the Wagner Group since its arrival in Mali in early 2022.

== Background ==
In 2021, Assimi Goïta led a coup that overthrew the Malian government and installed himself as president, a year after a first coup led by him that overthrew the French-backed democratically elected government of Ibrahim Boubacar Keïta. Goita accused the French intervention in Mali against Jama'at Nusrat al-Islam wal-Muslimin, Tuareg rebels, and the Islamic State as not being effective in the eight years it had been in Mali, and demanded the French Operation Barkhane leave the country by the end of 2023. The Malian government brought in the Russian paramilitary Wagner Group in early 2022 as a replacement for the French. Immediately upon arriving in the country, the Wagner group began massacreing civilians suspected to be involved with JNIM.

== Massacre ==
Robinet El Ataye is a village located near the Wagadou forest, a known hideout along the Mauritanian-Malian border for JNIM to retreat into Mauritanian territory in exchange for not attacking Mauritania. The village, among others, is also a transit point for Mauritanians and Malians traveling between the two countries. Robinet El Ataye in particular hosts a well oft frequented by Mauritanian herders traveling between borders. Little was known about the massacre until the United Nations' Group of Experts on Mali report was released in August 2022.

Between March 5 and 6, 2022, the Malian army carried out a series of operations along the Mauritanian border. Six villages were targeted by the army, including Robinet El Ataye. Witnesses reported that "white-skinned" soldiers were present, most likely Wagner Group mercenaries. At 8:30am on March 5, the white men rounded up all the men and boys in the village, tied their hands behind their backs, and blindfolded them. Houses were looted, and the women were told to go into their homes and not watch. Once the boys and men were gathered in the main square, the Malian soldiers arrived around 11am and began beating the victims with sticks while other soldiers blocked doors to prevent women from leaving.

Some of the younger boys were released, and the Malian soldiers took away 29 Mauritanians and four Tuareg Malians. The women expected the men to return, but were informed the next day that their bodies had been shot and burnt. In the five other villages where Malian and Wagner troops entered, beatings occurred but the only killings of civilians occurred in Robinet El Ataye.

== Aftermath ==
The massacre sparked tensions between Mauritania and Mali. In the immediate aftermath of the massacre, the Malian government announced that they would be carrying out an internal investigation into the disappearances of the civilians. The Malian government also prohibited civilians from travelling between Mauritania and Mali.

Eleven bodies found in Robinet El Ataye were later handed over to the Mauritanian government.

The Wagner Group was accused of many more massacres shortly afterward. The Moura massacre left hundreds of civilians dead in Moura, and in April when the French left a base in Hombori Wagner mercenaries killed dozens of civilians there.
