= Madiama =

- Commune and village
- Location in Mali
- Coordinates: 13°48′N 4°24′W
- Country: Mali
- Region: Mopti Region
- Cercle: Djenné Cercle

Population (2009 Census)
  - Total: 12,406
  - Ethnicities: Marka Fulani Bambara
- Time zone: UTC+0 (GMT)

Madiama is a rural commune and village in the Cercle of Djenné in the Mopti Region of Mali. The commune contains ten villages.

The commune lies to the west of the main RN6 highway linking Bamako with Gao and is crossed by the spur road linking the highway with the Djenné ferry across the Bani River. The commune is bounded on its west side by the urban commune of Djenné and the commune of Dandougou Fakala.
