= Sofara =

- Town
- Location in Mali
- Coordinates: 14°1′3″N 4°13′52″W
- Country: Mali
- Region: Mopti Region
- Cercle: Djenné Cercle
- Commune: Fakala
- Elevation: 271 m (889 ft)
- Time zone: UTC+0 (GMT)

Sofara (Fula: Kaka) is a small town and seat (chef-lieu) of the rural commune of Fakala in the Cercle of Djenné in the Mopti Region of southern-central Mali.

The town lies on the right bank of the Bani River. A weekly market is held in the town on Tuesdays that serves the settlements in the region.
