= Gagna =

- Village
- Location in Mali
- Coordinates: 14°01′N 4°31′W
- Country: Mali
- Region: Mopti Region
- Cercle: Djenné Cercle
- Commune: Derary
- Time zone: UTC+0 (GMT)

Gagna (Gáɲàgà) is a village and seat (chef-lieu) of the rural commune of Derary in the Cercle of Djenné in the Mopti Region of southern-central Mali.

Tommo So is spoken in the village. The local surname is Kanambaye.
