= Kewa =

Kewa may refer to:

- Kewa (plant), a genus of plants belonging to the family Kewaceae, formerly placed in Hypertelis, Molluginaceae
- Kéwa, a rural commune of the Cercle of Djenné in the Mopti Region of Mali
- Kewa language of Papua New Guinea
- Kewa Pueblo, New Mexico, an Indian pueblo in Sandoval County, New Mexico, in the United States
