= Taga, Mali =

Taga
- Village
- Location in Mali
- Coordinates: 14°13′7″N 4°17′42″W
- Country: Mali
- Region: Mopti Region
- Cercle: Djenné Cercle
- Commune: Femaye
- Time zone: UTC+0 (GMT)

Taga is a village and seat of the commune of Femaye in the Cercle of Djenné in the Mopti Region of southern-central Mali.
