= Konio =

Konio may refer to:

- Konio, Mopti, Mali, a village
- Konio Heagi (born 1973), Papua New Guinean cricketer
- Konio Oala (born 1996), Papua New Guinean cricketer
