= Senossa =

- Village
- Location in Mali
- Coordinates: 13.956°N 4.569°W
- Country: Mali
- Region: Mopti Region
- Cercle: Djenné Cercle
- Commune: Ouro Ali
- Time zone: UTC+0 (GMT)

Senossa (or Senoussa) is a village and the seat of the commune of Ouro Ali in the Cercle of Djenné in the Mopti Region of southern-central Mali.
