= Mougna =

- Village
- Location in Mali
- Coordinates: 13.883°N 4.819°W
- Country: Mali
- Region: Mopti Region
- Cercle: Djenné Cercle
- Commune: Néma-Badenyakafo
- Time zone: UTC+0 (GMT)

Mougna is a village and the administrative seat of the rural commune of Néma-Badenyakafo located in the Cercle of Djenné, Mopti Region of south-central Mali.
