= Kouakourou =

- Village
- Location in Mali
- Coordinates: 14°13′20″N 4°29′36″W
- Country: Mali
- Region: Mopti Region
- Cercle: Djenné Cercle
- Commune: Kéwa
- Time zone: UTC+0 (GMT)

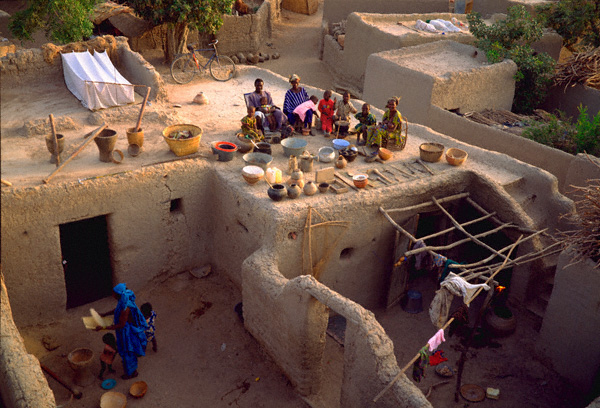
A family living in Kouakourou, Mali

Kouakourou is a village and seat of the rural commune of Kéwa in the Cercle of Djenné in the Mopti Region of southern-central Mali.

The market that is held in the village on Saturdays serves many settlements in the surrounding region.

After the rout of the Malian army against the JNIM jihadists on 18 July 2026, Kouakourou has been emptied of its inhabitants and occupied by JNIM.
