= Togue Mourari =

Togué Mourari
- Commune
- Location in Mali
- Coordinates: 14°19′40″N 4°36′0″W
- Country: Mali
- Region: Mopti Region
- Cercle: Djenné Cercle
- Admin HQ (Chef-lieu): Mourrah

Population (2009 census)
  - Total: 6,818
  - Ethnicities: Fulani Bozo Marka
- Time zone: UTC+0 (GMT)

Togué Mourari is a rural commune of the Cercle of Djenné in the Mopti Region of Mali. The commune contains 11 villages. The administrative center (chef-lieu) is the village of Mourrah.

Togué Mourari is the most northerly of the 12 communes in the Djenné Cercle, and the only one located north of the River Niger. Mourrak is 60 km from Djenné.
