= Keke, Mali =

Kéké
- Village
- Location in Mali
- Coordinates: 13.669°N 4.633°W
- Country: Mali
- Region: Mopti Region
- Cercle: Djenné Cercle
- Commune: Niansanarié
- Time zone: UTC+0 (GMT)

Kéké is a village and seat of the commune of Niansanarié in the Cercle of Djenné in the Mopti Region of southern-central Mali.
