= Gomitogo =

- Village
- Location in Mali
- Coordinates: 13.911°N 4.652°W
- Country: Mali
- Region: Mopti Region
- Cercle: Djenné Cercle
- Commune: Pondori
- Time zone: UTC+0 (GMT)

Gomitogo is a village and seat of the commune of Pondori in the Cercle of Djenné in the Mopti Region of southern-central Mali.
