= Nema Badenyakafo =

Néma-Badenyakafo
- Commune
- Location in Mali
- Coordinates: 13.883°N 4.819°W
- Country: Mali
- Region: Mopti Region
- Cercle: Djenné Cercle
- Admin HQ (Chef-lieu): Mougna

Population (2009 census)
  - Total: 45,861
- Time zone: UTC+0 (GMT)

Néma-Badenyakafo is a rural commune of the Cercle of Djenné in the Mopti Region of Mali. The commune contains 29 villages. The principal village (chef-lieu) is Mougna.
