= Konio, Mopti =

Konio
- Village
- Location in Mali
- Coordinates: 13°40′41″N 4°28′8″W
- Country: Mali
- Region: Mopti Region
- Cercle: Djenné Cercle
- Commune: Dandougou Fakala
- Time zone: UTC+0 (GMT)

Konio is a village and seat (chef-lieu) of the rural commune of Dandougou Fakala in the Cercle of Djenné in the Mopti Region of southern-central Mali.

The market that is held in the village on Saturdays serves many settlements in the surrounding region.
