= Femaye =

- Commune
- Location in Mali
- Coordinates: 14°13′N 4°18′W
- Country: Mali
- Region: Mopti Region
- Cercle: Djenné Cercle

Population (2009 census)
  - Total: 16,379
  - Ethnicities: Bambara Marka Fulani Bozo
- Time zone: UTC+0 (GMT)

Femaye is a rural commune of the Cercle of Djenné in the Mopti Region of Mali. The commune includes 21 villages. The principal village (chef-lieu) is Taga.

Taga is 18 km from Djenné but the route is impassable when the Bani River floods.
