= Hombori massacre =

2022 massacre in Mali

- Part of the Mali War
- Hombori (Mali)
- Location: Hombori, Mali
- Date: 19 April 2022
- Victims: 50+ civilians killed 500–600 arrested
- Perpetrators: Malian Armed Forces; Wagner Group
- Motive: Retaliation to a bombing

The Hombori massacre took place on 19 April 2022. It was perpetrated by the Malian Army and Russian Wagner Group mercenaries, when they opened fire on a market in Hombori, Mali.

== Massacre ==
Around 9:30 a.m. on 19 April, a Malian army vehicle ran over an IED outside of Hombori, killing a Wagner mercenary. The Malian and Russian troops then proceeded to walk over to the market square in Hombori, and opened fire on the crowd gathered there due to the town's market day. A Malian aid worker present at the scene later stated that

"It was a fair day. A few terrorists were in hiding. There were firefights. Then the soldiers attacked everyone, assaulting the inhabitants, robbing them of their jewellery, money and telephone, while others fired in all directions."

The market shooting killed around 50 civilians. Immediately following the massacre, Malian and Russian soldiers detained around 500 civilians at the local base in Hombori. Days later, one Malian soldier shot 20 out of the 27 detained civilians at the base. Two more detainees were tortured to death. The rest of the 500 were freed later. The victims of the market massacre also included a woman and a child.

== Reactions and aftermath ==
=== Initial response ===
The Malian Army, after an initial denial, confirmed the death of the Russian mercenary, although both Mali and Wagner Group denied claims of the massacre. Instead, the Malian government claimed that they launched a counter-terrorism operation "neutralizing" 18 "terrorists". In the statement, the government claimed to have also arrested around 600 people, with one dying in custody.

=== Aftermath ===
The United Nations expressed concern about the Hombori massacre, as it came just a month after Mali and Wagner troops killed around 300 civilians in Moura. On 23 April, just four days after the massacre in Hombori, clashes in Mondoro and Boni killed several Malian and Wagner troops. Twelve people were also killed, although it is unclear whether they were extremists or civilians. On 10 May, Wagner kidnapped five people at the Hombori market.

=== Gossi mass graves ===
After a video was released of Caucasian soldiers in unidentifiable uniforms burning dozens of bodies, and a subsequent video of a mass grave near Gossi, the Malian government released a statement blaming the French for the killings. Russia backed these claims, also accusing France. France instead claimed that the bodies were from the Hombori massacre, denying the Russian and Malian claims stating that they had relinquished control of the base to Malian troops days prior to the Hombori massacre. France also claimed the Twitter account the videos surfaced from was a Russian disinformation campaign. MINUSMA backed up France, stating that the bodies arrived at the base on 20 April, when France no longer had control over the base. Mali did not respond to these claims.

== See also ==
- List of massacres in Mali
