= Niansanarie =

- Commune
- Location in Mali
- Coordinates: 13.669°N 4.633°W
- Country: Mali
- Region: Mopti Region
- Cercle: Djenné Cercle
- Admin HQ (Chef-lieu): Kéké

Population (2009 census)
  - Total: 4,930
- Time zone: UTC+0 (GMT)

Niansanarie is a commune of the Cercle of Djenné in the Mopti Region of Mali. The main village (chef-lieu) is Kéké.
