= Pondori =

- Commune
- Location in Mali
- Coordinates: 13.911°N 4.652°W
- Country: Mali
- Region: Mopti Region
- Cercle: Djenné Cercle
- Admin HQ (Chef-lieu): Gomitogo

Population (2009 Census)
  - Total: 4,315
  - Ethnicities: Bozo Sonike Bambara
- Time zone: UTC+0 (GMT)

Pondori is a commune of the Cercle of Djenné in the Mopti Region of Mali. The principal village lies at Gomitogo. The commune also includes the villages of Koba, Kobassa, Siroumou, Noina and Djera. In the census of 2009 the commune had a population of 4,315, a substantially lower value than the population of 7,748 recorded in the 1998 census.
