= Kéwa =

- Commune
- Location in Mali
- Coordinates: 14°13′20″N 4°29′36″W
- Country: Mali
- Region: Mopti Region
- Cercle: Djenné Cercle
- Admin HQ (Chef-lieu): Kouakourou

Area
  - Total: 986 km^{2} (381 sq mi)

Population (2009 census)
  - Total: 24,165
  - Density: 24.5/km^{2} (63.5/sq mi)
- Time zone: UTC+0 (GMT)

Kéwa is a rural commune of the Cercle of Djenné in the Mopti Region of Mali. The principal village (chef-lieu) is Kouakourou.
