= Ouro Ali =

- Commune
- Location in Mali
- Coordinates: 13.956°N 4.569°W
- Country: Mali
- Region: Mopti Region
- Cercle: Djenné Cercle
- Admin HQ (Chef-lieu): Senossa

Population (2009 Census)
  - Total: 10,354
  - Ethnicities: Bambara Fulani
- Time zone: UTC+0 (GMT)

Ouro Ali is a rural commune of the Cercle of Djenné in the Mopti Region of Mali. The commune includes the villages of Senossa, Koloye, Ouro Djikoye, Siratintin, Weraka, Wono, Kotola, Djimatogo, Ali Samba, Kandia and Somena. The administrative center (chef-lieu) is the village of Senossa. In the census of 2009 the commune had a population of 10,354.
