= Moura, Mali =

Moura
- Village
- Location in Mali
- Coordinates: 14°19′40″N 4°36′0″W
- Country: Mali
- Region: Mopti Region
- Cercle: Djenné Cercle
- Commune: Togué Mourari

Population
  - Estimate: ~10,000
- Time zone: UTC+0 (GMT)

Moura (also Mourrah and Mora) is a town and seat of the rural commune of Togué Mourari in the Cercle of Djenné in the Mopti Region of southern-central Mali. The weekly market is held on a Sunday. Moura's population is around 10,000.

== See also ==
- Moura massacre, a massacre of civilians in the town by the Malian Armed Forces during the Mali War.
