= Fakala =

- Commune
- Location in Mali
- Coordinates: 14.0175°N 4.231°W
- Country: Mali
- Region: Mopti Region
- Cercle: Djenné Cercle
- Admin HQ (Chef-lieu): Sofara

Population (2009)
  - Total: 32,689
- Time zone: UTC+0 (GMT)

Fakala is a Rural Commune of the Cercle of Djenné in the Mopti Region of Mali. The commune contains 30 villages and had a population of 32,689 in the census of 2009. The local government is based in the small town of Sofara.
