= Derary =

- Commune
- Location in Mali
- Coordinates: 14.012°N 4.511°W
- Country: Mali
- Region: Mopti Region
- Cercle: Djenné Cercle
- Admin HQ (Chef-lieu): Gagna

Population (2009 Census)
  - Total: 6,558
  - Ethnicities: Bambara Fulani Bozo
- Time zone: UTC+0 (GMT)

Derary is a rural commune of the Cercle of Djenné in the Mopti Region of Mali. The commune contains eight villages. The administrative center (chef-lieu) is the village of Gagna. In the 2009 census the commune had a population of 6,558.
