= Dandougou Fakala =

- Commune
- Location in Mali
- Coordinates: 13.678°N 4.469°W
- Country: Mali
- Region: Mopti Region
- Cercle: Djenné Cercle
- Admin HQ (Chef-lieu): Konio

Population (2009 Census)
  - Total: 9,841
- Time zone: UTC+0 (GMT)

Dandougou Fakala is a rural commune in the Cercle of Djenné in the Mopti Region of Mali. The commune contains ten villages. The administrative center (chef-lieu) is the village of Konio. In the 2009 census the commune had a population of 9,841.
