= Moura massacre =

2022 siege and killing of civilians in Mali

- Part of the Mali War
Date	27 March 2022 – 31 March 2022
Location	Mourrah, Mali 14°19′40″N 4°36′0″W
Result	Malian/Wagner victory

Belligerents
Mali Armed Forces; Wagner Group	Al-Qaeda in the Islamic Maghreb: Jama'at Nasr al-Islam wal Muslimin

Strength
Wagner Group: ~100	At least 30

Casualties and losses
Wagner Group: 2+	Per Mali: 203 killed; 51 captured
- 300 civilians killed (per Human Rights Watch); 500 killed (UN)
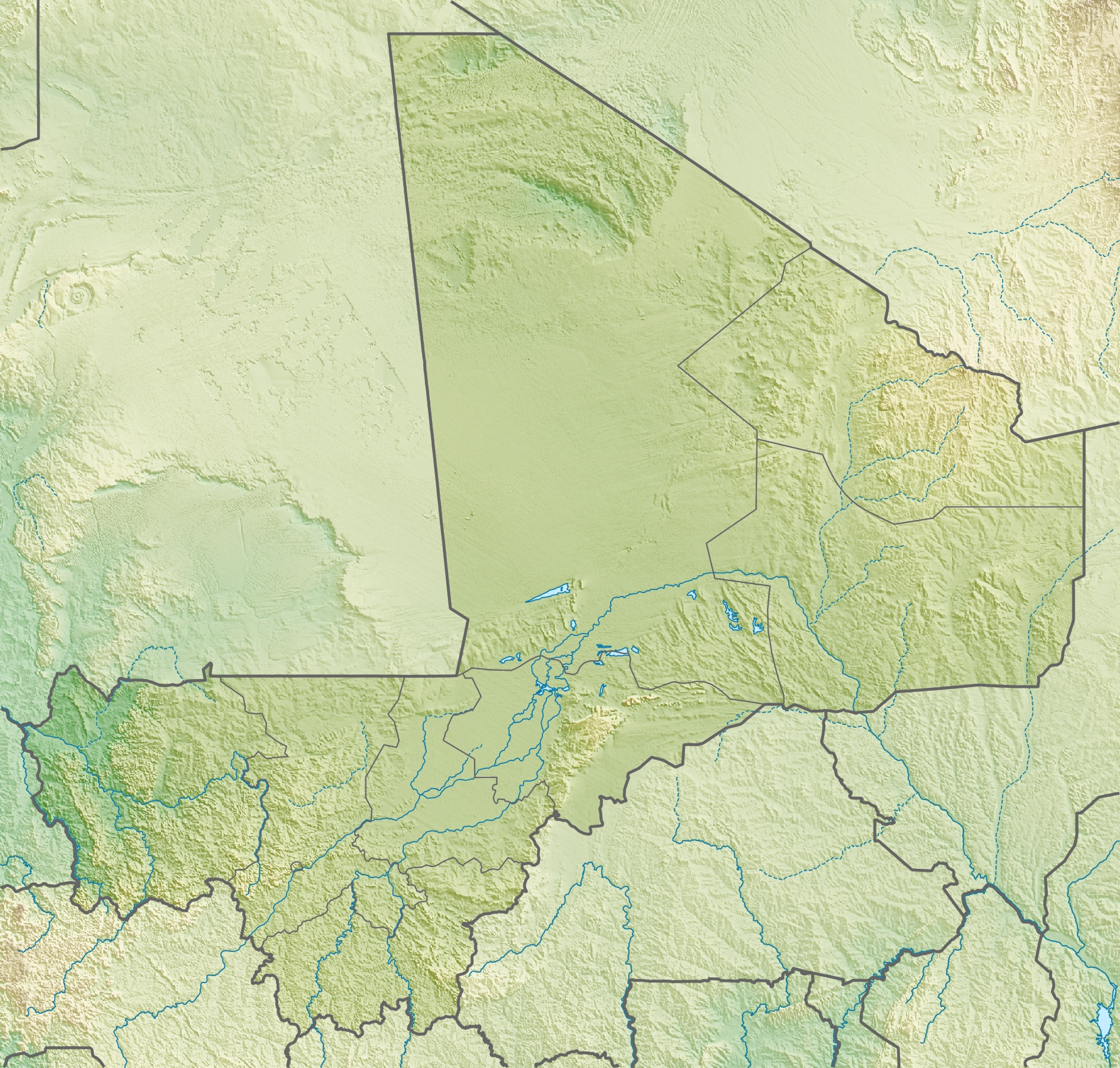
- Location within Mali

The Moura massacre was carried out by Malian Armed Forces and Russian mercenaries from the Wagner Group between 27 and 31 March 2022, in the central Malian town of Moura, Mopti Region in conflict with Al-Qaeda in the Islamic Maghreb's Jama'at Nasr al-Islam wal Muslimin. Over 300 civilians were killed according to Human Rights Watch.

== Background ==
Since January 2012, Mali has been embroiled in a civil war between Islamist insurgents and the Malian government. France joined the conflict the next year, but announced after the 2020 Malian coup d'état their intention to gradually reduce the number of French forces and withdraw them from the country. Mali has since looked for other ways to acquire foreign help, and has received help from Wagner Group, a Russian private military company which Malian and Russian forces both insisted were there to serve as military advisors only.

Human Rights Watch documented at least 71 individual cases of civilians summarily executed by security forces from December 2021 to March 2022. Islamist activities have also raised concerns, with France24 journalist Wassim Nasr suggesting the massacre was in part a retaliation for repeated attacks on the village of Dogofry, Ségou by members of the Islamist Macina Liberation Front.

The town of Moura in particular has been likened to having been under the "quasi-control" of jihadists, particularly Jama'at Nasr al-Islam wal Muslimin, which is part of Al-Qaeda in the Islamic Maghreb and has enforced sharia law on villagers. In 2022 Muhammed Kufa, AQIM's second-in-command leader, was spotted in the city.

== Massacre ==
The operation began on 27 March when government forces entered the town of Moura. Military helicopters landed near the town's market, the soldiers stepped out and approached a group of around 30 jihadists, who fired at them, killing at least two white soldiers (most likely from the Wagner Group) and an unknown number of government ones. Malian forces fired back, killing several people. Several civilians saw the scene unfold and tried to flee, but were followed by a helicopter that seemed to be deliberately firing at running civilians.

According to testimonies, Malian and white soldiers proceeded by deploying themselves across the town, blocking off exits and killing anybody who tried to escape. Security forces detained and interrogated hundreds of civilian men, often confiscating their belongings, including their telephones. Men who refused to be rounded up were shot on the spot by white mercenaries. The detainees were then sent to the river bank where they were rounded up into groups of 4, 6, or 10 and then executed en masse. Survivors told Reuters that members of the Bobo and Bellah groups were forced to dig mass graves.

Witnesses disagreed on the reasons why the men were singled out for execution, with some asserting that men wearing beards and traditional Islamic clothing were more likely to be targeted due to their similar appearances to Islamists. Others told Human Rights Watch that the people who had been executed were targeted due to their ethnic Fulani background.

The operation came to an end on 31 March. A witness told Human Rights Watch he had overheard a government officer tell someone over his walkie-talkie to "Stop killing people, let them go", and the killings stopped. At least three residents said that the military gave a speech afterwards in which they apologized for the massacre.

According to reports, around 100 white soldiers who spoke a language other than French participated in the siege. Villagers believed they were Russian mercenaries from the Wagner Group as they had heard stories about their involvement in the conflict earlier in the year. Many of these mercenaries were accused of being responsible for interrogations, torture and mass executions of civilians.

== Aftermath ==
On 1 April, the Malian government announced it had finished a nine-day military operation centred around Moura region and that over 203 terrorists had been killed.

Social media posts purporting that a massacre had taken place in the city spread rapidly in the country, sparking a controversy. On 5 April, Human Rights Watch issued a major report detailing the siege, which stated that over 300 civilians had been killed by Malian forces in what it termed the "worst single atrocity" in the history of the Mali War. (Note: This estimate is built on the conclusions of town elders. A survivor who was forced to dig mass graves counted at least 241 casualties.)

The report raised international attention, and the massacre received condemnations from the German Federal Foreign Office, France, the Center for Civilians in Conflict (CIVIC), European Union official Josep Borrell, Global Affairs Canada, and the United States Department of State.

United Nations official Alioune Tine requested for an investigation into the incident on 6 April. The Malian government opened an inquiry the next day, which was congratulated by representatives of the United Nations Multidimensional Integrated Stabilization Mission in Mali. On 20 April the United Nations expressed worries that Mali was not letting investigators enter Moura.

Christine Lambrecht, the German Minister of Defence, told reporters on 9 April she held growing doubts about her country's participation in the conflict as "the question then arises of whether this [German military intervention] can be compatible with our values, especially if we then have to witness atrocities like in Moura." Annalena Baerbock, the Minister for Foreign Affairs, voiced similar concerns.

On 8 April the Russian Foreign Ministry congratulated Mali's actions, describing reports of a massacre as "disinformation". That day, France drafted a proposal at the United Nations Security Council to investigate alleged atrocities during the battle, which was rejected by Russia and China on the grounds that it was premature to open an inquiry until Malian forces had announced one.

In late April Jama'at Nasr al-Islam wal Muslimin, or GSIM, said it had captured a Wagner Group fighter. GSIM condemned the massacre.

On 12 May 2023, the Office of the United Nations High Commissioner for Human Rights (OHCHR) published a report on the massacre that was the result of a fact-finding mission undertaken by the Human Rights Division of MINUSMA.

== See also ==
- List of massacres in Mali
- Wagner Group activities in Africa
- Hombori massacre, a massacre at a market in Mali, involving Wagner
- Aïgbado massacre, a massacre in the Central African Republic, also involving Wagner
