= Djenné Cercle =

Coordinates: 13°55′N 4°35′W

- Cercle
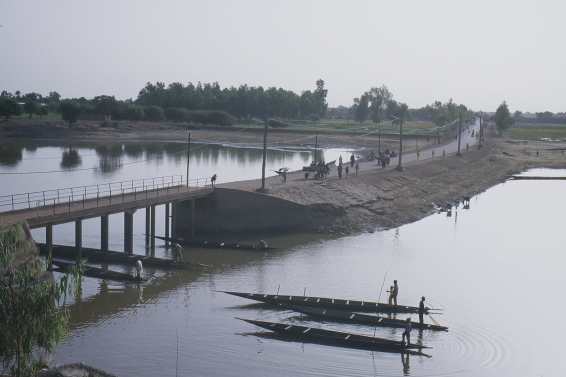

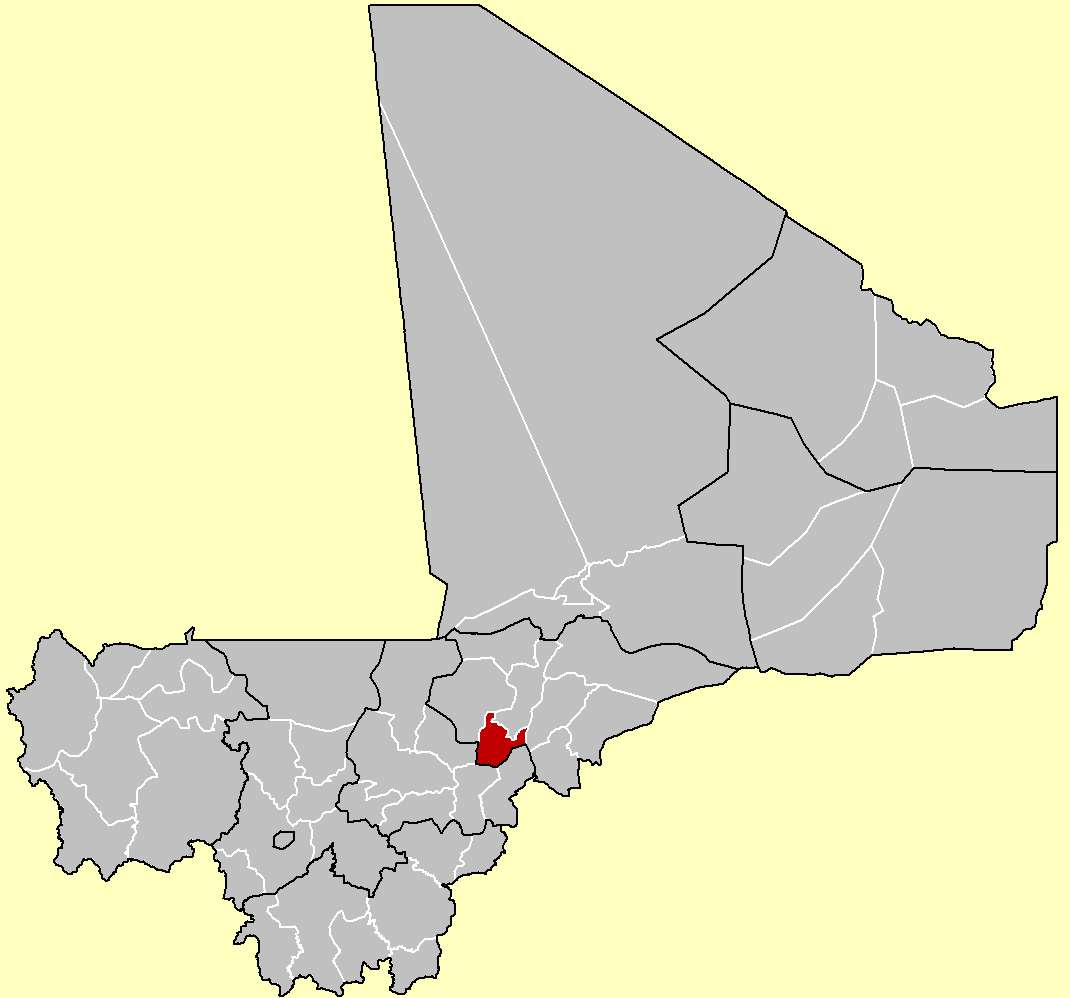
- Location of the Cercle of Djenné in Mali
- Country: Mali
- Region: Mopti Region
- Admin HQ: Djenné

Area
  - Total: 4,563 km^{2} (1,762 sq mi)

Population (2009 Census)
  - Total: 207,260
  - Density: 45.42/km^{2} (117.6/sq mi)
- Time zone: UTC+0 (GMT)

Djenné Cercle is an administrative subdivision of the Mopti Region of Mali. The administrative center (chef-lieu) is the town of Djenné. In the 2009 census the cercle had a population of 207,260 people.

== Administrative subdivisions ==
The Djenné Cercle is divided into 12 communes:

- Dandougou Fakala
- Derary
- Djenné
- Fakala
- Femaye
- Kéwa
- Madiama
- Néma Badenyakafo
- Niansanarié
- Ouro Ali
- Pondori
- Togué Mourari
