= Sailing at the 1956 Summer Olympics – 12 m2 Sharpie =

Sailing at the Olympics

12 m^{2} Sharpie at the Games of the XVI Olympiad
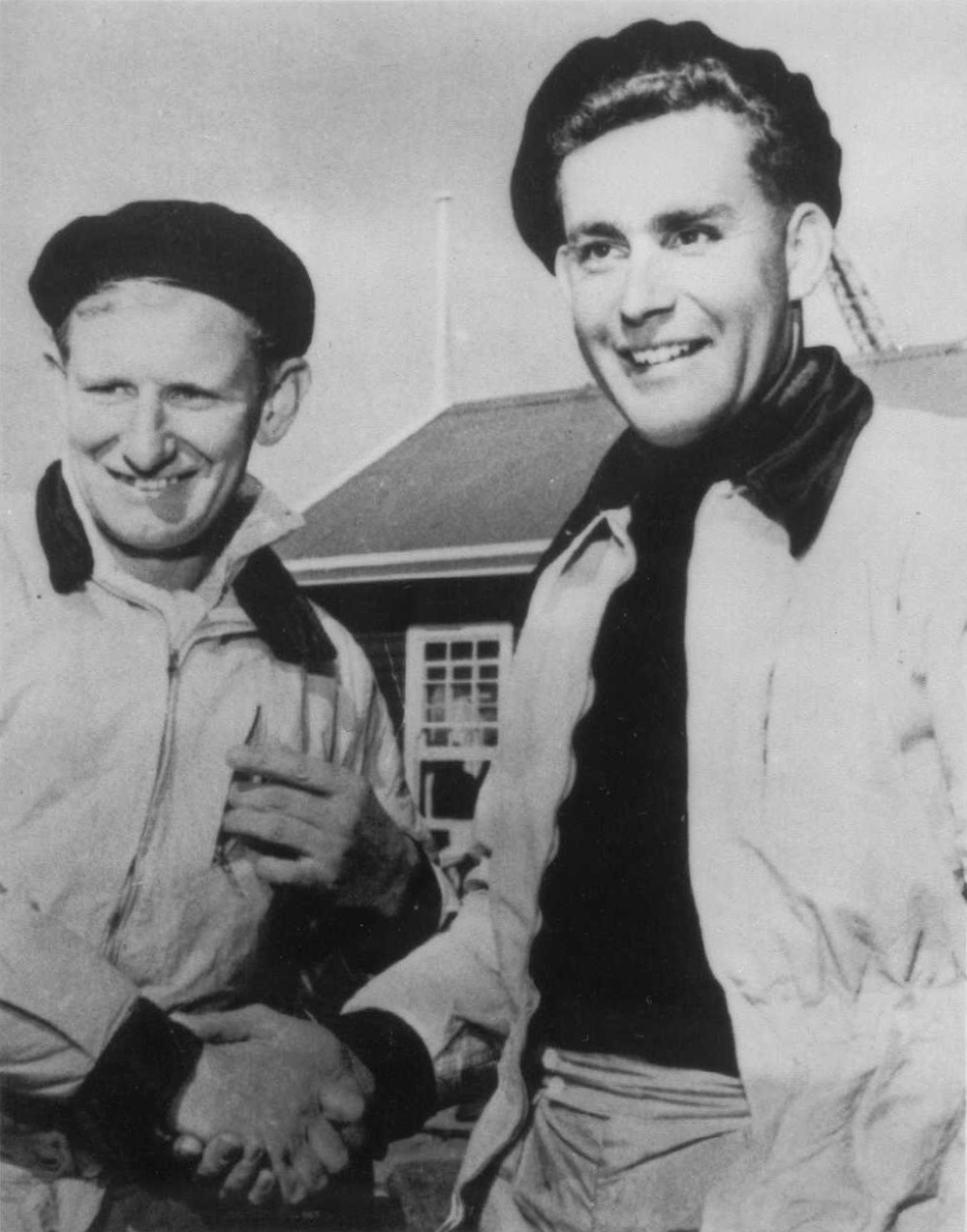
- Cropp (left) and Mander
- Venue: Port Phillip
- Dates: 26–29 November and 3–5 December
- Competitors: 26 from 13 nations
- Teams: 13

Medalists
1st place, gold medalist(s)		Peter Mander; Jack Cropp	New Zealand
2nd place, silver medalist(s)		Rolly Tasker; John Scott	Australia
3rd place, bronze medalist(s)		Jasper Blackall; Terence Smith	Great Britain

The 12 m^{2} Sharpie was a sailing event in the sailing program of the 1956 Summer Olympics, held at Port Phillip. Seven races were scheduled. Twenty-six sailors, on 13 boats, from 13 nations competed.

The races were held on a 10 nautical mile (18.5 km) course. Dutch teams dominated this class in the 1950s, but they boycotted the 1956 Olympics, protesting the Soviet invasion of Hungary. Australia initially won the final, but were demoted to second place after France argued that the Australian boat obstructed their path.

== Results ==
Rank	Helmsman (Country)	Crew	Yachtname	Race I		Race II		Race III		Race IV		Race V		Race VI		Race VII		Total Points	Total -1
Rank	Helmsman (Country)	Crew	Yachtname	Rank	Points	Rank	Points	Rank	Points	Rank	Points	Rank	Points	Rank	Points	Rank	Points	Total Points	Total -1
1st place, gold medalist(s)	Peter Mander (NZL)	Jack Cropp	Jest	2	914	1	1215	~~5~~	~~516~~	4	613	1	1215	1	1215	2	914	6602	6086
2nd place, silver medalist(s)	Rolly Tasker (AUS)	John Scott	Falcon IV.	1	1215	2	914	2	914	1	1215	2	914	2	914	~~DSQ~~	~~0~~	6086	6086
3rd place, bronze medalist(s)	Jasper Blackall (GBR)	Terence Smith	Chuckles	3	738	~~7~~	~~370~~	3	738	2	914	5	516	3	738	1	1215	5229	4859
4	Mario Capio (ITA)	Emilio Massino	Romolo	4	613	4	613	4	613	3	738	3	738	4	613	~~5~~	~~516~~	4444	3928
5	John Sully (RSA)	Alfred Evans	Impala	8	312	3	738	~~DNF~~	~~0~~	DNF	0	4	613	5	516	3	738	2917	2917
6	Rolf Mulka (EUA)	Ingo Von Bredow	Wendehals	7	370	9	261	1	1215	DNF	0	8	312	8	312	7	370	2840	2840
7	Boris Ilyin (URS)	Aleksandr Tchoumakov	Kon-Tiki	5	516	10	215	9	261	~~DNF~~	~~0~~	6	437	6	437	4	613	2479	2479
8	Roger Tiriau (FRA)	Claude Flahault	Kannibaltje	6	437	8	312	6	437	~~DNF~~	~~0~~	9	261	11	174	6	437	2058	2058
9	Eric Olsen (USA)	Stan Renehan	Tineke	~~DNF~~	~~0~~	5	516	DNF	0	5	516	7	370	10	215	8	312	1929	1929
10	Alfredo Jorge Ebling Bercht (BRA)	Rolf Bercht	Inca	~~DNF~~	~~0~~	11	174	7	370	DNF	0	11	174	7	370	9	261	1349	1349
11	Archibald Cameron (CAN)	Bill Thomas	Beaver	~~DNF~~	~~0~~	6	437	8	312	DNF	0	DSQ	0	9	261	10	215	1225	1225
12	Stylianos Bonas (GRE)	Spyros Bonas	Nikh	9	261	12	136	10	215	DNF	0	10	215	12	136	11	174	1137	1137
13	Gyi Khin Pe (BIR)	Chow Park Wing	Kingfisher	~~DNF~~	~~0~~	13	101	11	174	DNF	0	DNF	0	DNS	0	DNS	0	275	275

DNF = Did not finish, DNS= Did not start, DSQ = Disqualified
= Male, = Female

=== Daily standings ===
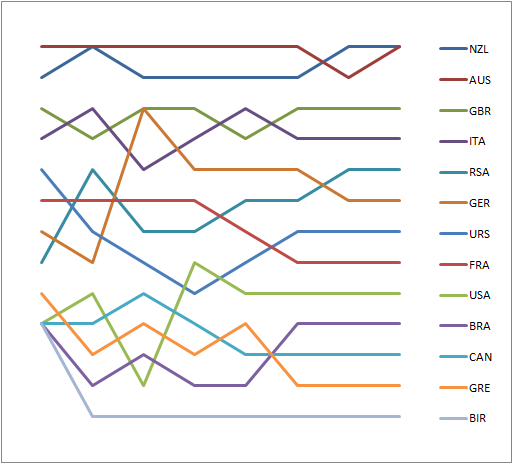
Graph showing the daily standings in the 12m^{2} Sharpie during the 1956 Summer Olympics

== Conditions at Port Phillip ==
Three race areas were needed during the Olympics at Port Phillip. Each of the classes was using the same scoring system. The northern course was used for the 12 m^{2} Sharpie.
