= 12 m2 Sharpie =

Type of Sharpie sailing boat

12 m^{2} Sharpie

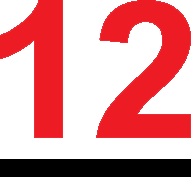

Boat
- Crew: 2
- Draft: 0.96 m (3 ft 2 in)

Hull
- Hull weight: 230 kg (510 lb)
- LOA: 5.99 m (19.7 ft)
- Beam: 1.43 m (4 ft 8 in)

Rig
- Mast height: 6.80 m (22.3 ft)

Sails
- Upwind sail area: 12.7 m^{2} (137 sq ft)

Racing
- D-PN: 109
- RYA PN: 1026

The 12 m^{2} Sharpie was a type of Sharpie sailing boat designed in 1931 by the Kröger Brothers in Warnemünde, Germany. The peak of the class was in the 1956 Melbourne Olympic Games. The original design has been preserved, and the class is sailed competitively in the UK, The Netherlands, Germany, and Portugal. The European Championships are rotated between these four countries every year.

The term 'Twelve Square Metre' evolves from the original sail area (equivalent to 129 sq ft), though on modern sharpies sail designs reach up to around sixteen square metres (equivalent to 172 sq ft).

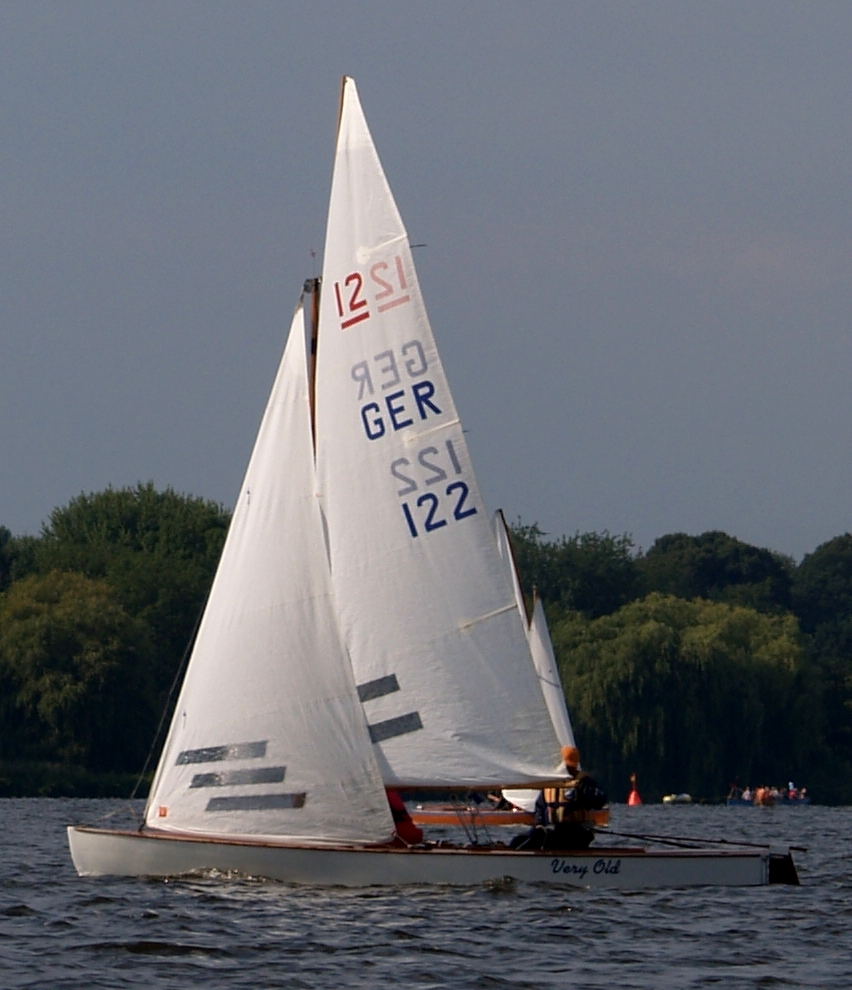
12 m^{2} Sharpie

Past Australian champions to have passed through the ranks include Sir James Hardy, John Cuneo, Rolly Tasker and John Bertrand. Rolly Tasker won Australia's first sailing medal at the 1956 Olympic Games in Melbourne when he and John Scott won a silver medal in their 12 m^{2} Sharpie.

The 12 m^{2} Sharpie is one of the Vintage classes for the 2018 Vintage Yachting Games.

There are still a few original sharpies in Australia and Brazil, though they have not been sailed competitively on International level since the 1960s. In Australia, the original 'heavyweight' Sharpie evolved into the lightweight Australian Sharpie.

When racing in a mixed fleet, the 12 m^{2} Sharpie has a Portsmouth number of 1026.

== Events ==
=== Olympics ===
Games	Gold	Silver	Bronze
1956 Melbourne details	New Zealand; Peter Mander; Jack Cropp	Australia; Rolly Tasker; John Scott	Great Britain; Jasper Blackall; Terence Smith
