= Bonas (disambiguation) =

Bonas is a commune of Gers in France.

Bonas may also refer to:

== People with the surname ==
- Antonios Bonas (1948–2018), Greek sailor
- Clive Bonas (born 1933), Venezuelan athlete
- Cressida Bonas (born 1989), British actress
- Khristos Bonas (born 1941), Greek sailor.
- Pete Bonas, member of the British metal band "Girl"
- Stelios Bonas (born 1929), Greek sailor
- Spyros Bonas (1932–2014), Greek sailor

== Other uses ==
- Bonäs, Mora, Dalama, Sweden
- Bona fides ("bonas")

== See also ==
- Albert Bonass (1911–1945), British soccer player
- Bonasse, Cedros, Siparia, Trinidad, Trinidad and Tobago
- Bona (disambiguation)
