= Bona =

Bona may refer to:

== Places ==
=== Burkina Faso ===
- Bona (Lena), Burkina Faso
- Bona (Safané), Burkina Faso

=== Senegal ===
- Bona (arrondissement), in Senegal
- Bona (Sénégal), a village

=== United States ===
- Bona, Missouri, U.S., an unincorporated community
- Mount Bona, a volcano in Alaska, U.S.

=== Elsewhere ===
- The former name of Annaba, a city in northeastern Algeria
- Bona (Hum), medieval settlement of the Principality of Hum, located in today's Blagaj, Bosnia and Herzegovina
- Bona, Nièvre, France
- Bona, Sweden, a town in Östergötland County, Sweden
- Former civil parish in Scotland, UK now part of the parish of Inverness and Bona

== Arts, entertainment, media ==
- Bona (film), a 1980 Philippine drama film directed by Lino Brocka
- Bona Magazine, a South African magazine used to be published by Caxton and now published by Habiri Media
- "Bona", a song by Sampa the Great from As Above, So Below, 2022

== Other uses ==
- Bona AB, a Swedish flooring company
- Bona Medik. 1787, a synonym of Vicia L., a genus of flowering plant
- Bona (1809 ship)
- Blue Origin New Armstrong (BO-NA), a proposed spacelaunch rocket
- Bona (name)

== See also ==
- Bona fides
- Bonas (disambiguation)
