= Stelios Bonas =

Greek sailor (born 1929)

Stelios Bonas (born 1 July 1929) is a Greek former sailor who competed in the 1956 Summer Olympics.

== Life and career ==
Stelios Bonas was the oldest of four brothers who all competed in sailing at the Olympic level, his siblings being Spyros Bonas, Antonios Bonas, and Khristos Bonas.

Bonas competed at the 1956 Summer Olympics in Melbourne, Australia. He placed twelfth in the sailing event 12m² Sharpie with his brother Spyros.

In 2020, Bonas competed in the 57th Aegean Rally, an international sailing regatta held in Greece. He placed third in the sport category and his team nominated him for a position in the Guinness World Records as the oldest amateur competition sailor.
