= Rolly Tasker =

Australian sailor (1926–2012)

Personal information
- Full name: Rolland Leslie Tasker
- Nationality: Australian
- Born: 21 March 1926
- Died: 22 June 2012 (aged 86) Perth, Western Australia
- Years active: 1953–2005
Medal record
Men's sailing
Representing Australia
Olympic Games
| Silver medal – second place | 1956 Melbourne | 12 Square meter Sharpie |

Rolland Leslie "Rolly" Tasker AM (21 March 1926 – 22 June 2012) was an Australian sailor who won Australia's first Olympic sailing medal, at the 1956 Olympic Games in Melbourne. He and Malcolm (Huck) Scott won a silver medal in their 12m^{2} Sharpie after the New Zealander Peter Mander failed to disqualify himself and Rolly had not officially protested. In 1958 Tasker won the Flying Dutchman World Championship.

From 1969 to 1985 Tasker dominated ocean racing in Western Australia with five sister yachts all called Siska. In the 1978 Sydney to Hobart Yacht Race, Siska IV was denied official starter status on a technicality. Tasker started five minutes ahead of the fleet and crossed the finish line 20 hours ahead of line honours winner Apollo. He won numerous other ocean racing events in his career including taking line honours and first place in the Queen Victoria Cup off Cowes, England. He competed in the disastrous 1979 Fastnet race, finishing third across the line. In the Parmelia Yacht Race from Plymouth to Fremantle in 1979, he finished second in the line honours race, and was the fastest yacht for each of the two legs.

Tasker was inducted into the Western Australian Hall of Champions in 1986 and the Sport Australian Hall of Fame in 1996. He became a Member of the Order of Australia in 2006 for his services to sailing.

He operated a sail-making business based in Phuket, Thailand called Rolly Tasker Sails.

In April 2008 Tasker opened the Australian Sailing Museum in Mandurah, Western Australia, with exhibits of the America's Cup races from 1851 and famous sailors from Australian sailing competitions. Twelve lifelike icons of the sailing world form part of the display, along with over 200 model yacht fleet class examples on a scale 1" to the foot.

His biography, Sailing to the Moon was published in 2008. It is written by Roland Perry and describes Tasker's extensive sailing and business activities.

In 2017, he was an inaugural inductee in the Australian Sailing Hall of Fame.
