= Jean Abraham Grill =

Swedish businessman (1736–1792)

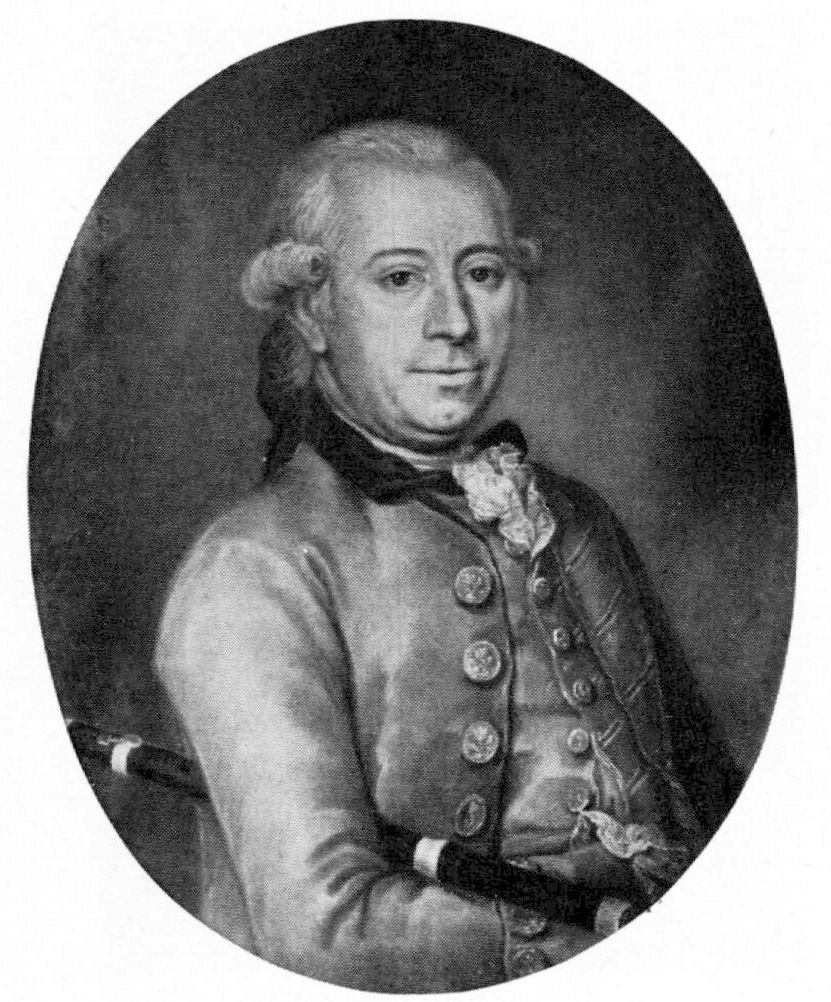
- Born: Johan Abraham Grill; 21 July 1736; Helsingør, Denmark
- Died: 12 March 1792 (aged 55); Norrköping, Sweden
- Resting place: Godegård, Sweden
- Occupations: Merchant, Supercargo; Ironworks owner
- Organization: Swedish East India Company
- Spouse: Ulrika Lovisa Lüning
- Children: Johan Abraham; Claes Anthony; Christian Ulric, Claes Loretz; Anton Volter, Gustaf; Anna Greta, Fredrik Wilhelm; Carl Jacob, Ludvig
- Parents: Abraham Grill, the Younger; Anna Maria Petersén
- Relatives: The Grill family
- Website: ostindiska.nordiskamuseet.se

Signature
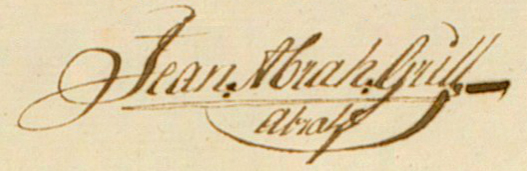

Jean Abraham Grill (21 July 1736 – 12 March 1792), sometimes called Johan Abraham Grill, was a Swedish merchant, supercargo, director of the Swedish East India Company (SOIC) and ironmaster at Godegård with several factories.

Grill journeyed to China twice as the representative for the SOIC. He lived in Canton (now known as Guangzhou) as well as Macao for a total of almost ten years, doing trade for the company during the arrival of three Swedish ships. In China he lived the life of an adventurer; survived a shipwreck, traded with other East Asian countries together with his partner Michael Grubb and smuggled opium from India to China.

He returned to Sweden in 1768, a wealthy man and lived the rest of his life in Swedish high society, writing minor essays about his travels as member of the Royal Swedish Academies of Sciences and Music. He married Lovisa Ulrika Lüning and bought the Godegård Manor and several ironworks, which he renovated and improved. When Grill died in 1792, his wife took over his business and ran the ironworks and factories.

His most notable legacy is the notes, correspondence, accounts, cargo lists and books he kept during his life. They are preserved in the Godegård Archive and in the Gothenburg University Library.

== Early life ==
One of the Grill family, Jean Abraham Grill (Note: His name was Johan Abraham Grill, but as many Swedes in the socialite at that time he used the French version of his name since that was the fashion. His father's name was Abraham so he added that fact (Abrahamsson) to his name. He wrote his name Jean Abraham Grill Abrahamsson up until 2 December 1773, when his first son Johan Abraham was born. After that he signed with J. A. Grill A. Senior.) was the eldest son of merchant Abraham Grill, the Younger (1707–68) and Anna Maria Petersen (1713–54). He was born in Helsingør where his father was the Swedish consul at that time. In 1746, the family moved to Gothenburg where his father had started a trading house. When Jean Abraham was 14 years old, he started working as an apprentice in his father's office, and three years later he became a clerk at the Swedish East India Company (SOIC). Through his father's mediation he was appointed to second assistant on the ship Sophia Albertina for its journey to Canton (now known as Guangzhou) between 1755 and 1756.

Being ambitious, Grill aimed for the higher positions in the SOIC, and to achieve that he had to learn more and gain more experience. So when he returned to Sweden from China, he decided to go abroad again as soon as possible. He started out at the trading office of Kristian Holm, Swedish consul to France, in Montpellier where he worked for about six months. He stayed in France for five years, and in 1758, he was employed by the Mallet & Blancheney firm in Marseille. Grill's letters to his family during those years indicates that he enjoyed his time in France and was interested in style and his own appearance. His initial plans had been to set up a business in Marseille, but his family, especially his uncle Claes Grill, advised against it. Claes had started out as a merchant in the European market, but he soon moved on to the more lucrative Canton trade and encouraged his nephew to do the same.

== In Canton ==
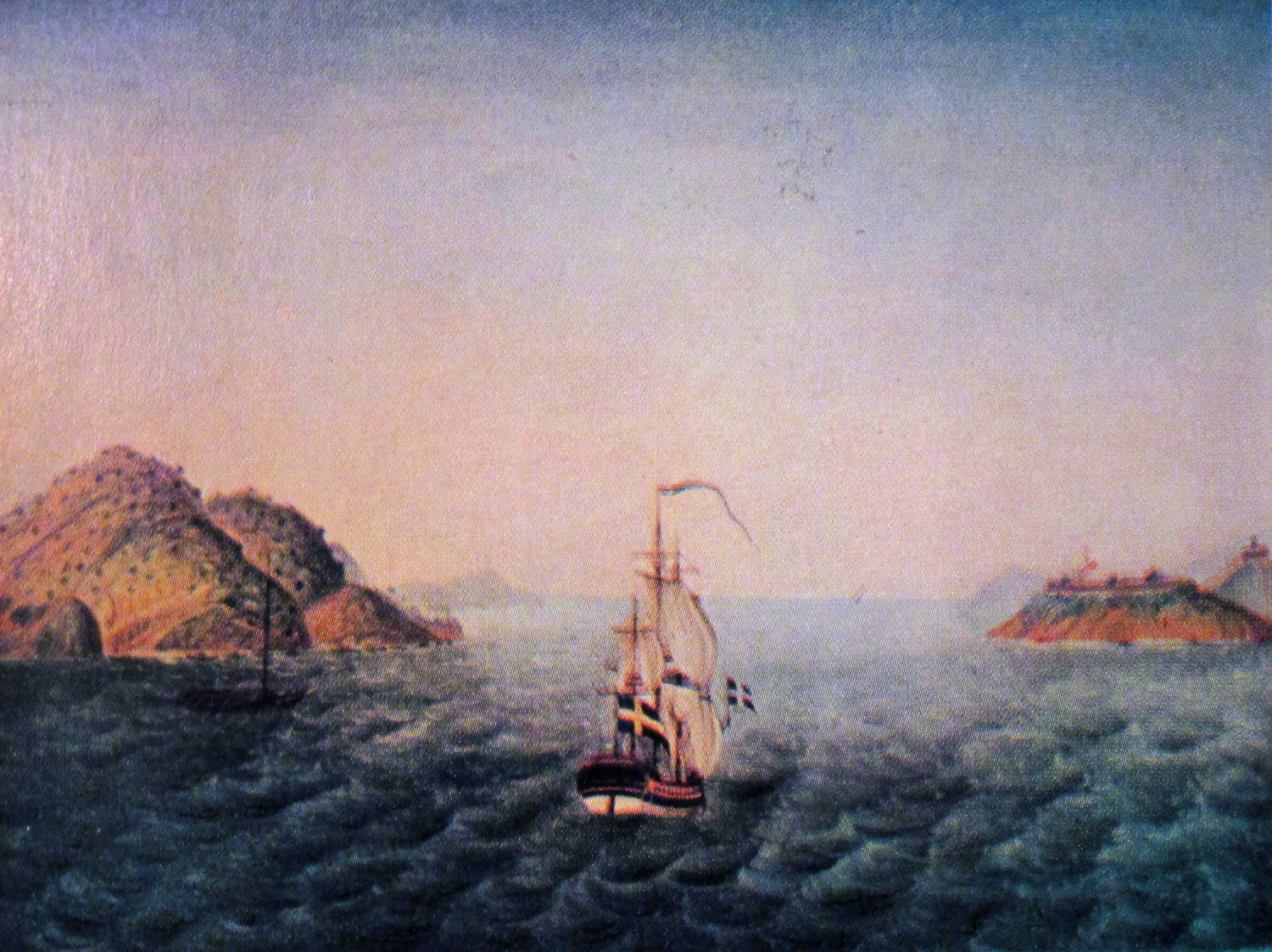
Bocca Tigris, the gate to Canton, oil painting

Grill followed his uncle Claes' advice and went to Canton as third supercargo on the Fredric Adolph in 1761, during the second carter of the SOIC. On 3 September 1761, the ship ran aground on or near Pratas Island in the South China Sea. The ship's captain, Daniel Shierman, did what he could to lighten the ship and tried to get it afloat again, but to no avail. Seven hours later the ship was a wreck, resting on the rocks and everyone aboard went into the boats. Twenty men stayed behind to guard the ship, while 122 men, including Grill, immediately set off for the nearest port. Five days later they landed on the Chinese mainland, in the "province of Catsi" [sic], (Note: Swedish 18th-century name and spelling.) where they eventually got permission from the Chinese authorities to proceed to Canton. In Canton they met with the men left to guard the ship, now 17 in number, who had arrived two weeks earlier. Three expeditions with divers, one of them led by Grill, went to recover the cargo from the wreck. They managed to salvage about two-thirds of the silver, tin, iron, coral, lead and copper from the cargo, plus one cat and a dog.

After the shipwreck, Grill remained in Canton as resident supercargo for seven years. As such he was the company's representative in Canton, contacting Chinese merchants as well as buying goods and cargo for the ships. He was supercargo for the arrival of three more ships of the SIOC: the Stockholms Slott (outward journey) in 1762, the Stockholms Slott (resident supercargo in Canton) in 1765 and the Cron Prins Gustaf (journey home) 1768. (Note: Grill was resident second supercargo for the ship on its way to China in 1762 (Stockholms Slott, 1762–1763), he stayed on in Canton and did not return with the ship. He was then resident second supercargo in Canton for the second ship (Stockholms Slott, 1765–1767). He went back to Sweden with the third ship, leaving Canton in 1768 as first supercargo (Cron Prins Gustaf, 1767–1769) and arrived in Sweden in 1769. By this time it was not necessary to travel on a ship to be supercargo for one of its journeys since the position of resident supercargo had been created.) One of his tasks in Canton was to make sure that the Swedish factory at the Thirteen Factories was in good order and maintained. The Swedes rented factories or houses from the mandarins at other locations as well, (Note: An example of this is from 1754, when two Swedish ships were due in Canton. The supercargo on the first ship, the Prins Carl rented a factory belonging to the mandarin Saoqua for 800 taels. When the second ship, the Friedric Adolph arrived, it became apparent that the house was too small and the Swedes were able to change to another bigger house, also owned by Saoqua, where the rent was 900 taels.) but the one on 13:e Faktorigatan (the 13th Factory street) (Note: The name of the area used by the Swedes.) operated as their main building. Grills records of the Swedish factory are detailed and provide good insight into life in Canton at that time.

He also started a successful private company in partnership with the older and more experienced Michael Grubb, one of the directors of the SOIC and founder of the first Swedish trading office in Canton. They traded in Canton and Macao, which technically was against the rules and regulations in the charter of the SOIC. Grill took advantage of the fact that his father was a director of the SOIC, and until his father's death shipped his own goods on board SOIC ships. From Europe the ships brought objets d'art, corals from the Mediterranean Sea, expensive clocks and other mechanical automatons known to the Chinese as sing-songs. Such goods were appreciated by the Emperor and the rich mandarins.

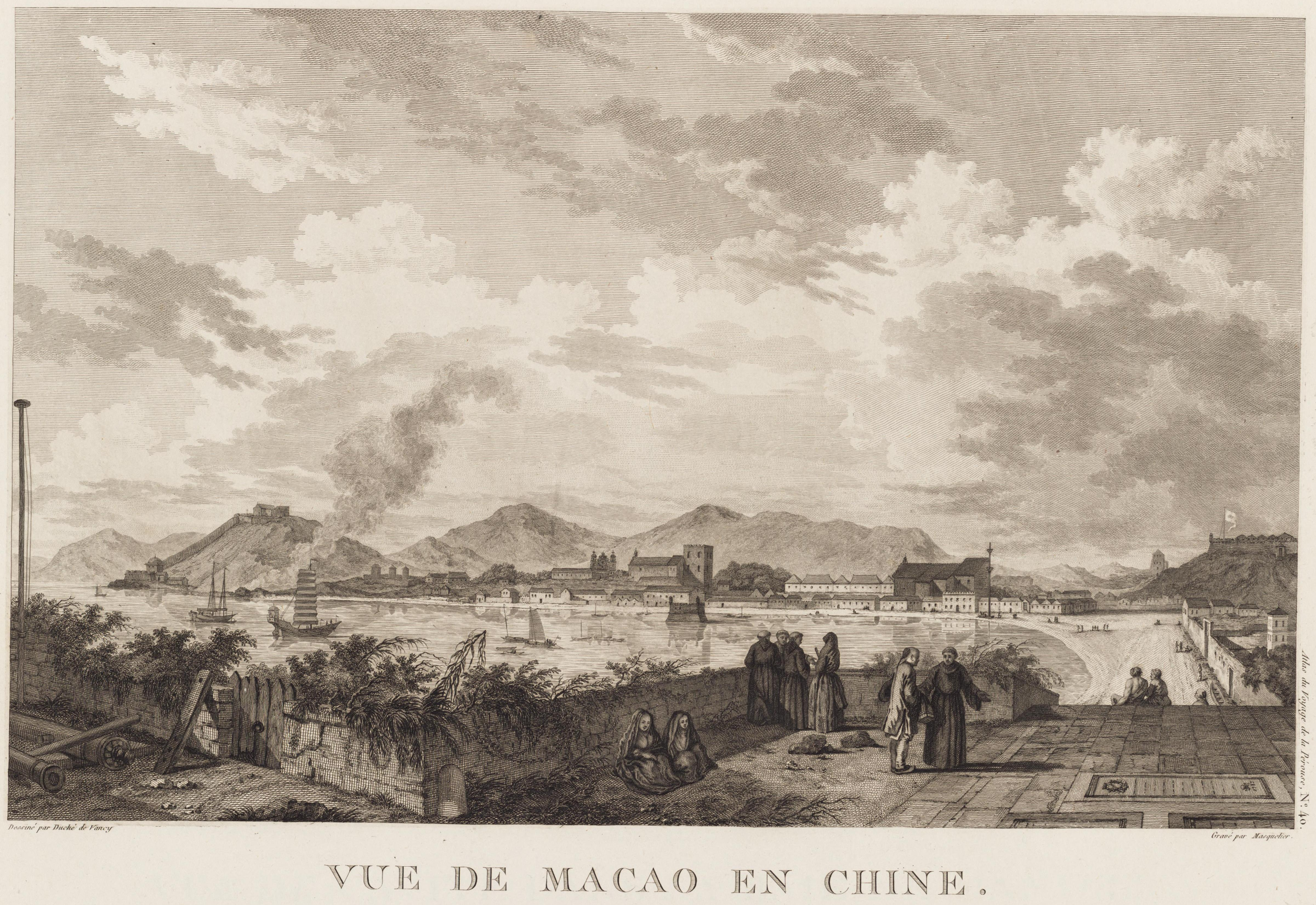
Macao harbour, 1787

The Grubb-Grill company used Chinese junks to trade with India, Java, Indochina, Philippines and Japan. From these places they traded in Japanese silk, pigments, spices, gold and silver treads, pearls and lacquerware. The most profitable product in that trade was opium, the smuggling of which became Grill's own private business. During his time in Canton he smuggled "considerable quantities" from India to Macao. It is documented that he in 1767 received a shipment of 150 chests of opium sent from Madras (now known as Chennai) by Jacob Hahr, another supercargo. Consequently, Grill became Sweden's first major drug runner.

The resident supercargo was responsible for buying goods such as tea, porcelain, silk, arrack, sago and miscellaneous for the next ship arriving from Sweden. The SOIC traded mainly with the Chinese merchant Puankhequa, who had his factory next to the Swedish, and judging from their letters, Puankhequa and Grill became friends. Grill was entrusted with funds from the SOIC for buying tea and other goods during off-season when the price was at its lowest. He bought most of the tea from Puankhequa, and several contracts are preserved. However, he did not buy the tea from the Chinese merchant on the SOIC's behalf but instead bought it through his own company and sold it on to the SOIC at a slightly higher price. After some time the SOIC became suspicious and director David Sandberg was sent to Canton to investigate the matter in 1766. Grill and his companions, Grubb and Hahr, had to sign an agreement not to misuse their position within the SOIC. In 1768, Grill was ordered to return home as supercargo on the ship Cron Prins Gustaf. Even so, Hahr stayed behind in Canton, continued their business and was able to transfer Grill's share of the profit through international bank notes.

By 1770, Grill was a partner in the Carlos & Claes Grill Trading house, and as such he became a director in the third charter of the SOIC in 1778.

== Science and music ==
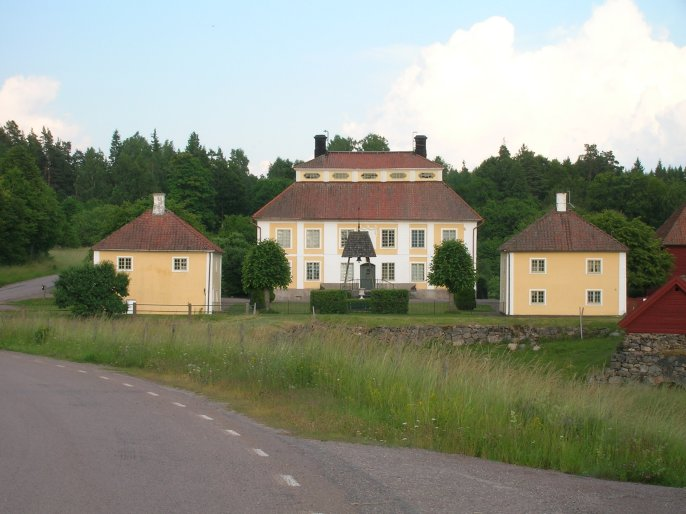
The Godegård manor.

Grill wrote a number of essays for the Royal Swedish Academy of Sciences about his observations and experiences in Canton, and in 1773, he became a member of the academy. In 1774, Grill became its preses or president. He was also an accomplished flute player, and on 16 June 1772, he was elected as member no. 46 of the Royal Swedish Academy of Music.

Grill was also interested in porcelain. Part of his orders may have been just a way to get his money transferred from China to Sweden after he was ordered to return home in 1768, but he also ordered his own armorial dinner service.

== Ironmaster and estate owner ==
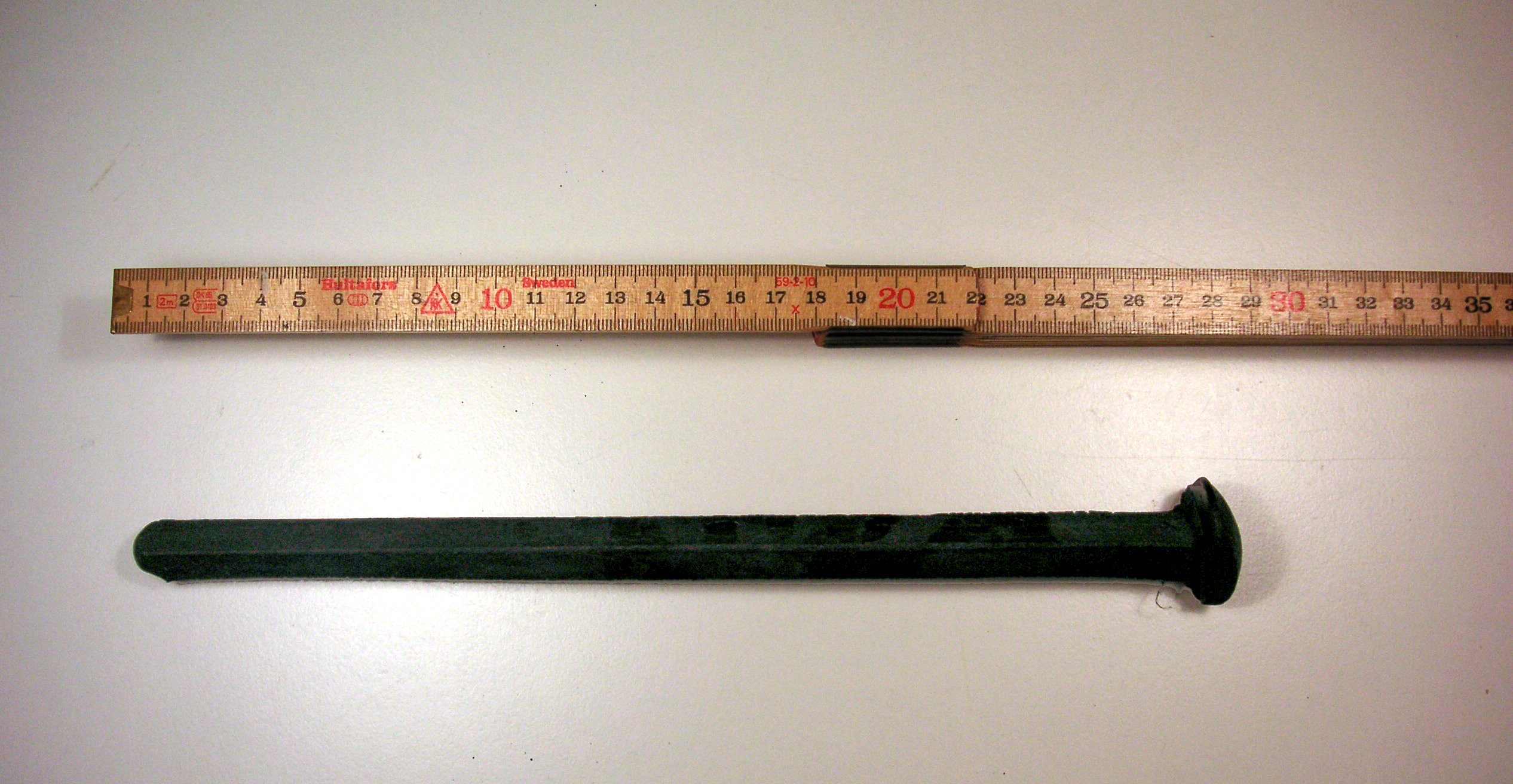
Hand wrought iron nail for the ship Götheborg III, similar to those made at Godegård

When Grill returned to Sweden in 1768, he first lived in Stockholm where he occupied himself with trade. He owned a malmgård (suburban manor) at Ersta in the south part of Stockholm, where he established a crucible steel factory with the help of Bengt Andersson Qvist in 1770.

Grill married Lovisa Ulrika Lüning (1744–1824) in Stockholm in 1772. They had ten children. She was the daughter of wholesaler Johan Christian Lüning and Margaretha Sabbath. In 1775, Grill sold the manor and the steel factory to Qvist and moved to Godegård where he had bought the manor and the ironworks from the estate of Jean de Geer. In doing so he followed the pattern of other supercargos who made their fortunes abroad during a short period of time in the East India trade and on their return invested their money in Swedish factories and farms.

Aside from renovating the factories in Godegård (the largest ironworks in Östergötland) he also had an English park planned and built at his manor in Godergård. The park had an orangery, canals, bridges and pavilions and was modelled after the larger park at Drottningholm Palace with its Chinese Pavilion. The Godegård estate also included Mariedamm with the Trehörnings blast furnace and the De Geersfors manufacturing house. Grill also bought the Bona estate in Västra Ny, where he built a wrought iron factory and the Medevi seat farm in 1779, (sold the following year). In 1782, he bought the Flerohopp ironworks.

Grill established a small scale trade monopoly at Godegård in 1775. Before he became owner of the ironworks, the farmers around Godegård had refined the wrought iron from the factory into large quantities of nails using small trip hammers. The nails were sold in Askersund. As a trader Grill would not abide this. First he decreed that the farmers had to buy all their goods at the ironworks' general store. Second, he forbade the farmers and tenant farmers to sell nails to the merchants at Askersund, at that time a center for nail trade. In this way Grill assumed control over all nail trade himself.

Jean Abraham Grill died on 12 March 1792, in Norrköping under "mysterious circumstances" and was interred in the Grill family grave at the Godegård Church. When Grill died, his wife Lovisa Ulrika took over and ran the ironworks and factories until their children succeeded her.

== Archives ==
Throughout his life Grill kept meticulous notes of his business. Some of these are in the Gothenburg University library, and most of them, along with Grill's letters and correspondence, are now in the Godegård Archive in the Nordic Museum. Most of the 7,000 documents in the archive have been digitized following a request from the Macau Historical Archives in 2003. They are available online, including documentation, letters, cargo lists, provisions for the ships and accounts for the Swedish factory in Canton during Grill's time with the SOIC.
