= Graham Mander =

New Zealand sailor (1931–2021)

Personal information
- Full name: Graham Mander
- Born: 30 June 1931 Christchurch, New Zealand
- Died: 6 May 2021 (aged 89) Christchurch, New Zealand

Graham Mander (30 June 1931 – 6 May 2021) was a New Zealand yachtsman from Christchurch. At the 1968 Summer Olympics in Mexico he was the reserve Flying Dutchman skipper for New Zealand.

He was born in Christchurch to Stanley and Nina Mander, and was a younger brother of yachtsman Peter Mander.

He started yachting in P class yachts, and was the first yachtsman to win the four main class national titles including the Saunders Cup three times. As skipper he won 13 national titles over 20 years including four Leander Trophy successes. With Peter they established the Olympic 470 class in Canterbury. He was a life member of the Christchurch Yacht Club and an honorary member of the Mt Pleasant Yacht Club. He spent "countless hours" on yacht design and construction, many in his home shed.

He was educated at St Andrew's College, Christchurch. He married June Roskilley in 1957; they had three children Christine, Jacqui (deceased) and John. He retired in 1988 after 40 years with the Union Steam Ship Company of New Zealand; he was a stevedoring accountant at Lyttelton.
