= Australian Sharpie =

Type of sailing dinghy

Boat
- Crew: 3

Hull
- LOA: 19 ft (5.8 m)

The Australian Sharpie is a 3-person sailing dinghy which has evolved from the 12-square-metre class sailed in the 1956 Olympics in Melbourne, Australia. Australian Sharpies are 19 feet, 11 3/4 inches long, with a planing hull and a single mast. Sharpies race with a fully battened mainsail, a jib and a spinnaker. They are sailed competitively in all six Australian states. The Australian Sharpie National Titles is run as a carnival each year rotating from state to state. A National Conference is held each year during this event by officials from the Australian Sharpie Sailing Association (ASSA).

Famous Sharpie sailors include 1983 America's Cup winner John Bertrand, Sir James Hardy and John Cuneo.

== Development ==
Heavyweight Sharpie, 12-square-metre class sailed in the 1956 Olympics

Development of the Australian Sharpie is strictly controlled by the Australian Sharpie Sailing Association (ASSA), which has chapters in each of the states which have Sharpie fleets. The current craft was initially referred to as a "Lightweight Sharpie". to distinguish it from an earlier design which was referred to as a "Heavyweight Sharpie"; however, at a recent national conference the name was officially changed to "Australian Sharpie". The Lightweight Sharpie was founded by the Addison brothers in Western Australia.

Because of the design, the type has limitations that prevent mass-production in fiberglass. Fiberglass, by its nature, is stronger when used for compound curves; the flat bottom and sides of a sharpie are not well suited to this building material. Some designers, including Bruce Kirby and Reuel Parker, have managed to add some curves (typically at the chine) without compromising the qualities of the type, but there are limits as to what can be done before the boat becomes something other than a sharpie.

The earlier heavyweight Sharpie is still sailed with fleets in the UK, Holland, Germany, and Portugal.

== The Australian Sharpie Sailing Association ==
The association consists of representatives from each state with an active sailing Sharpie fleet. Office bearers in the association include an:

- Australian Commodore
- Australian President
- Australian Measurer
- Australian Secretary
- Carnival Secretary
- Regatta Technical Advisor
- Australian Regatta Secretary
- Australian Publicity Officer

Each state division (chapter) of the association also has its own office bearers, typically including a President, Measurer, Secretary, Race Officer and Publicity Officer.

== The Annual Carnival and National Titles ==
The Carnival is held annually in consecutive states in the following order:

- South Australia
- Western Australia
- New South Wales
- Tasmania
- Victoria
- Queensland

The National Titles trophy consists of 7 races. These races are preceded by two invitation races.

=== National Awards ===
A number of perpetual trophies are presented at the end of the annual carnival. These include the following:

- Australian Champion (Addison Brothers Trophy, Sir Dallas Brooks Trophy, Geoff Augustine Memorial Trophy)
- Runner-up Australian Champion (Alcorso Trophy)
- Third Place Champion (Fred Meyer Memorial Trophy)
- Fourth Place Champion (Phil Durham Memorial Trophy)
- Overall Consistency Champion (The O'Grady Cup)
- Best Junior Skipper (Tomlinson Trophy)
- Most Carnival Wins (Mark Peelgrane Memorial Trophy)
- Best Country Representative (Red Hand Trophy)
- First Non-State Team Competitor (Don Shields Perpetual Trophy)
- Overall Consistency on Handicap (Westpac Bank Trophy)
- Open Invitation Events (Ray Callard Trophy)
- First Non-State Team Competitor Handicap (George Laurens Trophy)
- Golden Oldies (Golden Oldies Trophy)
- First skipper over 50 (Erky Mitton Trophy)
- First female skipper (Graham Keys Trophy)
- Champion Team (Bishop Teams Trophy)
- First Handicap Champion (Bretts Handicap Trophy)
- Chug-a-lug
