= Force (cereal) =

Early American breakfast cereal

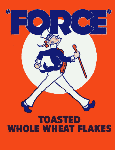
- Early Force packaging featuring Sunny Jim
- Type: Cereal
- Course: Breakfast
- Place of origin: United States
- Created by: Force Food Company
- Invented: 1901; 125 years ago
- Serving temperature: Cold
- Main ingredients: Wheat

Force was the first commercially successful wheat flake breakfast cereal. Prior to this, the only successful wheat-based cereal products had been Shredded Wheat and the hot semolina cereal, Cream of Wheat. The product was cheap to produce and kept well on store shelves. First produced in 1901 by the Force Food Company in Buffalo, New York, it was one of three companies owned by Edward Ellsworth and advertised using a popular cartoon figure called Sunny Jim.

== History ==
The first advertising copy for the new product described the cereal as "The Food That is all Food", the advertising images showed rosy-cheeked children, and it was sold in a box decorated with images of muscular men wrestling with chains. Perhaps because it was not initially targeted at a well-defined market, it did not sell well.

In late 1901 Minnie Maud Hanff, a freelance jingle writer, invented the character Jimmy Dumps, a morose character who on eating the cereal was transformed into Sunny Jim. Illustrator Dorothy Ficken (the mother of Fred Gwynne) produced line drawings, and Hanff produced lighthearted jingles describing Sunny Jim's transformation. The advertising appeared in magazines, on billboards, and on the sides of urban trolley cars from May 1902 through to the fall.

The campaign was wildly successful. Force was originally produced in a single plant in Buffalo, but by early 1904 the Canadian Grocer reported that there was one more Force food mill in Buffalo, a third mill in Chicago and one in Hamilton, Ontario, producing a total of 360,000 packages per day. Ellsworth overextended and lost control of his companies in 1907. Thereafter Force cereal changed ownership frequently in the United States, following a convoluted path involving many corporate mergers. The last owner stopped producing the cereal in 1983.

In 1940, Force sponsored The Adventures of Superman, a radio show which introduced key concepts to Superman like Kryptonite.

== British subsidiary ==
In 1903 a British subsidiary of the Force Food Company was formed to import the cereal to Europe. A slightly modified version of Sunny Jim and his jingles caught the fancy of British consumers. A. C. Fincken, a former employee of the Force Food Company, set up an agency in 1910 to import American cereals to the UK. The cereal, and the Sunny Jim character achieved wide success in Britain, at its peak in 1930 selling 12.5 million packages. In 1932 the cereal was reintroduced into the United States by Herbert C. Rice, an Englishman involved in radio production in Buffalo. He introduced The H-Bar-O Rangers, a popular radio adventure serial for boys involving another permutation of the Sunny Jim character, and linked to an advertising campaign for the cereal. It didn't last.

Since 1954 the cereal was manufactured in the UK for domestic sale. A.C. Fincken & Co., Ltd. was sold to Rank Hovis McDougall, a subsidiary of the Nestle Company, in 1985. An unusual marketing campaign in the 1970s was focussed on the Ravenglass and Eskdale Railway: perhaps successful, but exposed to a very narrow market. A pre decimal coin collection was available with all 10 coins of ER2 including the farthing, circa 1986-88.

Manufacture of Force cereal ceased in 2013,< the reason cited being poor sales, although in the last few years of production the cereal had been difficult to find due to having very few retail outlets, latterly only Sainsbury's, Waitrose and Ocado. The Sunny Jim mascot continued to be used in the United Kingdom until the cereal's discontinuation.

Since then, the Force wheat flakes brand was revived for UK consumers, and was acquired by Nestlé. It was, but is no longer, for sale on the Waitrose website.

=== Sunny Jim ===
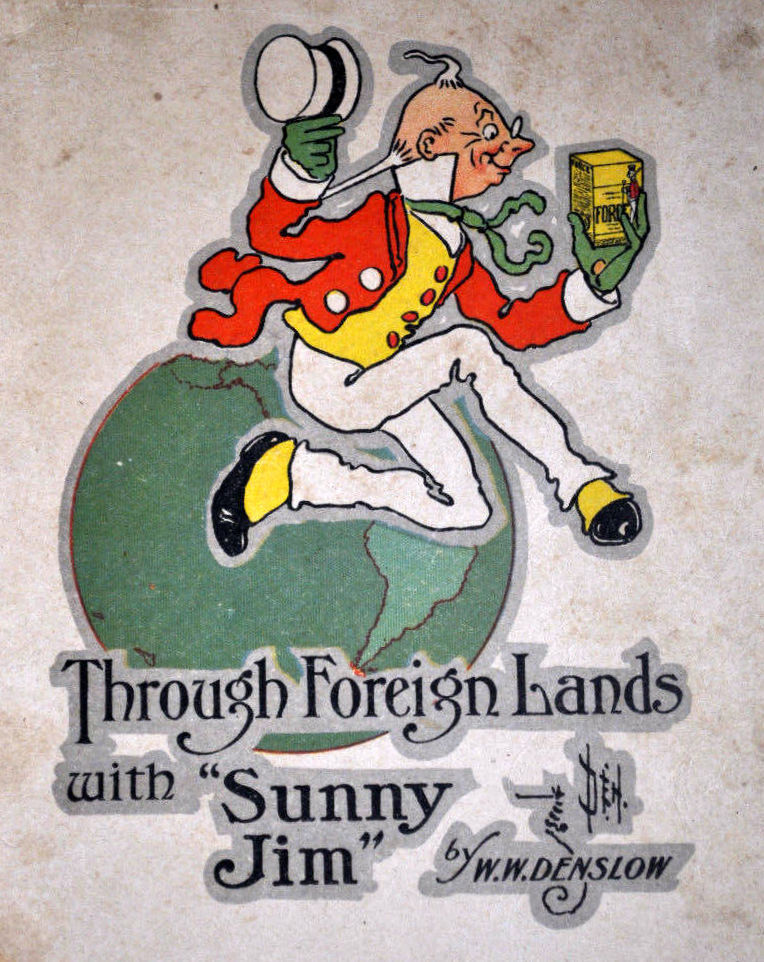
1910 advertising booklet by W. W. Denslow

The character on boxes of Force cereal was created in the United States in 1902 by writer Minnie Maud Hanff and illustrator Dorothy Ficken (the mother of Fred Gwynne), initially for an advertising campaign. Rather than selling the benefits of eating wheat, which Hanff assumed customers already knew, her copy for the original advertisements told stories in verse, such as this one:

Jim Dumps was a most unfriendly man,
Who lived his life on the hermit plan;
In his gloomy way he'd gone through life,
And made the most of woe and strife;
Till Force one day was served to him
Since then they've called him "Sunny Jim."

The advertisements featured slogans such as "Better than a Vacation" and "A Different Food for Indifferent Appetites." Other verses included:

Whatever you say, wherever you've been,
You can't beat the cereal, that raised Sunny Jim!

and

High o'er the fence leaps Sunny Jim,
Force is the food that raises him

This last rhyme became a familiar catchphrase.

Also used was the slogan "When skies are grey and times are grim, wake up and smile with Sunny Jim", which appeared on advertising coins.

The campaign was wildly successful at promoting the character of Sunny Jim. Printers' Ink stated September 17, 1902 that "No current novel or play is so universally popular. He is as well-known as President Roosevelt or J. Pierpont Morgan." However, the cereal company turned its advertising account over to a different firm, which did not approve of humor in advertising and more or less abandoned the campaign.

G.K. Chesterton refers to Sunny Jim in the first paragraph of his 1911 Father Brown mystery, "The Three Tools of Death," the final short story in The Innocence of Father Brown.

The Sunny Jim wheat flakes character is referenced in the lyrics to the song 1000 Umbrellas by XTC on the Skylarking album.
