= Wilhelm Edner =

Swedish businessman and writer

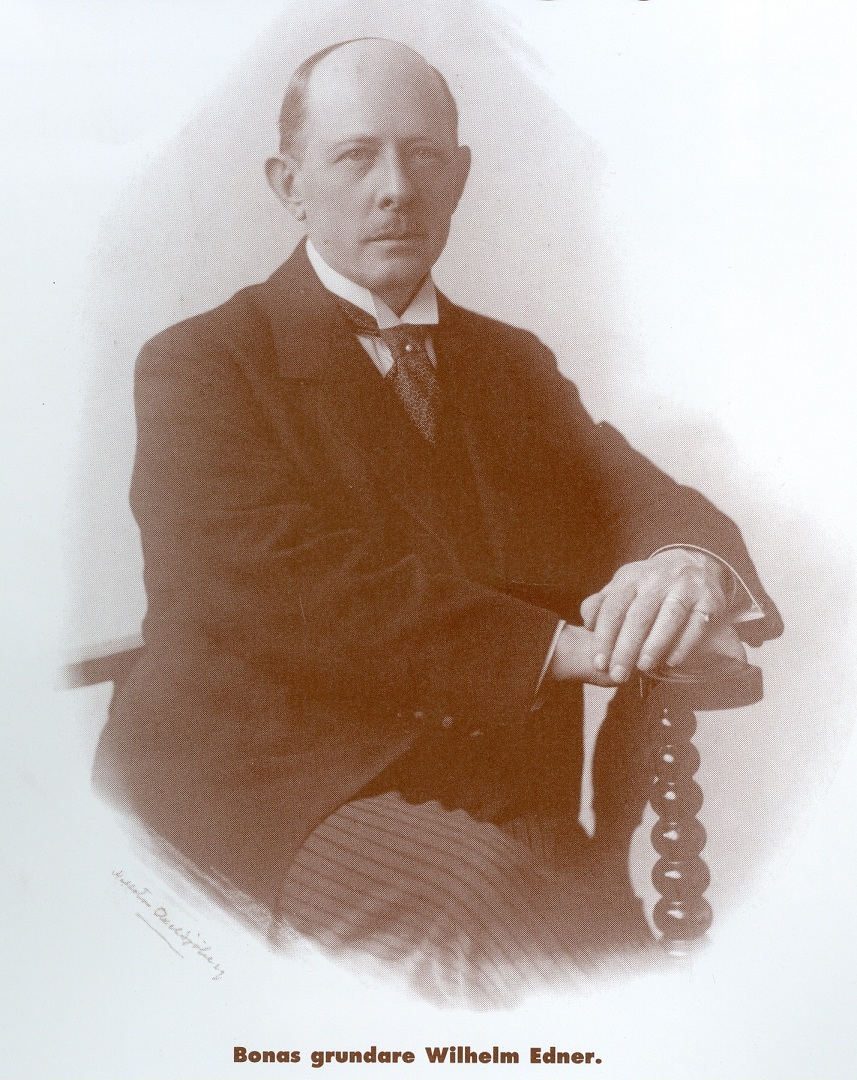
Wilhelm Edner

Wilhelm Edner (born 1868, date of death unknown) was a Swedish businessman and writer.

Edner was born in Malmö, Sweden. In 1894, he opened a grocery store in Malmö where he sold coffee. In 1910s, he began selling a floor wax, called bonvax, in the grocery store, which had never been sold in the Swedish market before.

When Edner realized the potential of bonvax, in 1919, he founded the company Bona AB, which specialized in wood protection.
