= Boris Ilyin =

Soviet sailor

Personal information
- Nationality: Soviet
- Born: 1930 (age 94–95)

Sport
- Sport: Sailing

Boris Ilyin (born 1930) is a Soviet sailor. He competed in the 12m² Sharpie event at the 1956 Summer Olympics.
