= Puankhequa =

Chinese merchant

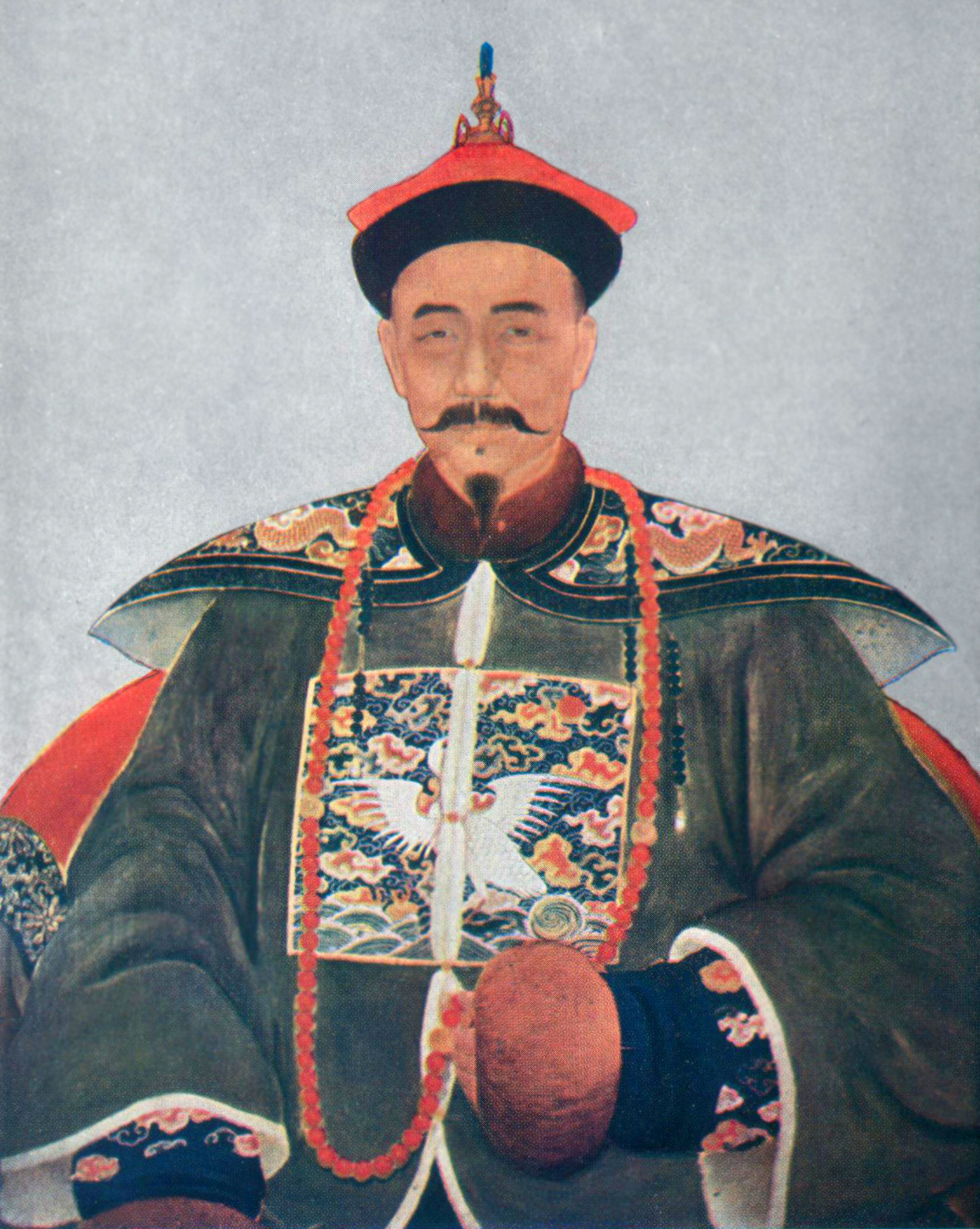
- Portrait, oil painting on a mirror, made in the 1700s by an unknown Chinese painter. In the collection of the Museum of Gothenburg.
- Born: Pan Wenyan; 1714; Fujian China
- Died: 10 January 1788 (age 74); Canton, China
- Resting place: Futing, Quanzhou
- Occupation: Merchant
- Known for: Notable mandarin in Canton
- Children: (Known) seven sons
- Parent: P'u-chai (father)

Puankhequa (Chinese: 潘啟官; pinyin: Pān Qǐguān; 1714 – 10 January 1788), also known as Pan Wenyan, or Zhencheng, (Note: In documents relating to the Swedish East India Company, his name is spelled Poankeyqua or Phuankhequa I. In sources the spelling of his name varies as: Poankeyqua, Poan Key-qua, Pon-key-qua, Pankeequa, Pan Qiguan, Pan Chencheng, Pan Ki-Kvan, Ketqua or Khequa.) was a Chinese merchant and member of a cohong family, which traded with the Europeans in Canton (now known as Guangzhou) during the Qing dynasty (1644–1912). He owned a factory in the Thirteen Factories district where his firm was favored by the English, Swedes, "Imperials" (Note: Traders under the Imperial East India Company established by British and other privateers with a charter from the Holy Roman Emperor.) and Danes.

== Biography ==
Puankhequa's family originated from a poor fishing village near Zhangzhou, Fujian. By the time he was born, his father had relocated the family to Guangdong. Puankhequa had seven sons, two of whom were engaged in trade and providing market intelligence about tea and silk for the Canton firm from other parts of China and Japan. A third son, Pan Chih-hsiang, would later succeed his father as head of the firm, thus inheriting his father's business name and becoming Puankhequa II. As a young man in search of fortune, Puankhequa travelled by junks around Southeast Asia, going as far as Manila.

According to Liang Chia-pin and Louise Dermigny, Puankhequa was involved in the Canton trade by the late 1730s. As a young man he learned to speak, read and write Spanish and had some skills in pidgin English, which facilitated trading with Europeans. His ability to deliver goods and his skills in developing special, long-term relationships with foreigners and officials attracted and retained the custom of foreign traders, which contributed to his success.

In a portrait of Puankhequa in the Museum of Gothenburg, he displays the attributes of a wealthy mandarin: hat-pin, necklace and the mandarin square on his surcoat. According to professor Jan Wirgin it is a "...robe of a third rank mandarin, with a sapphire hat-pin in his hat. He achieved this rank around 1780." He had bought a title and was raised to the third class of the mandarinate for his contributions to a military campaign.

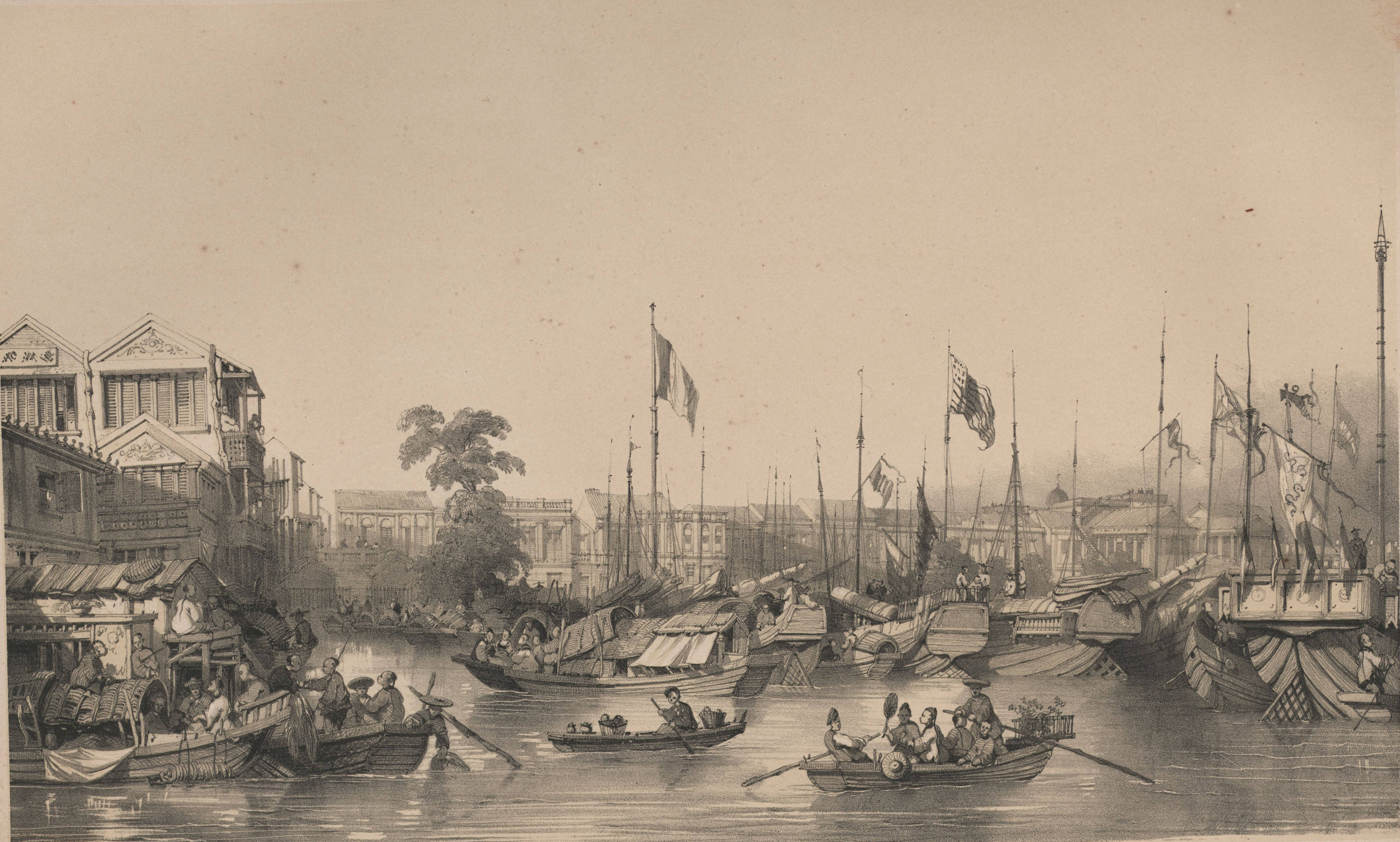
Boats on the river outside the European factories, 1838

Puankhequa enjoyed trading and spent most of his waking time doing business. He lived in a mansion, "Jiulong" (named after the Jiulong River of his ancestral city), on the south bank of the Pearl River near Honam Island (the modern day Haizhu District of Guangzhou). To save as much time as possible for business, he ate on the boat taking him to and from work. In promoting his business, he had no scruples when it came to manipulating officials or bribing the "Hoppo" (The Guangdong Customs Supervisor) and passing the costs on to the Europeans.

Puankhequa died on 10 January 1788, and was interred in the foothills of Futing near his county seat in Quanzhou.

== Trading ==
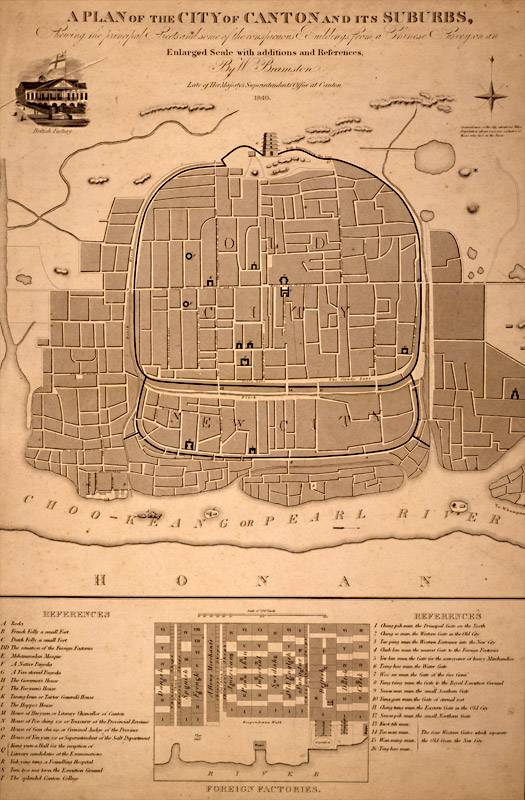
British map of Canton made in 1840, six years after the trade ceased

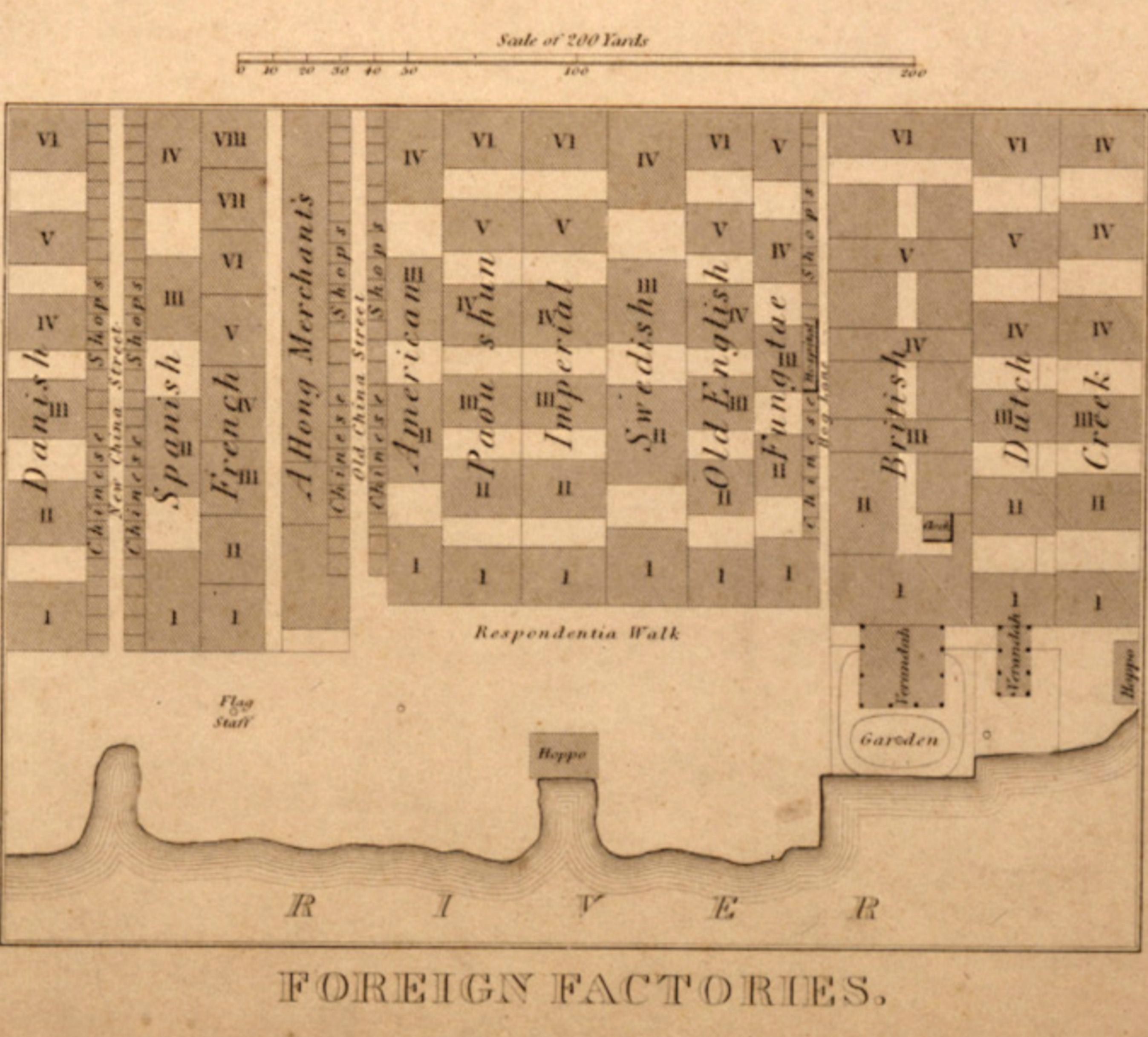
Close-up of the foreign factories.

=== 1760 to 1788 ===
Puankhequa was Chief Merchant in Canton between 1760 and 1788. He had made his name in the silk trade, but traded in a number of other goods. From the 1740s to 1760, Puankhequa traded out of the Dafeng Hang (達豐行), which he managed in partnership with his Chen family accomplices and his brother Seequa (潘瑟官). All of his trade with foreigners in Canton at this time, and his trade with Southeast Asia via the Chinese junks, was conducted out of the Dafeng Hang. In 1760, Puankhequa established a new firm called the Tongwen Hang (同文行), which in the 1810s was renamed Tongfu Hang (同孚行). Although ruthless in business, Puankhequa remained sentimental about his family's origin and his Fujianese identity. He founded the Fujian mai-ch'iao, the Fujianese merchants in temporary residence in Canton, an association for business and social events.

The firm owned a factory which was situated close to the Swedish factory. The Swedes joined in the East India trade later than most of the national European trading companies. The first ship arrived in September 1732. They were seen as naïve by the rest of the European traders and Puankhequa treated them haughtily, but they nevertheless regarded him as a friend and benefactor. Mostly they bought tea from him. The tasting of different lots and negotiations about the price usually went on for weeks. He also served as a mediator when this was called for; in 1761, he was asked by the captain on one of the Swedish ships to help out in a conflict with some Dutch merchants. The Dutch had set up a punsch tent in Huangpu near the ships and the captain had trouble keeping his crew away from the place. Puankhequa managed to get the mandarins in Huangpu to forbid the selling of alcohol on land while the ships were there. In September 1768, the Swedes made an unsuccessful attempt at selling Swedish woolen cloth and camlet to the Chinese traders. The cloth was deemed too coarse and nobody wanted to buy it, except for Puankhequa who gave the Swedes a fair price.

Some Swedish supercargos stayed in Canton for several years, one of them was Jean Abraham Grill who became friends with Puankhequa and made several profitable deals with him when buying tea. The usual order of business was that trade began as soon as the ships came to Canton. When the ships docked, the price of tea, silk and all the other coveted goods, immediately began to rise, and as soon as the ships left, prices started to fall again. Grill would buy tea privately from Puankhequa when the price was at its lowest and sell the tea to his employer, the Swedish East India Company, at a slightly higher price when the next ship came in. Thus, Puankhequa was able to do business during the off-season and Grill could net himself a profit at his employer's expense. Several contracts for this trade between Puankhequa and Grill are kept in the Gothenburg University Library.

At first, the English were wary of Puankhequa because of his many schemes and debts, but in the 1780s they started to accept him and talked about him as "a merchant the most to be depended on". They still kept their options open, nevertheless, through dealings with other merchants. The French admired Puankhequa's ability to control officials and pay bribes in the right places at the right times, but they also saw him as seductive, devious and, according to one French merchant, in possession of "the most evil soul ever to have inhabited a human body". Few foreigners could trade in Canton without having to make deals with him at some point.

In order to facilitate trade Puankhequa would on occasion give informal dinners for foreign traders at his country house. These dinners lasted a couple of days, with one day being dedicated to Chinese culture and the next à la mode Anglaise [sic] (in an English style). There were also humorous plays about the two cultures and guests could choose whether they wanted to use chopsticks or cutlery.

== 1790s to 1810s ==
By 1798, most of the hong firms established before 1790 had folded, except that of Puankhequa II, who had succeeded his father as head of the firm. By then it was the most prosperous house and Puankhe clan had become the wealthiest merchant in Canton.

A year later, all the European firms had left Canton, except for the Swedes (who left in 1831) and the Spaniards (in 1834). Puankhequa II retained the Swedes as clients until the Swedish East India Company folded in 1813.

By the time the Hong merchants disbanded in 1834, Puankhequa II's firm had become the longest-surviving of them all. Thereafter, the family diversified their commercial interests in foreign countries. As globalization grew, the significance of the Cantonese family became less concentrated compared to previous centuries. Members of the Puankhe clan, migrated to Hong Kong while others moved to Canada, United States, and Europe.

== Botanical specimens ==
In 1806, Puankhequa II was in correspondence with Sir Joseph Banks who thanked him for botanical specimens he had supplied for Kew Gardens. In return, Banks sent him other plants which he thought would be useful in China.

== Sweden ==
According to tradition and numerous sources, Puankhequa made the journey to Sweden and stayed or lived in Gothenburg for some time at the invitation of Niclas Sahlgren, but further research in 2007 by LarsOlof Lööf (Note: LarsOlof Lööf was intendant at the Museum of Gothenburg, specializing in managing the archives.) disproved this and concluded that Puankhequa never visited Sweden. He gave a portrait of himself to Sahlgren, an oil painting on a mirror. The painting is now in the collection of the Museum of Gothenburg. The documentation regarding the painting mentions him as personal friend of Sahlgren and adviser to the Swedish East India Company. Puankhequa is also depicted in a big mural in the museum (formerly the East India House) where he is seen negotiating with Swedish merchants on the shore of the Pearl River. The first recorded visit by a Chinese to Sweden was made by the merchant and linguist (translator) for the Swedish East India Company, Choi A-fuk (or Afock), in 1786.

== Legacy ==
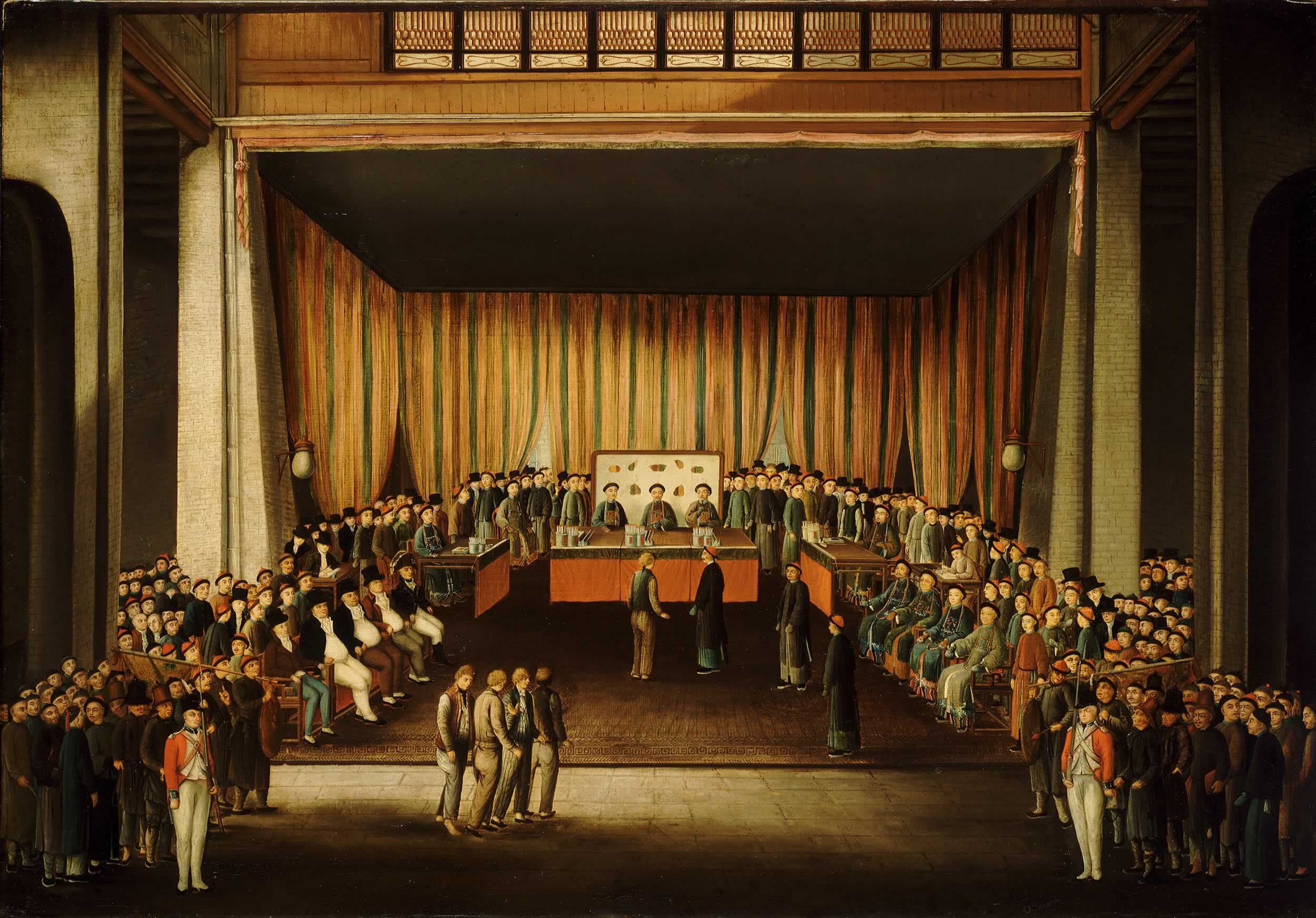
Four British seamen on trial. Puankhequa II is one of the four Chinese merchants seated on the right

The mansion where Puankhequa lived in the Haizhu District of Guangzhou has been recognised as important. The Chinese government planned in 2011 to renovate the 200 hectares (2.0 km^{2}) site and make it available as a tourist attraction. Over the years it has been divided and sub-divided into spaces for both business, manufacturing and living. The government plan to restore the interior and renovate the wooden carvings and the faded paintings which are still extant.

Puankhequa II was included in an 1807 painting of a joint British and Chinese court, which was set up in October 1807, to try English sailors who had killed a Chinese person. One sailor from the ship "Neptune" was convicted and over 50 others were released. The convicted sailor was later released.

=== In popular culture ===
Puankhequa appears as a character in the novel Trade Winds by Christina Courtenay (2010), under the name "Poan Key-qua" or simply "Key-qua".
