= Australian Sailing Museum =

Defunct museum in Mandurah, Western Australia

Coordinates: 32°31′39″S 115°43′04″E

The Australian Sailing Museum was a privately operated museum in Mandurah, Western Australia, which opened in 2008 and closed in 2012.

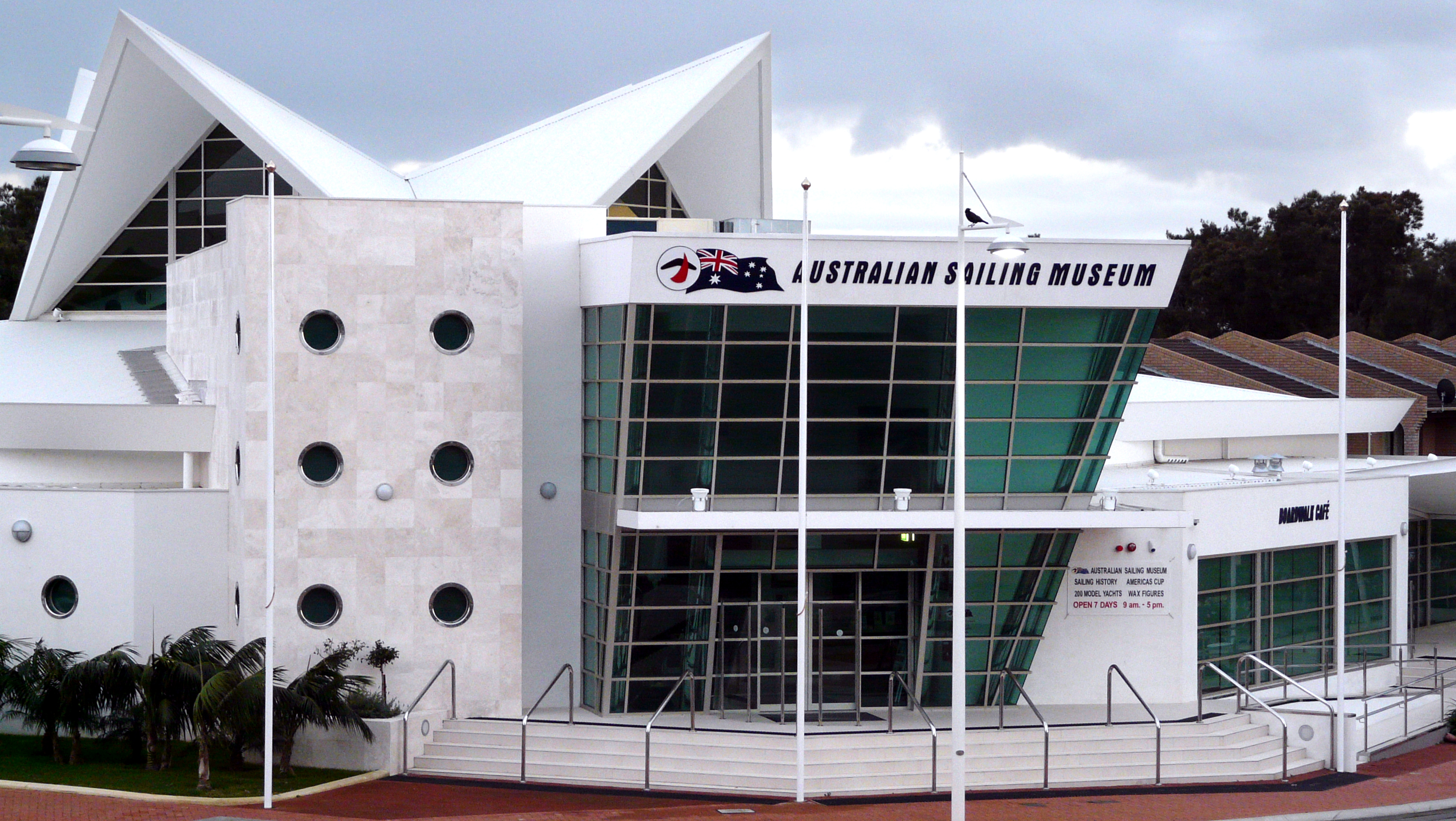
Australian Sailing Museum, Mandurah, Western Australia

Owned and built by Rolly Tasker, the Australian Sailing Museum exhibited a comprehensive display of yacht models, the history of Australian sailing, and sailors, from the 19th century. It hosted maritime artworks, lifelike wax figures of sailing icons (such as a saluting Dennis Conner, John Cox Stevens, and Thomas Lipton), while the main exhibition area was circled with pennants from clubs around the world. The museum also housed the Peninsula Art Gallery which sold prints, the Boardwalk coffee shop and Rolly Tasker Sails Australia which offered sails made by Tasker.

The opening address on Monday 7 April 2008 was made by Governor-General of Australia Michael Jeffery, who opened the museum on Rolly and Kerry Tasker's behalf.

The museum housed an extensive array of built-to-scale model yachts in glass cases. The models were representative of most of the Australian and many international classes of yachts. The Australian sailing and Olympic sailing champions' achievements were listed. Wax figures circled the centre of the museum while sailing history in text and pictures lined the walls.

It was listed as a 2009 Western Australian Tourism Awards Finalist.

Following the death of Rolly Tasker at the age of 86 in 2012, and after failing to find an organisation to take over the collection, his family transferred many of the contents to the Western Australian Museum, while others were sold at auction.

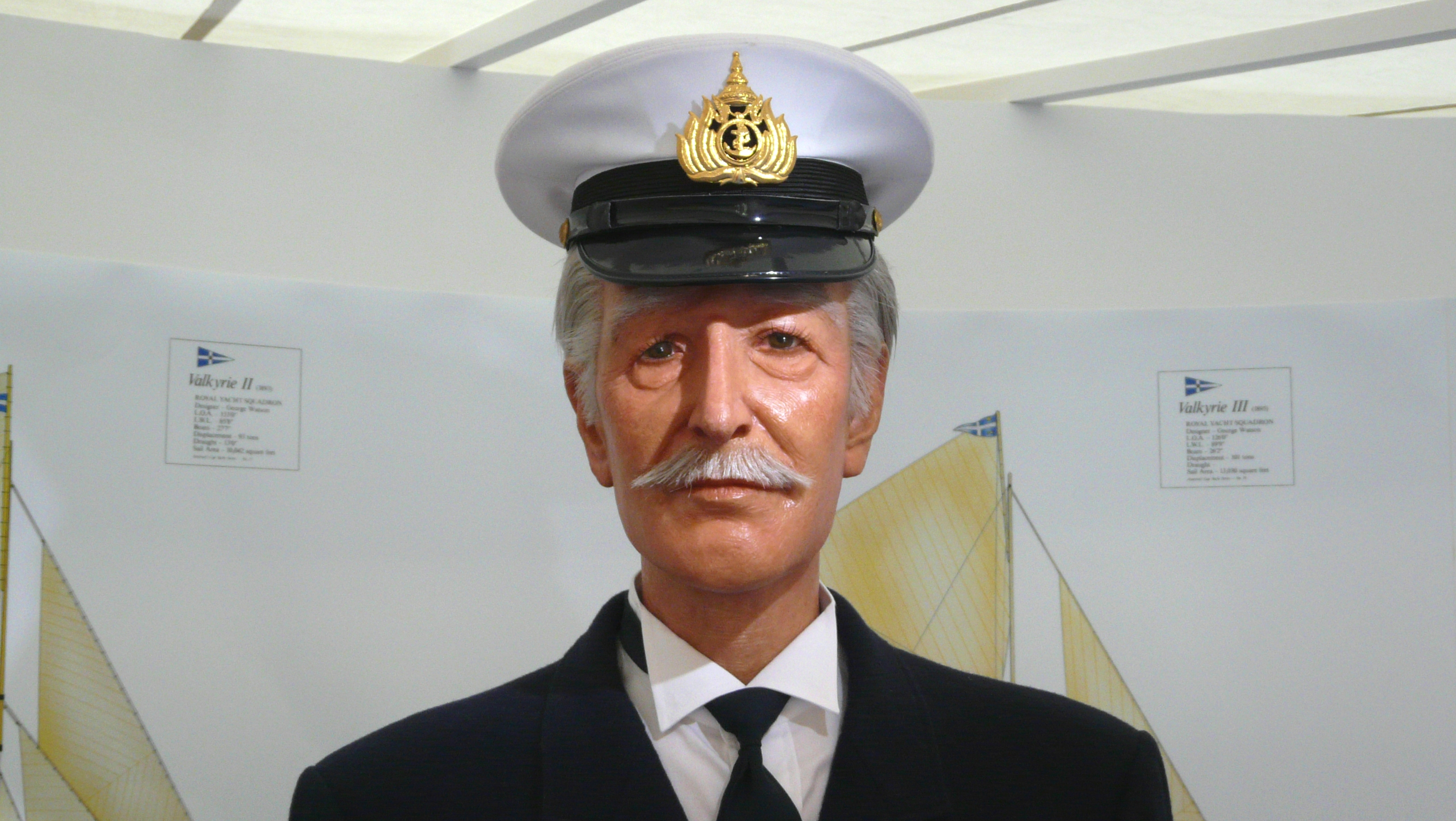
Very lifelike model of the Earl of Dunraven

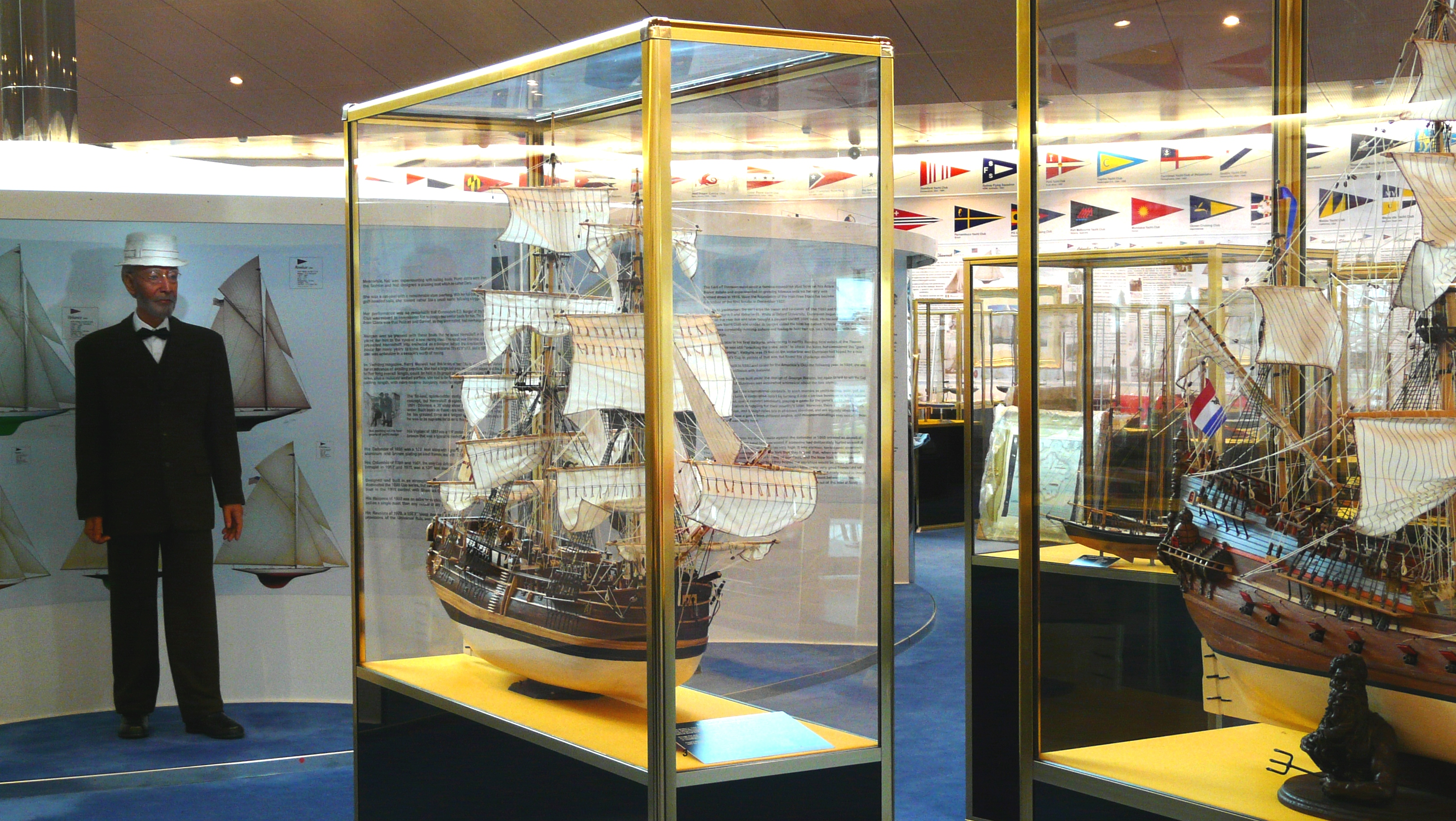
Interior display of Australian Sailing Museum

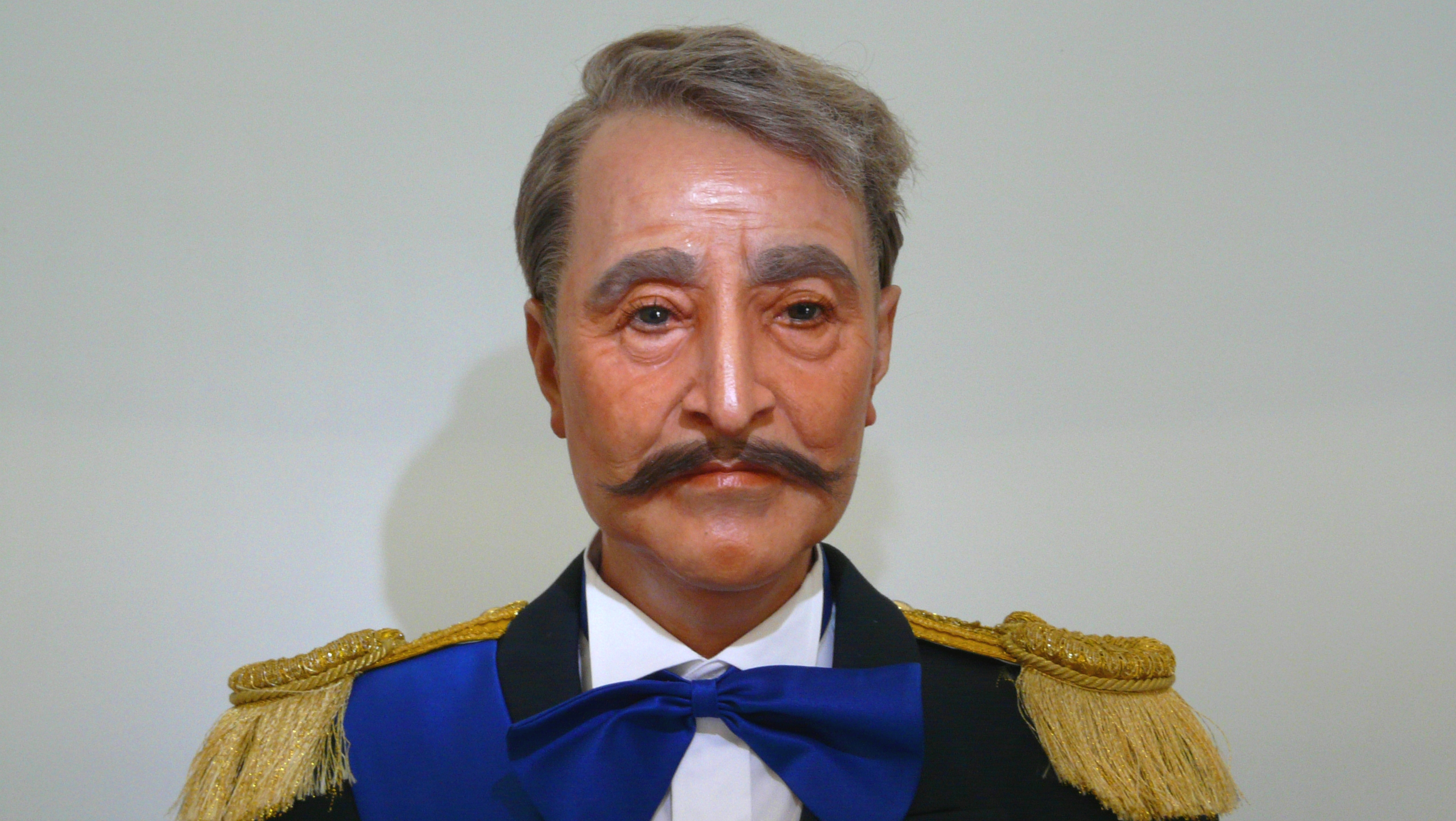
Model of the Earl of Wilton

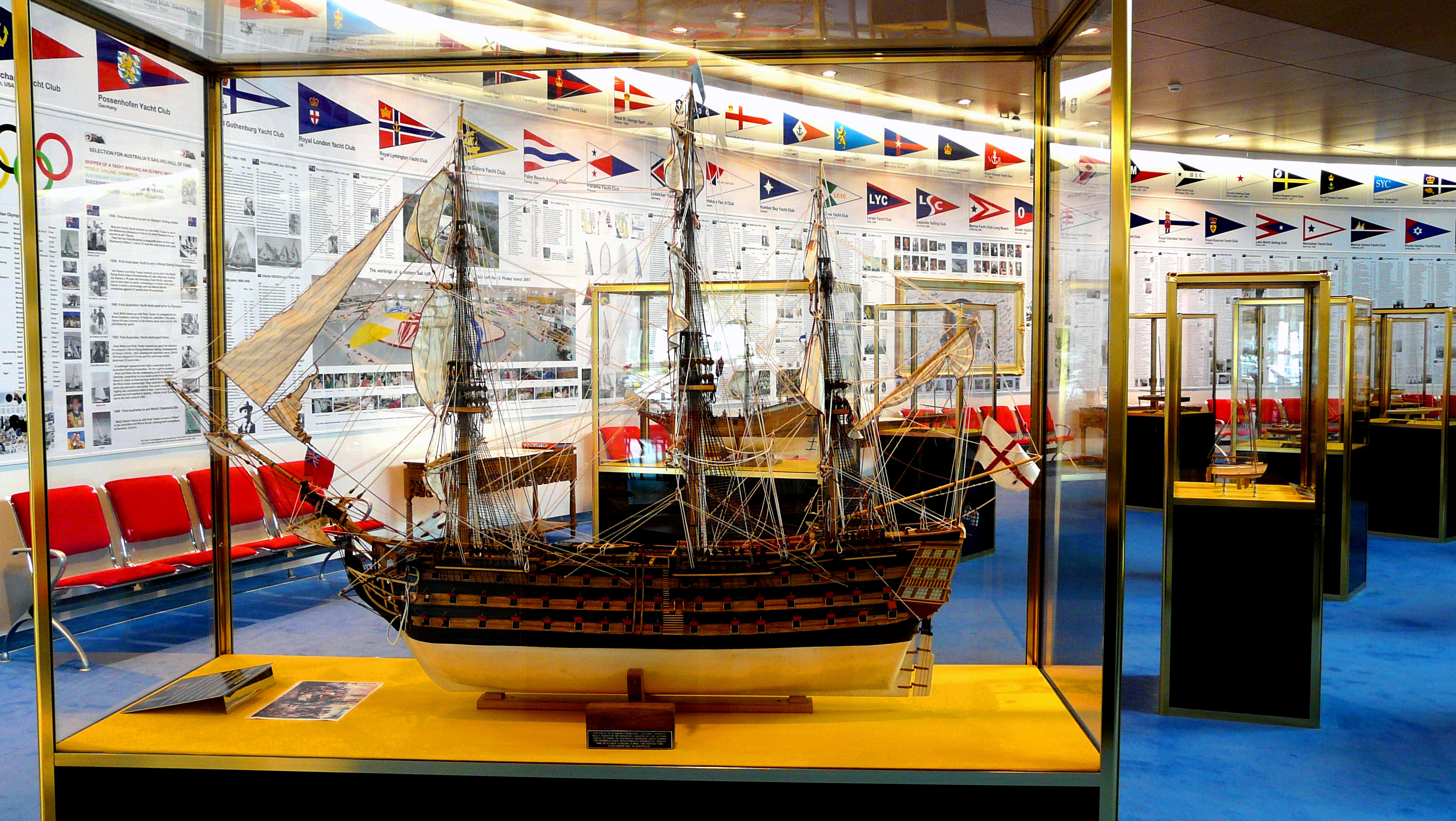
HMS Victory model

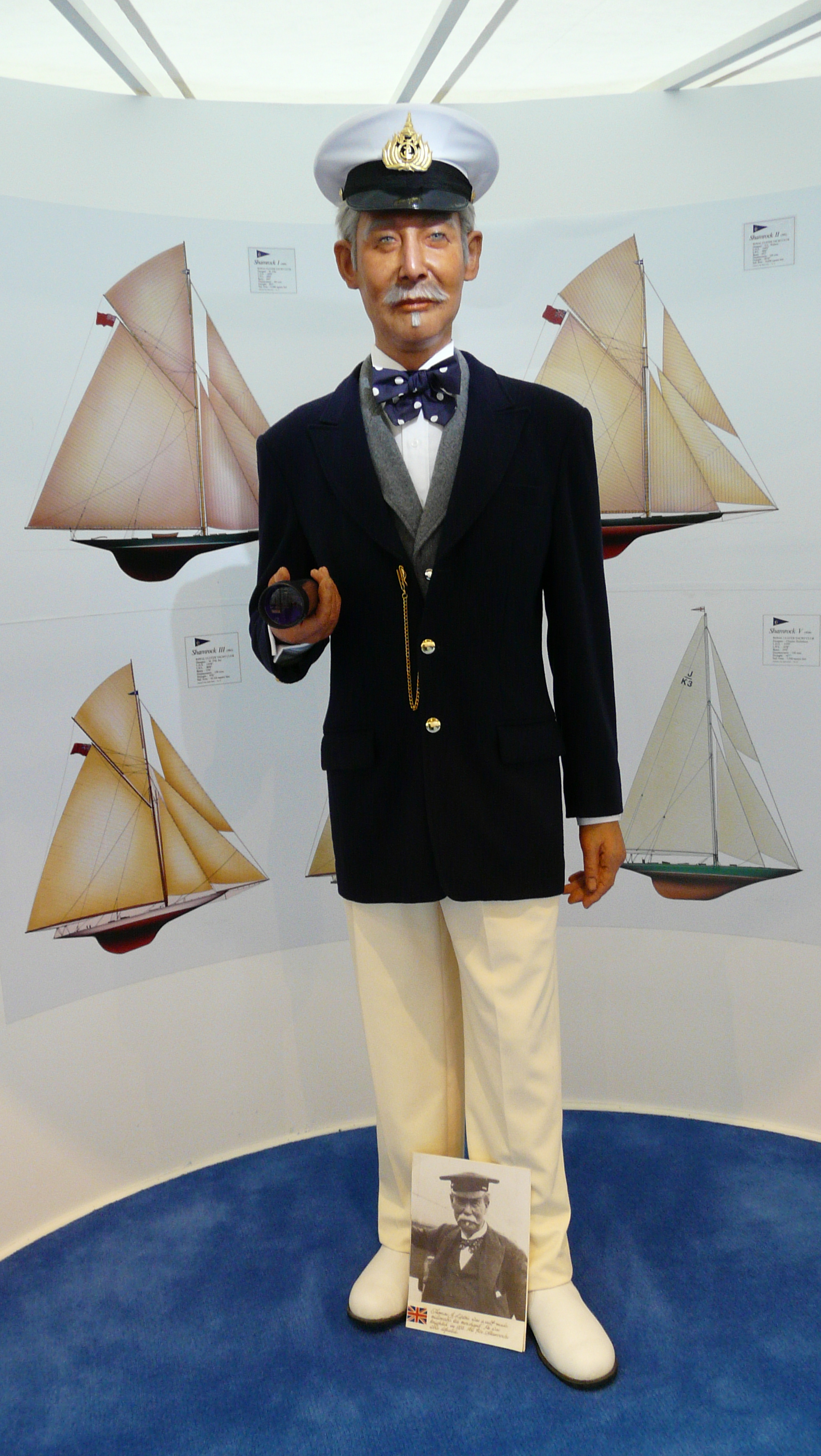
Thomas Lipton

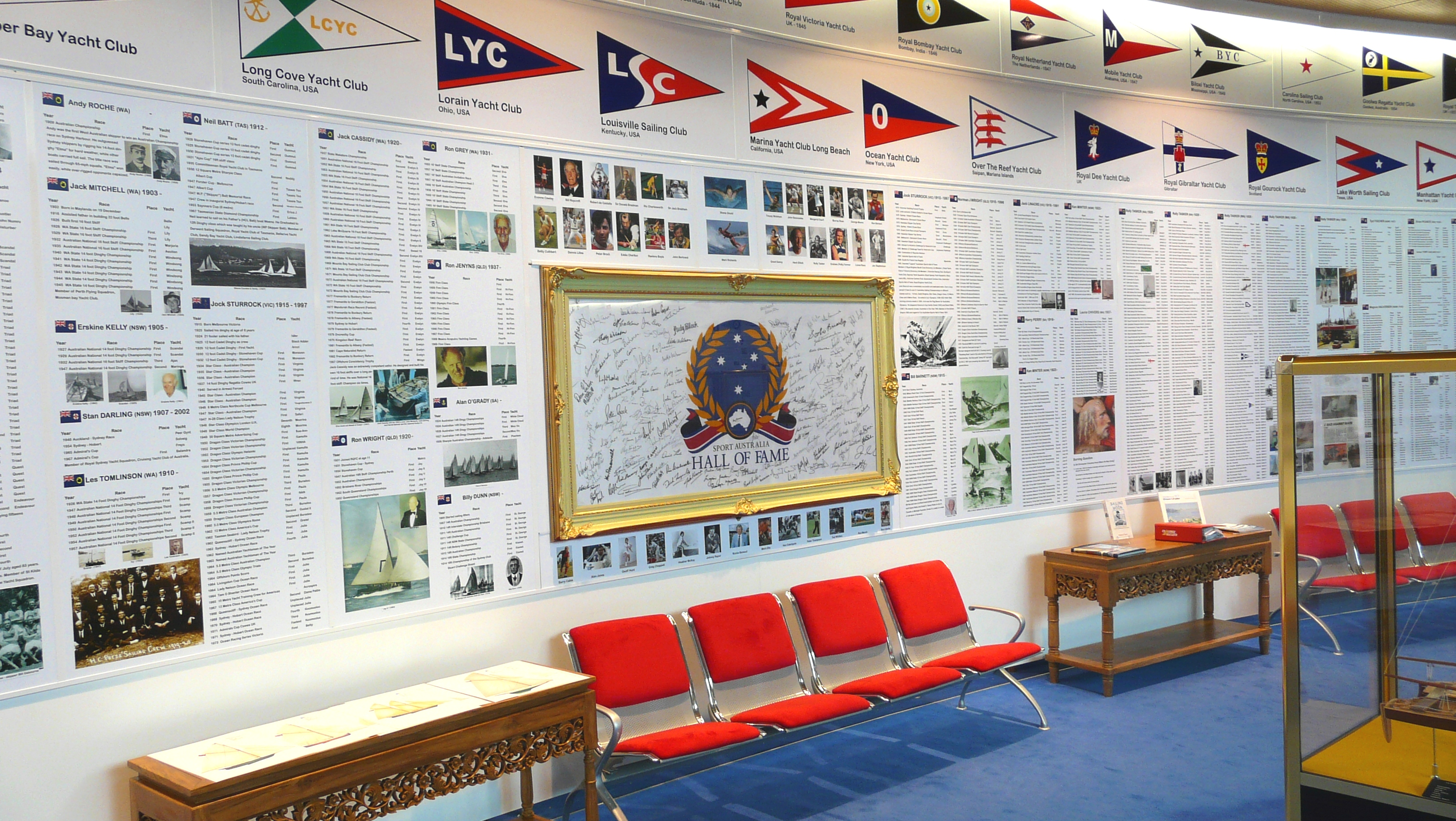
Interior wall display

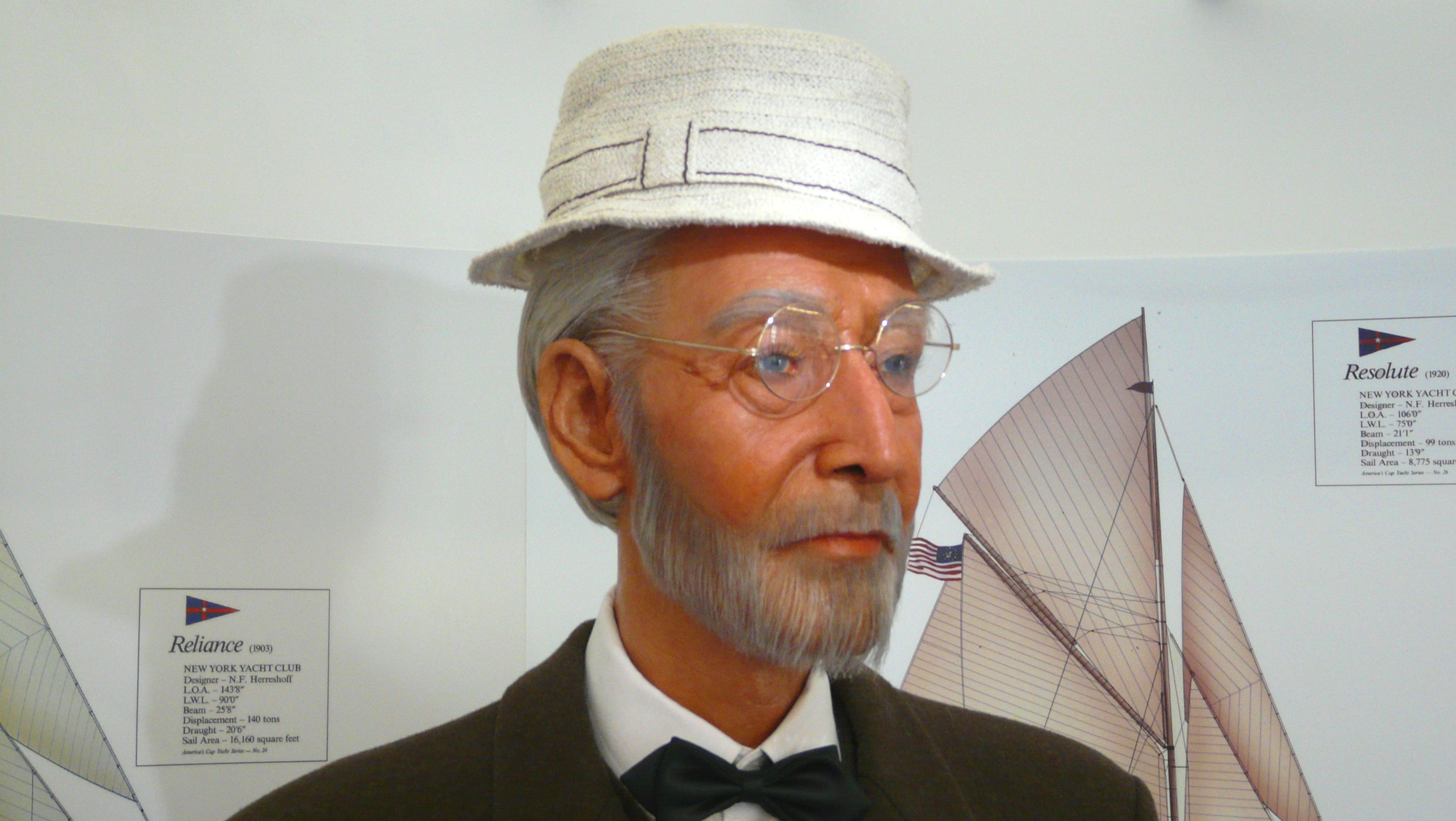
Nathanael Greene Herreshoff
