= John Sully (sailor) =

South African sailor

Personal information
- Nationality: South African
- Born: 9 April 1920
- Died: 24 November 2010 (aged 90)

Sport
- Sport: Sailing

John Sully (9 April 1920 – 24 November 2010) was a South African sailor. He competed in the 12m² Sharpie event at the 1956 Summer Olympics.
