= Stan Renehan =

American sailor

Personal information
- Nationality: American
- Born: December 24, 1929 Norwalk, Connecticut, United States
- Died: October 27, 1995 (aged 65) Delray Beach, Florida, United States

Sport
- Sport: Sailing

Stan Renehan (December 24, 1929 – October 27, 1995) was an American sailor. He competed in the 12m² Sharpie event at the 1956 Summer Olympics.
