= Alfred Evans (sailor) =

South African sailor

Personal information
- Nationality: South African
- Born: 1 October 1920
- Died: 4 March 1998 (aged 77)

Sport
- Sport: Sailing

Alfred Evans (1 October 1920 – 4 March 1998) was a South African sailor. He competed in the 12m² Sharpie event at the 1956 Summer Olympics.
