= Rolf Bercht =

Brazilian sailor (1925–2012)

Personal information
- Born: 26 April 1925 Porto Alegre, Brazil
- Died: 22 September 2012 (aged 87) Porto Alegre, Brazil

Sport
- Sport: Sailing

Rolf Bercht (26 April 1925 – 22 September 2012) was a Brazilian sailor. He competed in the 12m² Sharpie event at the 1956 Summer Olympics.
