= Claude Flahault =

French sailor

Personal information
- Nationality: French
- Born: 9 July 1923; Gravelines, France
- Died: 3 September 2015 (aged 92); Saint-Nazaire, France

Sport
- Sport: Sailing

Claude Flahault (9 July 1923 – 3 September 2015) was a French sailor. He competed in the 12 m^{2} Sharpie event at the 1956 Summer Olympics.
