= New York Television Theatre =

- Country of origin: United States
- Original language: English

Original release
- Network: WNDT/WNET
- Release: 1965 – 1966
- Network: NET/PBS
- Release: 1966 – 1970

New York Television Theatre is an American anthology series produced by WNDT-TV Newark, N.J., and airing on that station from 1965–66. From 1966 to 1970 it was aired on National Educational Television, (NET), later to become PBS. Its thirty productions included adaptations of the works of classic playwrights from the likes of Anton Chekhov to George Bernard Shaw, as well as those of contemporary playwrights like Edward Albee and Lanford Wilson. Guest stars included Maureen Stapleton, Eileen Heckart, Rosemary Harris, Christopher Walken, Fred Gwynne, and James Coco.
