= Eric Olsen (sailor) =

American sailor

Personal information
- Born: March 26, 1916 Brookline, Massachusetts, United States
- Died: May 7, 1993 (aged 77) Boston, Massachusetts, United States

Sport
- Sport: Sailing

C. Eric Olsen, Jr. (March 26, 1916 – May 7, 1993) was an American sailor. He competed in the 12m² Sharpie event at the 1956 Summer Olympics. Olsen was a member of the Duxbury Yacht Club in the 1940s and 1950s.
