= Fred Gwynne =

American actor and author (1926–1993)

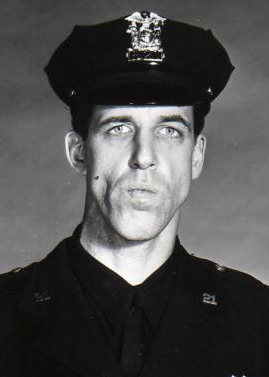
- Gwynne in Car 54, Where Are You?, 1961
- Born: Frederick Hubbard Gwynne; July 10, 1926; New York City, U.S.
- Died: July 2, 1993 (aged 66); Taneytown, Maryland, U.S.
- Resting place: Sandy Mount United Methodist Church Cemetery, Finksburg, Maryland
- Education: Harvard University
- Occupations: Actor; artist; author
- Years active: 1951–1993
- Spouses: Jean Reynard (m. 1952; div. 1980) Deborah Flater (m. 1988)
- Children: 5

Frederick Hubbard Gwynne (July 10, 1926 – July 2, 1993) was an American actor, artist, and author, who is widely known for his roles in the 1960s television sitcoms Car 54, Where Are You? (as Francis Muldoon) and The Munsters (as Herman Munster), as well as his later film roles in The Cotton Club (1984), Pet Sematary (1989), and My Cousin Vinny (1992).

== Early life ==
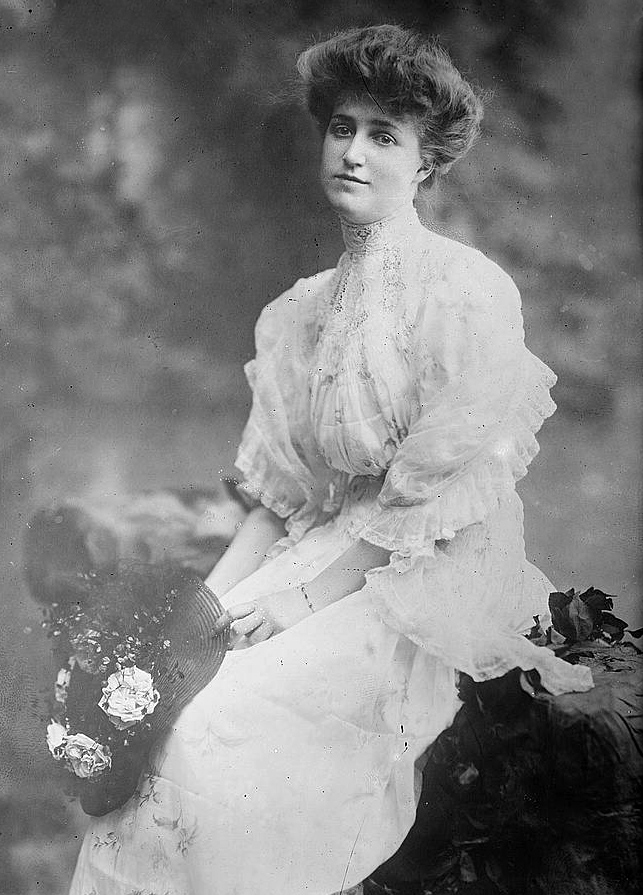
Gwynne's mother, Dorothy Goddard (née Ficken) Gwynne, in 1917

Gwynne was born on July 10, 1926, in New York City, the son of Frederick Walker Gwynne, a partner in the securities firm Gwynne Brothers, and his wife Dorothy Goddard (née Ficken) Gwynne, who, before her marriage, was a successful illustrator, known for the "first cereal mascot", the "Sunny Jim" advertising character for the breakfast cereal, Force, for the advertising agent Earnest Elmo Calkins. He had at least two siblings, Dorothy Gwynne and Bowers Gwynne, both of whom died young. His paternal grandfather, Walker Gwynne, was an Anglican priest, born c. 1846 in Camus, County Tyrone, Ireland, who married American Helen Lea Bowers. His maternal grandfather, H. Edwards Ficken, was a British immigrant who married the American Josephine (or Josephina) Preston Hubbard. Although Gwynne partially grew up in Tuxedo Park, New York, he spent most of his childhood in South Carolina, Florida, and Colorado because his father traveled extensively.

Following his father's death, his mother sent him to boarding school at Groton School, where he graduated in 1944 and may have set the school record for disciplinary black marks. He was president of the drama club and made his first stage appearance in a school production of Henry V. Forty years later, he used his drawing skills to pen the school's official campus map.

Having attended high school during World War II, Gwynne joined the United States Navy after graduation, serving as a radioman on submarine chaser PC-581 (later named USS Manville).

After the war, Gwynne attended art school at the Phoenix School of Design (now affiliated with the Pratt Institute) in New York, with "the dream of doing Saturday Evening Post covers." He found that the work was not right for him, and transferred to Harvard College in 1948, graduating in 1951. He was a member of the Fly Club, served as president of the Harvard Lampoon (and as an in-house cartoonist), sang with the Harvard Krokodiloes a cappella group, and acted for the Hasty Pudding Theatricals. He was affiliated with Adams House. During his tenure as Lampoon president, the Middlesex County District Attorney once attempted to ban the publication of the Lampoon's parody magazine for obscenity. In response, Gwynne joked that "This just proves what we already knew – moral standards in New England are higher than elsewhere in the country."

In the 1940s, Gwynne was a summertime swimming instructor at the Duxbury Yacht Club pool in Duxbury, Massachusetts.

== Career ==
Gwynne joined the Brattle Theatre Repertory Company after his 1951 graduation, then moved to New York City. To support himself, Gwynne worked as a copywriter for the J. Walter Thompson advertising agency, resigning in 1952 upon being cast in his first Broadway role, a gangster in a comedy called Mrs. McThing starring Helen Hayes. Another early role was a New York City Drama Company production at City Center of Shakespeare's Love's Labour's Lost in 1953, in the role of Dull, a constable. Gwynne preferred theater to film and television, and maintained that if the United States had a national theater mounting year-round productions, he would rather work there.

In 1954, he made his first cinematic appearance playing – in an uncredited role – the laconic character Slim in the Oscar-winning film On the Waterfront. Shortly afterwards, Phil Silvers sought him for his television show because he had been impressed by Gwynne's comedic work in Mrs. McThing. As a result, Gwynne made a memorable appearance on The Phil Silvers Show in the episode "The Eating Contest" as the character Corporal Ed Honnergar, whose depressive eating binges are exploited in an eating contest.

Gwynne's second appearance on The Phil Silvers Show (in the episode "It's for the Birds") and appearances on many other shows led writer-producer Nat Hiken to cast him in the sitcom Car 54, Where Are You? as Patrolman Francis Muldoon.

Gwynne was 6 ft 5 in (1.95 m) tall, an attribute that contributed to his being cast as Herman Munster, a goofy parody of Frankenstein's monster, in the sitcom The Munsters. For his role, he had to wear 40 or 50 pounds (18–22.6 kg) of padding, makeup, and 5-inch asphalt-spreader boots. His face was painted a bright violet because it captured the most light on the black-and-white film. Gwynne was known for his sense of humor and retained fond recollections of Herman, saying in later life, "I might as well tell you the truth. I love old Herman Munster. Much as I try not to, I can't stop liking that fellow."

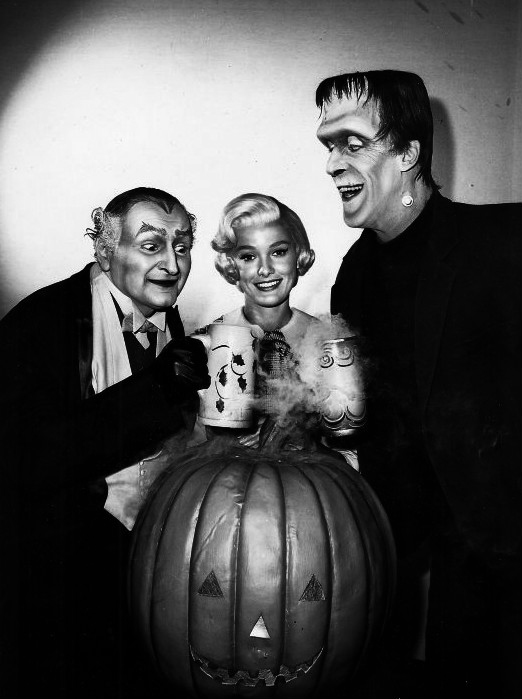
Gwynne (right) as Herman Munster, sharing a toast with Al Lewis (Grandpa) while Beverley Owen (Marilyn) looks on

After his iconic role in The Munsters, Gwynne found himself typecast, unable to gain new film roles for over two years. In 1969, he was cast as Jonathan Brewster in a television production of Arsenic and Old Lace. The Brewster character was originally played by Boris Karloff, who also played Frankenstein's monster on which Gwynne's Herman Munster character was based, in the Broadway production of the play. Gwynne then found success as a stage actor in regional state productions across the United States while maintaining a low Hollywood profile.

A talented vocalist, Gwynne sang in a Hallmark Hall of Fame television production The Littlest Angel (1969), and went on to perform in a variety of roles on stage and screen. In 1974, drawing upon his own Southern roots, he appeared in the role of Big Daddy Pollitt in the Broadway revival of Cat on a Hot Tin Roof with Elizabeth Ashley, Keir Dullea and Kate Reid. In 1975, he played the Stage Manager in Our Town at the American Shakespeare Theatre in Stratford, Connecticut.

From 1975 to 1982, Gwynne appeared in 83 episodes in different roles on the popular radio drama series, the CBS Radio Mystery Theater, produced and directed by Himan Brown. He returned to Broadway in 1976 as Colonel J.C. Kinkaid in two parts of A Texas Trilogy. In 1984, Gwynne auditioned for the part of Henry on the sitcom Punky Brewster, then withdrew in frustration when a director identified him as Herman Munster rather than by his real name. The role of Henry went to George Gaynes. In 1987, Gwynne starred in the short-lived TV series Jake's M.O., where he played an investigative reporter.

Gwynne's performance as Jud Crandall in Pet Sematary was based on author Stephen King, who is only an inch shorter than the actor, and uses a similarly thick Maine dialect. The character's likeness and accent, as played by Gwynne, have been used in a number of episodes of the animated show South Park, beginning in 2001 and as recently as 2019. Gwynne also had roles in the movies Simon, On the Waterfront, So Fine, Disorganized Crime, The Cotton Club, Captains Courageous, The Secret of My Success, Water, Ironweed, Fatal Attraction, and The Boy Who Could Fly. Despite his misgiving about having been typecast, he agreed to reprise the role of Herman Munster for the 1981 TV reunion movie The Munsters' Revenge. Gwynne performed the role of Judge Chamberlain Haller in his final film, the 1992 comedy My Cousin Vinny.

=== As painter and illustrator ===
In addition to his acting career, Gwynne sang professionally, painted, and wrote and illustrated children's books, including Best in Show (later titled It's Easy to See Why), A Chocolate Moose for Dinner, The King Who Rained, Pondlarker, The Battle of the Frogs and Mice, and A Little Pigeon Toad. Many of these efforts were based on children's frequent misperceptions of things they hear from adults, such as the "chocolate moose for dinner", illustrated as a moose seated at the dinner table. The other books on this theme were The King Who Rained, A Little Pigeon Toad (in which a child's mother thus describes her father), and The Sixteen Hand Horse. Initially the books did not achieve wider popularity because their format was geared to a very young audience, but the concept was more appealing to older children and adults. Eventually they achieved critical success and became regular bestsellers for their publisher. He also did his voice work for TV and radio commercials. Later in his career he held several shows of his artwork, the first in 1989.

== Personal life ==
In 1952, Gwynne married socialite Jean "Foxy" Reynard, a granddaughter of New York City mayor William Jay Gaynor. Before divorcing in 1980, the couple had five children.

In 1988, Gwynne married his second wife, Deborah Flater. They remained married until his death in 1993.

== Death ==
Gwynne died of complications from pancreatic cancer, at his home in Taneytown, Maryland, on July 2, 1993, at age 66. He is buried in an unmarked grave at Sandy Mount United Methodist Church Cemetery in Finksburg, Maryland.

== Filmography ==
=== Film ===
Year	Title	Role	Notes
1954	On the Waterfront	Mladen "Slim" Sekulovich	Uncredited
1966	Munster, Go Home!	Herman Munster	
1979	La Luna	Douglas Winter	
1980	Simon	Major General Korey	
1981	So Fine	Chairman Lincoln	
1984	The Cotton Club	George "Big Frenchy" DeMange	
1985	Water	Spender	
1986	Off Beat	Police Commissioner	
1986	The Boy Who Could Fly	Uncle Hugo	
1986	The Christmas Star	Officer Waters	
1987	The Secret of My Success	Donald Davenport	
1987	Fatal Attraction	Arthur Hurst	
1987	Ironweed	Oscar Reo	
1987	Jake's M.O.	Jake Tekulve	
1989	Disorganized Crime	Max Green	
1989	Pet Sematary	Jud Crandall	
1991	Shadows and Fog	Hacker's Follower	
1992	My Cousin Vinny	Judge Chamberlain Haller	Final film role

=== Television ===
Year	Title	Role	Notes
1952	The Repertory Theatre	Performer	Episode: "A Man's Game"
1953	You Are There	Davy Crockett	2 episodes
1955–1956	The Phil Silvers Show	Corporal Ed Honnegan	2 episodes
1956	Studio One in Hollywood	Little Dude	Episode: "The Landady's Daughter"
1957	The Kaiser Aluminum Hour	"Egghead"	Episode: "A Man's Game"
1957	Suspicion	Hughie	Episode: "Hand in Glove"
1957	Kraft Theatre	Performer	2 episodes
1958	The Steve Allen Show	Comedian	Episode: #3.23
1958	The Investigator	Performer	Episode: #1.07
1958	DuPont Show of the Month	E.J. Loffgrin	2 episodes
1961	The Play of the Week	Performer	Episode: "The Old Foolishness"
1961–1963	Car 54, Where Are You?	Officer Francis Mulldoon	60 episodes
1962	The DuPont Show of the Week	William Magee	Episode: "Seven Keys to Baldgate"
1963	The United States Steel Hour	Willie Botsford	Episode: "Don't Shake the Family Tree"
1964	Brenner	Francis X. Fish	Episode: "Charlie Paradise: The Tragic Flute"
1964	My Son, the Witch Doctor	Performer	TV film
1964–1966	The Munsters	Herman Munster	Main role; 70 episodes
1965	The Red Skelton Show	Herman Munster	Episode: "Ta-Ra-Ra-Bum-Today"
1966	The Danny Kaye Show	Herman Munster	Episode: "Fred Gwynne"
1966	New York Television Theatre	The Professor	Episode: "The Lesson"
1967	NET Playhouse	Officer Avonzino	Episode: "Infancy and Childhood"
1968	Mad Mad Scientist	Warren Springer	TV film
1969	Arsenic and Old Lace	Jonathan Brewster	TV film
1969	Anderson and Company	Marshall Anderson	TV film
1969	The Littlest Angel	Guardian Angel	TV film
1971	Dames at Sea	Hennesey	TV film
1971	Great Performances	Pike	Episode: "Paradise Lost"
1971	The Police	Sergeant	TV film
1972	Harvey	Cab Driver	TV film
1972	Norman Corwin Presents	Performer	Episode: "Aunt Dorothy's Playroom"
1976	Bound for Freedom	Waldruss	TV film
1976	Captains and the Kings	Performer	Miniseries
1977	Captains Courageous	Jack "Long Jack"	TV film
1979	Sanctuary of Fear	Judge Potter	TV film
1980	A Day with Conrad Green	Conrad Green	TV film
1981	The Munsters' Revenge	Herman Munster	TV film
1982–1987	American Playhouse	Charles Dickens	2 episodes
1982	The Mysterious Stranger	Balthasar Hoffman	TV film
1985	Kane & Abel	Davis LeRoy	2 episodes
1986	Vanishing Act	Father Macklin	TV film
1987	Murder by the Book	Victor Greville	TV film
1990	Murder in Black and White	Brannigan	TV film
1990	Earthday Birthday	Fred The Moose	Voice, TV film
1992	Lincoln	Edwin Stanton	Voice, TV film

== Theatre ==
Year	Title	Role	Notes
1952–1953	Mrs. McThing	Stinker	
1953	Love's Labour's Lost	Dull	
1953	The Frogs of Spring	Luther Raubel	
1960–1961	Irma La Douce	Polyte-Le-Mou	
1963–1964	Here's Love	Marvin Shellhammer	
1972	The Lincoln Mask	Abraham Lincoln	
1974–1975	Cat on a Hot Tin Roof	Big Daddy	
1975	Our Town	Stage Manager	
1976	A Texas Trilogy: The Last Meeting of the Knights of the White Magnolia	Colonel J.C. Kinkaid	
1976	A Texas Trilogy: The Oldest Living Graduate	Colonel J.C. Kinkaid	
1978	Angel	W. O. Gant	
1978	Players	Jock Riley	
1982–1983	Whodunnit	Inspector Bowden	
