= Duxbury Yacht Club =

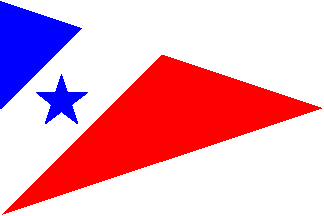
- Burgee
- Founded: 1875
- Location: 70 Fairway Lane, Duxbury, Massachusetts 02332
- Website: duxburyyachtclub.org

The Duxbury Yacht Club (DYC) is a private club located in Duxbury, Massachusetts that offers sailing, golf, tennis, paddle, swimming, and junior activities. It was founded in 1875 and was incorporated in 1895. The DYC is unique among yacht clubs in the United States because it is the only American yacht club to offer athletic recreation besides yachting and golf, and one of five American yacht clubs to offer athletic recreation besides yachting. It was among the first yacht clubs founded in the United States in the 19th century.

== Governance ==
The DYC is governed by an Executive Committee, a Board of Directors, and Committee Chairs.

The Executive Committee includes a Commodore, a Vice Commodore, a Rear Commodore, a Treasurer, a Secretary, and an Activities Chairperson. The Board of Directors include committee chairpersons, a former Commodore, and "generalists." Committee Chairs direct specific club activities and operations; e.g., finance, property, and entertainment.

== History ==
The DYC was founded in 1875, but was not incorporated until 1895. The articles of incorporation state, "The purpose for which the corporation is constituted is the encouragement of yachting and athletic exercises. The place in which the corporation is established or located is the Town of Duxbury within the Commonwealth of Massachusetts."

The club began by offering competitive yachting and sailing recreation in Duxbury Bay. In 1900, golf was an activity available to members after the DYC leased fields from J. Knowles Parker's farmland. A six-hole golf course was constructed between 1913 and 1915 on land acquired from the farms of Parker, Peterson, White, and Reynolds. Lawn tennis was played on the private courts of members between 1900 and 1927, until the DYC constructed three courts on its own property. Theatrical stage performances produced by the DYC began in the 1940s. By the end of the 1960s, four blue clay tennis courts were added to the original three. An eighteen-hole golf course was completed in 1976 after the addition of nine holes to the original course.

== Notable alumni ==
=== Members ===
- C. Eric Olsen, Jr., 1940s-50s, DYC sailing champion; 1956 U.S. Summer Olympics, Sailing and Two-Person Heavyweight Dinghy
- Victoria Wadsworth, 1980s-90s, DYC junior sailing crew; 1996 Tufts University All-American Woman's Sailing Crew

=== Staff ===
- Fred Gwynne, 1940s, DYC swimming instructor; Hollywood film actor
- John "Jack" Barnaby, 1960s-1971, DYC tennis and squash player
