= Peter Mander =

New Zealand sailor

Peter Mander OBE
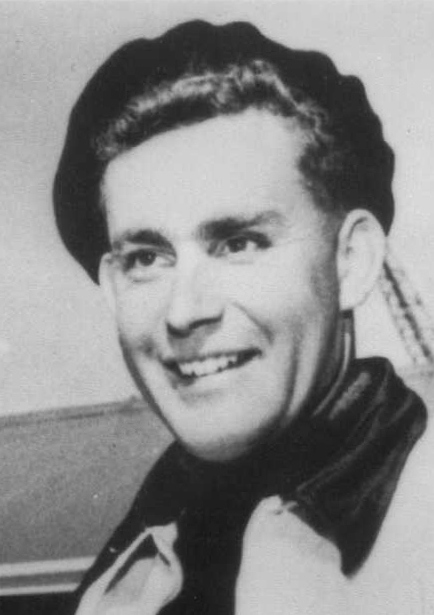
- Mander in 1956

Personal information
- Full name: Peter Garth Mander
- Born: 4 July 1928 Christchurch, New Zealand
- Died: 21 June 1998 (aged 69) Christchurch, New Zealand
- Height: 181 cm (5 ft 11 in)
- Weight: 84 kg (185 lb)
Medal record
Sailing
Representing New Zealand
Olympic Games
Gold medal – first place	1956 Melbourne	Sharpie class

Peter Garth Mander OBE (4 July 1928 – 21 June 1998) was a New Zealand yachtsman and Olympic gold medal winner. With Jack Cropp, Mander won the 12 m^{2} Sharpie class at the 1956 Summer Olympics in Melbourne. Mander then retired from competitive yachting, but made a comeback and was selected to compete in the Finn class at the 1964 Summer Olympics where he finished fourth. He later became the president of the New Zealand Yachting Federation.

Mander also won two world 18-footer championships, in 1952 and 1954, as well as 16 New Zealand national yachting titles in eight different classes. In 1972 he was named New Zealand yachtsman of the year, and in 1990 he was inducted, with Jack Cropp, into the New Zealand Sports Hall of Fame.

Born in the Christchurch suburb of Sumner in 1928, Mander was the son of Nina Pretoria Mander (née Hoglund) and Stanley Augustus Mander, who played for the New Zealand hockey team. His younger brother, Graham Mander, competed in the 1968 Summer Olympics, also as a yachtsman. He was educated at St Andrew's College.

Outside of yachting, Mander was a businessman. He joined Christchurch clothing company Deanes Industries in 1950 and rose to becoming managing director. He also served as a director of the clothing and retail companies R.W. Saunders and Hallenstein Brothers.

In the 1992 New Year Honours, Mander was appointed an Officer of the Order of the British Empire, for services to yachting. He died in Christchurch on 21 June 1998.
