= Bona AB =

Swedish flooring company

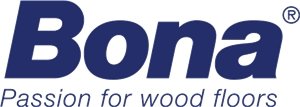
- Type: Family-owned company
- Industry: Floor care
- Founded: 1919
- Founder: Wilhelm Edner
- Headquarters: Lokgatan 8, 211 20 Malmö
- Area served: Worldwide
- Key people: Kerstin Lindell (Interim CEO and Chair of the Board)
- Products: Adhesives, finishes, oils, UV-finishes, sanding machines, abrasives, floor care products for wooden and resilient floors
- Revenue: SEK 4 billion (2023)
- Number of employees: 700 (2024)
- Website: www.bona.com

Bona AB is a Swedish family-owned floor care company founded in 1919 and headquartered in Malmö. The company manufactures and supplies products for the installation, maintenance and renovation of wooden and resilient floors and also supplies UV coatings to international producers of wooden and resilient floors. Bona is present in more than 70 countries through subsidiaries and country distributors.

Bona pioneered waterborne finishes in 1979, and presented the patent in 1982. Bona has production facilities in Sweden, Germany, and the US. Bona's US headquarters are in Englewood, Colorado. Bona prioritizes the use of water-based finishes and employs eco-friendly manufacturing processes. Bona is known for its GreenGuard-certified products, which comply with strict indoor air quality regulations.

== History ==
The Bona story started in the 1890s, when Wilhelm Edner opened a grocery shop in Malmö, Sweden selling coffee and various household products. The years went by, the business developed and, during the 1910s, floor wax, a completely new product on the Swedish market at the time, came into the picture. In August 1919, Wilhelm Edner registered a company called Aktiebolaget Bona. This is the date that Bona AB, the floor care company, was founded, since then the company has exclusively worked with the treatment of wooden floors.

From the company's foundation, Bona produced wax-based floor care products; later expanding their product range to include finishes, sealers, and other wood floor care products, as consumer demand evolved. Throughout the 20th century, Bona invested in research and development to improve its products and establish itself as a prominent player in the wood flooring industry.

Throughout the 1990s, Bona expanded its international operations by establishing subsidiaries and distribution networks in 90 countries globally.

In 1997, Bona's American division (then-known as BonaKemi) made a partnership with Orange Glo International (purchased by Church and Dwight in 2006) for their Orange Glo-branded products, such as the Orange Glo Wood Cleaner & Polish, and later the Orange Glo Hardwood Floor Refinisher, followed by other Orange Glo products.

From 2007 to 2020, Kerstin Lindell served as the president and CEO of the company. In 2021 she transitioned to the role of chairman of the board, while Pontus Cornelius assumed the position of president and CEO. Magnus Andersson held the CEO position at Bona AB from 2022 to 2024. Since August 2024 Kerstin Lindell has stepped back into the executive spotlight, serving as interim CEO alongside her responsibilities as chairman of the board.

== Products ==
Bona has products for contractors, homeowners and parquet producers.

=== Contractors ===
- Renovation with waterborne finishes
- Dust-free sanding machines
- Ergonomic sanding machines
- Silane-based adhesives

=== Homeowners ===
Bona offers a product range for renovation and maintenance adapted for use by end consumers.

=== Parquet Producers ===
Bona is a supplier of UV-coatings to international producers of wooden floors.
