= Bona (Sénégal) =

Coordinates: 12°57′N 15°50′W

Bono
- Interactive map of Bono
- Country: Senegal
- Time zone: UTC+0 (GMT)

Bono is a settlement in Senegal.
