= Bill Thomas (sailor) =

Canadian sailor (1918–1982)

William George Thomas (December 6, 1918 – October 30, 1982) was a Canadian sailor who competed in the 1956 Summer Olympics.
