= Terence Smith (sailor) =

British sailor (1932–2021)

Medal record

Sailing

Representing Great Britain

Olympic Games
Bronze medal – third place	1956 Melbourne	Sharpie class

Terence James George "Terry" Smith (18 October 1932 – 11 September 2021) was a British sailor. He won a bronze medal in the Sharpie class with Jasper Blackall at the 1956 Summer Olympics.
