= John Scott (sailor) =

Australian sailor

Medal record

Men's sailing

Representing Australia

Olympic Games
Silver medal – second place	1956 Melbourne	Sharpie class

John Malcolm Scott (29 September 1934 – 25 May 1993) was an Australian sailor. He won a silver medal in the Sharpie class with Rolly Tasker at the 1956 Summer Olympics.
