= Jack Cropp =

New Zealand sailor (1927–2016)

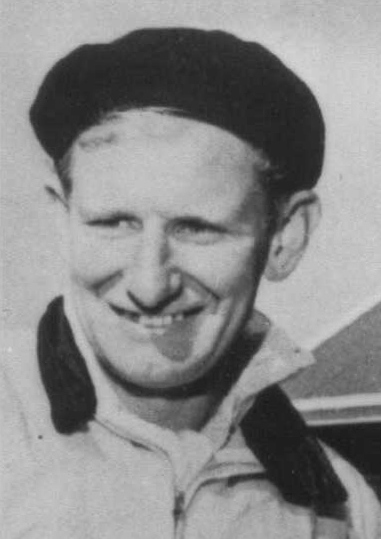
- Cropp in 1956

Personal information
- Full name: John Urquhart Cropp
- Born: 23 May 1927 Hokitika, New Zealand
- Died: 25 June 2016 (aged 89) Tākaka, New Zealand

Sport

Sailing career
- Class: Sharpie
- Club: Canterbury Yacht and Motor Boat Club
Medal record
Representing New Zealand
Olympic Games
Gold medal – first place	1956 Melbourne	Sharpie class

John Urquhart Cropp (23 May 1927 – 25 June 2016) was a New Zealand yachtsman. Together with Peter Mander, Cropp won the Sharpie class at the 1956 Olympics.

Cropp and Mander were the first sailors from New Zealand to compete at Olympics. They finished second, and were promoted to the first place after Australian team was disqualified for obstruction. They were inducted into the New Zealand Sports Hall of Fame in 1990.

Cropp was born on a small farm at Kowhitirangi, near Hokitika. When he was a toddler, his family moved to McCormacks Bay, Christchurch. There he started sailing, together with Mander who lived nearby. Cropp initially worked as a lithographer in the printing industry, but after becoming a prominent sailor turned into a professional boatbuilder and designer. In 1973 Cropp, his wife Judith and their three children moved to Tākaka, where he died aged 89.
