= Spyros Bonas =

Greek sailor (1932–2014)

Personal information
- Nationality: Greek
- Born: March 1932 Corfu, Greece
- Died: January 2014 (aged 81)

Sport
- Sport: Sailing

Spyros Bonas (March 1932 – January 2014) was a Greek sailor. He competed in the 12m² Sharpie event at the 1956 Summer Olympics.
