= Bona, Sweden =

Bona
- Location within Östergötland Location within Sweden
- Coordinates: 58°38′59″N 15°3′0″E
- Country: Sweden
- Municipality: Motala Municipality
- County: Östergötland County
- Province: Östergötland
- Time zone: UTC+1 (CET)
  - Summer (DST): UTC+2 (CEST)

Bona is a town in Sweden located near Motala in Östergötland County, Östergötland.

- "Bona, Sweden Page". Falling Rain Genomics.
