= Jasper Blackall =

British sailor (1920–2020)

Personal information
- Full name: Jasper Roy Blackall
- Born: 20 July 1920 Hackney, Greater London, Great Britain
- Died: 2020 Portugal

Sailing career
- Sport: Sailing
Medal record
Sailing
Representing Great Britain
Olympic Games
Bronze medal – third place	1956 Melbourne	Sharpie

Jasper Roy Blackall (20 July 1920 – 2020) was a British sailor. He won a bronze medal in the Sharpie class with Terence Smith at the 1956 Summer Olympics. He went on to form a graphic design company with Peter Cook and Rod Dew (Blackall, Cook and Dew) in 1961. Blackall was an illustrator and designer serving the advertising industry in London. Blackall died in Portugal in 2020.
