= Antonios Bonas =

Greek sailor

Personal information
- Nationality: Greek
- Born: 29 January 1948; Piraeus, Greece
- Died: 18 June 2018 (aged 70)

Sport
- Sport: Sailing

Antonios Bonas (29 January 1948 – 18 June 2018) was a Greek sailor. He competed at the 1972 Summer Olympics and the 1976 Summer Olympics.
