= Bonnie =

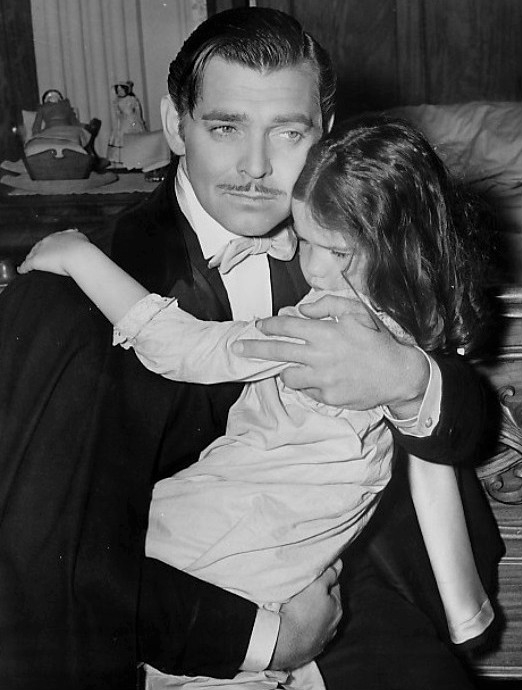
- Clark Gable as Rhett Butler and Cammie King as Bonnie Blue Butler in a scene from the popular 1939 film Gone with the Wind
- Pronunciation: /ˈbɒni/ BON-ee
- Gender: Primarily female

Origin
- Origin: Scottish
- Meaning: Pretty, Attractive, Beautiful, Good

Other names
- Related names: Bona, Bonaccorso, Bonaparte, Bonaventura, Bonaventure, Boniface, Bonilla, Bonita, Bonne, Bonney, Bonni, Bonnibel, Bonny

Bonnie is a Scottish feminine given name. It comes from the Scots language word "bonnie" (handsome, pretty, attractive), or the French bonne (good). That is in turn derived from the Latin word "bonus" (good). The name can also be used as a pet form of Bonita.

== Usage ==
The name has been in use, primarily in the Anglosphere, since the 1800s. It has been ranked among the 50 most popular names for newborn girls in the United Kingdom since 2020 and had been rising in popularity for British girls since the 1990s. It was among the 1,000 most used names for newborn girls in the United States between 1880 and 2003, reaching the height of popularity between 1928 and 1966, when it was ranked among the 100 most popular names for newborn American girls. It was also ranked among the 1,000 most popular names for newborn American boys between 1884 and 1953. The name then declined in popularity but has again risen in usage for girls in the United States in recent years and has been ranked among the 1,000 most popular names for newborn girls there since 2014. It has also been among the top 100 names for girls in Australia since 2014, in New Zealand since 2021, and in Sweden since 2019. In Canada, the name was among the 100 most popular names for girls between 1940 and 1973, but has since declined in usage. The name is sometimes used as a descriptive reference, as in the Scottish folk song My Bonnie Lies over the Ocean or Bonnie Dundee about John Graham, 7th Laird of Claverhouse.

Spelling variants in use include Bonney, Bonni and Bonny. Elaborations of the name such as Bonnibel are also used. Other related names, also containing the word element bon, meaning good or attractive in various languages, include the French Bonne, the Italian Bona and the Spanish Bonita. Some related given names or surnames include Bonaccorso, Bonaparte, Bonaventura, Bonaventure, Boniface, Bonilla, and Bueno.

The increase in usage of the name coincides with its use for characters in movie and television productions. It was the nickname used for Bonnie Blue Butler, the young daughter of Rhett Butler and Scarlett O’Hara in Margaret Mitchell’s 1935 novel Gone with the Wind and its 1939 film adaptation, because the child's eyes were said to be “as blue as the bonnie blue flag.” The name gained some notoriety via bank robbers Bonnie Parker and Clyde Barrow and the 1967 film Bonnie and Clyde made about the couple. The name was later used for Bonnie Bennett, a character in the television series The Vampire Diaries, which aired from 2009 to 2017, and for Bonnie Anderson, the toddler who inherits Andy's toys, in the 2010 film Toy Story 3 and the 2019 sequel Toy Story 4.

== People named Bonnie ==
=== Women ===
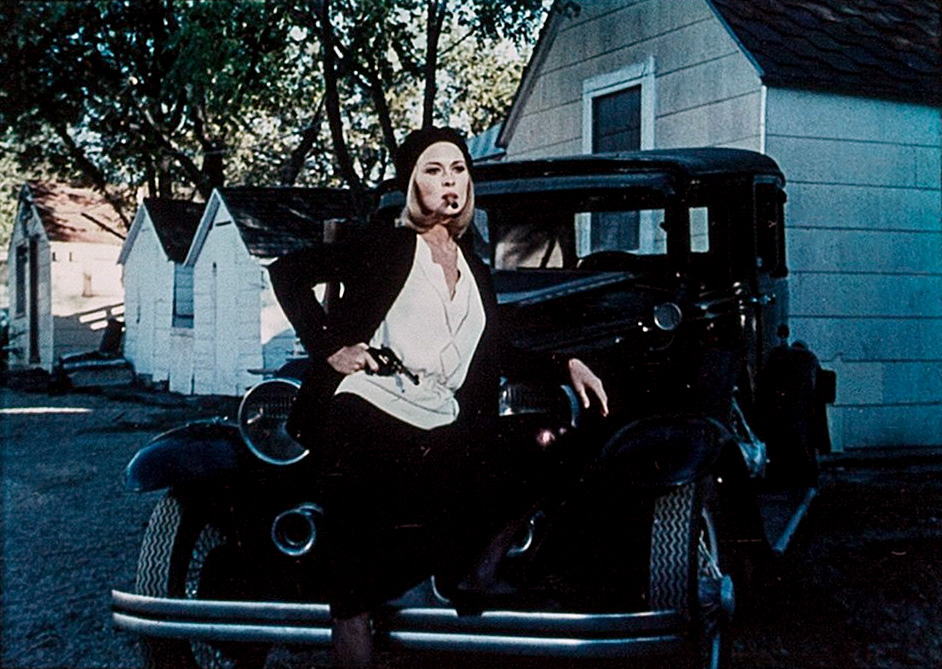
Faye Dunaway as Bonnie Parker in the 1967 film Bonnie and Clyde.

- Bonnie Aarons (born 1960), American actress
- Bonnie Ammaq, Canadian director and actress
- Bonnie Anderson (Episcopalian), American religious leader
- Bonnie Angelo (1924–2017), American journalist and author
- Bonnie Arnold, American film producer
- Bonnie August (1947–2003), American fashion designer
- Bonnie Averbach (1933–2019), American actuary, mathematician, and author
- Bonnie Ballif-Spanvill, American academic
- Bonnie Banane (born 1987), French alternative pop singer
- Bonnie Bannon (1913–1989), American actress, dancer, and model
- Bonnie Bartel, American geneticist and plant biologist
- Bonnie Bartlett (born 1929), American actress
- Bonnie Bassler (born 1962), American molecular biologist
- Bipasha Basu (born 1979), Indian actress, sometimes informally referred to as Bonnie
- Bonnie Baxter (born 1946), American artist
- Bonnie Beecher (born 1941), American activist and retired actress
- Bonnie Bedelia (born 1948), American actress
- Bonnie Berger (born c. 1964 or 1965), American mathematician and computer scientist
- Bonnie Bergin (born 1945), American canine researcher
- Bonnie Bernstein (born 1970), American sportscaster
- Bonnie Bianco (born 1963), American singer and actress
- Bonnie Bird (1914–1995), American modern dancer and dance educator
- Bonnie Bishop, American country-rock singer-songwriter
- Bonnie J. Blackburn (born 1939), American musicologist
- Bonnie Blair (born 1964), American Olympic speed skater
- Bonnie Blue (born 1999), stage name of English pornographic actress and OnlyFans content creator Tia Billinger
- Bonnie Bo (born 1982), Chinese author and screenwriter
- Bonnie Bonnell (1905–1964), American entertainer
- Bonnie Bowman, Canadian novelist
- Bonnie Bracey, American teacher and technology consultant
- Bonnie Bramlett (born 1944), American singer and sometime actress
- Bonnie Brawner (born 1988), American Paralympic volleyball player
- Bonnie Bremser (born 1939), American Beat writer
- Bonnie Brennan (born c. 1973), American auction-house executive
- Bonnie Briggs (c. 1952 or 1953–2017), Canadian affordable housing advocate and poet
- Bonnie Brinton, American speech language pathologist
- Bonnie Broel, American fashion designer
- Bonnie Brooks (born 1953), Canadian department store executive
- Bonnie Bruckheimer (born 1944), American film and television producer
- Bonnie Bryant (golfer) (born 1943), American professional golfer
- Bonnie Bryant (born 1946), American author
- Bonnie Buchanan, academic and author
- Bonnie A. Bulla, American judge
- Bonnie Bullough (1927–1996), American sexologist, nurse, and author
- Bonnie Buratti (born 1952), American planetary scientist
- Bonnie Burnard (1945–2017), Canadian short story writer and novelist
- Bonnie Burnham, American art historian
- Bonnie Burroughs, American film and television actress
- Bonnie Burstow (1945–2020), Canadian psychotherapist
- Bonnie Burton (born 1972), American author, journalist, comedian, actress, and show host
- Bonnie Campbell (politician) (born 1948), American attorney and politician
- Bonnie Jo Campbell (born 1962), American novelist and short story writer
- Bonnie Canino (born 1962), American boxer and kickboxer
- Bonnie Carroll, American army widow and activist
- Bonnie Cashin (1908–2000), American fashion designer
- Bonnie Castillo (born 1960), American nurse labor leader
- Bonnie A. Charpentier, American chemist
- Bonnie Chau, American author
- Bonnie Christensen (1951–2015), American author and illustrator
- Bonnie Clutter (1914–1959), American murder victim
- Bonnie Collura (born 1970), American artist
- Bonnie R. Cohen (born 1942), American government official
- Bonnie Comley, American theatre producer
- Bonnie Ethel Cone (1907–2003), American educator and founder of University of North Carolina at Charlotte
- Bonnie Consolo (1938–2005), American motivational speaker
- Bonnie H. Cordon (born 1964), American church leader
- Bonnie Costello (born 1950), American literary scholar
- Bonnie Crombie (born 1960), Canadian politician, formerly Member of the Canadian Parliament
- Bonnie Curtis (born 1966), American film producer
- Bonnie Dasse (born 1959), retired American track and field athlete
- Bonnie Davis (1920–1976), American R&B singer
- Bonnie Dennison, American actress
- Bonnie Devine (born 1952), Indigenous Canadian artist
- Bonnie Thornton Dill (born 1944), American feminist academic
- Bonnie Dobson (born 1940), Canadian folk music songwriter, singer, and guitarist
- Bonnie Dorr, American computer scientist
- Bonnie Dumanis, American lawyer
- Bonnie Dunbar (born 1949), retired American astronaut
- Bonnie Duran, American public health researcher
- Bonnie Elliott, Australian cinematographer
- Bonnie Erbé (born 1954), American journalist and television host
- Bonnie Erickson (born 1941), American costume designer
- Bonnie Ferri, American electrical engineer and academic administrator
- Bonnie Lynn Fields (1944–2012), American actress and Mouseketeer on The Mickey Mouse Club
- Bonnie Fleming, American physicist
- Bonnie Franklin (1944–2013), American actress
- Bonnie Fuller (born 1956), Canadian media executive
- Bonnie Gadusek (born 1963), retired American professional tennis player
- Bonnie Gallanter, American music manager
- Bonnie Garcia (born 1962), American politician
- Bonnie Garland (died 1977), American murder victim
- Bonnie Garmus (born 1957), American author
- Boronia Lucy "Bonnie" Giles (1909–1978), Australian journalist and advice columnist
- Bonnie S. Glaser, American foreign policy analyst
- Bonnie Glick, American diplomat
- Bonnie Gold (born 1948), American mathematician
- Bonnie Gordon (artist) (born 1941), American artist
- Bonnie Gordon (born 1986), American actress and parody musician
- Bonnie L. Green, American psychiatrist
- Bonnie Greer (1948–2026), American-British playwright, novelist and critic
- Bonnie Gritton, American classical pianist
- Bonnie Urquhart Gruenberg (born 1963), American photographer, author, artist, and certified nurse-midwife
- Bonnie Guitar (1923–2019), American country-pop singer
- Bonnie Hammer (born 1950), American network and studio executive
- Bonnie Hart, Australian artist, film maker, and intersex human rights activist
- Bonnie Hayes, American singer-songwriter, musician and record producer
- Bonnie HeavyRunner (died 1997), American academic
- Bonnie Henrickson (born 1963), American women's college basketball coach
- Bonnie Henry (born 1965/66), Provincial Health Officer for British Columbia
- Bonnie Hickey, Canadian politician
- Bonnie Honig (born 1959), American political theorist
- Bonnie Hunt (born 1961), American comedian, actress, director, producer, writer, host, and voice artist
- Bonnie Huy (1935–2013), American politician
- Bonnie Jenkins, American diplomat
- Bonnie L. Jensen (1938–2024), American missionary and international relations specialist
- Bonnie E. John (born 1955), American cognitive psychologist
- Bonnie Judd, Canadian animal trainer
- Bonnie S. Klapper, American lawyer
- Bonnie Sherr Klein (born 1941), American feminist filmmaker, author and disability rights activist
- Bonnie Koloc (born 1944), American folk music singer-songwriter, actress, and artist
- Bonnie Koppell, American rabbi
- Bonnie Korte, American judoka
- Bonnie Korzeniowski (1941–2019), Canadian politician
- Bonnie-Jill Laflin (born 1976), American actress, model, television personality and sportscaster
- Bonnie Langford (born 1964), British actress, dancer and entertainer
- Bonnie Law (1968–2016), Hong Kong actress and singer
- Bonnie Lee (1931–2006), American Chicago blues singer
- Bonnie Leman (1926–2010), American writer, teacher, and historian best known for founding and running Quilter's Newsletter Magazine
- Bonnie Titcomb Lewis, American politician
- Bonnie Litwiller (1937–2012), American mathematics educator
- Bonnie Loo (born 1994), Singapore-based Malaysian singer-songwriter and actress
- Bonnie Lou (1924–2015), American rock and roll and country music singer
- Bonnie Low-Kramen (born 1957), American author, speaker, teacher, and workplace activist
- Bonnie Lowenthal (born 1940), American politician
- Bonnie Lyons (born 1944), American writer and academic
- Bonnie Lysyk, Canadian government official
- Bonnie Lythgoe (born 1949), former British dancer, theatre producer and director
- Bonnie MacBird (born 1951), American actress, playwright, screenwriter and producer
- Bonnie MacLean (1939–2020), American artist
- Bonnie Maginn (1880–1964), American actress
- Bonnie Mann, American philosopher
- Bonnie Mark, American television writer and producer
- Bonnie Marranca, American critic and publisher
- Bonnie Mathieson (1945–2018), American scientist
- Bonnie Mbuli (born 1979), South African actress, businesswoman, and television personality
- Bonnie McCay (born 1941), American anthropologist
- Bonnie McElveen-Hunter (born 1950), American businesswoman, philanthropist, and diplomat
- Bonnie McFarlane (born 1973), Canadian stand-up comedian and writer
- Bonnie McKee (born 1984), award-winning American singer, songwriter, and actress
- Bonnie McKinnon, Canadian businesswoman and politician
- Bonnie Mealing (1912–2002), Australian freestyle and backstroke swimmer
- Bonnie Milligan, American musical theater performer and television actor
- Bonnie Mitchelson (born 1947), Canadian politician
- Bonnie Morgan, American actress and contortionist
- Bonnie J. Morris (born 1961), American women's studies scholar
- Bonnie Nadzam, American writer
- Bonnie Nardi, American academic
- Bonnie Nettles (1927–1985), American religious leader
- Bonnie Newman (born 1945), American businesswoman
- Bonnie Ntshalintshali (1967–1999), South African ceramicist and sculptor
- Bonnie L. Oscarson (born 1950), American 14th president of the LDS Church's Young Women organization
- Bonnie Owens (1929–2006), American country music singer
- Bonnie Parker (1910–1934), American gangster (Bonnie and Clyde)
- Bonnie Parnell (born 1946), American politician
- Bonnie Lineweaver Paul (born 1940), American lawyer and politician
- Bonnie Perry (born 1962), American Episcopal Bishop
- Bonnie Piesse (born 1983), Australian actress and singer
- Bonnie Pink (born 1973), Japanese singer, songwriter, and musician
- Bonnie Poe (1912–1993), American actress
- Bonnie Pointer (1950–2020), American R&B and disco singer (of The Pointer Sisters)
- Bonnie Burnham Potter (born 1947), United States Navy admiral
- Bonnie Prudden (1914–2011), American physical fitness pioneer, rock climber and mountaineer
- Bonnie Raitt (born 1949), American blues singer-songwriter and slide guitar player
- Bonnie Ramsey, American cystic fibrosis researcher
- Bonnie Randolph (born 1927), American professional golfer
- Bonnie Ray, American statistician and data scientist
- Bonnie Rich (born 1969), American politician
- Bonnie Richardson (born 1990), American track and field athlete
- Bonnie Rideout (born 1962), award-winning Scottish fiddler
- Bonnie Root (born c. 1971 or 1972), American actress and film producer
- Bonnie Ross (born c. 1966 or 1967), American video game developer
- Bonnie Roupé (born 1976), Swedish-born international businesswoman and social entrepreneur
- Bonnie Rychlak (born 1951), American artist, curator, and writer
- Bonnie Scott (born 1941), American actress and singer
- Bonnie Schneider, American television meteorologist and author
- Bonnie Shemie (born 1949), American-Canadian author and illustrator
- Bonnie Sherr Klein (born 1941), Canadian feminist filmmaker, author and disability rights activist
- Bonnie Sherk (1945–2021), American artist
- Bonnie Shimko, American author
- Bonnie Siegler (born 1963), American graphic designer
- Bonnie Simmons, American radio personality
- Bonnie Sloane, American pharmacology researcher
- Bonnie G. Smith (born 1940), American feminist historian
- Bonnie Somerville (born 1974), American actress and singer
- Bonnie Steinbock (born 1947), American philosopher
- Bonnie St. Claire (born 1949), Dutch singer and actress
- Bonnie St. John (born 1964), American para-alpine skier
- Bonnie Stoll (born 1952), American athlete and businesswoman
- Bonnie Story (born 1959), American choreographer
- Bonnie Strauss (born c. 1942 or 1943), American broadcast journalist and documentary filmmaker
- Bonnie Strickland (born 1936), American psychologist and academic
- Bonnie Jo Stufflebeam, American fantasy author
- Bonnie Sveen (born 1989), Australian actress
- Bonnie Taylor (disappeared 1972), American missing person
- Bonnie Lynn Tempesta (1953–2014), American baker and businesswoman
- Bonnie C. Templeton (1906–2002), American botanist
- Bonnie Tholl (born 1969), American softball player and coach
- Bonnie Tiburzi (born 1948), American aviator
- Bonnie Timmermann (born 1947), American casting director and producer
- Bonnie Tinker (1948–2009), American activist
- Bonnie Toogood (born 1997), Australian rules footballer
- Bonnie Myotai Treace (born 1956), American Zen Buddhist
- Bonnie Tsui (born 1977), American author and journalist
- Bonnie Turner (born 1940), American screenwriter and producer
- Bonnie Tyler (1951–2026), Welsh singer
- Bonnie Ann Wallace (born 1951), British and American biophysicist and biochemist
- Bonnie Watson Coleman (born 1945), American politician
- Bonnie Webber (born 1946), computational linguist
- Bonnie Westlin (born c. 1962), American lawyer and politician
- Bonnie Wetzel (1926–1965), American jazz double-bassist
- Bonnie Wittmeier (born 1966), Canadian Olympic gymnast
- Bonnie Woods, American critic of Scientology
- Bonnie Wright (born 1991), British actress, fashion model, screenwriter, director and producer
- Bonnie Young (born 1980), American soccer player
- Bonnie Zacherle (born 1946), American designer, creator of My Little Pony toy line
- Bonnie Zimmerman (born 1947), American literary critic and women's studies scholar

=== Men ===
- Bonnie 'Prince' Billy (born 1970), stage name for Will Oldham
- Bonnie Chakraborty, Indian playback singer
- Bonnie Prince Charlie (1720–1788), also known as Prince Charles Edward Stuart
- Bonnie Garcia (coach), Filipino basketball coach
- Bonnie Graham (1914–2001), American basketball player and coach
- Bonnie Bunyau Gustin (born 1999), Malaysian powerlifter
- Bonnie Hollingsworth (1895–1990), American baseball player
- Bonnie Izzard (1908–1990), Australian rules footballer
- Bonnie Lubega (born 1929), Ugandan novelist, fiction writer, lexicographer
- Bonnie Serrell (1920–1996), American baseball player
- Bonnie Sloan (born 1948), American professional football player
- Bonnie Stewart (1914–1994), American mathematician
- Bonnie Tan (born 1972), Filipino basketball coach
- Bonnie Triyana (born 1979), Indonesian historian, politician, and museum curator

== Surname ==
- Joe Bonnie, Irish drummer
- Richard Bonnie, American professor
- Robert Bonnie, Under Secretary of Agriculture for Farm Production and Conservation

== Fictional characters ==
- Anne Bonnie, an adventure comic character
- Bonnie Anderson, in the Toy Story franchise
- Bonnie Bennett, from the television series The Vampire Diaries
- Princess Bonnibel 'Bonnie' Bubblegum, from the animated franchise Adventure Time
- Bonnie Hopps, a character in the Zootopia franchise
- Bonnie Swanson, from the animated series Family Guy
- Bonnie The Bunny, a character in the horror game Five Nights at Freddy's by Scott Cawthon
- Bonnie Winterbottom, a character in the TV series How to Get Away with Murder

== See also ==
- Bonny (disambiguation)
- Bonaventure (disambiguation)
