= Bona (name) =

- Language: Latin

Origin
- Meaning: good

Other names
- Related names: Bonita, Bonnie

Bona or Bonna is both a given name and a surname. It is derived from the Latin bonus, meaning good.

Notable people with the name include:

== Mononym ==
- Bona (singer) (born 1995), member of South Korean girl group WJSN
- Bona of Pisa (c. 1156–1207), Italian saint
- Bona of Savoy (1449–1503), duchess of Savoy
- Bipasha Basu (born 1979), Indian actress, sometimes nicknamed "Bona"

== Given name ==
- Bona Arsenault, Canadian politician
- Bonna Daix Wescoat, American art historian
- Bona Dussault, Canadian politician
- Bona Medeiros, Brazilian lawyer and politician
- Bonna Mirza (born 1975), Bangladeshi actress
- Bona Mugabe (born 1988), Zimbabwean businesswoman
- Bonna Søndberg (born 1933), Danish operatic soprano and singing educator
- Bona Septano (born 1987), Indonesian badminton player
- Princess Bona Margherita of Savoy-Genoa (1896–1971), Princess Konrad of Bavaria
- Bona Malwal (born 1928), South Sudanese journalist and politician.
- Bona Sforza (1493–1557), Queen of Poland and Grand Duchess of Lithuania
- Bona Tibertelli de Pisis (1926–2000), a painter, writer and poet who was married to André Pieyre de Mandiargues

== Surname ==
- Adem Bona (born 2003), Nigerian-Turkish basketball player
- Alberto Bona (born 1978), Italian actor and film maker
- André Bona (born 1990), French footballer
- Annalisa Bona (born 1982), Italian tennis player
- Anthony Bonna, American politician
- Concepción Bona (1824–1901), Dominican activist and teacher
- Damien Bona (1955–2012), American film historian
- Daniel Bona (born 1969), Romanian footballer
- Daniele Dalla Bona (born 1983), Italian footballer
- Diego Natale Bona, Italian bishop
- Dominique Bona (born 1953), French writer
- Filippo Bona, Italian prelate
- Francesco Bona (born 1983), Italian long-distance runner
- Gino Bona (born 1973), American marketing professional
- Giovanni Bona (1609–1674), Cistercian cardinal and author
- Giovanni Dalla Bona (born 1951), Italian cyclist
- Giovanni Serafino Bona (1591/92–1658), Croatian politician and poet
- Giovanni Leonardo Di Bona (1542–1587), Italian chess player
- Henriette Bonna (c.1500-c.1537), Protestant activist from Geneva
- Jerry L. Bona (born 1945), American mathematician
- Juanjo Bona, Spanish singer
- Julie de Bona (born 1980), French actress
- Kina Bona, Papua New Guinean judge
- Lee Bo-na (born 1981), South Korean sports shooter
- Luciano Dalla Bona, Italian cyclist
- Mary Jo Bona, American literary scholar
- Miklos Bona, Hungarian-American mathematician
- Narve Bonna, Norwegian ski jumper
- Oscar De Bona (born 1948), Italian politician
- Pasquale Bona (1808–1878), Italian composer
- Patrick Bona, Italian ice hockey player
- Richard Bona (born 1967), Cameroonian jazz musician and bassist
- Samuel de Bona (born 1990), Brazilian swimmer
- Samuele Dalla Bona (born 1981), Italian footballer
- Stanislaus Bona (1888–1967), American Roman Catholic bishop
- Tommaso Bona, Italian Renaissance painter
- Valerio Bona (c. 1560 – c. 1620), Italian Baroque composer
- Vin Di Bona (born 1944), television producer
- Zoltán Bóna, Hungarian politician

== See also ==
- Bona (disambiguation)
- Lee Bo-Na (born 1981), a female South Korean sports shooter
