= Bonita (name) =

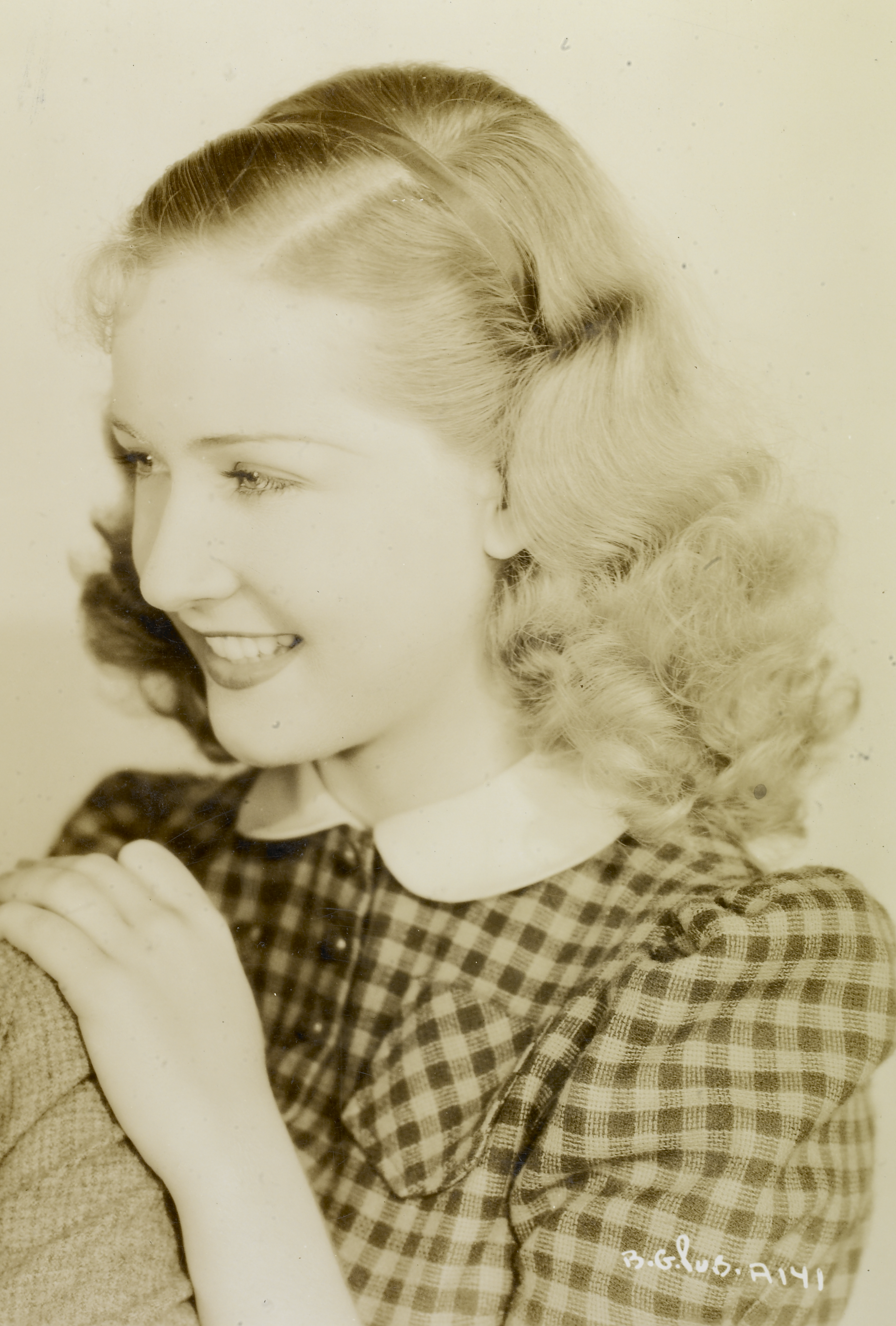
- Bonita Granville was one well-known bearer of the name.
- Gender: Female

Origin
- Origin: Spanish
- Meaning: "Pretty, beautiful, lively"

Other names
- Related names: Bona, Bonnie, Nita

Bonita is a feminine given name of Spanish origin.

== List of people with the name ==
- Bonita Anthony (born 1967/1968), American engineer, university administrator, and politician
- Bonita “Bonnie” Langford (born 1964), English actress, dancer, singer, and television personality
- Bonita Boyd (born 1949), American flutist, soloist, pedagogue, and professor of music
- Bonita Brown, American lawyer and academic administrator
- Bonita C. Stewart (born 1957), African-American marketing- and sales executive, consultant, media personality, and author
- Bonita Ely (born 1946), Australian multidisciplinary artist
- Bonita Fields (1944–2012), American actress
- Bonita Friedericy (born 1961), American actress
- Bonita Granville (1923–1988), American actress and producer
- Bonita H. Valien (1912–2011), African-American sociologist
- Bonita Jacobs, American former university president
- Bonita Lawrence, Canadian Mi’kmaw writer, scholar, and professor
- Bonita Lubliner (born 1998), German actress
- Bonita Lythgoe (born 1949), English producer, director, and former dancer
- Bonita Mabo (c. 1943–2018), Australian educator and civil rights activist
- Bonita Mersiades, Australian corporate affairs practitioner, sports administrator, and writer
- Bonita Norris (born 1987), English mountaineer
- Bonita Pietila (born 1953), American casting director and producer
- Bonita Sharma, Nepali health- and nutrition activist
- Bonita Sue Dunbar (born 1948), American zoologist, academic, and former professor
- Bonita V. Saunders, American mathematician
- Bonita Wa Wa Calachaw Nuñez (1888–1972), Native American painter, activist, and writer
- Bonita Williams, British West-Indian politician, poet, and civil rights activist in America
- Bonita Zarrillo (born 1965/1966), Canadian politician

== Fictional characters ==
- Bonita Juarez, real name of Firebird, in the US Marvel Comics

== See also ==
- Bonita (disambiguation)
