= Bo (given name) =

Bo is a given name of Norse and Chinese origin.

== Background ==
The Norse roots of Bo are in the Scandinavian languages Danish, Norwegian, Swedish. It is associated with the present-day Scandinavian word 'bo', meaning "live", as in exist/living (related to life), and reside/nest (related to dwelling). Bo is also short for names such as Beaufort, Beauregard, Bonita, Bonnie, Robert, or James.

The Chinese given name Bo can be spelled as Bō. The meaning can be 波 (bō) "wave" and other meanings depending on the Chinese characters used. It is also a common Chinese surname.

== People with the name ==
Notable people with the name include:

=== Given name ===
- Bo Allan (born 2006), Australian footballer
- Bo Anderson, birth name of American Brazilian DJ and producer Maga Bo
- Bo Bergman (1869–1967), Swedish poet
- Bo Bichette (born 1998), Major League Baseball player
- Bo Boustedt (1868–1939), Swedish Army lieutenant general
- Bo Bowling (born 1987), American football player
- Bo Bragason (born 2004), English actress
- Bo Brasseur (born 1998), Belgian long jumper
- Bo Brinkman (born 1956), American actor, director, and producer
- Bo Carpelan (1926–2011), Finnish poet and author
- Bo Danske, 13th-century Danish philosopher
- Bo Ehnbom (1899–1985), Swedish military engineer
- Bo Ericson (athlete) (1919–1970), Swedish hammer thrower
- Bo Goldman (1932–2023), American writer, Broadway playwright, and screenwriter
- Bo Gunge (born 1964), Danish composer
- Bo Hamburger (born 1970), Danish cyclist
- Bo Hansson (1943–2010), Swedish musician
- Bo Heinebäck (1937–2021), Swedish diplomat
- Bo Holmberg (1942–2010), Swedish politician
- Bo Järnstedt (1911–1992), Swedish diplomat
- Bo Johansson (born 1942), Swedish former football player and current football coach
- Bo Kälfors (1932–2007), Swedish diplomat
- Bo Larsson (1944–2023), Swedish football midfielder/striker
- Bo Ljungberg (1911–1984), Swedish pole vaulter
- Bo Melton (born 1999), American football player
- Bo Levi Mitchell (born 1990), Canadian football quarterback
- Bo Lundgren (born 1947), Swedish politician
- Bo Mossberg, Swedish author and illustrator of Den nya nordiska floran
- Bo Nickal (born 1996), American wrestler and mixed martial artist
- Bo Nix (born 2000), American football quarterback
- Bo Persson (table tennis), Swedish table tennis player
- Bo Petersson, (born 1946), Swedish football manager and former football player
- Bo Randall (1909–1989), American knifemaker
- Bo Johan Renck (born 1966), Swedish director of music videos, TV and film
- Bo Richter (born 2000), American football player
- Bo Rybeck (1935–2019), Swedish physician
- Bo Scarbrough (born 1996), American football player
- Bo Svenson (born 1941), Swedish-born American actor
- Bo Svensson (born 1979), Danish football player
- Bo Toresson (born 1939), Swedish politician
- Bo Varenius (1918–1996), Swedish major general
- Bo Vestergaard (born 1965), Danish lightweight rower
- Bo Widerberg (1930–1997), Swedish film director
- Bo Wilén (1944–2023), Swedish diplomat
- Htun Aeindra Bo, Burmese actress and singer born Mi Mi Khine in 1966

=== Nickname ===
- Bo Belinsky (1936–2001), American Major League Baseball pitcher
- Bo Bice (born 1975), American singer who placed second on the fourth season of American Idol
- Bo Bruce (born 1984), English singer-songwriter
- Bo Bolinger (1932–2011), American football player
- Bo Brown (1906–1996), American cartoonist
- Bo Burnham (born 1990), American singer songwriter/comedian
- Bo Burris (born 1944), American National Football League player
- Bo Callaway (1927–2014), American politician and businessman
- Bo Cornell (born 1949), American National Football League player
- Bo Davidson (born 2002), American Major League Baseball player
- Bo Derek (born 1956), American actress
- Bo Diddley (1928–2008), American R&B and Chicago blues musician
- Bo Dupp, a ring name, along with Otto Schwanz, of American professional wrestler William Happer (born 1972)
- Bo Goldman (1932–2023), American writer, Broadway playwright, and screenwriter
- Bo Gritz (1939–2026), American US Army officer, and perennial candidate
- Bo Halldórsson (born 1951), Icelandic pop singer
- Bo Hines (born 1995), American football player and politician
- Bo Hopkins (1938–2022), American actor
- Bo Horvat (born 1995), Canadian hockey player
- Bo Jackson (born 1962), American National Football League and Major League Baseball player
- Bo Kimble (born 1966), American basketball player
- Bo Lamar (born 1951), American basketball player
- Bo McCalebb (born 1985), American-Macedonian professional basketball player
- Bo Mitchell (born 1970), representative in the Tennessee House of Representatives
- Bo Outlaw (born 1971), American National Basketball Association player
- Bo Pelini (born 1967), American college football head coach
- Bo Rein (1945–1980), American, football player, baseball player, and football coach
- Bo Roberson (1935–2001), American, track and field athlete, and football player
- Bo Robinson (born 1956), American National Football League player
- Bo Ryan (born 1947), American college basketball coach and former player
- Bo Schembechler (1929–2006), American football player, college head coach and administrator
- Bo Snerdley, pseudonym of James Golden (radio personality)
- Bo Songvisava (born 1979/1980), Thai chef
- Bo Welch (born 1951), American production designer, art director, film and TV director, actor

=== Chinese given name Bō ===
- Chu Bo (born 1944), Chinese politician
- Hu Bo (1988–2017), Chinese film director
- Qiu Bo (born 1993), Chinese diver
- Sun Bo (born 1961), Chinese business executive and engineer

=== Chinese surname Bo ===
- Bo Xilai, Chinese former politician

== Fictional characters ==
- Bo Adams, main character in the Believe TV series
- Bo Abobo from the video game Double Dragon
- Bo, a character from the video game Brawl Stars
- Bo Brady, in the soap opera Days of Our Lives
- Bo Buchanan, in the soap opera One Life to Live
- Bo Callahan, main draft prospect in the movie Draft Day
- Bo Cocky, the main protagonist in the 2006 film Supertwink
- Bo (Lost Girl) (Bo Dennis), protagonist of the Canadian TV series Lost Girl
- Bo Duke, one of the main characters in The Dukes of Hazzard TV series
- Bo Monkey, a main character in the Nickelodeon TV series Fresh Beat Band of Spies
- Bo Orlov, a character in the Netflix series Grand Army
- Little Bo Peep, from a nursery rhyme
  - Bo Peep, in the Toy Story franchise
- Bo' Rai Cho, in the Mortal Kombat video game series
- Bo Sheep, in the U.S. Acres comic strip
- Bo Sinclair, in the 2005 film House of Wax
- Bo, a cheetah from the British animated TV series Mama Mirabelle's Home Movies
- Bo, a cartoon character in Muse magazine
- Bo, an orphan named "Boniface" in the Cornelia Funke novel The Thief Lord
- Bo, the main protagonist of the 2017 animated film The Star
- Bo Hess from the movie Signs
- Bo, the main protagonist in the animated TV show Bo on the Go!
- Bo Baxter, character in Postcards from Buster and Arthur

== See also ==
- Beau (name), given name and surname
