= Bonnie Litwiller =

American mathematics educator

Bonnie Helen Litwiller (February 14, 1937 – January 27, 2012) was an American mathematics educator and textbook author, who worked as a professor of mathematics at the University of Northern Iowa.

== Life ==
Litwiller was born on February 14, 1937, in Morton, Illinois. She studied mathematics education at Illinois State University, earning bachelor's and master's degrees in 1959 and 1960. She earned a second master's degree in 1965 and a doctorate (Ed.D.) in 1968 at Indiana University School of Education. Her doctoral dissertation was Enrichment: A Method of Changing the Attitudes of Prospective Elementary Teachers Toward Mathematics.

After working for seven years as a high school teacher in Peoria, Illinois, she joined the faculty of the University of Northern Iowa, where she spent the rest of her career, educating a large fraction of the mathematics teachers in Iowa. She served as president of the Iowa Council of Teachers of Mathematics for 1978–1979.

After her retirement in 2000, she returned to Morton. She continued to publish scholarly work on mathematics education into her retirement, eventually amassing over 1000 publications.

She died on January 27, 2012, of myelofibrosis.

== Books ==
Litwiller's books include:

- Activities for the Maintenance of Computational Skills and the Discovery of Patterns (with David R. Duncan, National Council of Teachers of Mathematics, 1980)
- Problem Solving with Number Patterns (with David R. Duncan, School Science and Mathematics Association, 1987)
- Curriculum and Evaluation Standards for School Mathematics: First-Grade Book (with Miriam Leiva, National Council of Teachers of Mathematics, 1991)
- Making Sense of Fractions, Ratios, and Proportions (edited with George Bright, 2002 Yearbook of the National Council of Teachers of Mathematics)
- Navigating through Problem Solving and Reasoning in Grade 3 (with Karol L. Yeatts, Michael T. Battista, Sally Mayberry, Denisse R. Thompson, Judith S. Zawojewski, and Peggy A. House, National Council of Teachers of Mathematics, 2004)

== Recognition ==
In 2003, the Iowa Council of Teachers of Mathematics gave Litwiller their Lifetime Achievement Award. In 2004, the Indiana University School of Education gave her their Distinguished Alumni Award.

An endowed scholarship in her name is offered by the Illinois State University to students in mathematics education. Another scholarship, at the University of Northern Iowa, was funded by a bequest from Litwiller's estate. In conjunction with the American Red Cross, the United Church of Christ of Morton, Illinois held a series of annual blood drives in her memory.
