= Bonne =

Bonne or Bonné can refer to:

== People ==
=== Given name ===
- Bonne of Armagnac (1399 – 1430/35), eldest daughter of Bernard VII, Count of Armagnac and of Bonne of Berry
- Bonne of Artois, (1396-1425), daughter of Philip of Artois, Count of Eu and of Marie, Duchess of Auvergne.
- Bonne of Berry (1362/1365 – 1435), daughter of John, Duke of Berry and of Joanna of Armagnac
- Bonne of Bohemia (AKA Jutta of Luxemburg, 1315–1349), first wife of King John II of France
  - Psalter of Bonne de Luxembourg, probably executed for Bonne of Bohemia
- Bonne of Bourbon (1341-1402), daughter of Peter I, Duke of Bourbon and of Isabella of Valois, who acted as regent of Savoy
- Bonne Marie Félicité de Montmorency-Luxembourg (1739-1823), French courtier, Duchesse de Serent
- Bonne de Pons d'Heudicourt (1641-1709), royal mistress of Louis XIV of France
- Yasnyiar Bonne Gea (born 1982), Indonesian female professional surfer

=== Surname ===
- Daisurami Bonne (born 1988), Cuban track and field sprint athlete who specialises in the 400 metres
- Félix Bonne (c. 1939—2017), Cuban engineering professor and dissident
- François de Bonne, Duke of Lesdiguières (1543-1626), soldier of the French Wars of Religion and Constable of France
- Idalmis Bonne (born 1971), Cuban sprinter
- Jon Bonné (born 1972), American wine writer,
- Macauley Bonne (born 1995), English professional footballer
- Mirko Bonné (born 1965), German writer and translator
- Pierre-Amable de Bonne (1758-1816), seigneur, lawyer, judge and political figure in Lower Canada
- Rémy Bonne (born 1989), French professional footballer
- Rigobert Bonne (1727–1795), French cartographer
- Shirley Bonne (born 1934), American television actress
- Yowlys Bonne (born 1983), Cuban freestyle wrestler who competed at the 2012 Summer Olympics

== Places ==
- Bonne, Haute-Savoie, a commune in the Haute-Savoie department and Rhône-Alpes region of eastern France
- Bonne Bay, a bay in Newfoundland, Canada
  - Bonne Bay Marine Station, a marine ecology research and teaching facility on Bonne Bay
- Bonne Glacier, Antarctica

== Other uses ==
- Bonne projection, a pseudoconical equal-area map projection
- La Bonne (AKA Corruption), a 1986 erotic film directed by Salvatore Samperi

== See also ==
- Bon (disambiguation)
- Bonnes (disambiguation)
- Bonnie (disambiguation)
- Guillaume de Bonne-Carrere (1754-1825), French diplomat
- Jacques Bonne-Gigault de Bellefonds (1698–1746), Archbishop of Arles 1741-1746
