= Mona Mostafa Mohamed =

Egyptian cancer biologist

- منى مصطفى محمد
- Education: Cairo University (BS 1991, PhD 2002); Wayne State University (Postdoc)
- Known for: Founder and Director of the Cancer Biology Research Laboratory (CBRL) at Cairo University
- Awards: Avon Foundation-AACR International Scholar Award (2005); U.S. State Department MENA Women in Science Hall of Fame (2012); Arab Women Organization Prize in Science and Technology (2014)
- Scientific career
- Fields: Breast cancer biology, inflammatory breast cancer, tumor microenvironment, cathepsin enzymes

Mona Mostafa Mohamed is an Egyptian doctor and head of the Cancer Biology Research Laboratory at Cairo University in Giza, Egypt. In 2005 she was granted the Avon Foundation-AACR International Scholar Award for her dedication to breast cancer research. Mohamed is known for her research on locally activated breast cancer, metastatic breast cancer, and inflammatory breast cancer.

== Education and career ==
Mohamed has a B.S. (1991) and a Ph.D. (2002) from Cairo University. She was a postdoctoral researcher at Wayne State School of Medicine from 2005 until 2007. In 2007, she was awarded a start up fund from the Avon Foundation to create the first research lab in Egypt specific to studying breast cancer biology which is located at Cairo University. As of 2022 she is an associate professor at Cairo University.

Mohamed is known for her work in breast cancer, particularly on the role of multi functional enzymes. Her research has examined the conditions for women with inflammatory breast cancer in Egypt, and white blood cells from patients with inflammatory breast cancer.

== Selected publications ==
- Mohamed, Mona Mostafa; Sloane, Bonnie F. (2006). "Cysteine cathepsins: multifunctional enzymes in cancer". Nature Reviews Cancer. 6 (10): 764–775. doi:10.1038/nrc1949. ISSN 1474-175X. PMID 16990854. S2CID 26463930.
- Mohamed, Mona M.; El-Ghonaimy, Eslam A.; Nouh, Mohamed A.; Schneider, Robert J.; Sloane, Bonnie F.; El-Shinawi, Mohamed (2014-01-01). "Cytokines secreted by macrophages isolated from tumor microenvironment of inflammatory breast cancer patients possess chemotactic properties". The International Journal of Biochemistry & Cell Biology. 46: 138–147. doi:10.1016/j.biocel.2013.11.015. ISSN 1357-2725. PMC 3928544. PMID 24291763.
- Ibrahim, Sherif Abdelaziz; Gadalla, Ramy; El-Ghonaimy, Eslam A.; Samir, Omnia; Mohamed, Hossam Taha; Hassan, Hebatallah; Greve, Burkhard; El-Shinawi, Mohamed; Mohamed, Mona Mostafa; Götte, Martin (2017). "Syndecan-1 is a novel molecular marker for triple negative inflammatory breast cancer and modulates the cancer stem cell phenotype via the IL-6/STAT3, Notch and EGFR signaling pathways". Molecular Cancer. 16 (1): 57. doi:10.1186/s12943-017-0621-z. ISSN 1476-4598. PMC 5341174. PMID 28270211.
- Nouh, Mohamed A; Mohamed, Mona M; El-Shinawi, Mohamed; Shaalan, Mohamed A; Cavallo-Medved, Dora; Khaled, Hussein M; Sloane, Bonnie F (2011). "Cathepsin B: a potential prognostic marker for inflammatory breast cancer". Journal of Translational Medicine. 9 (1): 1. doi:10.1186/1479-5876-9-1. ISSN 1479-5876. PMC 3022726. PMID 21199580.

== Awards and honors ==
In 2005, Mohamed won the Avon Foundation International Scholar Award in Breast Cancer Research. In 2012, she was admitted into the United States' State Departments' Women in Science Hall of Fame for the Middle East and North Africa. In 2014 she was awarded the Arab Women Organization Prize in Science and Technology.
