= Bonnes =

Bonnes may refer to:

- Bonnes, Charente, a commune in the department of Charente, France
- Bonnes, Vienne, a commune in the department of Vienne, France
- Étienne Bonnes (1894 – after 1924), French rugby union player who competed in the 1924 Summer Olympics
- Olivier Bonnes (born 1990), international footballer of Niger
- Stéphane Bonnes (born 1978), French former football player
- Les Bonnes (The Maids), a 1947 play by Jean Genet

== See also ==
- Bonnes Mares, an Appellation d'origine contrôlée (AOC) and Grand Cru vineyard for red wine in the Côte de Nuits subregion of Burgundy
- Eaux-Bonnes, a commune in the Pyrénées-Atlantiques department in south-western France
- Les bonnes causes (Don't Tempt the Devil), a 1963 French-Italian crime film written and directed by Christian-Jaque
- Les Bonnes Femmes, a 1960 French comedic drama film directed by Claude Chabrol
- Bonne (disambiguation)
