= Problem Solving Through Recreational Mathematics =

Mathematics textbook

- Author: Bonnie Averbach and Orin Chein
- Genre: Mathematics
- Publisher: W. H. Freeman and Company
- Publication date: 1980

Problem Solving Through Recreational Mathematics is a textbook in mathematics on problem solving techniques and their application to problems in recreational mathematics, intended as a textbook for general education courses in mathematics for liberal arts education students. It was written by Bonnie Averbach and Orin Chein, published in 1980 by W. H. Freeman and Company, and reprinted in 2000 by Dover Publications.

== Audience and reception ==
Problem Solving Through Recreational Mathematics is based on mathematics courses taught by the authors, who were both mathematics professors at Temple University. It follows a principle in mathematics education popularized by George Pólya, of focusing on techniques for mathematical problem solving, motivated by the idea that by doing mathematics rather than being told about its "history, culture, or applications", liberal arts education students (for whom this might be their only college-level mathematics course) can gain a better idea of the nature of mathematics. By concentrating on problems in recreational mathematics, Averbach and Chein hope to motivate students by the fun aspect of these problems. However, this approach may also lead the students to lose sight of the important applications of the mathematics they learn, and contains little to no material on mathematical proof.

The book's exercises include some with detailed solutions, some with less-detailed answers, and some that provide only hints to the solution, providing flexibility to instructors in using this book as a textbook. Cartoons and other illustrations of the concepts help make the material more inviting to students.

As well as for general education at the college level, this book could also be used to help prepare students going into mathematics education, and for mathematics appreciation for secondary school students. It could also be used as a reference by secondary school mathematics teachers in providing additional examples for their students, or as personal reading for anyone teenaged or older who is interested in mathematics. Alternatively, reviewer Murray Klamkin suggests using the books of Polyá for these purposes, but adding Problem Solving Through Recreational Mathematics as a supplement to these books.

== Topics ==
The book begins with an introductory chapter on problem-solving techniques in general, including six problems to motivate these techniques. The rest of the book is organized into eight thematic chapters, each of which can stand alone or be read in an arbitrary order. The topics of these chapters are:

- Logic puzzles, especially focusing on "Knights and Knaves" types of puzzles in which some characters are truthful while others answer only falsely.
- Word problems involving time and motion, with continuous variables and with solutions using algebra.
- Number theory, particularly focusing on Diophantine equations, continuing the theme of word problems but with discrete variables for numbers of people, goods, or costs, and also including material on divisibility, prime numbers, and the Chinese remainder theorem.
- Numeral systems and cryptarithms.
- Graph theory, including Euler tours and Hamiltonian cycles.
- Game theory and combinatorial game theory, including material on games of perfect information and on the games of tic tac toe, nim, and hex.
- Solitaire games and puzzles, including polyominoes, peg solitaire, and the 15 puzzle.
- A collection of leftover problems which did not fit into any of the other chapters.
