= Beau (name) =

Beau (/boʊ/ BOH) is a given name, nickname and surname. Notable people with the name include:

== Given name ==
- Beau Atkinson (born 2004), American football player
- Beau Belga (born 1986), Filipino basketball player
- Beau Bennett (born 1991), American hockey player
- Beau Benzschawel (born 1996) American football player
- Beau Bokan (born 1981), American musician and songwriter
- Beau Boulter (born 1942), former Congressman from Texas and political lobbyist
- Beau Brade (born 2002), American football player
- Beau Brady (born 1981), Australian actor
- Beau Brinkley (born 1990), American football player
- Beau Burchell (born 1978), American musician and record producer
- Beau Casson (born 1982), Australian cricketer
- Beau Champion (born 1986), Australian Rugby League player
- Beau Falloon (born 1987), Australian Rugby League player
- Beau Garrett (born 1982), American actress
- Beau Henry (born 1990), Australian Rugby League footballer
- Beau Hoopman (born 1980), American rower and Olympic gold medalist
- Beau Kazer (1951–2014), Canadian actor
- Beau Klaver, American politician
- Beau Landry (born 1991), Canadian football player
- Beau Leroux (born 2003), American association football player
- Beau Maister (born 1986), Australian rules footballer
- Beau Matthews, Australian para-swimmer
- Beau McCoy (born 1980), Nebraska state senator
- Beau McDonald (born 1979), Australian rules footballer
- Beau Mirchoff (born 1989), American-born Canadian actor
- Beau Nunn (born 1995), American football player
- Beau Pribula (born 2003), American football player
- Beau Robinson (born 1986), Australian rugby union footballer
- Beau Ryan (born 1985), Australian Rugby League player and comedian
- Beau Sia (born 1976), American poet
- Beau Smith (born 1954), American comic book writer and columnist
- Beau Stephens (born 2002), American football player
- Beau Waters (born 1986), Australian rules footballer
- Beau Wootton (born 1998), Australian para-cyclist

== Nickname ==
- Beau Bayh (born 1995), American politician from Indiana
- Beau Bell (1907–1977), Major League Baseball outfielder
- Beau Biden (1969–2015), American lawyer, soldier, and politician
- Beau Bridges (born 1941), American actor
- Beau Brummell (1778–1840), arbiter of men's fashion in Regency England
- Beau Correll (born 1982), American lawyer and political commentator
- Beau Nash (1674–1762), dandy and leader of fashion in 18th-century Britain

== Surname ==
- Heinie Beau (1911–1987), American jazz composer, arranger, saxophonist, and clarinetist

== Fictional characters ==
- Michael "Beau" Geste, the protagonist of the novel Beau Geste and numerous adaptations
- Beau, a paranoid man portrayed by Joaquin Phoenix in the comedy horror movie Beau Is Afraid
- Beau Felton, a homicide detective on the American television show Homicide: Life on the Street
- Beauregard "Beau" Gray, a supporting character in the video game Red Dead Redemption 2
- Beau Richardson, a villain and murder victim on the crime/mystery serial The Edge of Night
- Beau, a mining engine who works near the Grand Canyon from Thomas and Friends: Big World! Big Adventures!
- Beau, exterminator and Teddy's ex-boyfriend from Good Luck Charlie
- Beau Bennett, the father of Colt and Rooster in the series "The Ranch"

== See also ==
- Bo (given name)
- Bo (surname)
