= Guillaume de Bonne-Carrere =

Guillaume de Bonne-Carrere (13 February 1754 – 1825), French diplomat, was born at Muret in Languedoc. He began his career in the army, but soon entered the diplomatic service under Vergennes.

A friend of Honoré Gabriel Riqueti, comte de Mirabeau and of Charles François Dumouriez, he became very active in the French Revolution, and Dumouriez re-established for him the title of director-general of the department of foreign affairs (March 1792). He remained at the ministry, preserving the habits of the diplomacy of the old regime, until December 1792, when he was sent to Belgium as agent of the republic, but he was involved in the treason of Dumouriez and was arrested on 2 April 1793. To justify himself, he published an account of his conduct from the beginning of the Revolution. He was freed from prison in July 1794. Napoleon did not trust him, and gave him only some unimportant missions.

After 1815 Bonne-Carrere retired into private life, directing a profitable business in public carriages between Paris and Versailles.
