= Bonnie Gordon (artist) =

American artist

- Born: 1941; Buffalo, New York
- Known for: Photography, printmaking, installations

Bonnie Gordon (b. 1941, Buffalo, New York) is an American artist known for her cyanotype prints and installations.

Gordon attended Syracuse University and the Rochester Institute of Technology. Her artist's books are published by the Visual Studies Workshop.

Her work is in the International Center of Photography, the Museum of Modern Art, the National Gallery of Canada, and the National Museum of Women in the Arts (NMWA),
