= Miriam Leiva =

Cuban-American mathematician

Miriam Almaguer Leiva is a Cuban-American mathematician and mathematics educator, the first American Hispanic woman to earn a doctorate in mathematics and mathematics education. She is the Bonnie Cone Distinguished Professor for Teaching Emerita in the Department of Mathematics at the University of North Carolina at Charlotte, and the founder of TODOS: Mathematics for All, an organization devoted to advocacy for and encouragement of Latinx students in mathematics. She is also an author of many secondary-school mathematics textbooks.

== Education and career ==
Leiva moved from Cuba to the US as a teenager in the 1950s. She did her undergraduate studies at Guilford College, graduating in 1961, and was initially denied admission for graduate study in mathematics at the University of North Carolina for being a woman. Nevertheless, she persisted, and earned a master's degree there in 1966 under the mentorship of Alfred Brauer, with a thesis on Elementary estimates for the least positive primitive root modulo p^{r}.

After finishing her master's degree, she became a secondary school mathematics teacher. Later, she obtained a teaching position at the University of North Carolina, and while teaching there completed her doctorate in mathematics and mathematics education through a distance education program at Union Institute & University.

== Recognition ==
In 2008, TODOS gave Leiva their Iris Carl Equity and Leadership Award. In 2013 the National Council of Teachers of Mathematics (NCTM) gave her the inaugural Kay Gilliland Equity Lecture Award for "contributions to equity in mathematics education". In 2014 the NCTM gave her the Mathematics Education Trust Lifetime Achievement Award for Distinguished Service to Mathematics Education.
