= Richard Bonnie =

American law professor

Richard J. Bonnie
- Education: Johns Hopkins University (BA); University of Virginia School of Law (LLB)
- Awards: See below
- Scientific career
- Fields: Law, Psychiatry, Public Policy, Public Health
- Institutions: University of Virginia School of Law

Richard J. Bonnie is the Harrison Foundation Professor of Law and Medicine, Professor of Public Policy, Professor of Psychiatry and Neurobehavioral Science, and Director of the Institute of Law, Psychiatry and Public Policy at the University of Virginia and the University of Virginia School of Law. He teaches and writes about criminal law, bioethics, and public policies relating to mental health, substance abuse, aging and public health.

== Education ==
Bonnie received his Bachelor of Arts from Johns Hopkins University in 1966. He received his L.L.B. from University of Virginia in 1969.

== Career ==
Bonnie has been actively involved in public service throughout his career. Among many other positions, he has been associate director of the National Commission on Marihuana and Drug Abuse (1971–73); secretary of the first National Advisory Council on Drug Abuse (1975–80); chair of Virginia's State Human Rights Committee responsible for protecting rights of persons with mental disabilities (1979–85), chief advisor for the ABA Criminal Justice Mental Health Standards Project (1981–88) and Chair of the Commission on Mental Health Law Reform established by the Chief Justice of Virginia (2006–11).

Bonnie has served as an advisor to the American Psychiatric Association Council on Psychiatry and Law since 1979, received the American Psychiatric Association's Isaac Ray Award in 1998 for contributions to the field of forensic psychiatry, and was awarded a special presidential commendation in 2003 for his contributions to American psychiatry. He has also served on three MacArthur Foundation research networks — on Mental Health and the Law (1988–96), Mandated Community Treatment (2000-2010) and Law and Neuroscience (since 2008).

In 1991, Bonnie was elected to the National Academy of Medicine. He has chaired numerous National Academy studies on subjects ranging from elder mistreatment to underage drinking, including the landmark report, Ending the Tobacco Problem: A Blueprint for the Nation (2007). Most recently, he chaired major studies on juvenile justice reform (2013) and the health and well-being of young adults (2014).

== Research ==
Bonnie has authored many papers and books on the subjects of criminal law, bioethics and public policies relating to mental health, substance abuse, aging and public health.

== Awards and honors ==
In 2007, Bonnie received the University of Virginia's highest honor, the Thomas Jefferson Award. He received the Yarmolinsky Medal in 2002 for his contributions to the National Academies. Bonnie was elected to the American Law Institute in 2014.
