= Henriette Bonna =

Protestant activist

- Born: 1500; Geneva
- Died: 1537 (aged 36–37)

Henriette Bonna also known as Henriette Baudichon (c.1500-c.1537) was a Protestant activist from Geneva.

== Biography ==
Henriette Bonna was born around 1500 in Geneva. She was the daughter of councilor Aymon Bonna and was one of the elites of the city of Geneva.

On October 3, 1527, she married Jean de La Maisonneuve also known as Jean de Baudichon. In a letter addressed to her husband, she feminized her husband's name and signed 'Henriette Baudichone'.

Bonna was involved in the conflicts that preceded the city's accession to the Reformation between 1535 and 1536. Bonna's political and religious stance is captured in judicial records, particularly during her husband's trial in Lyon for heresy. Witnesses testified that in Geneva, she openly demonstrated her opposition to Catholic practices. During a Corpus Christi procession, she reportedly stood at her window with her servant, spinning wool—a deliberate act of dissent against the Eucharist's veneration. She allegedly mocked the priests singing prayers and ridiculed the women in the procession. On another occasion, Bonna clashed with one of the witnesses, reportedly declaring her allegiance to the “Lutheran” cause and admitting her involvement in bringing Protestant preachers to the city.

Bonna died around 1537 in Geneva.

== Legacy ==
Bonna is depicted on a bas-relief of the International Monument to the Reformation.
