= Bonnie Averbach =

American actuary, mathematician, and author (1933–2019)

Bonnie Averbach (née Rudolph; 1933 – October 16, 2019) was an American mathematics and actuarial science educator who worked for many years on the faculty of Temple University and was known for her books in mathematics.

== Life and career ==
Averbach was born in 1933, and earned a master's degree in mathematics from Temple University in 1955, with the thesis "Definitions of the Lebesgue integral". Around 1965, she returned to Temple University as a faculty member. Originally affiliated with the Department of Mathematics, she changed her affiliation in 1987, to the Department of Risk Management and Insurance, where for many years she directed Temple's actuarial science program. In 2007, Temple's Fox School of Business and Management gave her their lifetime achievement award. She died on October 16, 2019.

== Books ==
Averbach's books include:

- Problem Solving Through Recreational Mathematics (with Orin Chein, W. H. Freeman, 1980; reprinted by Dover, 2000)
- Mathematics with Applications for the Management, Life, and Social Sciences (with Bernard Kolman and Howard Anton, 3rd ed., Harcourt Brace Jovanovich, 1988; 4th ed., Saunders College Publishing, 1992)
- Applied Finite Mathematics (with Bernard Kolman and Howard Anton, 5th ed., Saunders College Publishing, 1992)
