= Bonnie Koppell =

American rabbi

Rabbi Koppell
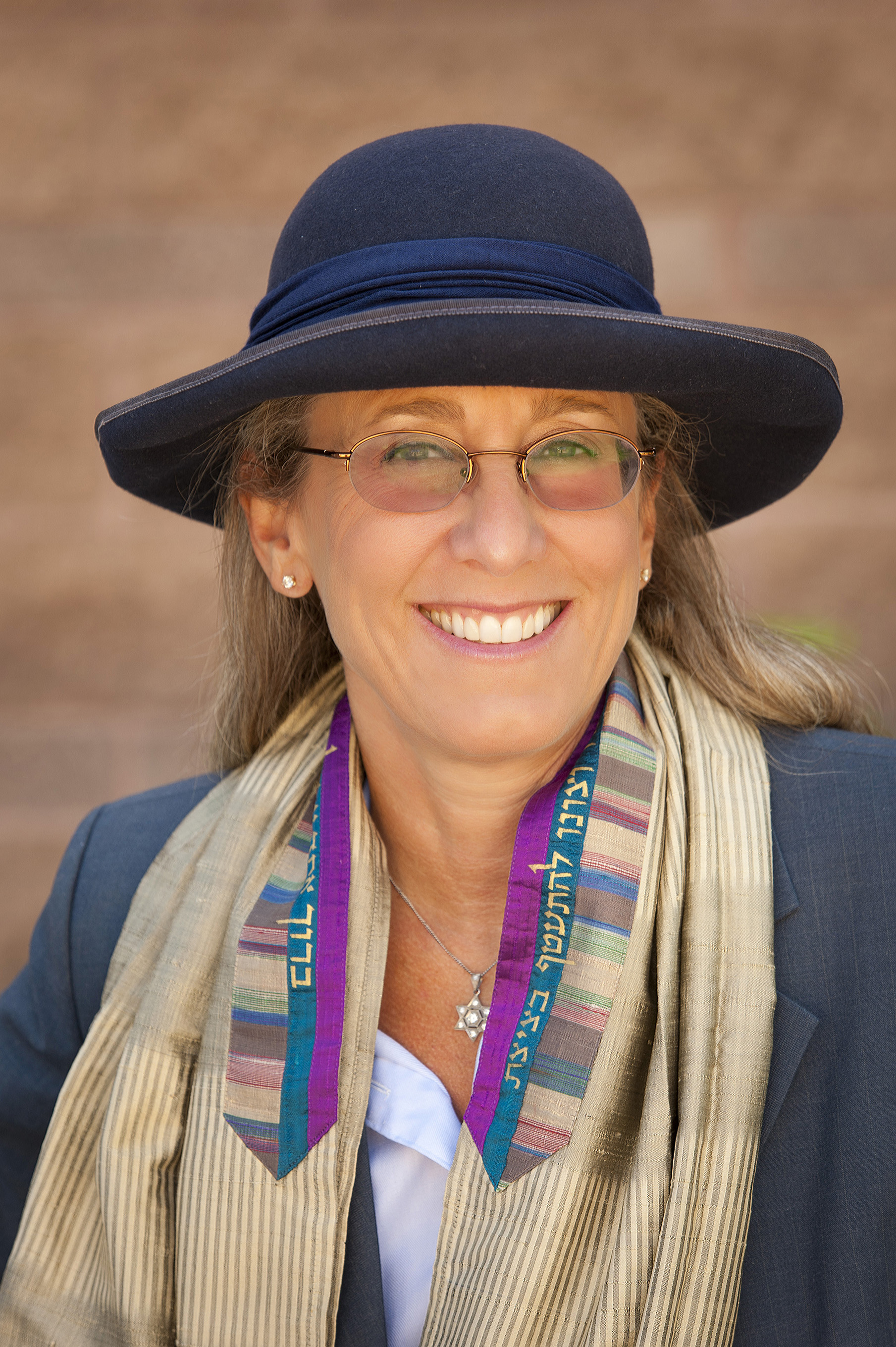
- Bonnie Koppell
- Title: Rabbi

Personal life
- Born: Brooklyn, New York

Religious life
- Religion: Judaism

Jewish leader
- Synagogue: Temple Chai
- Residence: Phoenix, Arizona

Bonnie Koppell is an American rabbi. She was one of the first female rabbis in the United States, and was the first woman rabbi to serve in the U.S. military. Since 2006, Rabbi Koppell has served as a rabbi to the Temple Chai community, located in Phoenix, Arizona.

== Early life ==
A native of Brooklyn, New York, Rabbi Koppell graduated Reconstructionist Rabbinical College in 1981, and was awarded an honorary Doctor of Divinity degree in 2006 for 25 years of service in the rabbinate. She holds a master's degree in religion from Temple University. She earned her Bachelor of Arts from Brandeis University and graduated magna cum laude in Near Eastern and Judaic studies, with high honors in philosophy.

== Career ==
=== Rabbinic ===
Rabbi Koppell has steadily held rabbinic positions since 1980. In addition, she also has served as President of the Board of Directors of the East Valley Child Crisis Center, and as President of the Board of Rabbis of Greater Phoenix. She contributed the City of Mesa’s ethics code, and has served on the Board of the Jewish Family and Children’s Services, as well as the Board of the Jewish Community Relations Council.

=== Military ===
Rabbi Koppell served as a chaplain (colonel) in the United States Army Reserve, and was the first female Rabbi to serve in the U.S. military. CH Koppell was commissioned as a 2LT Chaplain Candidate in 1978; she joined the army reserves in 1978 while a rabbinical student at the Reconstructionist Rabbinical College in Philadelphia, Pennsylvania. She served a year of active duty in support of Operation Noble Eagle. She spent Passover 2006 in Iraq, Chanukkah 2005/2006 with Jewish service members in Kuwait and Afghanistan, and was deployed to Iraq for Passover 2006. She returned to Afghanistan in 2008, and celebrated Passover in Kuwait in 2010. She was formerly the Command Chaplain for the 807th Medical Command (Deployment Support) based in Salt Lake City, Utah, and was previously assigned as the Command Chaplain of the 63D Regional Support Command. She retired from military service in 2016. In January 2013, she attended the prestigious Senior Leader Seminar sponsored by the U.S. Army War College's Strategic Studies Institute, and in July 2013 received a Master's degree from the school in Strategic studies.

== Honors and awards ==
Rabbi Koppell was recognized as “Outstanding Young Leader of the Year” for the City of Mesa in 1994. She was the recipient of the “Spirit of Unity” award from the City of Mesa's Martin Luther King Jr. Celebration, and received the “Celebration of Success” award from Impact for Enterprising Women. The Arizona Cactus Pine Girl Scout Council awarded Rabbi Koppell its “World of People” award. She served as grand marshal for the City of Mesa Veteran’s Day Parade in 1999, and was Mesa’s “Woman of the Year” in 2004. In 2007, she was invited to the White House to offer the opening prayer at a meeting of Jewish leaders with the current President of the United States, George W. Bush. In 2010, she was named as one of The Jewish Daily Forward's “Sisterhood 50 – America’s Influential Women Rabbis.” CH Koppell has received many military awards, including three Meritorious Service medals, two Army Achievement Medals, Physical Fitness Excellence awards, and an Army Commendation Medal. In 2012 she was awarded the Legion of Merit by the 63D Regional Support Command. In 2019 she was inducted into the U.S. Army Women’s Foundation Hall of Fame.
