= Bonnie Broel =

American fashion designer

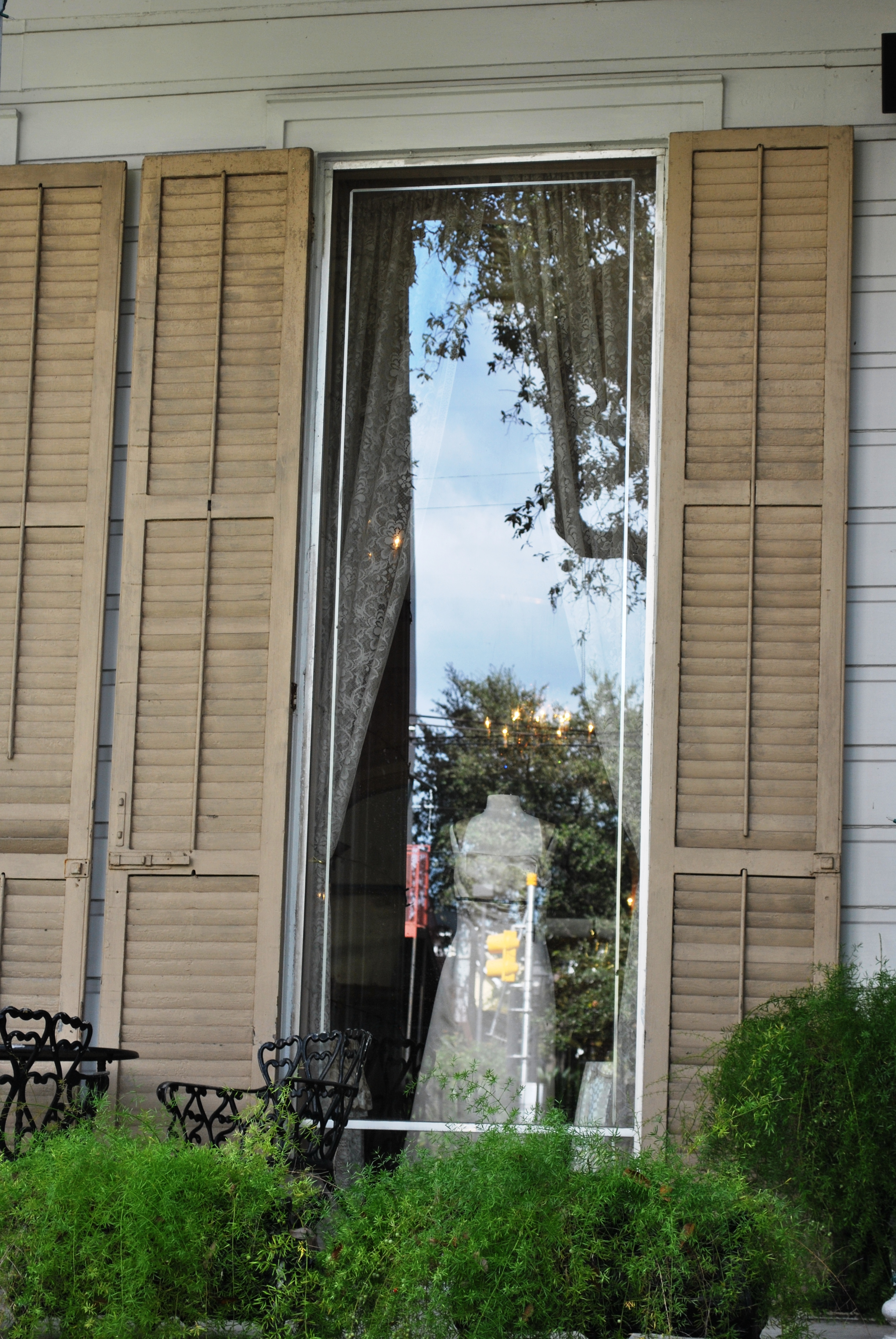
The House of Broel began operations at Squires House in New Orleans Garden District in 1970.

Bonnie Broel is the owner of House of Broel, a retail outlet specializing in bridal and evening wear.

== Overview ==
Bonnie Broel is president of the House of Broel Foundation, a 501(c)(3) corporation. She is also the former president of the Bridal Marketing Association of America and the St. Charles Ave. Business Association.

== Awards ==
In 1991, Bonnie was awarded the first international "ROSE" award (Retailer of Style and Excellence Award) at the Dallas Apparel Market. In 1992 she received the Lifetime Achievement Award from Fashion Group International for her contributions to the fashion industry and won an Alpha Award for the best in-store designer.

On October 16, 2011, Broel was honoured as a Louisiana Legend by Sheriff Marlin N. Gusman.
