= Bonita Sharma =

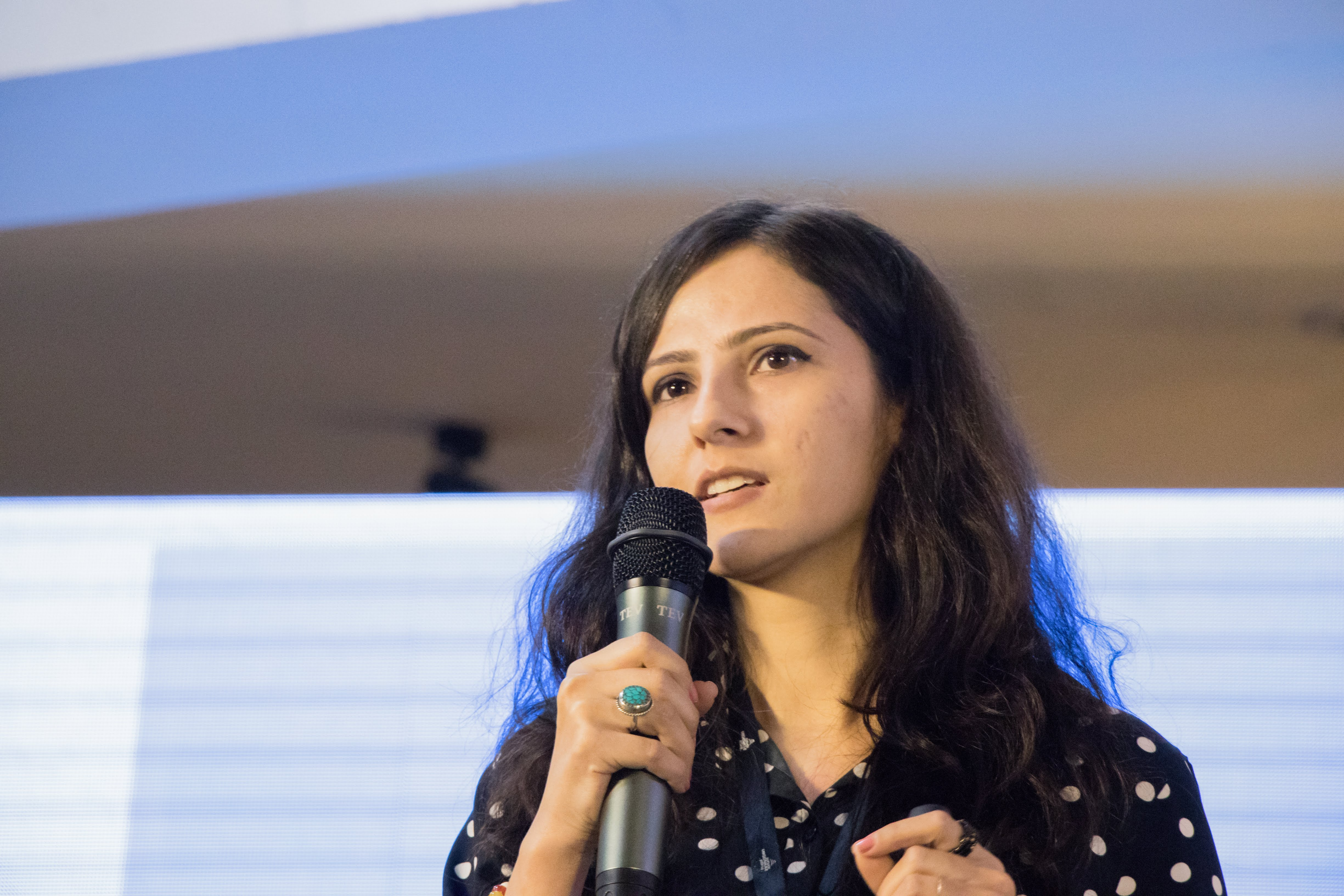
Bonita Sharma at an event in 2019

Bonita Sharma (English: बोनिता शर्मा) is a Nepali health and nutrition activist. She runs Social Changemakers and Innovators (SOCHAI) and in 2019 was listed as one of the BBC's 100 Women.

== Early life ==
Sharma was born in Nepal. She studied for a BA in Public Health at Purbanchal University and took a master's degree in Nutrition from Tribhuvan University.

== Career ==
Bonita Sharma founded Social Changemakers and Innovators (SOCHAI) in 2017. It is a non-profit organization which aims to eradicate malnutrition and to encourage good health, particularly for women and children. In order to reduce child deaths from malnutrition, she introduced a bracelet called Nutribeads (Poshan Maala) which helps mothers to plan meals for their children. In 2016, Nutribeads won the Asia Pacific Youth Innovation Challenge. With the profits raised from selling the bracelets, SOCHAI was able to provide aid to mothers and children affected by disaster in the Morang district of eastern Nepal.

SOCHAI is also producing Red Cycle bracelets with 28 beads so that women can plan their menstrual cycle using different colours. Sharma writes on issues affecting women such as nutrition, abortion and COVID-19. Sharma's name was announced on the BBC's 100 Women list in 2019 and she is a UNESCO Female Champion as part of the Malala Fund for Girls’ Right to Education. She also won the Zero Hunger category award of the Lead 2030 Challenge presented by One Young World, which gave her $50,000. Bonita is also awarded the Goalkeeper Global Goals Progress Award 2020 by the Bill & Melinda Gates Foundation.
