= Bonnie Izzard =

Australian rules footballer, born 1908

Personal information
- Full name: Albert Ernest Izzard
- Born: 15 July 1908; Richmond, Victoria
- Died: 11 February 1990 (aged 81)
- Original team: Hyde St Methodists

Playing career^{1}
Years	Club	Games (Goals)
1929	Footscray	3 (3)
- ^{1} Playing statistics correct to the end of 1929.

Bonnie Izzard (15 July 1908 – 11 February 1990) was an Australian rules footballer who played with Footscray in the Victorian Football League (VFL).
