= Bonnie Sloane =

Pharmacology professor

Bonnie F. Sloane
- Education: Rutgers University
- Scientific career
- Thesis: Alterations in lysosomal enzyme activity in rat uterine muscle as affected by the hormonal state of the muscle (1976)

Bonnie Fiedorek Sloane was a distinguished professor at Wayne State University known for her research on cancer. In 2021 she was elected a fellow of the American Association for the Advancement of Science.

== Education and Career ==
Sloane was born in 1944 in Pittsburgh, Pennsylvania. Sloane has a B.S. (1966) and an M.A. (1968) from Duke University (1966). She earned her Ph.D. from Rutgers University in 1976. Following her Ph.D. she did postdoctoral work at the University of Pennsylvania, and in 1979 was an assistant professor at the University of Pennsylvania. She then moved to Michigan State University where she was an assistant professor from 1979 until 1980 when she moved to Wayne State University as an assistant professor in the Department of Pharmacology. She was promoted to associate professor in 1984 and to professor in 1989, and in 2005 she was named distinguished professor. From 1995 until 2015, she served as chair of the Department of Pharmacology, the first woman to serve as chair of a department in the Wayne State University School of Medicine.

From 2009 until 2011, Sloane was president of the Association of Medical Pharmacology, the first woman to serve in this role.

== Research ==
Sloane is known for her research on cancer, especially breast cancer. Her research has examined cathepsins and proteases associated with cancer. She has also used imaging with fluorescent probes to track the activity of proteases.

== Selected publications ==
- Mohamed, Mona Mostafa; Sloane, Bonnie F. (2006). "Cysteine cathepsins: multifunctional enzymes in cancer". Nature Reviews Cancer. 6 (10): 764–775. doi:10.1038/nrc1949. ISSN 1474-175X. PMID 16990854. S2CID 26463930.
- Koblinski, Jennifer E; Ahram, Mamoun; Sloane, Bonnie F (2000-02-15). "Unraveling the role of proteases in cancer". Clinica Chimica Acta. 291 (2): 113–135. doi:10.1016/S0009-8981(99)00224-7. ISSN 0009-8981. PMID 10675719.</ref>
- Sloane, Bonnie F.; Dunn, John R.; Honn, Kenneth V. (1981-06-05). "Lysosomal Cathepsin B: Correlation with Metastatic Potential". Science. 212 (4499): 1151–1153. Bibcode:1981Sci...212.1151S. doi:10.1126/science.7233209. ISSN 0036-8075. PMID 7233209. S2CID 33974450.

== Awards and honors ==
In 1996, Sloane was elected to the Wayne State University Academy of Scholars. In 2021 Sloane was named a fellow of the American Association for the Advancement of Science.
