= Bonnie A. Charpentier =

American chemist

- Education: University of Houston, BA (1974); University of Houston, PhD (1981)
- Awards: Elected American Chemical Society Fellow
- Scientific career
- Fields: Cytokinetics

Bonnie A. Charpentier is an American chemist. In 2019, she served as the president of the American Chemical Society (ACS) and is a past chair of its board of directors. She is also the Senior Vice President of Regulatory Affairs and Compliance at Cytokinetics.

== Education ==
Bonnie Charpentier completed a bachelor's degree in anthropology in 1974 and a Ph.D. in plant physiology in 1981, both at the University of Houston. Her early interest in herbal folk medicines first drew her into anthropology and plant science, then into analytical chemistry and her career overseeing regulatory affairs, quality, and drug safety at pharmaceutical companies.

== Career ==
Bonnie Charpentier joined the biopharmaceutical firm Cytokinetics as their Senior Vice President of Regulatory Affairs and Compliance in 2014. Before that, she was Vice President of Regulatory Affairs and Quality at Metabolex (now CymaBay Therapeutics). She also previously held various roles at Genitope Corp, Roche Global Development (a division of Hoffmann-La Roche), Syntex Corporation, and Procter & Gamble where she started her career as an analytical chemist.

From 2019 to 2020, Charpentier served as the president of the American Chemical Society (ACS). Her priorities as ACS president included strengthening collaborations with academia, industry, and professional societies; growing science advocacy programs; and improving scientific literacy.

== Awards ==
- 2015, ACS Fellow
- 2014, Sherrie Wilkins Award from the Northern California Chapters of the Association for Women in Science (AWIS)
- 2013, Shirley B. Radding award
