= Bonnie Shemie =

Author and illustrator of educational children's books

Bonnie Shemie (born May 10, 1949) is an author and illustrator who has written educational books for children including a series about Native American dwellings. She was born in the U.S. and lives in Canada.

Her writing focuses on different cultures' pre-modern construction techniques, as well as their belief systems.

== Life and career ==
Shemie (née Brenner) was born on May 10, 1949, in Cleveland, Ohio to parents William and Louise Brenner. She studied architecture in the United States before moving to Montreal, Canada, in 1972. In 1974, she married Milo Shemie. From 1973 to 1976, she worked as a graphic designer and illustrator for advertising agencies in Montreal. She went on to pursue a career as a freelance illustrator, and later as an author and illustrator of children's books.

Shemie's Native Dwellings series started with the book, Houses of Snow, Skin and Bones: Native Dwellings, the Far North, published in 1989. The book was aimed at children and contained detailed descriptions of the homes built by Inuit tribes in Alaska. The work was praised and Noel McDermott in Canadian Children's Literature called it "a well-written and beautifully illustrated book, in which carefully researched information is presented, clearly and accurately and without any tendency to eulogize or romanticize."

Shemie's book Houses of China was described as "excellent". Her book Houses of Hide and Earth was described as accessible and appealing while Shemie's research for her books was lauded.

== Selected works ==
=== Native Dwellings series ===
- Houses of Snow, Skin and Bones (1989) - ISBN 0-88776-240-9
- Houses of Bark: Tipi, Wigwam and Longhouse (1990) - ISBN 0887762468
- Houses of Wood (1992) - ISBN 0-88776-284-0
- Houses of Hide and Earth
- Mounds of Earth and Shell

=== Others ===
- Houses of China (1996) - ISBN 0-88776-369-3
- Building Canada (2001) - ISBN 0-88776-504-1
- Building America by Janice Weaver (2002) - ISBN 0-88776-606-4 (Illustrator)
