= Bonnie Brinton =

American academic

Bonnie Brinton is a speech language pathologist, a professor at Brigham Young University (BYU), and from 1999 to 2009 was dean of the BYU graduate school.

Prior to joining the BYU faculty, Brinton was on the faculty of the University of Kansas and the University of Nevada School of Medicine.

Brinton holds a BA and a PhD from the University of Utah and a master's degree from San Jose State University. Much of her research has been published jointly with her husband Martin Fujiki. Much of their work has been published in either the Journal of Speech and Hearing Disorders or the Journal of Speech and Hearing Research. Brinton and Fujiki met while both were Ph.D. students at the University of Utah in speech language pathology. Since their marriage, every major paper they have published has been a joint project. They also managed to jointly move from the University of Nevada to the University of Kansas to BYU. Brinton and Fujiki have also written two books, Coping with Communicative Handicaps: Resources for Practicing Clinicians (along with S. McFarlane) and Conversational Management with Language-Impaired Children: Pragmatic Assessment and Intervention (Rockville, Maryland: Aspen Publishers, 1989).

Brinton and Fujiki are both members of the Church of Jesus Christ of Latter-day Saints. They are the parents of two children.

== Publications ==
- "Description of a Program for Social Language Intervention: If You Can Have a Conversation, You Can Have a Relationship" in Language, Speech and Hearing Services in Schools Vol. 35 (July 2004) p. 283-290. with Fujiki and Lee Robinson.
- "Social Skills of Children with Specific Language Impairment" in Language Speech Hearing Services in Schools Vol. 27, Issue 3 (1996) p. 195-202. with Fujiki and C. M. Todd.
- "Ways to Teach Conversation" chapter co-authored with Fujiki in Judith Felson Duchan, Lynne E. Hewitt and Rae M. Sonnenmeier, ed., Pragmatics: From Theory to Practice (Englewood Cliffs, New Jersey: Prentice Hall, 1994).
- "Life on a Tricycle". Topics in Language Disorders. 25 (4): 338–352. Brinton, Bonnie; Fujiki, Martin; Robinson, Lee A. (2005).

== Sources ==
- BYU Studies Vol. 49, no. 2, p. 29.
- BYU Faculty Page on Bonnie Brinton
- BYU Faculty Page on Martin Fujiki
- BYU Magazine Fall 1999
- labome.org entry for Brinton
