= Yasnyiar Bonne Gea =

Indonesian surfer (born 1982)

Personal information
- Born: 16 June 1982 (age 44) Lagundri, South Nias, Indonesia

Surfing career
- Sport: Surfing

Yasnyiar Bonne Gea (born 16 June 1982) is an Indonesian surfer. She has been crowned Indonesian woman champion 5 times. She is exclusively sponsored by Billabong Asia and rides Dylan surfboard.

== Career ==
National:

- Indonesian Women Champion 2008, 2009, 2010, 2011, 2012

International:

- Asian Champion 2011, 2014
- Asian Beach Games 2nd 2008
