= Bonnie Lubega =

- Born: Bonnie Lubega; 1929 (age 96–97); Uganda
- Occupation: writer
- Writing career
- Genre: Novels
- Notable works: The outcast, The burning bush

Bonnie Lubega (born 1929) is an Ugandan novelist, fiction writer and lexicographer. He is the author of the novels The Burning Bush (1970) and The Outcasts (1971).

== Early life and education ==
Lubega was born in Buganda, Uganda, in 1929, where he received his early education and qualified as a teacher. In the mid-1950s, he worked for a number of newspapers in Kampala, and published his own pictorial magazine, Sanyu. He later studied journalism in Germany and worked as a script writer and radio presenter.

== Writing ==
His first book, The Burning Bush (1970), depicts a herdsboy, Nakamwa-Ntette, whose narrative voice reveals the acuity of close observation. The major conflict in the novel is between Nakamwa-Ntette and the educated son of the village head and landlord. In The Outcasts (1971), Lubega presents the marginalised migrant Balaalo, despised by the dominant Baganda, for whom they herd cattle. But the hero, Karekyesi, penetrates his exploiters’ psychology and outwits them. The Great Animal Land (1971) and Cry, Jungle Children (1974), although strongly didactic, assert Lubega's humanism as he familiarises a youthful audience with Africa's threatened ecosystems. His Luganda semantic dictionary, Olulimi Oluganda Amakula (1995), an original work, reflects an abiding cultural concern. He is also the co-author of The Terrible Graakwa (Luganda version by Janine Corneilse, 1998), and One Dark Dark Night (Luganda version by Lesley Beake, 1998).

== Published works ==
=== Novels ===
- Pot of Honey. East African Literature Bureau. 1974. ISBN 9780860702313.
- The Outcasts. Heinemann Educational Books. 1971. ISBN 9780435901059.
- The Burning Bush. Uganda Literature Bureau. 1970. ISBN 9780860700067.

=== Children's literature ===
- Great Animal Land. East African Literature Bureau. 1977. ISBN 9780860701163.
- Cry Jungle Children. East African Literature Bureau. 1974. ISBN 9780860702306.

=== other books ===
- Four Language Easy Communication Pocket Book: Luganda English Kiswahili. Pana African books:kampala. 1997.

=== Essays ===
- "Goa: An African writer's perspective", 1964
