= Bonnie Judd =

Canadian animal trainer

Bonnie Judd is a Canadian animal trainer known for training dogs to act in films and commercials. She founded and runs the company Canine Co-Stars, based in Aldergrove, British Columbia, Canada, in the Fraser Valley area. Through this company, she has trained dogs and a variety of other animals, including monkeys and turtles, to successfully act in films. She has trained dogs to act in films including Air Bud: World Pup (2000), Good Boy! (2003), and A Dog's Journey (2019), for which she served as animal coordinator. She has also trained a variety of animals, including dogs, pixie toads, and sheep, to act in commercials.
