= Bonnie Low-Kramen =

American author and public speaker (b. 1957)

- Born: Bonnie Joyce Low; July 14, 1957 (age 69); Kearny, New Jersey U.S.A.
- Education: Rutgers University (BA)
- Known for: Author, speaker, corporate consultant
- Partner: Robert Sanders
- Website: https://www.bonnielowkramen.com/

Bonnie Low-Kramen (born July 14, 1957 in Kearny NJ, USA) is an American author, workplace expert, public speaker, and president and CEO of Ultimate Assistant Training & Consulting Inc. She holds a B.A. degree in English and Theater from Rutgers University in New Brunswick, New Jersey.

== Career ==
=== CEO and co-founder ===
For 25 years, Low-Kramen worked as the personal assistant to Oscar-winner Olympia Dukakis and actor Louis Zorich.

In 1996 she co-founded New York Celebrity Assistants (NYCA) a professional networking association for celebrity assistants, alongside assistants to Morgan Freeman and Marlo Thomas. She was President of the NYCA for two years, from 1997 to 1999.

In 2004, she founded Ultimate Assistant Training & Consulting Inc, and In 2011 she launched the 'Be the Ultimate Assistant' (BTUA) workshop, one of the first interactive courses to train executive and personal assistants. BTUA training has been taught in the United States, London, Paris, and Brussels.

=== Writing ===
Low-Kramen's book Be the Ultimate Assistant: A celebrity assistant's secrets to working with any high-powered employer is an Amazon bestseller and included a foreword by Olympia Dukakis. It was self-published in 2004. As of 2012, it is in its fifth edition. Her next book, Staff Matters: People-Focused Solutions for the Ultimate New Workplace, based on a series of interviews with leaders, HR professionals, recruiters, and business school professors, will be released on 28 February 2023.

Low-Kramen has written about workplace issues and personal assisting for publications including Harvard Business Review and is a regular contributor and board member of Executive Support Magazine. Regarded as a leading expert in workplace issues and personal assisting, she has been interviewed for Los Angeles Times, Forbes, The New York Times and The Washington Post.

=== Public speaking ===
In February, 2022, Low-Kramen gave a TEDx Talk called 'The Real Reasons People Quit'. Low-Kramen regularly works as a public speaker at private events and businesses, including Starbucks, the British Parliament, the Wharton School, MD Anderson Cancer Centre, and Rutgers University.

=== Podcasting and YouTube ===
Since 2011, Low-Kramen has co-hosted the 'Be the Ultimate Assistant' podcast series with Vickie Sokol Evans. The podcast interviews experts to discuss timely workplace issues. In 2021, the COVID-19 pandemic inspired a weekly live-streamed show on Facebook 'Heads Together' that Low-Kramen co-hosted with her assistant Jennifer Wilner. The show ended in 2022.
