= Bonnie Korte =

American judoka

Personal information
- Occupation: Judoka

Sport
- Sport: Judo
- Rank: 9th dan black belt

Profile at external databases
- JudoInside.com: 20416

Bonnie Korte is a female former competitor in Judo. She has been described as an early champion. Originally from Missouri, Bonnie was famous for her throw Osoto Gari. Bonnie held multiple judo national titles, prior to the advent of the world judo championships. She earned two gold medals in the Women's National Championships. The 1975 championship saw her placing over Amy Kublin and Christine Penick. She currently sits on the board of directors for the United States Judo Association.
