= School of Education (Indiana University Bloomington) =

Public college in Bloomington, Indiana, U.S.

Coordinates: 39.167135°N 86.512441°W

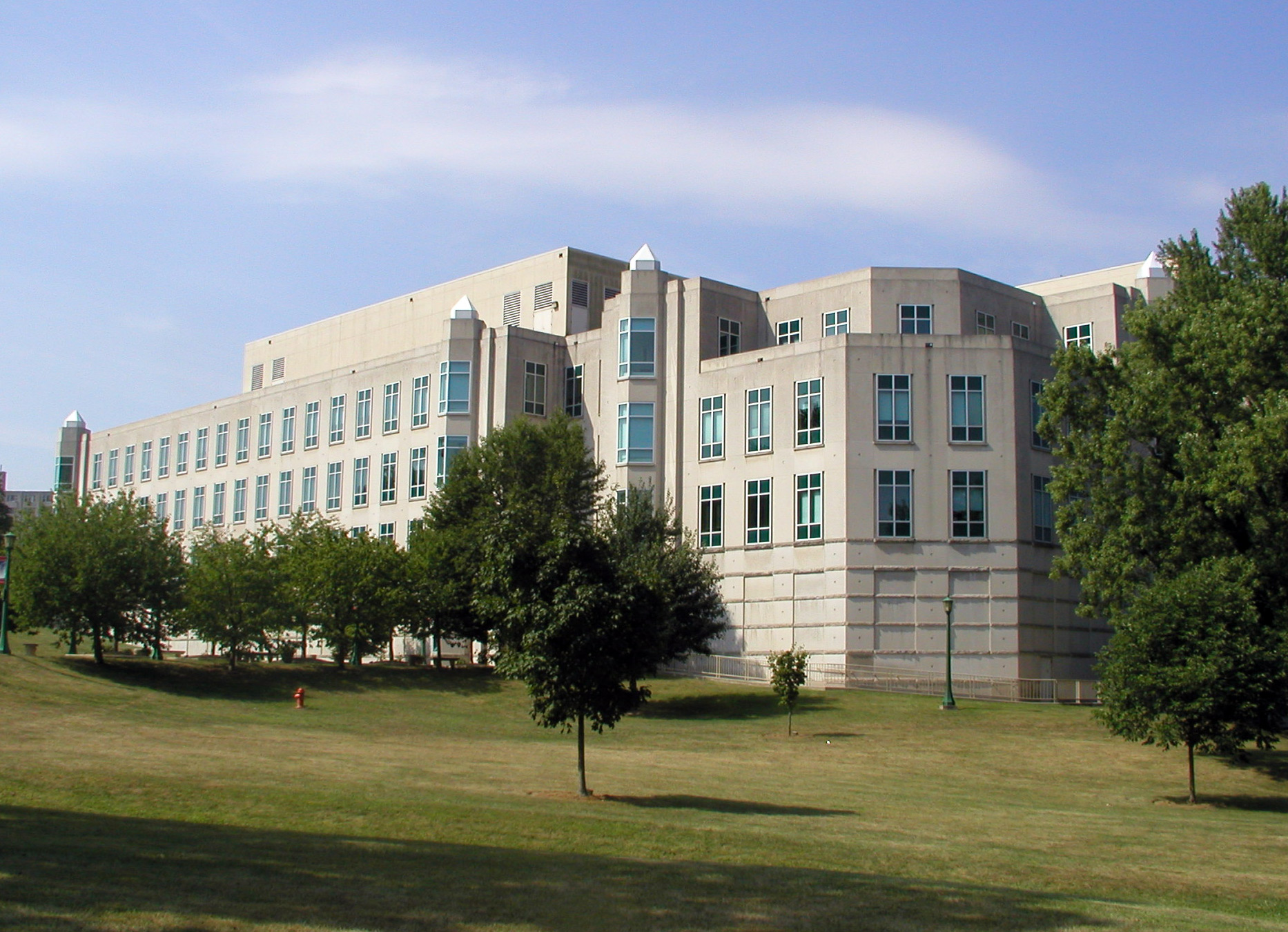
- Wendell W. Wright Education Building
- Type: Public
- Established: 1923; 103 years ago
- Location: Bloomington, Indiana, U.S.
- Website: education.indiana.edu

The School of Education is the school of education of Indiana University Bloomington in Bloomington, Indiana, United States. It offers a B.S. in teacher education, leading to a teaching license, M.S., education specialist (Ed.S.) and doctoral (Ed.D., Ph.D.) degrees.

== Academics ==
There are 4 departments in the IU School of Education:

1. Counseling and Educational Psychology
2. Curriculum and Instruction
3. Educational Leadership and Policy Studies
4. Instructional Systems Technology

== Research centers ==
There are 3 research centers at the IU School of Education:

1. Center for Evaluation and Education Policy (CEEP)
2. Center for Postsecondary Research (CPR)
3. Center for Research on Learning and Technology (CRLT)

Since 2014, the Center for Postsecondary Research has been responsible for the maintenance and production of the Carnegie Classification of Institutions of Higher Education, the largest and most prominent framework for classifying colleges and universities in the United States. Created in 1970, it is named after and was originally created by the Carnegie Foundation for the Advancement of Teaching.

== Accreditations and rankings ==
Former US Secretary of Education Rod Paige was a student at IU's School of Education. It has been accredited by the National Council for Accreditation of Teacher Education (NCATE) since the foundation of NCATE in 1954. The School of Education houses master's degree programs in Mental Health Counseling and School Counseling, both of which are accredited by the Masters in Psychology and Counseling Accreditation Council (MPCAC).
