= Bonnie L. Green =

American academic

- Awards: Award for Outstanding Contributions to the Science of Trauma Psychology, 2012

Bonnie L. Green is a psychiatrist known for her research of trauma-related mental health needs of female primary care patients from lower-income households. She served as editor-in-chief of the Journal of Traumatic Stress from 1993 until 1997. She was president of the International Society for Traumatic Stress Studies from 2000 to 2001.

Green received the 2012 Award for Outstanding Contributions to the Science of Trauma Psychology from the American Psychological Association, Division 56 (Trauma Psychology).

== Biography ==
From 1970 to 1990, Green taught at the University of Cincinnati Medical Center as a professor of Psychiatry. Following that, from 1987 to 2006, she was a professor at the University of Cincinnati. Until 2015, Green was a professor and vice chair for research in the Department of Psychiatry and founding associate dean for Faculty Development for Georgetown University Medical School.

Following that, she was the director of the Georgetown Center for Trauma and the Community; within her time in this position, she aided in the development of intervention methods of trauma related needs within lower-income communities.

She holds the position of Professor Emeritus at Georgetown University Medical School.

== Research ==
Green's research has addressed trauma-related issues in multiple situations. In the years following the Buffalo Creek flood, Green examined the mental health of people in the twenty years following the flood. Following the Oklahoma City bombing, Green talked about the impact of the event on the mental health of survivors. She also provided training for medical professionals to enable them to work successfully with trauma patients. Green is also known for her work identifying symptoms of psychiatric issues within people with early-stage breast cancer, and for her work examining the effectiveness of intervention for low-income and minority women with depression. The results of the study note that medication and psychotherapy interventions caused a reduction in symptoms of depression.

== Selected publications ==
- Green, B. L., Goodman, L. A., Krupnick, J. L., Corcoran, C. B., Petty, R. M., Stockton, P., & Stern, N. M. (2000). Outcomes of single versus multiple trauma exposure in a screening sample. Journal of Traumatic Stress, 13, 271-286.
- Green, B. L., Grace, M. C., Vary, M. G., Kramer, T. L., Gleser, G. C., & Leonard, A. C. (1994). Children of disaster in the second decade: A 17-year follow-up of Buffalo Creek survivors. Journal of the American Academy of Child & Adolescent Psychiatry, 33(1), 71-79.
- Green, B. L., Korol, M., Grace, M. C., Vary, M. G., Leonard, A. C., Gleser, G. C., & Smitson-Cohen, S. (1991). Children and disaster: Age, gender, and parental effects on PTSD symptoms. Journal of the American Academy of Child & Adolescent Psychiatry, 30(6), 945-951.
- Green, B. L., Lindy, J. D., Grace, M. C., & Leonard, A. C. (1992). Chronic posttraumatic stress disorder and diagnostic comorbidity in a disaster sample. The Journal of Nervous and Mental Disease, 180(12), 760-766.
- Green, B. L., Rowland, J. H., Krupnick, J. L., Epstein, S. A., Stockton, P., Stern, N. M., ... & Steakley, C. (1998). Prevalence of posttraumatic stress disorder in women with breast cancer. Psychosomatics, 39(2), 102-111.
