= Bonita Jacobs =

Former president of University of North Georgia

Bonita Jacobs is a former president of the University of North Georgia (UNG). She took office as the 17th president of North Georgia College & State University in July 2011. She was the university's first female president and only the second woman to lead one of the country's six Senior Military Colleges. Jacobs retired from UNG in June 2023.

== Career ==
Jacobs received bachelor's degrees in Spanish and history and a master's degree in counseling from Stephen F. Austin State University. She earned her doctorate in educational administration from Texas A&M University.

Prior to coming to the University of North Georgia, Jacobs served as executive director of the National Institute for the Study of Transfer Students (2009-2011), vice president for student development (1998-2009), and as professor in counseling and higher education at the University of North Texas. She currently serves on the College Board's Community College Advisory Panel.

Earlier, she served as assistant vice chancellor, and later interim vice chancellor for student development and dean of students at Western Carolina University and in positions at Stephen F. Austin State University.

She started serving July 1, 2011, and retired July 1, 2023, making 12 years of service to the University. In 2022, Jacobs announced her plans to retire as president of the University of North Georgia.

== Accomplishments ==
While president, she directed the consolidation of North Georgia College and State University and Gainesville State College, when the two combined in 2013 to form the University of North Georgia. She increased alumni giving and scholarship funding by 500%. She founded the National Institute for the Study of Transfer students. She is the author of:

- UNG The Gold I See!: The Legacy of UNG's Dahlonega Campus
- The College Transfer Student in America: The Forgotten Student
- Best Day Ever!
- Strategic Mergers in Higher Education

== Awards ==
In 2014, Dr. Jacobs was named as one of the "100 Most Influential Georgians" by Georgia Trend magazine. In 2013 and 2014 she was named as one of the "Top Education Leaders in Atlanta" by the Atlanta Business Chronicle.
