= Bonnie Buchanan =

Academic and author

- Education: University of Georgia (PhD in finance); Royal Melbourne Institute of Technology (Mappsc in statistics and mathematics); University of New South Wales (BS in statistics and mathematics)
- Occupation: Professor
- Organization: University of Surrey
- Known for: Contributions to the fintech sector

Bonnie Buchanan is a professor at the University of Surrey and director of the UK-based Sustainable and Explainable FinTech (SAEF) Center. She served as the Editor-in-Chief of Journal of Risk Finance between 2013 and 2021. Previously, she was the Fulbright Finland Distinguished Chair in Business and Economics at Hanken School of Economics.

== Contributions to the Fintech Sector ==
in June 2019, Buchanan testified to the US Congress as a witness at the House of Financial Services' Task Force providing expert views on the use of artificial intelligence in financial services. As a director of the SAEF, her role is to enhance fintech literacy in the United Kingdom to "help the UK address global challenges such as wealth inequality, biodiversity, trust in institutions and regulation." Her work has been quoted by CNBC.

== See also ==
Bonnie Buchanan on Google Scholar
