= Gino Bona =

American marketing professional

Gino Bona (born April 14, 1973) is an American marketing professional. In January 2007, he won the National Football League's "Pitch Us Your Idea For the Best Super Bowl Commercial Ever" contest. His concept was turned into a commercial that aired on February 4, 2007 during the Super Bowl XLI telecast on CBS.

== Background ==
Bona was born and raised in Buffalo, New York. In 1995, he graduated from Ithaca College with a degree in Television/Radio.

From 1995 to 2001, Bona held various copywriting jobs for advertising agencies and businesses throughout Washington DC. Bona moved to Massachusetts in late 2001 and started writing a weekly sports column on his Web site, "Wink & The Gun." In December 2002, Bona joined ESPN.com's Page 2 as a freelance columnist. In addition to writing columns for ESPN.com, Bona teamed up with Eric Kielb to write and record song parodies for Page 2 under the alias "Bristol Bob & The Page 2 Crue." After contributing dozens of columns and songs, Bona parted ways with ESPN.com in early 2006.

After leaving ESPN.com, Bona joined an advertising agency in Portland, Maine as director of business development. Bona briefly attended Syracuse University's Whitman School of Management in January 2007 to attain his MBA, but dropped out during his second day of studies upon being notified that he won the Super Bowl commercial contest.

== "Pitch Us Your Idea for the Best Super Bowl Commercial Ever" Contest ==
The National Football League pioneered the consumer-generated trend to advertising's biggest stage. General Motors and Frito-Lay also held contests for people to have their concepts aired during the Super Bowl XLI telecast.

The National Football League held auditions in New Jersey, Dallas and Denver in November and December 2006. A total of 1,700 football fans auditioned their concepts in these cities. Bona auditioned at Giants Stadium in East Rutherford, New Jersey in November 2006. Bona's pitch centered about fans mourning the end of yet another football season. Over a 90-second period, Bona acted out several scenes of sad football fans. He also sang a brief portion of "It's So Hard to Say Goodbye To Yesterday" by Boyz II Men to set the mood for his concept.

On December 18, 2006, the NFL publicly announced its 12 finalists. That same day, Bona's wife, Stephanie Parry, gave birth to their son, Quentin Thomas Bona, in Portsmouth, New Hampshire. Bona claimed his son's initials were merely a "football-related coincidence."

The winner of the contest was determined by a combination of online voting, a group of top league executives and a panel made up of Lisa Baird, senior vice president for the NFL, actor Don Cheadle, and commercial director Joe Pytka. Baird claimed that the league wanted fans to be engaged throughout the entire process.

On January 8, 2007, the National Football League announced that Bona won the contest. He received two tickets to Super Bowl XLI, a trip to the game in Miami, a trip to Los Angeles to attend the commercial shoot, and national media attention, including a feature story on "CBS Evening News with Katie Couric" on February 1, 2007.

== The Super Bowl Commercial ==
Bona worked with representatives from the NFL and acclaimed director Joe Pytka to create the Super Bowl commercial. Pytka has directed several Super Bowl ads, including the classic McDonald's commercial titled "Nothing But Net," featuring Michael Jordan and Larry Bird.

The commercial was filmed in Los Angeles and Mississippi in January 2007. While many of the scenes from Bona's original pitch in New Jersey remained in the finished commercial, there were some noticeable changes. Bona pitched his concept to the song "It's So Hard to Say Goodbye To Yesterday." The commercial featured "Saint James Infirmary" by Louis Armstrong. The commercial aired during the two-minute warning of the fourth quarter.

The end of Bona's commercial was also different from his original pitch. Bona originally suggested that legendary Chicago Bears linebacker be crying as he watched the end of the Super Bowl on TV. Instead of casting Butkus, the spot featured former Green Bay Packers quarterback Brett Favre contemplating whether he should retire or return for another season of football. Favre announced his retirement in March 2008, but changed his mind and is now the quarterback for the New York Jets.

The commercial ranked 12th in USA Today's Ad Meter popularity poll, out of the 57 ads that aired during the game, scoring better than ads for Coca-Cola, Taco Bell and General Motors. Adweek listed Bona's commercial as one of the "Best Spots of February 2007."

By June 2007, Bona had received four job offers for his advertising and marketing services. He ultimately accepted the position of vice president, director of marketing for Camden National Corporation, a bank holding company headquartered in Camden, Maine.

As for the NFL, in February 2008 league spokesman Brian McCarthy told a Boston Globe reporter, "We still talk about Gino's initial pitch at Giants Stadium last year."
