= Bonnie Bracey =

American teacher and technology consultant

Bonnie Laverne Bracey is an American teacher and technology consultant based in Washington, D.C. Bracey was the only teacher selected by the Clinton Administration for serving on the National Information Infrastructure Advisory Council, whose work in the mid-1990s led to the creation of the E-rate program. She also served as lead educator on President Bill Clinton's 21st Century Teacher Initiative.

In 1993, Bracey was selected as a Christa McAuliffe Educator, and subsequently worked with NASA on various education programmes. Currently she is an international educational consultant; in this capacity she conducts outreach activities for the George Lucas Education Foundation, and other groups. Bracey is an active member of the Digital Divide Network.
