= Bonnie C. Templeton =

American botanist (1906–2002)

- Born: October 23, 1906; Newman Grove, Nebraska, U.S.
- Died: January 29, 2002 (aged 95)
- Education: University of Southern California
- Occupation: Botanist
- Spouse(s): Charles Steinhoff (m. 1938) Chester D. Weiche (m. 1942)
- Scientific career
- Fields: Botany

Bonnie Carolyn Templeton (October 23, 1906 – January 29, 2002) was an American botanist. She served as curator of botany for the Natural History Museum of Los Angeles County from 1929 to 1970, a time when women in science were uncommon.

== Birth and adolescence ==
She was born in Newman Grove, Nebraska, on October 23, 1906, and stumbled onto her vocation by chance. In 1922, at the age of 16, she had moved to Los Angeles, where she signed up with an employment agency and worked a number of odd jobs. Among these she was sent to help an amateur botanist classify and mount his large collection of dried plants. Templeton came away from the project with a new-found passion for botany.

== Early career ==
She proved a quick study, becoming Assistant Botanist at the California Botanic Garden in Los Angeles in 1928. In 1929, she was named Curator of Botany at the County Museum of Natural History. In 1932, while collecting plants in the El Segundo sand dunes, she discovered a possible new species, a rare parasitic plant she named Pholisma paniculatum. Her designation of the plant as a new species proved controversial and has not been generally accepted. Later development of the dunes led to fears the plant had become extinct from destruction of its habitat. However, in the mid-1980s the area was restored as a preserve for the endangered El Segundo Blue Butterfly , and a survey rediscovered the plant still on the dunes. In November 1938 she married Charles Steinhoff, a member of the Los Angeles Police Department, from whom she was taking flying lessons. While flying to Yuma for the ceremony, their plane developed engine trouble and they were forced to set down in the sand dunes near Palm Springs, wrecking the plane. Undeterred, they procured another plane in Palm Springs and flew on to Yuma to be married.

While working full-time at the museum, Templeton attended classes at night, earning her bachelor's degree in botany in 1941 from the University of Southern California. This was followed by her master's degree in 1947, writing her thesis on A Morphological Comparison of Pholoisma Arenarium Nutt, and Pholisma Paniculatum Templeton. On October 17, 1942, Templeton married a second time, to Chester D. Weiche. This marriage lasted until her death.

== Later career ==
Templeton's main research interest was paleobotany and paleoclimatology. She earned her doctorate in 1964 from Oregon State University, writing a dissertation on The Fruits and Seeds of the Rancho La Brea Pleistocene Deposits, based on her research at the Rancho La Brea tar pits. Excavators at the tar pits early in the century had discarded much of the plant material they found, being interested mainly in the bones. But Templeton found records, photographs, and samples of tree trunks, cones, and branches from the pits, and recovered seeds and other plant parts in tar remaining inside animal skulls, the sockets of bones, and even beetle bodies from the tar pits. This included the seeds of many plants that no longer grow in Southern California because it has become too dry, demonstrating a change in climate. Her work showed that the climate and landscape of Southern California during the Pleistocene era was not hotter and drier than today's, as was previously believed based on animal fossils, but both cooler and wetter, with a terrain consisting of meadows, marshes, small streams, and woodland.

== Accomplishments ==
Templeton began her career at a time when there were few women in science, and many graduate programs refused to admit women. In a 1993 Los Angeles Times interview, she recalled that the head of the biology department at USC refused to admit her to the doctoral program, telling her that no woman would get a doctorate in botany while he was there. Consequently, she pursued her Ph.D. at Oregon State University.

As well as working as the Curator of Botany at the County Museum of Natural History, Templeton served as an on-call forensic botanist for the Los Angeles Police Department, consulting on the 1931 homicide of Virginia Brooks and the 1949 Louise Springer case, and the 1953 kidnapping of Baxter Shorter. She gave public lectures on California wildflowers, desert flora, poisonous plants, and gardening, organized plant shows at the museum, and was an active member of the American Association of University Women. She left the museum in 1970 after 41 years there. Scorning retirement, she founded the California Botanical Science Service, a private consulting business in Glendale, which she operated for another 20 years.

== Death ==
Templeton died of a heart attack and kidney failure on January 29, 2002, at the age of 95. She left endowments to Oregon State University to support graduate student research and maintenance of the Department of Botany and Plant Pathology's teaching collection. The Dr. Bonnie C. Templeton Annual Lecture at Oregon State was established in her memory.

== Selected publications ==
- Templeton, Bonnie C. (1932). "Methods of Preserving Cacti for Herbarium Use." Desert, March, p 127.
- Templeton, BC. (1938). "A new species of Pholisma." Bulletin of the Southern California Academy of Sciences, vol. 37, pp. 98–100.
- Templeton, Bonnie C. (1946). "Nomen conservandum proposal for the genus Aromia in the Compositae." Bulletin of the Southern California Academy of Sciences, vol. 95, p. 37-55.
- Templeton, Bonnie C. (1947). A morphological comparison of Pholoisma arenarium Nutt. and Pholisma paniculatum Templeton. Thesis (M.S.), University of Southern California.
- Templeton, Bonnie C. (1953). "A survey of the Pleistocene flora of California." Research report, University of Southern California.
- Templeton, Bonnie C. (1953). A New Record of Pine Cone for the Miocene Epoch. Bulletin of the Southern California Academy of Sciences, vol. 52, pt. 2, pp. 64–66.
- Templeton BC. (1962). A morphological comparison of Pholisma arenarium Nuttall and Pholisma paniculatum Templeton (Lennoaceae) Contrib. Sci. Los Angeles County Mus., No. 57.
- Templeton, Bonnie C. (1964). The fruits and seeds of the Rancho La Brea Pleistocene deposits. Thesis (Ph. D.), Oregon State University.
