= Bonnie Mathieson =

American biomedical scientist (1945-2018)

- Born: May 10, 1945; Illinois, U.S.
- Died: January 8, 2018 (aged 72); Aruba
- Education: University of Illinois (B.S.); Stanford University (M.S.); Cornell University (Ph.D.)
- Children: 2
- Scientific career
- Workplaces: NCI-Frederick; National Institute of Allergy and Infectious Diseases; Office of AIDS Research
- Thesis: Selective expression of surface components on differentiated cells of the mouse (1976)

Bonnie Jean Mathieson (May 10, 1945 – January 8, 2018) was an American biomedical scientist and pioneer in HIV vaccine research. Mathieson worked at the National Institutes of Health (NIH) for 43 years. She played a fundamental role in NIH HIV/AIDS research, vaccine programs, and scientific policy.

== Early life and education ==
Mathieson was born May 10, 1945. She was the oldest of seven siblings. They were raised on a farm in Illinois. She completed a Bachelor of Science in botany from University of Illinois in 1967. She researched retrovirology, immunology, and genetics at Stanford University where she completed a master's degree in medical microbiology. In 1975, Mathieson earned a doctor philosophy in biology from the Memorial Sloan Kettering Cancer Center and Weill Cornell Medicine of Cornell University in New York City. Her dissertation was titled Selective expression of surface components on differentiated cells of the mouse: immunoselection of Y-bearing sperm in an in vitro fertilization system and expression of the thymocyte surface markers G(IX), TL and LY in tetraparental mice. She was a post-doctoral researcher and staff fellow at National Institute of Allergy and Infectious Diseases (NIAID) where she researched lymphocyte surface markers and T cell subsets from 1975 to 1982.

== Career ==
Mathieson researched T and B lymphocytes at Basel Institute for Immunology as a member from 1982 to 1983. From 1983 to 1989, she studied NK cells and T cell subsets as the head of a laboratory in the Biological Response Modifiers Program at the NCI-Frederick. Mathieson served as a program officer in the Vaccine Branch in the Division of AIDS in NIAID from 1989 to 1995. As a program officer, she developed funding opportunity announcements for HIV vaccine, immunology, and pediatric AIDS research. Mathieson is a past chair of the HIV/AIDS Vaccine Coordinating Committee in the Office of AIDS Research (OAR). She was on the WHO-UNAIDS Vaccine Advisory Committee for seven years. Mathieson also served on review boards for the World Health Organization, European Commission, Canada and the Gates Foundation. She published more than 125 articles and chapters. She served as a health scientist administrator in OAR. She was the lead for HIV/AIDS vaccines at OAR and advanced the NIH AIDS vaccine program through supporting vaccine trials and developing a vaccine scholars program designed to train young scientists. Mathieson was an advocate for young people, women, and early-career investigators. Her colleagues knew her as an international leader in the HIV vaccine field and a supporter of research to prevent HIV and improve the health and outcomes of people living with HIV. Mathieson retired from the National Institutes of Health on December 29, 2017. She had a 43 year long career at the NIH.

== Awards and honors ==
Mathieson routinely received performance awards during her tenure at NIH. She won an Alumnus Award from Weill Cornell Medical College.

== Personal life ==
Mathieson was married to Donald and had a daughter and son. She died unexpectedly on January 8, 2018, while snorkeling in Aruba when she had a massive heart attack. A memorial service was held at the Woodend. Mathieson was survived by her husband, children, grandchildren, and five siblings. She was preceded in death by one sister.
