= Bonita C. Stewart =

American marketing and sales executive

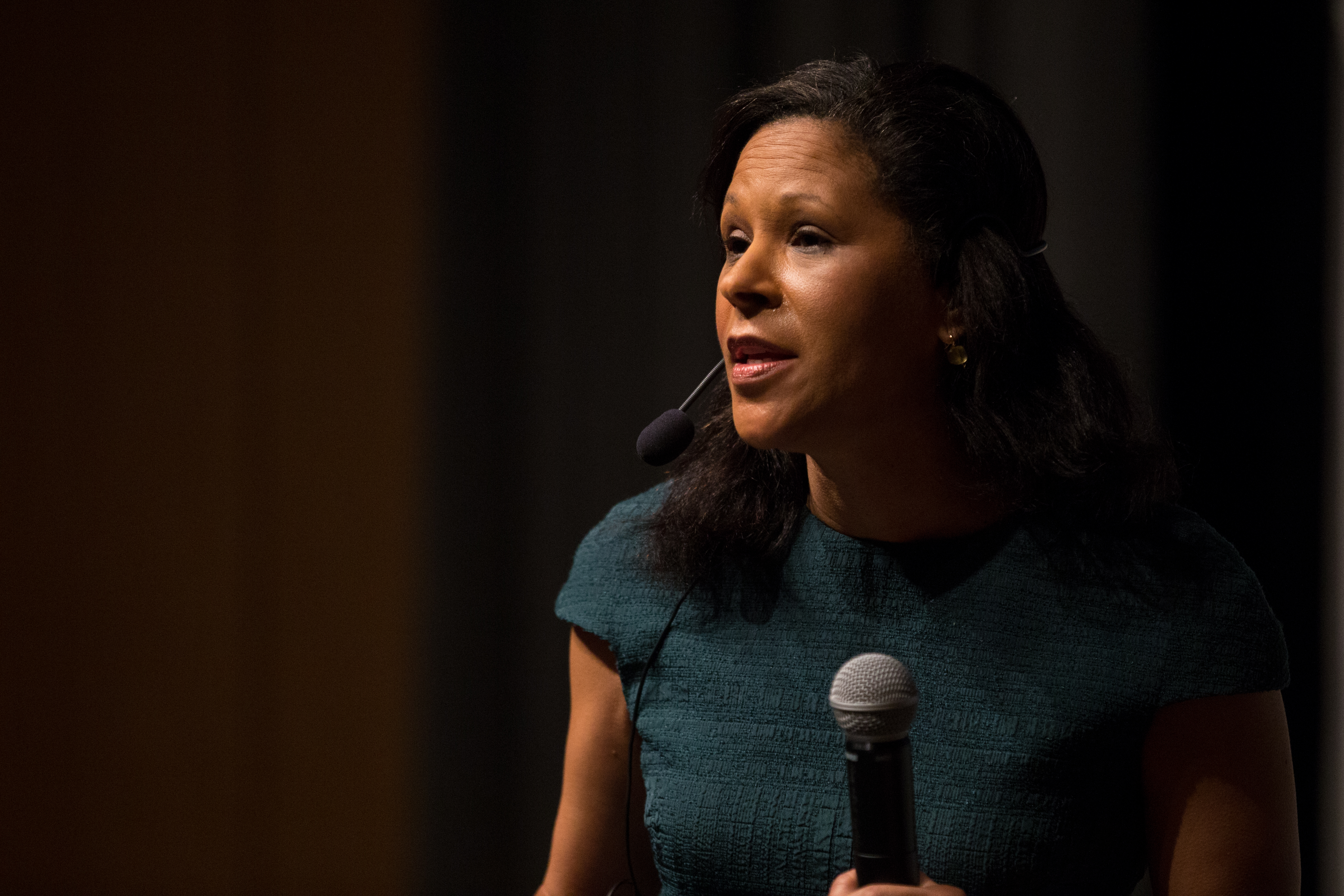
Bonita C. Stewart

Bonita Kaye Coleman Stewart (born Coleman, 1957) is an American marketing and sales executive, consultant, media personality and author. In 2011 she became the first black woman to be named vice president at Google; as of 2019 she serves there as VP of Global Partnerships. She is the co-author (with Jacqueline Adams) of A Blessing: Women of Color Teaming Up to Lead, Empower and Thrive.

== Career ==
Prior to joining Google, Stewart was an executive at IBM and Daimler Chrysler. Earlier in her career she co-founded Nia Enterprises, an online publishing, research and marketing services company and One Moment in Time, a formal wear rental company for women.

In addition to her role at Google, Stewart serves on a variety of corporate and non-profit boards, including the American Ballet Theatre's Project Plié and the Harvard Club of New York.

== Education ==
Stewart received a Bachelor of Arts in Journalism from Howard University, followed by a Master of Business Administration from Harvard Business School.

== Honors ==
Crain's New York Business list of "Woman to Watch in Tech", 2014

Crain's New York Business list of "Most Powerful Women in New York", 2019

Ebony, "Power 100" list, 2012 and 2020

AdAge list of top "Women to Watch" 2011

AdAge "Interactive Marketer of the Year" Award, 2005

== Personal life ==
Stewart is married to fellow Harvard MBA Kevin Stewart, founder of the Giselle Fund. When not traveling, Stewart takes weekly ballet lessons.
