= Bonnie Bartel =

American plant geneticist

Bonnie Bartel is an American geneticist and plant biologist. She is the Ralph and Dorothy Looney Professor of BioSciences at Rice University.

== Education ==
Bonnie Bartel received a B.A. in biology from Bethel College and a PhD in biology from the Massachusetts Institute of Technology.

== Career ==
In 2006, she became a Howard Hughes Medical Institute professor. In 2011, she became a fellow of the American Society of Plant Biologists; in 2013, she became a fellow of the American Academy of Arts and Sciences; and in 2016 was elected a member of the National Academy of Sciences.

Bartel's research combines biochemical, cell biological, and genetic approaches to study plant signaling involving auxins and organelle homeostasis (primarily peroxisomes). While studying the enzymes that release auxin from precursor molecules, Bartel's laboratory discovered that the endoplasmic reticulum and peroxisomes compartmentalize auxin production pathways. This connection between the metabolism of auxin precursors and cellular organelles led her group to new findings in auxin signaling and to the discovery of new peroxisomal matrix components. She is the author of more than 100 publications in the scientific literature.

Bartel's HHMI Professor program titled, "From Reading to Research: Introducing Undergraduates to Research from the Outside In,” starts freshmen in the first step of an educational pipeline designed to integrate them into the scientific research process. The program begins with a seminar course (BIOC 115) where freshmen are guided through a close read of peer-reviewed scientific papers written by nearby laboratories (typically at Rice University and/or the Texas Medical Center). The students then follow up with visits to the laboratories where the research was performed, and interview team members to understand their individual roles in the project.

== Awards and honors ==
- 2006, The Charles W. Duncan Jr. Achievement Award for Outstanding Faculty
- 2011, Rice University Presidential Mentoring award in recognition of her commitment to mentoring both graduate and undergraduate students
- 2016, elected to the National Academy of Sciences
