= Bonney (surname) =

Bonney is a surname, and may refer to:

- Anne Bonny (disappeared after 28 November 1720), pirate
- Barbara Bonney (born 1956), American soprano
- Charles Bonney (1813–1897), English born pioneer and politician in Australia
- Charles C. Bonney (1831–1903), American lawyer and judge
- Edward Bonney (1807–1864), American adventurer, bounty hunter and private detective
- Emma Bonney (born 1976), English billiards and snooker player
- Frederic Bonney (1842–1921), English anthropologist and photographer in Australia
- Josiah H. Bonney (1817–1887), American businessman and politician
- John Bonney (1946–2022), Australian rules footballer
- Leonard Warden Bonney (1884–1928), American pioneer aviator
- Kathy Bonney (died 1987), American murder victim
- Mark Bonney (born 1957), Anglican priest
- Mary Bonney (1816–1900), American educator
- Maude Bonney (1897–1994), South African-born Australian aviator
- Melissa Bonny (born 1993), Swiss singer
- Michael Bonney (born c. 1960), American businessman
- Richard Bonney (1947–2017), English historian and priest
- Richard Bonney (footballer) (born 19th century), former manager of Portsmouth F.C.
- Robert Earl Bonney (1882–1967), United States Navy sailor
- Sean Bonney (1969–2019), English poet
- Simon Bonney (born 1961), Australian musician
- Tabi Bonney, Togo-born hip-hop artist
- Thérèse Bonney (1894–1978), American photographer and publicist
- Thomas Bonney (priest) (1782–1863), Anglican archdeacon of Leicester
- Thomas George Bonney (1833–1923), English geologist
- William H. Bonney, alias of American outlaw Billy the Kid
