= Bonnie Consolo =

Bonnie J. Consolo (October 12, 1938 – December 27, 2005), née Bonnie Jean Pflug, was a Kentucky native and motivational speaker who was born without hands or arms. Consolo was the third of five children born to Wendell and Ruby (Sorrell) Pflug, and the only one with born with a disability in the family.

Consolo was raised on her parents' farm in rural Kentucky, and graduated from high school in Frenchburg, Kentucky. Consolo tried artificial arms; however, she found them uncomfortable and never acclimated to them. She married Frank Consolo in 1966 near Hayward, California.

Consolo's life captured the attention of the American media in the 1970s when the independent documentary film A Day in the Life of Bonnie Consolo was released in 1975. At the time, Consolo was a housewife living in Columbus, Ohio, with her husband Frank and their two young sons, Mark and Matthew. The film received an Academy Award nomination on February 12, 1976, for Live Action Short Film.

The release of the film led Mike Wallace of CBS's 60 Minutes news program to interview Consolo for the program. During the interview Consolo was shown tending for her children and driving (her automobile was not modified for her disability) while doing errands, and shown preparing food and cooking the family meal while seated on a stool, using her feet to wash and peel vegetables. Because of ideas about what those with disabilities were thought unable to do, the scene of Consolo cooking was considered a revelation to the viewing public. When queried by Wallace about what she thought viewers would think of a woman handling food with her feet, Consolo quickly countered that she washed her feet more frequently than most people washed their own hands. The episode concluded with film of Consolo driving Wallace to Port Columbus International Airport in her Cadillac.

Following its initial airing, the segment became one of the program's most popular interviews, and went on to become one of the show's most heavily requested repeat segments. Wallace would later say that Consolo was one of his most unforgettable people during his time on 60 Minutes.

Consolo undertook public speaking appearances talking about her experiences in life, and speaking on the rights of those with physical limitations.

She later divorced her husband and returned to her native Kentucky where she completed her college education, earning a BA degree in psychology from Morehead State University. In 1986 she married Ronald M. Duncan in Montgomery County, Kentucky. In 1993 she self-published her autobiography, Bonnie, an Autobiography.

Consolo died in Lexington, Kentucky, on December 27, 2005. Her ashes were scattered in the Red River Gorge.

== Sources ==
- A Day in the Life of Bonnie Consolo
- An excerpt from the film courtesy of Direct Cinema Ltd.
- Mother without arms Independent Press-Telegram, Long Beach, California, December 5, 1971, Page A2.
- She Makes Her Life in Foot Oriented World, Fresno Bee Republican, Fresno, California, July 14, 1968.
- She changes diapers with her feet, Oakland Tribune, December 4, 1971, page 4A.
- Social Security Death Index, Bonnie J. Consolo.
