= Bonnie Urquhart Gruenberg =

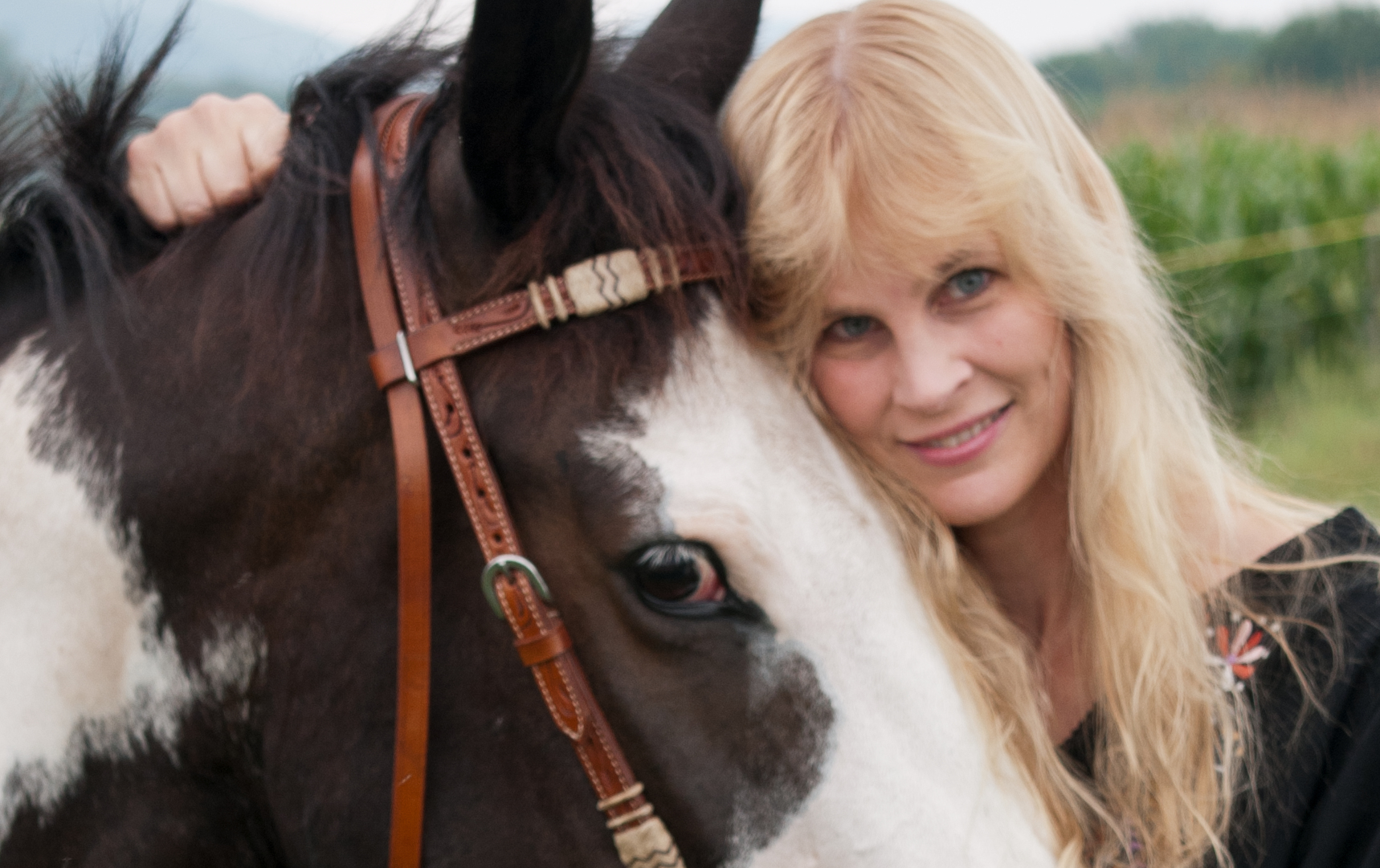
Gruenberg in 2012

Bonnie Urquhart Gruenberg (born August 1963) is an American photographer, author, artist, and certified nurse-midwife. She was raised in Connecticut and earned degrees in nursing at Southern Vermont College and the University of Pennsylvania. She worked as an urban emergency medical technician/paramedic in Connecticut from 1988 to 2000. Her published works cluster within two primary topics: wild horses and midwifery/childbearing. She is the author of Birth Emergency Skills Training and the creator of its associated workshops. She is also the creator of the Atlantic Wild Horse Trail, a virtual route that links the feral horse herds of the Atlantic coast into a chain of vacation spots and day-trip destinations.

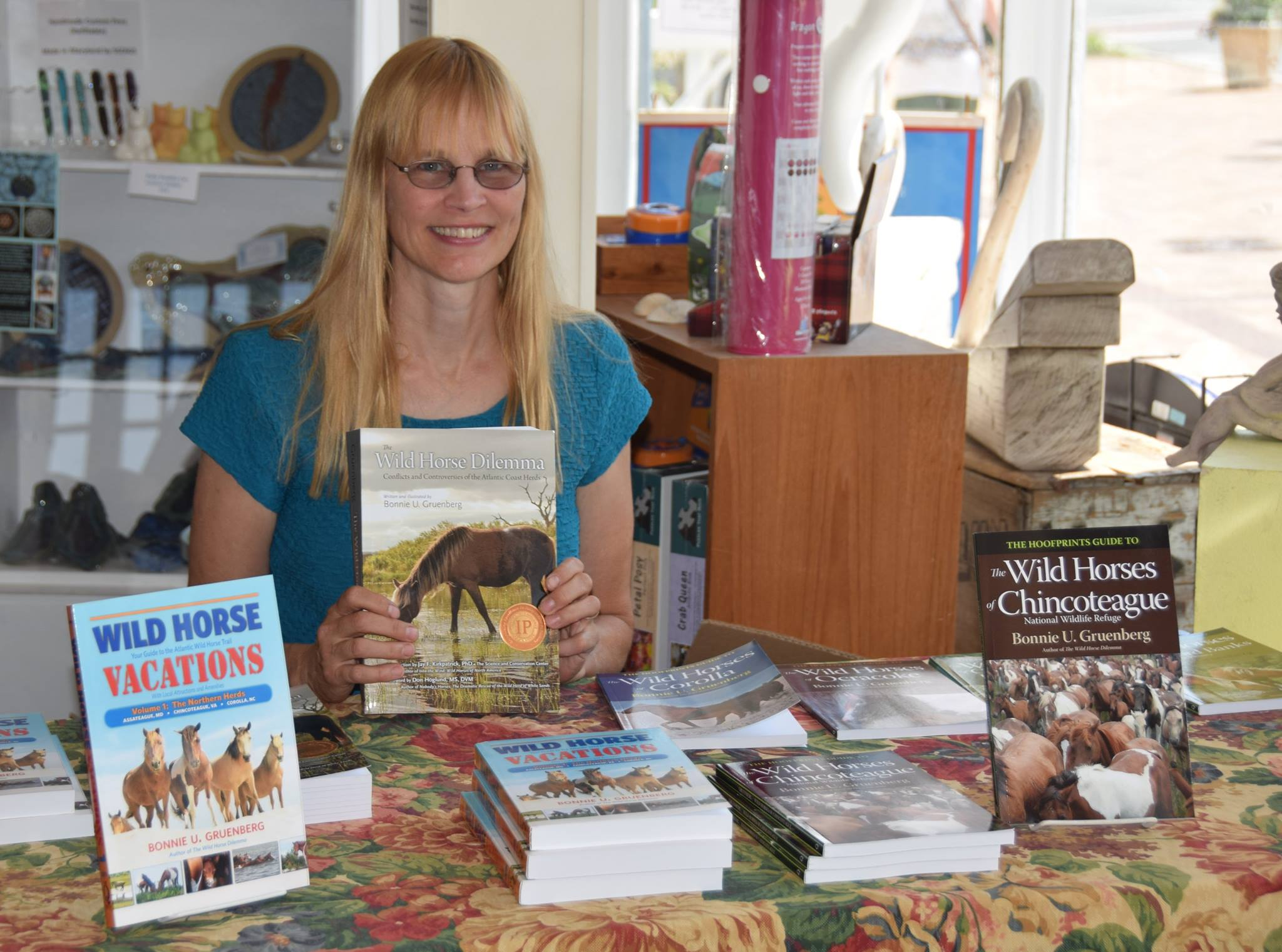
Gruenberg at a book signing

== Publications ==
Midwifery/Childbearing Topics

- Birth Emergency Skills Training: Manual for Out of Hospital Providers(Birth Guru Publications, 2008). Winner of the 2009 Benjamin Franklin Award for best e-book; and the 2009 Next Generation Indie Book Award for best non-fiction e-book.
- Essentials of Prehospital Maternity Care(Prentice Hall, 2005)
- The Midwife's Journal: Birth Log and Memory Book (Birth Guru Publications, 2009)

Wild Horse Topics

- The Wild Horse Dilemma: Conflicts and Controversies of the Atlantic Coast Herds (Quagga Press, 2015)."Simply the best work on the subject" Third place grand prize in the 2015 Next Generation Indie Book Awards.
- Wild Horse Vacations: Your Guide to the Atlantic Horse Wild Trail Volume 1: Assateague, MD, Chincoteague, VA, Corolla NC
- Wild Horse Vacations: Your Guide to the Atlantic Wild Horse Trail Volume 2: Ocracoke, NC, Shackleford Banks, NC, Cumberland Island, GA
- The Hoofprints Guide to the Wild Horses of Assateague (Quagga Press, 2015)
- The Hoofprints Guide to the Wild Horses of Chincoteague National Wildlife Refuge (Quagga Press, 2015)
- The Hoofprints Guide to the Wild Horses of Corolla (Quagga Press, 2015)
- The Hoofprints Guide to the Wild Horses of Ocracoke Island (Quagga Press, 2015)
- The Hoofprints Guide to the Wild Horses of Shackleford Banks and Vicinity (Quagga Press, 2015)
- The Hoofprints Guide to the Wild Horses of Cumberland Island (Quagga Press, 2015)
- Hoofprints in the Sand: Wild Horses of the Atlantic Coast (Eclipse Press, 2002)
