= Bonnie Ammaq =

Canadian director

- Born: Igloolik, Nunavut
- Other names: Rosie Bonnie Ammaaq
- Citizenship: Canadian
- Occupation: Director
- Parents: Samueli Ammaaq (father); Micheline Ammaaq (mother)
- Relatives: Siblings: Isa Ammaq and Wilma Ammaq
- Awards: Best Short Documentary 2015 at the ImagineNative Film festival for Nowhere Land

Rosie Bonnie Ammaq is a director and actress from Igloolik, Nunavut, Canada. Her film Nowhere Land won the award for Best Short Documentary at the ImagineNative Film Festival.

== Early life ==
Ammaq began her life in Igloolik, Nunavut, Canada. In 1986 when Ammaq was seven years old she left Igloolik with her parents and two siblings to live in an outpost camp on Baffin Island. Ammaq and her family lived in the outpost camp for eleven years. She was educated by her mother in reading and writing English and Inukititut. Her father Sameuli was able to provide for the family through hunting.

In 1998 Ammaq moved back to Igloolik alone. Her family followed shortly after to audition for the movie Atanarjuat: Fast Runner. Bonnie's parents and siblings worked in the cast and crew of the movie.

== Career ==
Ammaq played the role of Kunu in The Journals of Knud Ramussen (2006). Since that time she has made films sponsored by the National Film Board of Canada. In 2011, she directed short documentary Family Making Sleds which is part of the Stories from Our Land collection. She directed the short documentary Nowhere Land (2015). Nowhere Land is the story of her childhood in the outpost camp and her return to Igloolik. The film was followed by an interactive photo essay called The Cache, which she co-created with her mother Michelline. The Cache is part of the Legacies 150 collection by the National Film Board.

== Filmography ==
- The Journals Of Knud Ramussen (2006) — actor
- Family Making Sleds (2011) —director
- Nowhere Land (2015) —director, actor
