= Boni =

Boni may refer to:

== Places ==
- Bone state, a kingdom in the South Sulawesi region of what is now Indonesia
- Boni MRT station, a train station in Manila, Philippines
- Boni, Benin, an arrondissement in the Collines department of Benin state
- Boni (department), a department or commune of Tuy Province in Burkina Faso
- Boni National Reserve, Garissa County, Kenya
- Boni, an old name for a state on the island of Borneo, possibly Brunei

=== Iran ===
- Boni, Ramhormoz, a village in Howmeh-ye Gharbi Rural District
- Now Boni, a village in Ganjabad Rural District
- Seh Boni, a village in Jolgeh-ye Chah Hashem Rural District
- Shahrak-e Shahid Mohasan Boni Najar, a village in Kiyaras Rural District

=== Mali ===
- Boni, Korarou, a village and seat of the commune of Korarou
- Boni, Mali, a village

== Other uses ==
- Aluku people, also known as Boni, French Guiana
- Aweer people, also known as Boni, Kenya
  - Boni (Kenyan language), a language of the Aweer
- Boni (film), a 2009 Telugu film
- Boni Homines, an appellative of at least three religious orders in the Catholic Church
- Boni, a character in the television series The Trap Door
- The boni ("good men") political faction of the late Roman Republic, also called the Optimates
- Nazi Boni University, one of three public universities in Burkina Faso
- Rendille–Boni languages, proposed subgroup of the Macro-Somali languages, belonging to the Cushitic family

== People ==
=== Given name ===
- Boni Boyer (1958–1996), American vocalist, multi-instrumentalist and composer
- Boni David (born 1978), Papua New Guinean woman cricketer
- Boni Haruna (born 1957), Nigerian Minister for Youth Development
- Boni Petcoff (1900–1965), American football tackle and coach

=== Surname ===
- Boni (guerrilla leader), Bokilifu Boni, (c. 1730–1793), Maroon guerilla leader in Suriname
- Ahmed bin Ali Al-boni (died 1225), Arab mathematician, Sufi and writer on esotericism
- Akwa Boni (died 1790), sovereign Queen of the Baoulé people
- Albert Boni (1892–1981), co-founder of the publishing company Boni & Liveright
- Aldo Boni (1894–1982), Italian fencer
- Alessio Boni (born 1966), Italian actor
- Bernardino Boni (died 1774), Italian painter of the late-Baroque period
- Bruno Boni (1915–2003), Italian Olympic rower
- Carla Boni (1925–2009), Italian singer
- Carmen Boni (1901–1963), Italian actress
- Chiara Boni (born 1948), Italian fashion designer
- Danièle Boni-Claverie (born 1942), Ivorian journalist and politician
- Giacomo Boni one of the following
  - Giacomo Boni (archaeologist) (1859–1925), specialist in Roman architecture
  - Giacomo Boni (painter) (1688–1766), Baroque painter
- Guido Boni (1892–1956), Italian gymnast
- Guido Boni (cyclist) (1933–2014), Italian racing cyclist
- Jim Boni (born 1963), Italian-Canadian ice hockey coach
- Loris Boni (born 1953), Italian professional football coach and a former player
- Luisella Boni (born 1935), Italian actress
- Marco Boni (pole vaulter) (born 1984), Italian pole vaulter
- Maria Roza Boni (born 1986), Greek professional basketball player
- Mario Boni (born 1963), Italian former professional basketball player
- Michel Boni (born 2008), English-born Beninese footballer
- Michele Giovanni Boni (or Michele Giambono; 1400–1462), Italian painter
- Nazi Boni (1909–1969), politician from Upper Volta (now Burkina Faso)
- Michał Boni (born 1954), Polish politician, Minister of Labour and Social Policy in 1991
- Napoleone Boni (1863–1927), Italian painter
- Roméo Boni (born 1990), Burkinabé international footballer
- Tanella Boni (born 1954), Ivorian poet and novelist
- Tommaso Boni (born 1993), Italian rugby union player
- Trova Boni (born 1999), Burkinabé footballer
- Valentina Boni (born 1983), Italian football midfielder
- Victoria Boni (1839–1909), Swedish opera singer

=== Nickname ===
- José Bonifácio de Oliveira Sobrinho (born 1935), Brazilian advertising executive and television director

== See also ==
- Bonis (disambiguation)
- Bonny (disambiguation)
- Bono (disambiguation)
- Bonus (disambiguation)
