= Bonny =

Bonny may refer to:

== People ==
- Ange-Yoan Bonny (born 2003), Ivorian footballer
- Anne Bonny (likely died December 1733), notorious female pirate
- Gurumayum Bonny, Indian actor and singer
- Helen Bonny (1921–2010), music therapist
- Jan Bonny (born 1979), German film director and screenwriter
- Johan Bonny (born 1955), Belgian Roman Catholic prelate and bishop
- Megan Bonny (born 1990), American rugby sevens player
- Melissa Bonny (born 1993), Swiss singer
- Pierre Bonny (1895–1944), French police officer who collaborated with the Nazis and was executed as a war criminal
- Yvette Bonny (born 1938), Haitian-born Canadian pediatrician
- Veronica "Bonny" Barry (born 1960), Australian politician
- Bonny Lee Bakley (1956–2001), second wife of actor Robert Blake, whom Blake was acquitted of murdering
- Bonny Hicks (1968–1997), model and writer
- Bonny Ibhawoh, Nigerian historian
- Bonny Khalwale (born 1960), Kenyan politician
- Bonny Madsen (born 1967), Danish former footballer
- Bonny Norton, Canadian linguist and professor
- Mack Rice (1933–2016), American songwriter and singer born Bonny Rice
- Bonny Sengupta, Indian actor born Anupriyo Sengupta in 1990
- Bonny Warner (born 1962), American luger, bobsledder, and airline pilot
- Ibani tribe or Bonny tribe, an ethnic group in Rivers State, Nigeria

== Places ==
- Kingdom of Bonny, a realm in what is now Nigeria
- Bonny, Nigeria, a town and Local Government Area, and former capital of the Kingdom of Bonny
- Bonny Estuary, a body of water off the coast of west Africa
- Bonny River, Nigeria
- Bonny Island, in the Niger Delta of Nigeria
- Bonny Wood, Suffolk, England, a nature preserve
- Bonny, Kentucky, United States, an unincorporated community
- Bonny Lakes, two small lakes in Oregon, United States
- Bonny Lake (Florida), United States
- Bonny Brook, which flows in the Mohawk River in Frankfort, New York, United States
- Bonny Dam, Yuma Country, Arizona, United States

== Music ==
- The Bonny, a 2020 album by Gerry Cinnamon
  - "The Bonny" (song), the title track from the album
- "Bonny" (instrumental), performed by the Australian hard rock band AC/DC

== Other uses ==
- Hurricane Bonny, the name of four tropical cyclones in the eastern Pacific Ocean
- NNS Bonny, a Nigerian patrol boat used in the Nigerian Civil War
- A pigtail monkey who spent almost 9 days in outer space on Biosatellite 3

== See also ==
- Boni (disambiguation)
- Bonnie (disambiguation)
