= Battle of Boulikessi =

Battle of Boulikessi may refer to the following battles, all of which took place around Boulikessi, Mali:

- 2017 Boulikessi attack
- Battle of Boulikessi (2019)
- Battle of Boulikessi (2020)
- Boulikessi and Mondoro attacks
