= 2018 Boni attack =

- Part of Mali War
| Date | June 9, 2018 |
| Location | Boni, Mali |
| Result | Malian victory |

Belligerents
| Mali | Jama'at Nasr al-Islam wal Muslimin |

Casualties and losses
| 3 killed 3 injured | 10–13 killed (per Mali) |
- 3 killed (per Fulani groups)

On June 9, 2018, jihadists from Jama'at Nasr al-Islam wal Muslimin attacked Malian forces in the town of Boni, Mali.

== Prelude ==
Jama'at Nasr al-Islam wal Muslimin is a coalition of five jihadist groups that initially rebelled against the Malian government in 2012, before amalgamating in 2017 to form JNIM. Throughout 2018, the group spread across Mali, especially in Gao and Tombouctou regions.

== Attack ==
Jihadists attacked Boni from two points with motorcycles and pick-ups on the morning of June 22. Malian forces responded quickly, and the jihadists quickly fled to the northeast after a short skirmish. After the attack began, the Malian army dispatched a helicopter and sent reinforcements from Douentza. On the way, a vehicle hit a mine near the village of Dallah. According to the Malian army, the minelayers opened fire and three minelayers were killed in retaliation. However, this version of events was contested by Fulani association Tabital Pulaaku and the relatives of the victims, who affirmed that the three men killed were shepherds, including a seven-year-old child.

In a press release, the Malian army claimed three Malian soldiers were killed in the attack in Boni, and three were injured. AFP corroborated these statements.

== See also ==
- 2021 Boni attack
