= Battle of the Serma Forest =

The Battle of the Serma Forest may refer to one of two battles:

- Battle of the Serma Forest (2017)
- Battle of the Serma Forest (2019)
