= Boré, Mali =

Boré
- Village
- Location in Mali
- Coordinates: 15°7′59″N 3°29′17″W
- Country: Mali
- Region: Mopti Region
- Cercle: Douentza Cercle
- Commune: Dangol Boré
- Time zone: UTC+0 (GMT)

Boré is a village and seat of the rural commune of Dangol Boré in the Cercle of Douentza in the Mopti Region of southern-central Mali. The village is on the main highway, the RN15, that links Mopti and Douentza.

Manding is primarily spoken in Boré.
