= Bonnie (disambiguation) =

Bonnie is a usually feminine given name.

Bonnie may also refer to:

== Places ==
- Bonnie, Illinois, a village
- Bonnie Lake (Alberta), Canada

== Other uses ==
- Bonnie (orangutan) (born 1976), noted for her musical ability in whistling
- Bonnie (TV series) (1995–1996), an American sitcom starring Bonnie Hunt
- Bonnie Field, a privately owned public airport in Marquette County, Michigan
- Bonnie Scotland (horse), an early 20th century thoroughbred racehorse
- St. Bonaventure Bonnies, the sports teams of.St. Bonaventure University
- Tropical Storm Bonnie, name given to several tropical storms
- Triumph Bonneville, a British motorcycle also nicknamed "Bonnie"
- bonnie and bonnie++, free (open-source) file system benchmarking tools for Unix-like operating systems
- Bonnie's, a restaurant in New York City
- Bonnie the Bunny, a character from Five Nights at Freddy’s

== See also ==
- Bonnie Blue Flag
- Bonny (disambiguation)
