= Operation Éclipse =

Opération Éclipse was a joint French, Malian, Burkinabé and Nigérien military operation during the Mali War, as part of the larger French-led counterinsurgency campaign. It took place between January 2 and 20, 2021. According to a UN investigation, a French airstrike on January 3 killed 19 civilians in the village of Bounti in Mali.

== Background ==
The operation was set in the eastern part of Mopti Region, close to the Burkinabé border. It mainly targeted the jihadist group Jama'at Nasr al-Islam wal Muslimin. 1500 French, 900 Burkinabé, 900 Malian and 150 Nigérien soldiers took part in the operation.

== Operations ==
On January 2, an airstrike killed several Jama'at Nasr al-Islam wal Muslimin fighters between Hombori and Boulikessi.

On January 3, the French airforce killed 19 civilians at a wedding. A French Mirage 2000 aircraft and MQ-9 Reaper drone had bombed a gathering in the village of Bounti, situated between Douentza and Boni. According to the French and Malian authorities, the bombing targeted a group of about forty jihadists. However, the local Fula organisation Tabital Pulaaku provided another version: 19 men had been killed, all of whom were civilians attending a wedding. The majority of them were elderly. The injured were taken into charge by Medicins Sans Frontieres, who confirmed that most of them were elderly civilians. The United Nations mission in Mali, known as the MINUSMA, investigated the French airstrike and found in March 2021 that at least 22 people died, all of them men between 23 and 71 years old, including 19 civilians. However, the French authorities maintained their earlier version of events.

On January 8, six French soldiers were wounded in a suicide attack. Over the course of the following days, the French-led troops killed about fifteen jihadist fighters, captured four others, and confiscated arms and motorbikes.

On January 13, the Malian army took four more prisoners in the village of Kobou. However, three of them died during the transport under unclear circumstances. Human Rights Watch (HRW) later noted that two of the prisoners, aged 31 and 50, had been found dead the next morning within 10 kilometers from Kobou, whereas a third one, aged 48, had been "disappeared". According to HRW, this was part of a larger pattern of extrajudicial killings and disappearances carried out by Malian forces.

French troops killed about twenty more insurgents on January 16 and 17. On January 26, after the operation concluded, the Malian authorities said that about a hundred jihadist fighters had been killed and about twenty captured.

== See also ==
- Mali wedding airstrike
