= N'Gouma =

- Village
- Location in Mali
- Coordinates: 15°38′11″N 3°22′12″W
- Country: Mali
- Region: Mopti Region
- Cercle: Douentza Cercle
- Commune: Djaptodji
- Elevation: 267 m (876 ft)
- Time zone: UTC+0 (GMT)

N'Gouma is a village and seat of the rural commune of Djaptodji in the Cercle of Douentza in the Mopti Region of southern-central Mali.
