= Boney =

Boney may refer to:

== People ==
=== Given name ===
- Boney James (born 1961), American jazz saxophonist
- Boney Kapoor (born 1955), Indian film producer

=== Surname ===
- Brad Boney, American author of gay and lesbian fiction
- Brooke Boney, Australian journalist and television presenter
- George F. Boney (1930–1972), Alaska Supreme Court justice
- Hank Boney (1903–2002), Major League Baseball pitcher
- James Lloyd Boney (1959–1987), Aboriginal Australian man whose death in custody led to the 1987 Brewarrina riot
- Tariq Boney (born 2007), American football player

=== Nickname ===
- "Boney", a British nickname for Napoleon Bonaparte
  - "Boney", the title of a sea shanty depicting Napoleon's life and exploits

== Fictional characters ==
- "Boney", dinosaur character from the television series Weinerville
- "Boney", dog and playable character in the video game Mother 3

== Other uses ==
- Boney (coal), waste material from coal mining
- Boney (TV series), 1971 Australian television series
- Boney M., 1970s German pop and disco group
- Boney Peak, Santa Monica Mountains, Ventura County, California, U.S.

== See also ==
- Bonney (disambiguation)
- Bony (disambiguation)
