= Bonney =

Bonney may refer to:

== Places ==
- Bonney, Texas, USA
- Bonney Downs Station, Australia
- Bonney Lake, Washington, USA
  - Bonney Lake High School

== Other ==
- Bonney Gull, experimental aircraft
- Bonney (surname)
- Jewelry Bonney, fictional character in One Piece

== See also ==
- Bonnie (disambiguation)
- Bonny (disambiguation)
