= Tongo-Tongo =

- Village
- Location in Mali
- Coordinates: 14°50′46″N 3°9′50″W
- Country: Mali
- Region: Mopti Region
- Cercle: Douentza Cercle
- Commune: Tédié
- Time zone: UTC+0 (GMT)

Tongo-Tongo (Tóŋó-tòŋò) is a village and seat of the commune of Tédié in the Cercle of Douentza in the Mopti Region of southern-central Mali.

Tommo So is spoken in Tongo-Tongo. The local surname is Ouologuem.
