= Tin Biden raid =

2017 battle of the Mali War

Raid on Tin Biden
- Part of Mali War
Date	October 23-24, 2017
Location	Tin Biden wadi, Kidal Region, Mali
Result	French victory

Belligerents
France	Jama'at Nasr al-Islam wal Muslimin

Commanders and leaders
Unknown	Ismail Ag Azbay †

Casualties and losses
None	3 killed (per JNIM); 15 (per France)
- 11 captive Malian soldiers killed (per Mali and JNIM, denied by France)

The raid on Tin Biden occurred between October 23 and 24, 2017, between French forces of Operation Barkhane and Jama'at Nasr al-Islam wal Muslimin in the remote wadi of Tin Biden, Kidal Region, Mali. In the battle, French forces killed eleven Malian prisoners of war held captive by JNIM.

== Prelude ==
Due to harsh pressure and counteroffensives by French troops, Malian soldiers, and anti-jihadist Tuareg rebels, Jama'at Nasr al-Islam wal Muslimin, the al-Qaeda-aligned jihadist group, was in a state of guerrilla warfare with only a few permanent bases in the remote Adrar des Ifoghas mountains of northern Mali's Kidal Region. Because the group had only formed months earlier, there was little to no cohesive structure.

== Raid ==
The French government announced an "opportunity operation" in the Adrar des Ifoghas on the night between October 23 and 24th, 2017, against Ansar Dine fighters from JNIM. The jihadists used the wadi of Tin Biden as a training camp. The battle began when French Mirage 2000's dropped bombs on the site, and then dropped French commandos on the site. The raid lasted for three hours, and ended at dawn.

== Aftermath and the killing of Malian soldiers ==
On October 26, Patrick Steiger, spokesperson for the French army general staff, stated that fifteen jihadists had been either killed or captured, and that no fighters escaped. Small arms, ammunition, and a flag were seized from the site, and a pick-up loaded with ammo was destroyed. The French army had no losses.

JNIM refuted these claims a day later, claiming that the airstrikes instead killed eleven Malian soldiers that had been captured in jihadist raids between July 2016 and March 2017. JNIM also stated that Ismail Ag Azbay, the leader of the unit holding the Malian captives, was killed, along with two other JNIM fighters. Azbay was a lieutenant of JNIM leader Iyad Ag Ghaly, and a senior member of Ansar Dine. The group also offered to give the bodies to a "neutral body."

A few days prior to the raid, the Malian hostages appeared in a video published by JNIM. The French army refuted JNIM's claims as propaganda, but Malian soldiers interviewed by RFi stated that they recognized their comrades in the photos and videos published by JNIM. Other Malian sources confirmed the deaths of the prisoners, but claimed they were shot by JNIM instead. The Malian Ministry of Defense, in an October 31, 2017 press release, stated that the Malian prisoners were killed but did not mention who killed them. The press release also stated that the soldiers were captured in the 2016 Nampala attack and the 2017 Boulikessi attack.

The French army continued to deny that their airstrikes killed the Malian captives, with the French army stressing that the soldiers instead defected to JNIM. The army also asserted that the raid was conducted after days of reconnaissance, and that in scouting, the fighters were homogenous and all JNIM. Florence Parly, the French minister of defense, stated that "we had very good reason to think they were not hostages." This was denied by Malian president Ibrahim Boubacar Keïta, who stated that the Malian soldiers were indeed hostages and killed in the raid in a December speech.
