= Diona =

Diona may refer to:

== People with the given name ==
- Diona Doherty (born 1989), Irish actress
- Diona Reasonover (born 1992), American actress

== Places ==
- Diona, Mali, a village and the seat of Korarou, Mali
- Diona, Illinois, an unincorporated community in Coles County, Illinois, United States

== Fictional characters ==
- Diona, a character in 2020 video game Genshin Impact
