= Bounti wedding airstrike =

2021 massacre conducted by France

Mali wedding airstrike
- Part of the Mali War
- Location of Bounti
- Location: Bounti, Mopti Region, Mali
- Date: 3 January 2021
- Target: AQIM fighters
- Attack type: Airstrike
- Deaths: 22
- Injuries: Unknown
- Victim: Civilians
- Perpetrator: (France) French Air and Space Force

On 3 January 2021, the French Armed Forces carried out an airstrike targeting a wedding, claiming that terrorists were killed without any collateral damage. A UN report later revealed that out of the 22 people killed, 19 were civilians.

== Background ==
On 2 January 2021, in coordination with the militaries of Mali, Burkina Faso, and Niger the French military launched Operation Éclipse in and around the city of Boni.

== Airstrike ==
On 3 January 2021, Islamic extremists confronted a wedding in the village of Bounti in Mopti Region, central Mali, ordering the attendees to separate by gender. An airstrike, carried out by a French Mirage 2000 aircraft and MQ-9 Reaper drone, then killed 22 people, including children, according to witnesses and local officials including the mayor.

According to the French and Malian authorities, the bombing had targeted a group of about forty jihadists. However, the local Fula organisation Tabital Pulaaku provided another version: 19 men had been killed, all of whom were civilians attending a wedding. The majority of them were elderly. The injured were taken into charge by Medicins Sans Frontieres, who confirmed that most of them were elderly civilians.

Residents also said a helicopter opened fire on the ceremony. The French Armed Forces said they had killed "dozens" of militant Islamists in Hombori, a few kilometers away, on that day, but that a connection between the strike and a wedding party "does not correspond to information collected prior to the airstrike".

On 30 March 2021, the MINUSMA United Nations peacekeeping mission in Mali concluded that the strike killed 19 unarmed civilians and three armed men. They said the strike was on a wedding attended by about 100 civilians and five armed men, presumably members of a group affiliated with al-Qaeda.

The French authorities maintained their version of events; the head of the French Armed Forces called the UN report "biased".
