= Kikara =

- Village
- Location in Mali
- Coordinates: 15°12′40″N 2°44′49″W
- Country: Mali
- Region: Mopti Region
- Cercle: Douentza Cercle
- Commune: Gandamia
- Time zone: UTC+0 (GMT)

Kikara (Tondi Songway Kiini: Kî:rá; Fulfulde: Kikkara) is a small village and seat of the commune of Gandamia in the Cercle of Douentza in the Mopti Region of southern-central Mali.

The village lies on the northern slope of the Gandamia Massif (or Dyoundé Massif), an inselberg that rises 750 m above the plain. The massif extends for 60 km in an east-west direction and 10 km north to south.

Bananas, cassava, papaya, tobacco, onion, lettuce, chili pepper, squash are planted in Kikara. The village has a weekly Friday market. Tondi Songway Kiini is the main language of the village, and Fulfulde is also spoken in the region. The local surname is Maiga.
