= 2021 Boni attack =

2021 battle of the Mali War

- Part of Mali War
Date	3 February 2021
Location	Boni military base, Boni, Mali
Result	Franco-Malian victory

Belligerents
Mali; France	Jama'at Nasr al-Islam wal Muslimin

Casualties and losses
10 dead, 8 injured None	~20 dead

On February 3, 2021, Al-Qaeda-linked jihadists from Jama'at Nasr al-Islam wal Muslimin attacked a Malian base in the remote town of Boni. French troops from Operation Barkhane came to the Malians' aid, and successfully repulsed the attack. The attack came in direct response to the recent Franco-Malian counteroffensive of Operation Eclipse.

== Attack ==
Around 6 am local time on February 3, the jihadists from JNIM attacked the military base at Boni aboard a Casspir armored vehicle. Initially, the Malian soldiers abandoned the camp, taking up positions outside to prevent JNIM from fully taking over the camp, and meanwhile calling for reinforcements from Barkhane. On social media, JNIM released statements claiming to have captured the camp.

When French reinforcements arrived, a French airstrike destroyed the Casspir vehicle, causing many of the jihadists to flee. After the retreat, Malian forces were able to recapture the Boni military base.

== Casualties and aftermath ==
Local officials stated that the bodies of ten Malian soldiers were flown to the MINUSMA base in Sévaré, along with eight wounded soldiers. French Colonel Frédéric Barbry announced that twenty jihadists were killed, a statement echoed by Malian officials.

In March 2021, a soldier was killed in Boni by an IED. Minutes afterward, another Malian soldier shot and killed several civilians in the area in retribution.

== See also ==
- 2018 Boni attack
