= Battle of Boulikessi (2019) =

2019 conflict in the Mali War

- Part of Mali War
Date	September 29 – October 1, 2019
Location	Boulikessi and Mondoro, Mali
Result	JNIM victory

Belligerents
Mali; Burkina Faso; France (air support only)	Ansarul Islam; Jama'at Nasr al-Islam wal Muslimin

Strength
120 men initially, reinforcements unknown	Unknown

Casualties and losses
40 killed (per Malian government), 85 killed (per JNIM); None	15+ dead
- 4 civilians killed

The battle of Boulikessi took place between September 30 and October 1, 2019. Jihadists from JNIM and Ansarul Islam attacked Malian bases in Boulikessi and Mondoro, killing between 40 and 85 Malian soldiers, making it the deadliest attack for the Malian army since the Second Battle of Kidal in 2014.

== Prelude ==
Throughout the Mali War, the eastern parts of Mopti Region in Mali have been a hotbed of jihadist violence, particularly between the Malian government and groups like Jama'at Nasr al-Islam wal Muslimin (JNIM). In Burkina Faso, which has been struggling through its own jihadist insurgency since 2015, Ansarul Islam is often responsible for the jihadist violence, with both groups launching raids on Malian outposts. The town of Boulikessi had been subject to raids before, with the first one in 2017 by JNIM killing a dozen Malian soldiers.

== Battle ==
On the night between September 29 and 30, jihadist groups launched a simultaneous attack on the towns of Boulikessi and Mondoro. The attack in Mondoro was quicker, with the raid mainly being for food and vehicles, and only a small skirmish broke out between the jihadists and the Malian Army. Two civilians were killed and three were injured in the Mondoro attack.

In Boulikessi, the jihadists launched the attack on the Fort 11 base, which was manned by the elite 33rd Parachute Commando Regiment of the Malian Army. At the start of the attack, many Malian soldiers fled, allowing the jihadists to capture the base within an hour. The jihadists then looted and partially destroyed the base, with a non-commissioned officer stating "The men did not fight, those who fled were not killed."

Despite the Malian soldiers fleeing, the Malian government dispatched reinforcements to the area, and clashes continued around the base in the days following. The G5 Sahel then launched a counterattack on Boulikessi, with the aid of French drones and the Burkinabe Armed Forces. The French government did not commit any ground forces in the battle, and only were used to intimidate the jihadists. On the morning of October 1, Malian and Burkinabe forces recaptured the camp at Mondoro, and in the evening, recaptured Fort 11 and other positions in Boulikessi.

== Aftermath ==
Following the battle, the Malian government announced operations to find the perpetrators. Clashes broke out in the Boulikessi area on October 16 between the Malian Army and unknown jihadists, and on October 19, the government claimed to have "neutralized" around 50 jihadists, injured 30, and freed 36 Malian POWs.

=== Perpetrator ===
On October 1, RFI attributed the attack to Ansarul Islam, which was corroborated by the G5 Sahel. However, while the attacks in Boulikessi and Mondoro were not the modus operandi of Ansarul Islam, analysts suggested that the group could have collaborated with JNIM or the Islamic State in the Greater Sahara (ISGS), both of whom operate in eastern Mopti. JNIM later claimed the attack in a press release on October 7.

=== Casualties ===
The Malian government stated on October 2 that the provisional toll was 25 Malian soldiers killed, 4 injured, and 60 missing, against 15 killed and five vehicles destroyed for the jihadists. Eleven Malian soldiers returned to the base at Boulikessi on October 2. Malian Defense Minister Ibrahima Dahirou Dembélé stated that 38 soldiers were buried, along with the discovery of 33 missing soldiers, eight of whom were receiving treatment for injuries. Dembélé did not specify if all of the missing people were found. That same day, Oumar Diarra, commander of operations in Mopti Region, gave a toll of 38 killed and 16 injured. One more injured person was discovered on October 5, making the toll 17 injured.

The death toll rose again on October 7, after the discovery of two bodies, making the death toll 40. By November, AFP stated the toll of 40 was underestimated, and many Malian soldiers were still missing. The battle of Boulikessi was the deadliest day for the Malian army since the Battle of Kidal in 2014. Many vehicles were seized and destroyed in the battle, including two tanks, two helicopters, and many heavy weapons.

In a press release, JNIM claimed the deaths of 85 Malian soldiers and two taken prisoners, including the head of the garrison. However, they did not announce their losses. Two civilians were killed in Boulikessi as well.

=== Reactions ===
On October 3, the Malian government declared three days of national mourning. Malian youth protested against the government on October 2 in Bamako, backed by the Malian opposition, who blamed the government's management of the army.
