= Justice Among Nations (disambiguation) =

Justice Among Nations: A History of International Law is a 2014 book by Stephen C. Neff.

Justice Among Nations may also refer to:

- Justice Among Nations, 1927 book by Horace Alexander
- Justice Among Nations: On the Moral Basis of Power and Peace, 2000 book by Thomas Pangle and Peter J. Ahrensdorf
