= Bony =

Bony may refer to:

- Adjective relating to bone

== People ==
- Bony Dashaco, Cameroonian businessman
- Bony King, Belgian singer-songwriter
- Bony Pierre (born 1991), Haitian footballer
- Bony Ramirez (born 1996), Dominican-born American painter and artist
- Jean-François Bony (1754–1825), French painter, draftsman, embroiderer, and silk manufacturer
- Jean-Michel Bony (born 1942), French mathematician
- Jean-Yves Bony (born 1955), French politician
- Oscar Bony (1941–2002), Argentine artist
- Wilfried Bony (born 1988), Ivorian footballer

== Organizations ==
- Bank of New York

== Places ==
- Bony, Aisne, France, a commune of the Aisne département
- Bőny, a village in Hungary

== Entertainment ==
- Bony (character), the main character in Arthur Upfield's novels
- Bony (TV series), a 1992 Australian television series starring Cameron Daddo
- Bony (film), a 2021 Indian Bengali film
- Bony Moronie, song first released by Larry Williams in 1957

== Other uses ==
- Bony labyrinth, structure of the inner ear
- Bony-eared assfish, Species of fish
- Bony bream, Species of fish

== See also ==
- Boney (disambiguation)
