= Battle of the Serma Forest (2019) =

2019 battle in Mali

- Part of Mali War
Date	January 4–9, 2019
Location	Serma Forest, Boni, Mali 14°52′N 2°16′W
Result	French victory

Belligerents
France	Katibat Macina

Casualties and losses
None	15 killed 5 captured

The battle of the Serma Forest took place between January 4 and 9, 2019, led by French troops in Operation Barkhane against Jama'at Nasr al-Islam wal Muslimin.

== Prelude ==
At the beginning of 2019, French forces conducted several small operations in the Serma Forest, near Boni, in the Douentza Cercle. These operations were carried out by the (GTD) Picarde group in concordance with another French group and the Malian Army (FAMa). The main target was Katibat Macina, the central Malian front of Jama'at Nasr al-Islam wal Muslimin.

== Battle ==
The operation began on the night between January 4 and 5, after French helicopters backed by airstrikes attacked JNIM hideouts in the Serma forest. In one of the airstrikes, several JNIM fighters were killed. Days later, French commandos attacked the forest on the ground, discovering a training area and a logistics base. Several vehicles and caches of ammunition were seized.

The French army later stated that around twenty jihadists were rendered combat-ineffective from the battle. Of those, fifteen were killed in the battle, and five were captured.
