= Dianweli =

- Commune and village
- Location in Mali
- Coordinates: 14°52′26″N 2°55′5″W
- Country: Mali
- Region: Mopti Region
- Cercle: Douentza Cercle

Area
  - Total: 166 km^{2} (64 sq mi)

Population (2009 census)
  - Total: 3,363
  - Density: 20.3/km^{2} (52.5/sq mi)
- Time zone: UTC+0 (GMT)

Dianweli or Dianwely (Jɔ́wⁿlè) is a rural commune in the Cercle of Douentza in the Mopti Region of Mali. The commune contains eight villages and had a population of 3,363 in the 2009 census. The main village (chef-lieu) is Dianwely Maoundé which is 8 km southeast of Douentza, the main town of the cercle.

Jamsay Dogon is spoken in the village.
