= Kéréna =

Kéréna Kerana
- Commune and village
- Location in Mali
- Coordinates: 15°1′52″N 2°41′10″W
- Country: Mali
- Region: Mopti Region
- Cercle: Douentza Cercle

Area
  - Total: 319.5 km^{2} (123.4 sq mi)

Population (2009 census)
  - Total: 3,289
  - Density: 10.29/km^{2} (26.66/sq mi)
- Time zone: UTC+0 (GMT)

Kéréna or Kerana is a village and rural commune in the Cercle of Douentza in the Mopti Region of Mali. Fulfulde is the main language spoken in the village. The commune contains three villages and in the 2009 census had a population of 3,289.
