= Dangol Boré =

- Commune
- Location in Mali
- Coordinates: 15°7′59″N 3°29′17″W
- Country: Mali
- Region: Mopti Region
- Cercle: Douentza Cercle

Area
  - Total: 1,237 km^{2} (478 sq mi)
- Elevation: 265 m (869 ft)

Population (2009 census)
  - Total: 27,165
- Time zone: UTC+0 (GMT)

Dangol Boré is a rural commune of the Cercle of Douentza in the Mopti Region of Mali. The commune contains 34 villages and in the 2009 census had a population of 27,165. The principal village (chef-lieu) is Boré.
