= Gandamia =

- Commune
- Location in Mali
- Coordinates: 15°12′40″N 2°44′49″W
- Country: Mali
- Region: Mopti Region
- Cercle: Douentza Cercle

Area
  - Total: 2,537 km^{2} (980 sq mi)

Population (2009 census)
  - Total: 7,215
  - Density: 2.844/km^{2} (7.366/sq mi)
- Time zone: UTC+0 (GMT)

Gandamia is a rural commune of the Cercle of Douentza in the Mopti Region of Mali. The commune contains eight villages and in the 2009 census had a population of 7,215. The chef-lieu is the small village of Kikara.
