= Korarou =

- Commune
- Location in Mali
- Coordinates: 15°19′38″N 3°14′3″W
- Country: Mali
- Region: Mopti Region
- Cercle: Douentza Cercle

Area
  - Total: 1,865 km^{2} (720 sq mi)

Population (2009 census)
  - Total: 3,539
  - Density: 1.898/km^{2} (4.915/sq mi)
- Time zone: UTC+0 (GMT)

Korarou is a rural commune of the Cercle of Douentza in the Mopti Region of Mali. The commune contains nine villages and according to the 2009 census, it has a population of 3,539. The principal village (chef-lieu) is Diona.
