= Figure Eight (restaurant) =

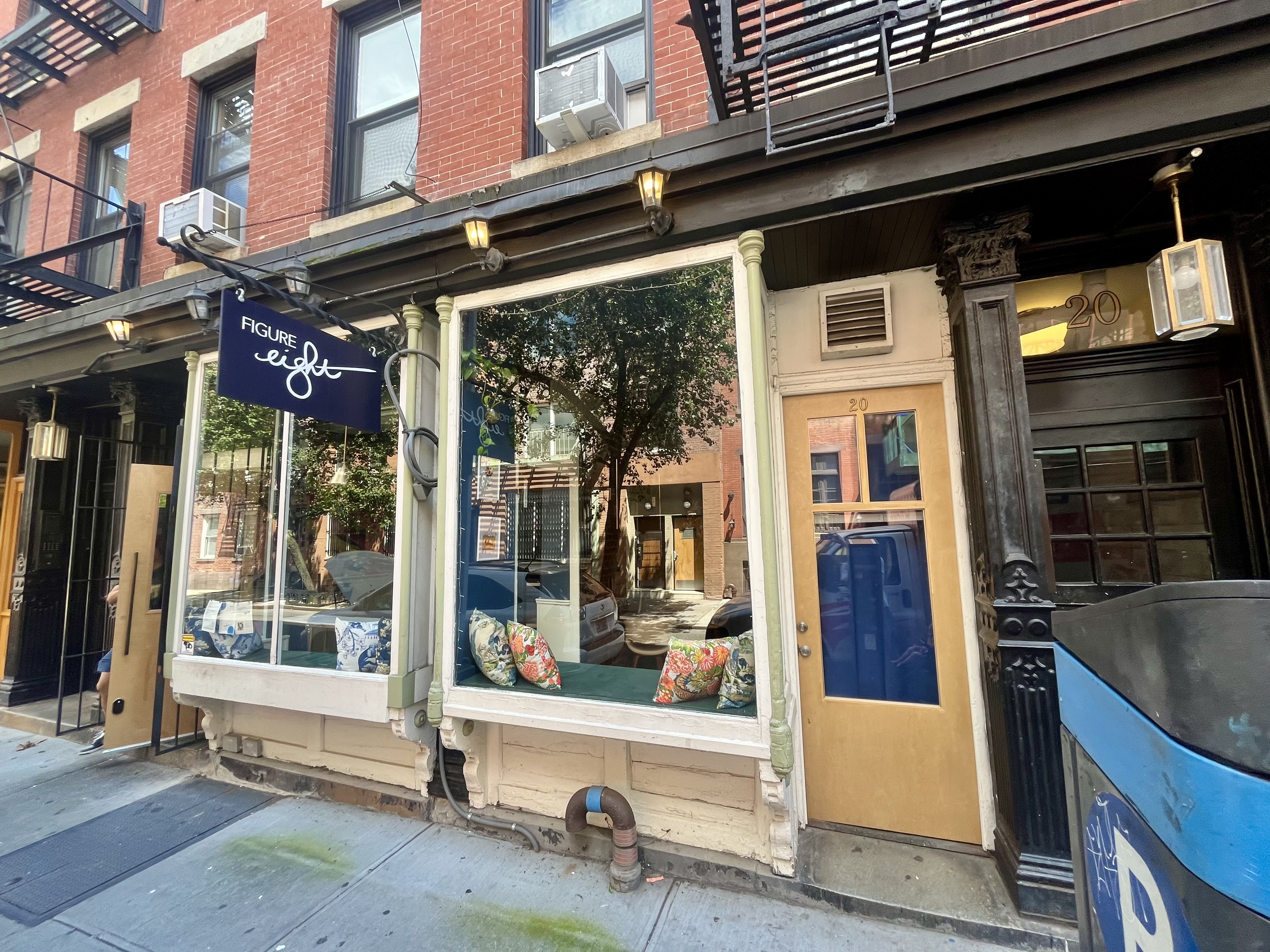
- The restaurant's exterior in 2024
- Interactive map of Figure Eight

Restaurant information
- Established: November 2023
- Location: 18 Cornelia St, New York, New York, 10014, United States
- Coordinates: 40°43′53″N 74°00′07″W
- Website: figureeight.nyc

Figure Eight is a Chinese-American restaurant located on Cornelia Street in New York City.

== History ==
The restaurant opened on 15 November 2023. The restaurant's location was formerly occupied by Pearl Oyster Bar. Figure Eight was opened by Emmeline Zhao, also operator of the restaurant Silver Apricot; Silver Apricot is located next to Figure Eight. Before opening Figure Eight, the restaurant's operators ran a pop-up in the space, called F8 Cafe.

== Reviews and accolades ==
A review in CN Traveler written by Matt Ortile praised the restaurant's "flavors" as "familiar but surprising, subtle and masterful" and highlighted its branzino as "sublime".

The Financial Times included Figure Eight on its April 2024 list detailing five of the "most exciting new-wave" Chinese eating establishments in New York City, alongside other restaurants including Bonnie's.
