= Dining shed =

COVID-19 pandemic outdoor dining structure

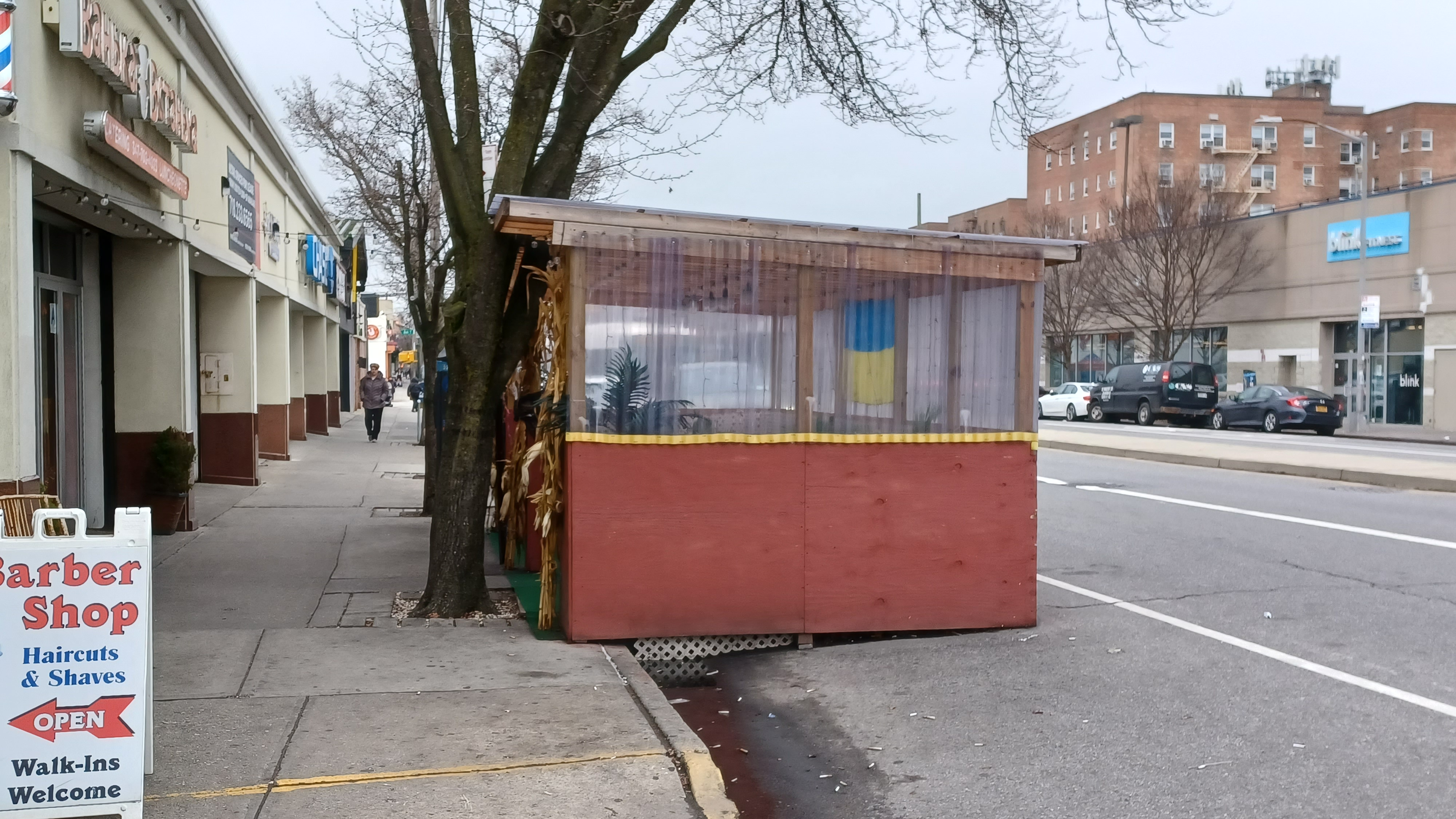
A dining shed in Brooklyn

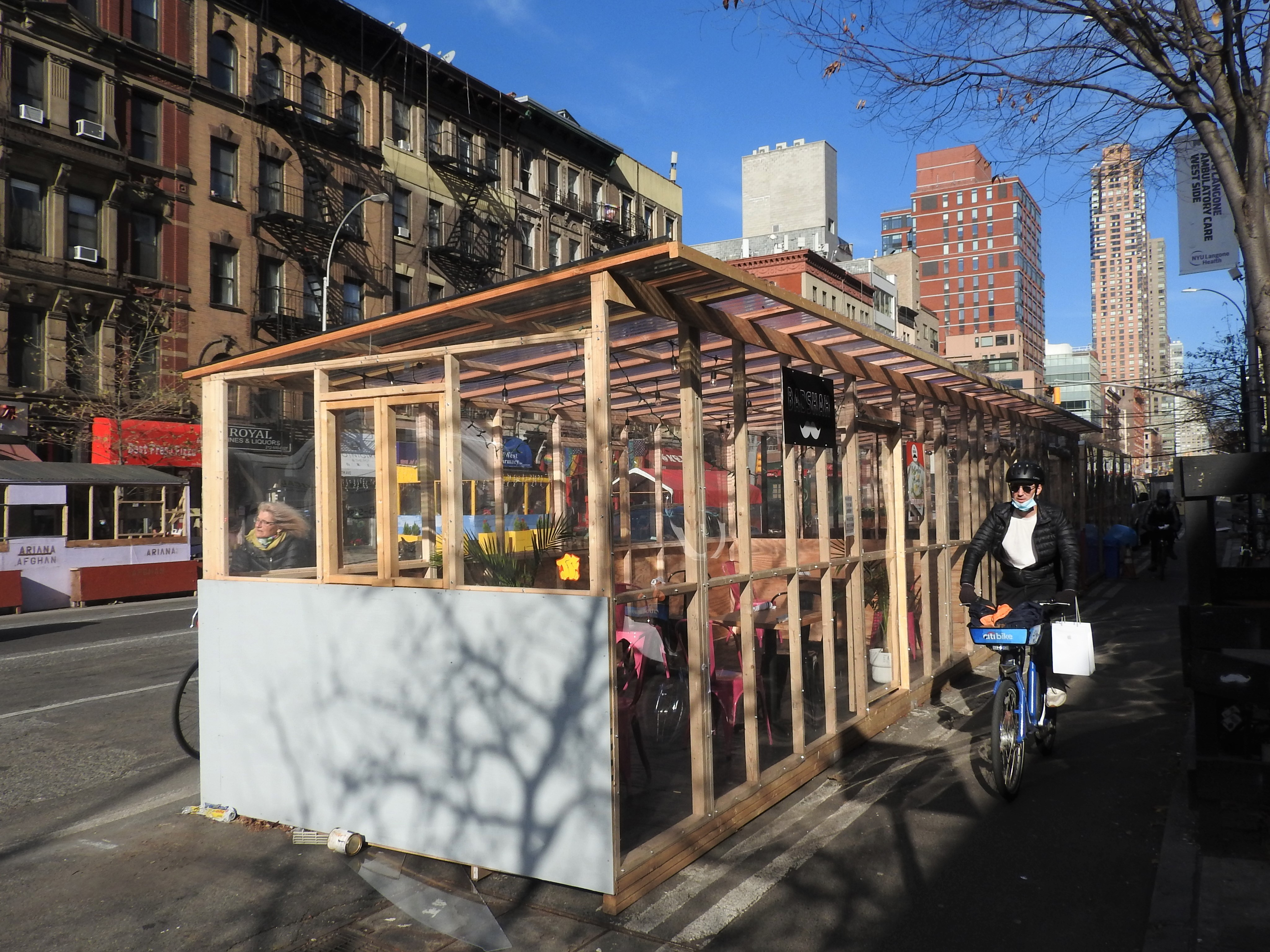
Under construction in Hells Kitchen

A dining shed is a makeshift outdoor dining structure created as a result of COVID-19 pandemic-induced government restrictions in New York City. After indoor dining was banned in the city in 2020 to prevent the spread of the illness, more than 12,000 dining sheds were hastily built by restaurants throughout the city using curbside parking space as a result of the Open Restaurants Program, which was authorized by then-mayor Bill de Blasio.

The sheds are credited with saving numerous restaurants from closure, but were controversial due to noise pollution, abandonment, attracting crime, and taking up usable parking space. Much debate arose over whether to keep them after the pandemic had waned. While numerous problematic sheds were demolished by the city in the years following the height of the pandemic, a vast number remained in use until new regulations began in August 2024, resulting in the removal of almost all dining sheds in the city.

== History ==
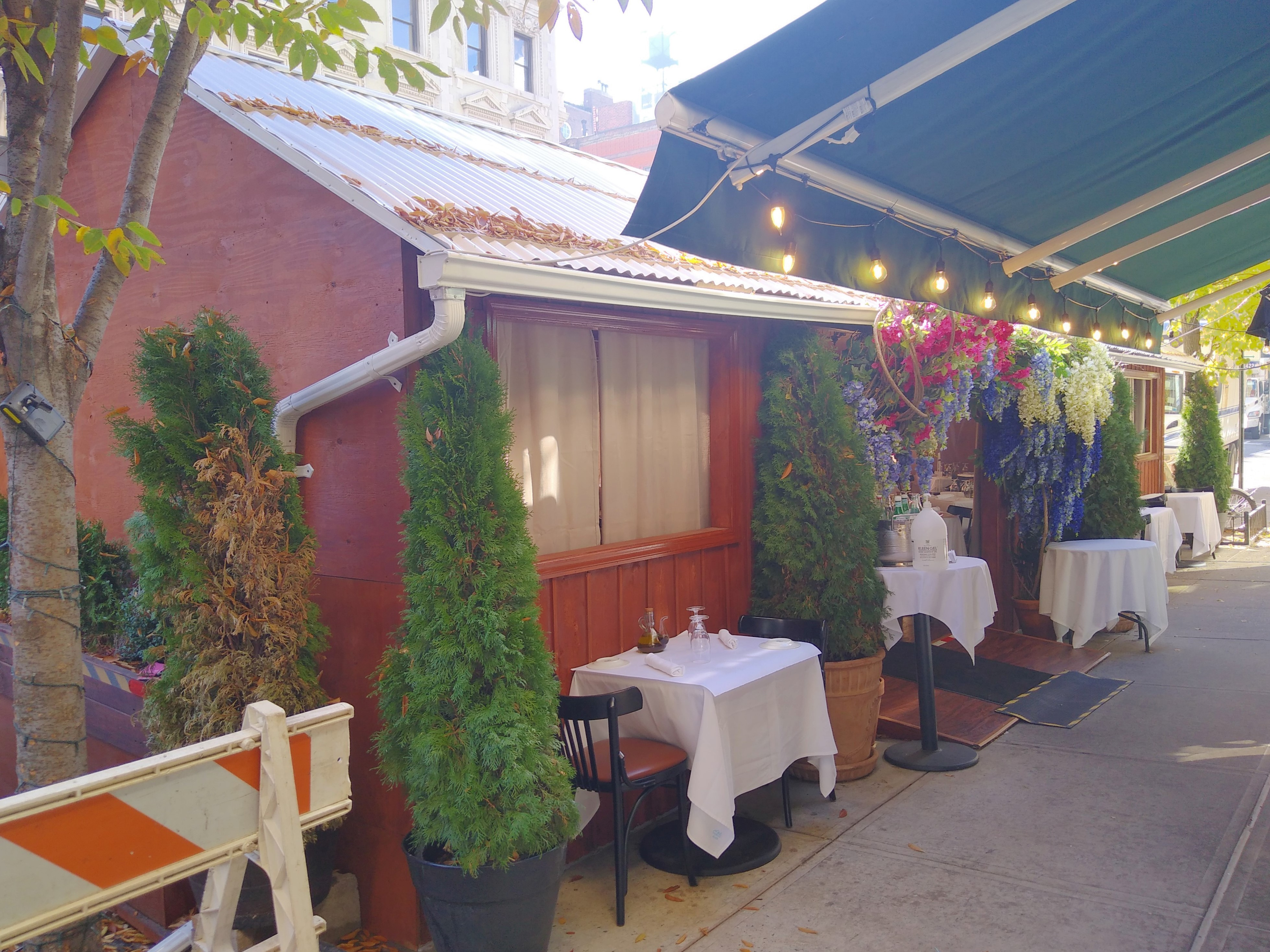
Dining shed on Madison Avenue

Starting in May 2020, with indoor dining banned, then-City Council speaker Corey Johnson and Andrew Rigie, the head of the city's restaurant lobby, wrote an op-ed urging the city to allow restaurants to set up in the streets. After de Blasio heard a Zoom pitch from Rigie, he agreed to rezone the city's streets to allow restaurants to have dining structures directly outside, creating the Open Restaurants Program. Previously, most of New York did not allow outdoor dining, with only 1,224 restaurants having licensed sidewalk cafes, largely in Manhattan. Fees, which typically cost at least $2,579.62 a year for any café taking up 70 square feet or less, were reduced to nothing, and restaurants were allowed to set up on the street for the first time.

Oversight over the program was assigned to the Department of Transportation, which set up "purposely lax" regulations and a self-certification system in the hopes that it would be as easy as possible for restaurants to use. In the program's first 24 hours, 1,950 restaurants self-certified, with the DOT being intentionally lenient with violations. Despite 93% of dining sheds breaking at least one rule, only 67 ever received fines. However, sheds set up in bus lanes, bike lanes, no-standing zones, or ones that took up more than the width of the restaurant's frontage were still torn down.

Despite their purpose to prevent the spread of COVID, a lack of knowledge about the virus's transmission resulted in ineffective safety measures, such as spraying the air with sanitizing solution in the hopes of killing the virus. Costs varied wildly, from $15,000 to $200,000, depending on construction quality. Most were built from wood, which, in addition to the George Floyd protests and ensuing rioting, caused a run on local branches of The Home Depot and Lowe's for lumber.

In 2022, despite the sheds still creating increased business for restaurants, the dining scene began to be known as a "Wild West". Tenants started more heavily disparaging the sheds, citing noise pollution, blocked access to the curb for residents, and dilapidation. Many sheds were demolished by the city, which announced additional regulation for those that remained.

Starting in August 2024, restaurants who want to keep their sheds must have an application approved, have a public hearing, and pay thousands of dollars in fees. Sheds must not have ceilings, be modular and easy to remove, and be removed entirely between December and March, while being responsible for the costs of construction and storage. As of July 2024 only 23 restaurants have public hearings scheduled, out of the 12,500 sheds at the original program's peak. Sheds taken down will revert to parking spaces.

== Controversy ==
The sheds were criticized as attracting crime. In 2021, a star sommelier for Food & Wine magazine, Caleb Ganzer, was charged with setting multiple sheds on fire. On August 6, 2022, the New York Post ran an exposé accusing the sheds of being hotbeds of public sex, including the one run by restaurant Silver Apricot, and urging mayor Eric Adams to tear them down. Adams announced a task force soon after to demolish noncompliant sheds. Despite this, the demolition was "largely performative" due to its limited scope.

Sheds also became habitats for rats, with a heated shed at the Dr. Clark restaurant on Bayard Street being described as "rat condos" and "irresistible to vermin".
