= Douentza Airport =

Airport in Mali

Douentza Aéroport Douentza
- IATA: none; ICAO: GADZ

Summary
- Airport type: Public
- Serves: Douentza
- Elevation AMSL: 984 ft / 300 m
- Coordinates: 15°00′15″N 2°55′05″W

Map
- Location of the airport in Mali

Runways
Direction	Length		Surface
Direction	ft	m	Surface
09/27	3,280	1,000	Dirt
- Source: Google Maps

Douentza Airport (ICAO: GADZ) (French: Aéroport Douentza) is an airstrip serving Douentza in Mali.

== See also ==
- Transport in Mali
