= Boulikessi and Mondoro attacks =

Boulikessi and Mondoro attacks (2021)
- Part of Mali War
Date	January 24, 2021
Location	Boulikessi and Mondoro, Mali
Result	Franco-Malian victory

Belligerents
Mali; France	Jama'at Nasr al-Islam wal Muslimin

Strength
Unknown	~100 fighters

Casualties and losses
6 killed, 18 wounded None	30 killed

On January 24, 2021, jihadists from Jama'at Nasr al-Islam wal Muslimin (JNIM) launched simultaneous attacks on Malian troops stationed in the towns of Boulikessi and Mondoro, Mali. The Malian forces, combined with French weapons from Operation Barkhane, repulsed the JNIM attacks from both towns.

== Attack ==
Around 3:30 a.m. local time on January 24, jihadists simultaneously attacked bases at Boulikessi and Mondoro. WIthin hours of the attack, troops at both bases received planes from the Malian air force. An hour after the start of the attack, French forces killed a dozen jihadists fleeing from the fighting in Boulikessi, Only after the attack on Boulikessi ended was it assessed that around a hundred fighters took part in the attack.

According to a local elected official in Mondoro, fighting lasted about an hour until Malian forces with French support "routed" the jihadists away.

== Casualties and aftermath ==
The day after the fighting, the Malian army announced in two press releases that six soldiers were killed and eighteen were wounded across both attacks, with four killed and twelve wounded in Boulikessi and two killed and six wounded in Mondoro. One vehicle and one machine gun were lost in the fighting. Malian officials also stated thirty jihadists were killed throughout both clashes and many motorbikes and "military equipment" was destroyed or captured.
