= Dallah, Mali =

Dallah
- Commune and village
- Location in Mali
- Coordinates: 15°6′25″N 2°38′24″W
- Country: Mali
- Region: Mopti Region
- Cercle: Douentza Cercle
- Elevation: 300 m (980 ft)

Population (2009 census)
  - Total: 8,504
- Time zone: UTC+0 (GMT)

Dallah is a village and rural commune in the Cercle of Douentza in the Mopti Region of Mali. The village is located close to the southern edge of the Gandamia Massif (or Dyoundé Massif), an inselberg that rises 750 m above the plain. The massif extends for 60 km in an east-west direction and 10 km north to south. The metalled road, the RN16, that run between Mopti and Gao passes to the south of the village. The commune contains 12 villages and in the 2009 census had a population of 8,504.
