= Tédié =

- Commune
- Location in Mali
- Coordinates: 14°50′46″N 3°9′50″W
- Country: Mali
- Region: Mopti Region
- Cercle: Douentza Cercle

Area
  - Total: 234 km^{2} (90 sq mi)

Population (2009 census)
  - Total: 6,733
  - Density: 28.8/km^{2} (74.5/sq mi)
- Time zone: UTC+0 (GMT)

Tédié or Tédjé (Fulfulde: Teje; Dogon: Tɛ́ːⁿ) is a rural commune of the Cercle of Douentza in the Mopti Region of Mali. The commune contains 12 villages and in the 2009 census had a population of 6,733. The principal village (chef-lieu) is Tongo-Tongo.

Tédié consists of a cluster of villages in rugged part of plateau, including the villages of Tongo Tongo, Andji, and Tangadiye. Tommo So is spoken in Tédié. The local surname is Ouologuem.
