= Silver Apricot =

Restaurant in New York City, U.S.

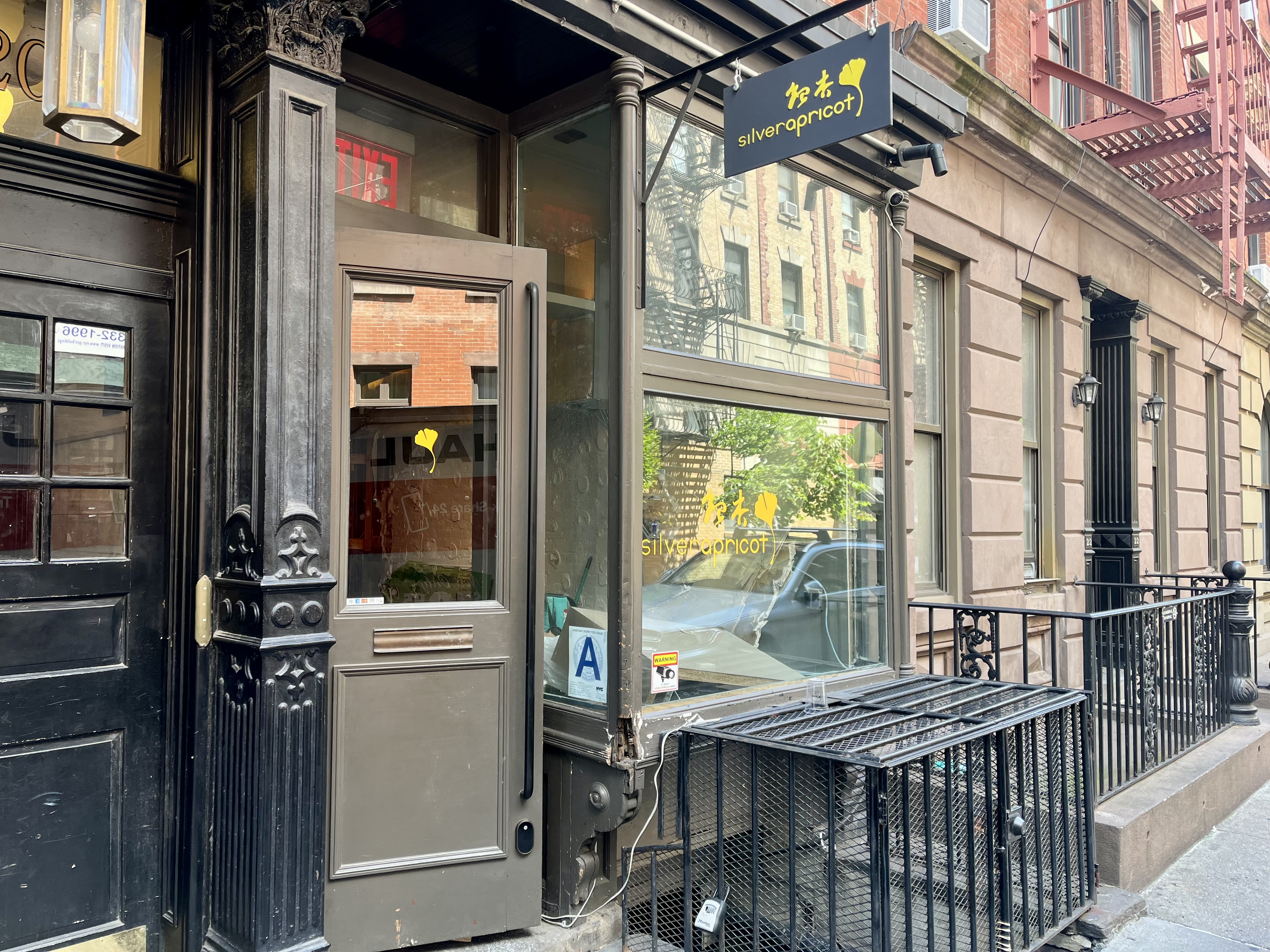
- The restaurant's exterior in 2024
- Interactive map of Silver Apricot

Restaurant information
- Established: July 2020
- Closed: August 2024
- Location: 20 Cornelia St, New York, New York, 10014, United States
- Coordinates: 40°43′53″N 74°00′07″W

Silver Apricot was a Chinese restaurant located in the West Village neighborhood of New York City.

== History ==
Simone Tong opened the restaurant in July 2020. The restaurant closed temporarily in early 2021. The restaurant's name was derived from a name for the ginkgo tree. Due to the COVID-19 pandemic and associated restaurant closures, the restaurant initially served food designed to work well as takeaway. During the pandemic, the restaurant had an outdoor dining shed. The restaurant's kitchen was characterized by co-owner Emmeline Zhao as "tiny" at 90 square feet.

Zhao operated Figure Eight during same time she operated Silver Apricot; the two restaurants were located next to each other on Cornelia Street. In July 2024, the restaurant's operators announced Silver Apricot would close the following month and that they would retain the space to open a new restaurant, Cora.

== Reviews and accolades ==
Pete Wells, the restaurant critic for The New York Times praised the restaurant for synthesizing recent New York City dining trends with Chinese cuisine. Adam Platt, writing for Grub Street, praised Silver Apricot's food, particularly the crab rangoon.

Wells included the restaurant on a list of restaurants that opened during the COVID-19 pandemic and which featured outdoor seating, published in 2021. In his description of Silver Apricot, Wells praised the relationship between the all-American wine list and the restaurant's food.
