= Justice Among Nations =

2014 non-fiction book by Stephen C. Neff

Justice Among Nations: A History of International Law
- Author: Stephen C. Neff
- Publisher: Harvard University Press
- Publication date: 2014
- ISBN: 9780674725294

Justice Among Nations: A History of International Law is a non-fiction book by Stephen C. Neff, then a Reader in Public International Law at the University of Edinburgh. Published in 2014 by Harvard University Press, the book covers the history of international law from the Warring States period to the twentieth and twenty-first centuries.

== General references ==
- Bradley, Gerard V. (2015). "Review of Justice Among Nations: A History of International Law". The Review of Metaphysics. 68 (3): 671–673. ISSN 0034-6632.
- Christenson, Gordon A. (2016). "Justice Among Nations: A History of International Law by Stephen C. Neff". Human Rights Quarterly. 38 (2): 497–516. doi:10.1353/hrq.2016.0021. ISSN 1085-794X.
- Ibhawoh, Bonny (April 2015). "Stephen C. Neff. Justice among Nations: A History of International Law". The American Historical Review. 120 (2): 571–572. doi:10.1093/ahr/120.2.571a. ISSN 1937-5239.
- Pitts, Jennifer (2015). Neff, Stephen C.; Ruskola, Teemu (eds.). "The Critical History of International Law". Political Theory. 43 (4): 541–552. ISSN 0090-5917.
- Wolfrum, Rüdiger (July 2015). "Justice Among Nations: A History of International Law. by Stephen C. Neff. Cambridge MA, London: Harvard University Press, 2014. Pp. viii, 628. Index. $45.00, £33.95, €40.50". American Journal of International Law. 109 (3): 686–691. doi:10.5305/amerjintelaw.109.3.0686. ISSN 0002-9300.
