= Pearl Oyster Bar =

Defunct restaurant in New York City, U.S.

- Interactive map of Pearl Oyster Bar

Restaurant information
- Location: 18 Cornelia St, New York, New York, 10014, United States
- Coordinates: 40°43′53″N 74°00′07″W

Pearl Oyster Bar was a restaurant located on Cornelia Street in the West Village neighborhood of New York City.

== History ==
The restaurant opened in 1997 and closed in 2022. Pearl Oyster Bar was founded and run by Rebecca Charles. The restaurant was forced to close temporarily due to 9/11 in 2001 and Hurricane Sandy in 2012. The restaurant served takeout and had outdoor dining in 2020, during the COVID-19 pandemic. The restaurant closed temporarily after a server contracted COVID-19 in 2021.

Pearl Oyster Bar's final day in operation was 29 October 2022. Charles attributed the closure to rising expenses. The restaurant Figure Eight now occupies Pearl Oyster Bar's former space.

=== Influence and references ===
Pearl Oyster Bar has been credited with re-popularizing oyster bars in New York City.

The restaurant was referenced by the character Tony Soprano in "The Fleshy Part of the Thigh", a 2006 episode of the show The Sopranos. James Gandolfini, the actor who portrayed Tony Soprano, ate at Pearl Oyster Bar after the episode aired. Charles referenced the show's mention of the restaurant to Gandolfini, but Gandolfini did not remember the line.

== Reviews and accolades ==
=== Reviews ===
In a 1999 review for New York Magazine, Gael Greene praised the restaurant's lobster, but noted that the restaurant's compact size might prevent some from feeling "comfortable".

Helen Rosner, in a review of the restaurant Penny published in 2024, referred to Pearl Oyster Bar as "well-missed".

=== Accolades ===
The restaurant was included in the Michelin Guide for New York City. The restaurant was a semi-finalist for the 2014 James Beard Award for Outstanding Restaurant.
