= Djaptodji =

- Commune
- Location in Mali
- Coordinates: 15°38′11″N 3°22′12″W
- Country: Mali
- Region: Mopti Region
- Cercle: Douentza Cercle

Area
  - Total: 3,252 km^{2} (1,256 sq mi)

Population (2009 census)
  - Total: 36,263
  - Density: 11.15/km^{2} (28.88/sq mi)
- Time zone: UTC+0 (GMT)

Djaptodji is a rural commune of the Cercle of Douentza in the Mopti Region of Mali. The commune contains 64 small villages and in the 2009 census had a population of 36,263. The principal village (chef-lieu) is N'Gouma.
