= Pétaka =

- Commune and village
- Location in Mali
- Coordinates: 15°1′30″N 2°50′56″W
- Country: Mali
- Region: Mopti Region
- Cercle: Douentza Cercle

Area
  - Total: 234 km^{2} (90 sq mi)
- Elevation: 289 m (948 ft)

Population (2009 census)
  - Total: 6,010
  - Density: 25.7/km^{2} (66.5/sq mi)
- Time zone: UTC+0 (GMT)

Pétaka is a village and rural commune in the Cercle of Douentza in the Mopti Region of Mali. The commune contains five villages and had a population of 6,010 in the 2009 census.
