= Hairé =

- Commune
- Location in Mali
- Coordinates: 15°04′30″N 2°13′16″W
- Country: Mali
- Region: Mopti Region
- Cercle: Douentza Cercle

Area
  - Total: 5,155 km^{2} (1,990 sq mi)

Population (2009 census)
  - Total: 29,741
  - Density: 5.769/km^{2} (14.94/sq mi)
- Time zone: UTC+0 (GMT)

Hairé is a rural commune in the Cercle of Douentza of the Mopti Region of Mali. The commune contains around 32 villages and in the 2009 census had a population of 29,741. The main village (chef-lieu) is Boni.
