= Koubewel Koundia =

- Commune and village
- Location in Mali
- Coordinates: 14°59′10″N 3°2′2″W
- Country: Mali
- Region: Mopti Region
- Cercle: Douentza Cercle

Population (2009 census)
  - Total: 13,529
- Time zone: UTC+0 (GMT)

Koubewel Koundia is a rural commune in the Cercle of Douentza in the Mopti Region of Mali. The commune contains 14 villages and had a population of 13,529 in the 2009 census. The main village (chef-lieu) is Koubewel.
