= Débéré =

- Commune and village
- Location in Mali
- Coordinates: 15°6′14″N 3°0′40″W
- Country: Mali
- Region: Mopti Region
- Cercle: Douentza Cercle
- Elevation: 280 m (920 ft)

Population (2009 census)
  - Total: 5,760
- Time zone: UTC+0 (GMT)

Débéré is a village and rural commune in the Cercle of Douentza in the Mopti Region of Mali. The commune contains seven villages and in the 2009 census had a population of 5,760. Fulfulde is the main language spoken in the village.
