= Bonis =

Bonis or Bónis may refer to:

People

- David Bonis (d. 1930), Canadian politician
- Désirée Bonis (b. 1959), Dutch politician and diplomat
- Francesco De Bonis (b. 1982), Italian road bicycle racer
- Giambattista Bonis (b. 1926), Italian footballer (soccer player)
- György Bónis (1914-1985), Hungarian jurist and researcher of legal history
- Mélanie Bonis (1858-1937), French composer
- Nicolas Bonis (b. 1981), French professional footballer (soccer player)

Places

- Bonis Airfield, an airfield on Bougainville Island during World War II
- Bonis Peninsula, a peninsula on Bougainville Island, Papua New Guinea

Other

- Bonis Hall, a former country house in England

== See also ==
- Boni (disambiguation)
- Curator bonis
- De bonis non administratis
- Arrestandis bonis ne dissipentur
- Arresto facto super bonis mercatorum alienigenorum
- List of Latin phrases
