= Yvette Bonny =

Haitian Canadian pediatrician

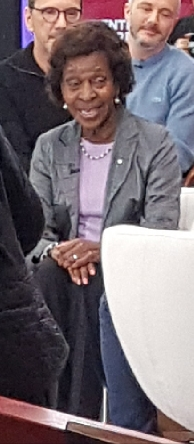
- Yvette Bonny (2019)
- Born: July 20, 1938 (age 87); Port-au-Prince, Haiti
- Education: University of Haiti
- Occupation: Pediatrician
- Employer(s): Hôpital Maisonneuve-Rosemont, Université de Montréal
- Known for: First pediatric bone marrow transplant in eastern Canada
- Awards: Order of Canada (2008)

Yvette Bonny (born 1938) is a Haitian Canadian pediatrician. She arrived in Canada in 1962 where, unusually for a black immigrant, she become established as a doctor. In April 1980, she performed the first bone marrow transplant on a child in eastern Canada. As head of the paediatric bone marrow transplantation unit at Montreal's Hôpital Maisonneuve-Rosemont until 1998, she performed all the transplants herself. From 1972, Bonny was also a professor in the department of medicine at the Université de Montréal. She has received many awards and distinctions including the Order of Canada and the Queen Elizabeth II Diamond Jubilee Medal.

== Biography ==
Born in Port-au-Prince, Haiti, on 20 July 1938, Yvette Bonny always wanted to become a medical doctor like her grandfather. After she had graduated from the department of medicine at the University of Haiti, in 1962 she arrived in Montreal, Canada, to continue her studies. She specialized first in paediatrics at the Sainte-Justine Hospital. She had then hoped to return to Haiti but in view of the deteriorating political situation there, her parents encouraged her to stay in Canada. She therefore decided to extend her studies to haematology, receiving fellowships at the Hôpital Saint-Antoine in Paris and at the Royal Victoria Hospital in Montreal.

== Career ==
In 1970, at a time when most physicians were men, Bonny was engaged by the Maisonneuve-Rosemont Hospital, becoming one the first black women doctors to practice in Quebec. It was in April 1980 that she performed one of the first bone marrow transplants on a child. (The first being John Melbrew of Montreal, in 1979) The patient, Sonia Sasseville, later became a nurse at the same hospital. The operation proved to be a significant development in the treatment of children's ailments such as leukaemia and sickle cell anaemia. Heading the unit until 1998, Bonny herself performed all the subsequent bone marrow transplants on children.

Bonny has taught medicine at the Université de Montréal from 1972, becoming a clinical professor in 1980. She has contributed to research on serious afflictions for children including leukaemia, cancer and drepanocytosis.

== Personal life ==
Bonny was married to the geographer and Arctic explorer Pierre Gadbois with whom she had a daughter, Nathalie. Gadbois died in 2010. In addition to her professional commitments, she supported young people from different cultural communities living in Montreal. These included young Haitian immigrants. She has served on the board of Entraide bénévole Kouzin Kouzin’, an organization which strives to integrate young people into Quebec society. She has also contributed to Leucan in its quest to support children suffering from cancer and their families.
