= Boni (department) =

- Department
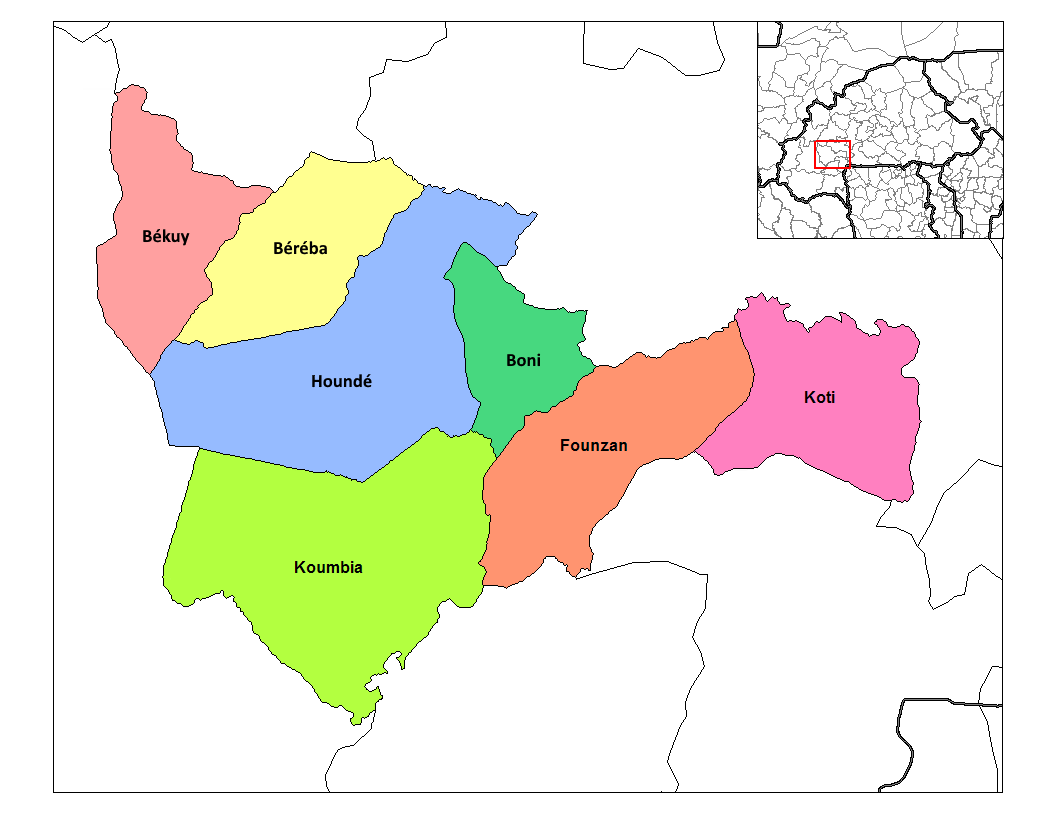
- Boni Department location in the province
- Country: Burkina Faso
- Region: Hauts-Bassins Region
- Province: Tuy Province

Population (2012)
  - Total: 16,377
- Time zone: UTC+0 (GMT 0)

Boni is a department or commune of Tuy Province in Burkina Faso.
