= List of storms named Bonny =

The name Bonny has been used for four tropical cyclones in the Eastern Pacific Ocean.

- Tropical Storm Bonny (1960), formed southwest of Mexico and moved northwestward; did not make landfall.
- Tropical Storm Bonny (1968), moved parallel to Mexico but did not affect land.
- Tropical Storm Bonny (1972), never came near land and caused no known impact.
- Hurricane Bonny (1976), a Category 1 hurricane that formed near Mexico but moved out to sea.

== See also ==
- Tropical Storm Bonnie, alternate spelling of the name, which is used for tropical cyclones in the Atlantic Ocean.
