= Diona, Mali =

Diona
- Village
- Location in Mali
- Coordinates: 15°19′38″N 3°14′3″W
- Country: Mali
- Region: Mopti Region
- Cercle: Douentza Cercle
- Commune: Korarou
- Time zone: UTC+0 (GMT)

Diona is a village and seat of the commune of Korarou in the Cercle of Douentza in the Mopti Region of southern-central Mali.
