= Battle of Boulikessi (2020) =

Battle between JNIM and French forces in Mali

- Part of the Mali War
Date	30–31 October 2020
Location	Boulikessi, Mali
Result	French victory

Belligerents
France	JNIM

Strength
Several dozens of Special Forces soldiers Two mirage 2000; Helicopters	More than 50 militants

Casualties and losses
None	50 killed 4 captured

The battle of Boulikessi took place on October 30 and 31, 2020 during the Mali War.

== Battle ==
On the evening of October 30, 2020, a French army operation was launched against a group of jihadists of JNIM while the latter were preparing an attack on the Malian locality of Boulikessi, near the border with Burkina Faso. The jihadist column on motorcycles was first spotted by a drone. While the combatants on motorcycles regrouped and hid under trees, an airstrike was carried out by two French Mirage 2000D fighters. Several dozen Special Forces soldiers from Operation Sabre then intervened on the ground with the support of drone and helicopter strikes. The fighting continued until the early hours of the morning.

== Aftermath ==
On November 2, the French Minister of the Armed Forces, Florence Parly, announced that more than 50 jihadists had been neutralized in the operation. About fifty weapons were also seized and about thirty motorcycles destroyed. General Lecointre, Chief of Staff of the armed forces, for his part gave the same day an assessment of about sixty neutralized jihadists. The spokesman for the staff, Frédéric Barbry, also mentions the capture of four combatants.
