= Now Boni =

Now Boni نوبني
- Village
- Location within Iran
- Coordinates: 28°20′41″N 57°46′06″E
- Country: Iran
- Province: Kerman
- County: Anbarabad
- Bakhsh: Esmaili
- Rural District: Ganjabad

Population (2006)
  - Total: 389
- Time zone: UTC+3:30 (IRST)
  - Summer (DST): UTC+4:30 (IRDT)

Now Boni (Persian: نوبني, also Romanized as Now Bonī; also known as Noh Bonī) is a village in Ganjabad Rural District, Esmaili District, Anbarabad County, Kerman Province, Iran. At the 2006 census, its population was 389, in 82 families.
