= Bonnie Field =

VanEffen International
- IATA: none; ICAO: none; FAA LID: 6Y4

Summary
- Airport type: Public
- Owner: William J. VanEffen
- Serves: Rock, Michigan
- Elevation AMSL: 970 ft (300 m)
- Coordinates: 46°03′08″N 087°15′29″W
- Interactive map of VanEffen International

Runways
| Direction | Length | | Surface |
| Direction | ft | m | Surface |
|---|---|---|---|
| 12/30 | 2,600 | 792 | Turf |

Statistics (2018)
- Aircraft operations: 50
- Source: Federal Aviation Administration

VanEffen International (FAA LID: 6Y4) is a privately owned, public-use airport in Marquette County, Michigan, United States. It located is 4 nautical miles (7 km) southwest of the central business district of Rock, Michigan. Nearby airports include Sawyer International, Delta County Airport in Escanaba, and Ford Airport in Iron Mountain.

== Facilities and aircraft ==
Bonnie Field covers an area of 120 acres (49 ha) and has one runway designated 12/30 with a 2,600 by 100 ft (792 by 30 m) turf surface. For the 12-month period ending December 31, 2018, the airport had 50 general aviation aircraft operations.
