= Battle of the Serma Forest (2017) =

2017 battle of the Mali war

- Part of Mali War
Date	May 30 – June 1, 2017
Location	Serma Forest, Burkinabe-Malian border, Mali 14°51′25″N 2°15′48″W
Result	French victory

Belligerents
France; French Army; 2nd Foreign Parachute Regiment	Ansarul Islam; Jama'at Nasr al-Islam wal Muslimin

Strength
70 men Several aircraft and drones	50 men

Casualties and losses
1 injured	20 killed or injured

The battle of the Serma Forest took place between French forces and Ansarul Islam and Jama'at Nasr al-Islam wal Muslimin jihadists between May 30 and June 1, 2017, in the Serma Forest in Mali.

== Prelude ==
The French, Malian, and Burkinabe militaries had previously led missions to eject jihadists from the Fhero and Foulsare forests along the Burkinabe-Malian border in early 2017. After receiving intelligence on a new joint Ansarul Islam and JNIM hideout in the Serma Forest along the border, French troops positioned themselves for a raid.

== Battle ==
The raid was launched by French troops on the night of May 30. French helicopters circled the jihadists' position, followed by the release of French paratroopers from the 2nd Foreign Parachute Regiment onto the site. The French army stated that twenty jihadists were neutralized during the raid, with none being taken prisoner. One French soldier was injured. French general Bruno Guibert stated that unlike previous hideouts, the Serma Forest katiba (local jihadist clique) was more organized, and that there were also children in the camp. Due to the difficulty of identifying targets, sixty percent of the jihadists were able to escape.
