= List of storms named Bonnie =

The name Bonnie has been used for ten tropical cyclones worldwide, eight in the Atlantic Ocean (one of which crossed over into the eastern Pacific Ocean) and one each in the Western Pacific and the Australian region of the Southern Hemisphere.

In the Atlantic:

- Hurricane Bonnie (1980), moved north over the central Atlantic Ocean, peaking at Category 2 strength.
- Hurricane Bonnie (1986), a minimal hurricane that hit Beaumont-Port Arthur, Texas, causing light damage.
- Hurricane Bonnie (1992), tracked eastward over the Atlantic, peaking at Category 2 strength, and striking the Azores as a tropical storm.
- Hurricane Bonnie (1998), struck Wilmington, North Carolina, at just under Category 3 strength.
- Tropical Storm Bonnie (2004), struck the Florida Panhandle, and caused heavy rainfall along the East Coast of the United States.
- Tropical Storm Bonnie (2010), struck the eastern Florida coast causing minimal damage.
- Tropical Storm Bonnie (2016), weakened to tropical depression strength just prior to striking Charleston, South Carolina, then degenerated into a post-tropical cyclone but later re-generated into a tropical storm after emerging over the ocean.
- Hurricane Bonnie (2022), made landfall near the Costa Rica–Nicaragua border as a tropical storm, crossed over intact into the eastern Pacific Ocean, and strengthened into a Category 3 hurricane.

In the Western Pacific:

- Tropical Storm Bonnie (1978) (T7810, 11W, Gading), struck Vietnam.

In the Australian region:

- Cyclone Bonnie (2002), caused heavy rainfall and gusty winds in Timor and Sumba; flash flooding in Sumba killed 19 people.

== See also ==
- Hurricane Bonny, alternate spelling of the name, which was used for storms in the Eastern Pacific Ocean.
