= Bonny Estuary =

Estuary in Rivers State, Nigeria

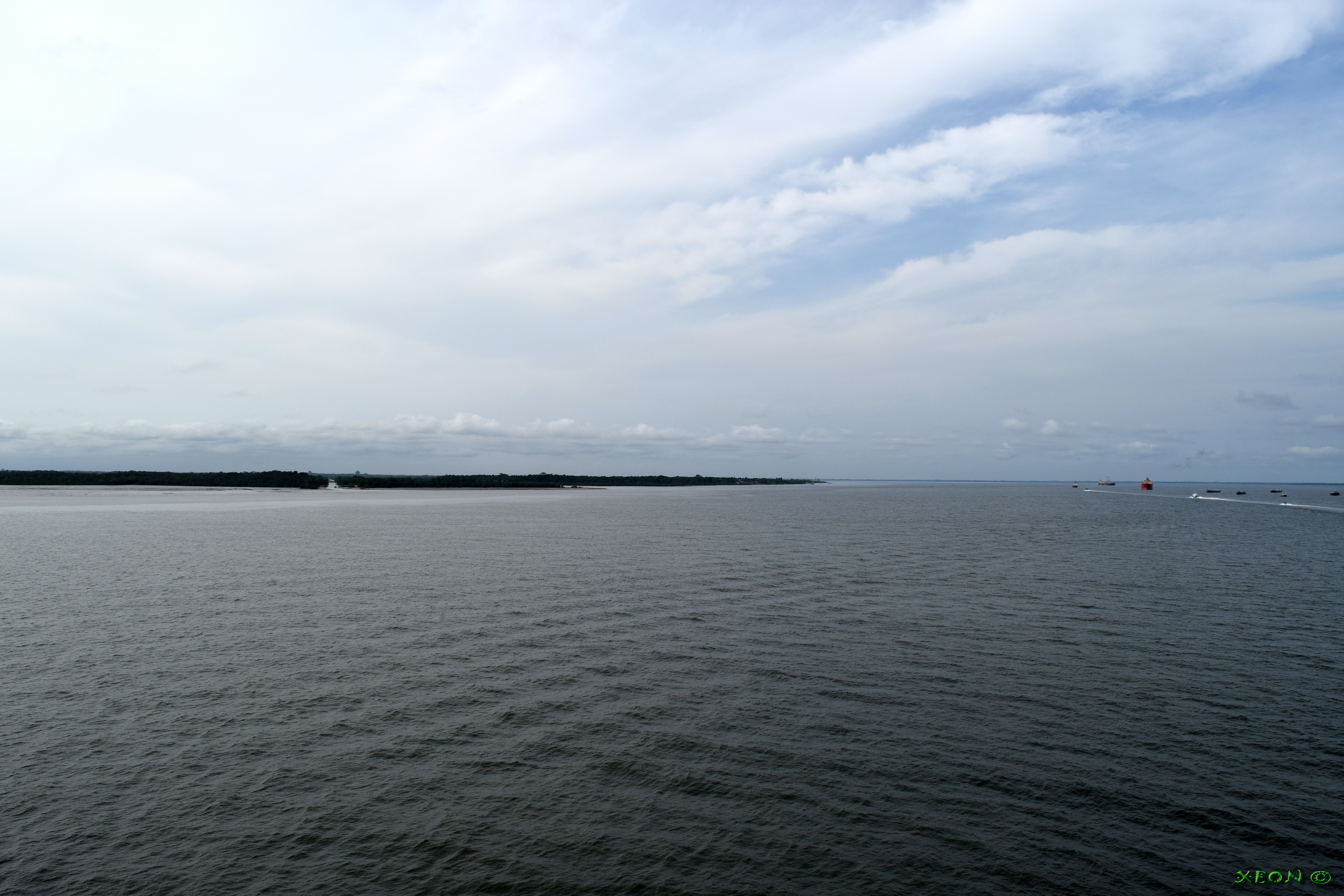
Bonny River Entrance

The Bonny Estuary or Bight of Bonny is estuary on the coast of Rivers State, Nigeria near Port Harcourt. It forms part of the Campo River delta. The area is dominated by mangrove swamp, similar in vegetation to the estuarine area of the Niger Delta.

== Pollution ==
A significant inland water body is located behind the suburban Port Harcourt neighborhood of Amadi-Ama. This is the Amadi Creek, an estuary that is located upstream from the Bight of Benin on the north bank of the Bonny River .In addition to the harmful oil spills, the waterway is also battling the swirling toxicity of plastic trash, endangering the species.
