= Danièle Boni-Claverie =

Ivorian politician and journalist

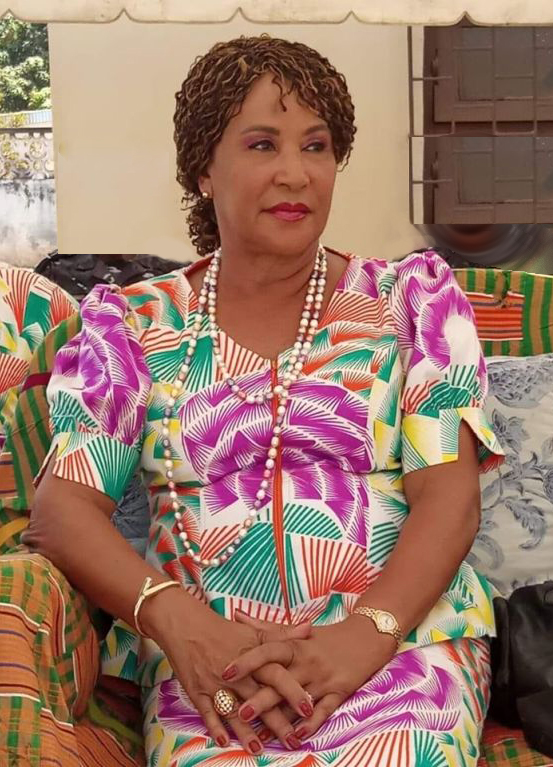
- Born: c. 1942 (age 83–84); Tiassalé, Ivory Coast
- Occupations: Journalist and politician
- Political party: Democratic Party of Côte d'Ivoire

Danièle Boni-Claverie (born c. 1942) is a journalist and politician in the Ivory Coast. She served in the country's cabinet and was founding president of the Union Républicaine pour la démocratie.

== Biography ==
The daughter of Alphonse Boni, she was born in Tiassalé. She worked as a journalist, becoming chief editor for a newspaper and then head of Radiodiffusion Television Ivoirienne (RTI).

Formerly a member of the Democratic Party of Côte d'Ivoire, Boni-Claverie served as Minister of Communications in the government of Daniel Kablan Duncan from 1993 to 1999. She served as Minister of Women and the Family and Children in the government of Gilbert Aké from 2010 to 2011.

She was arrested in October 2016 after taking part in a demonstration requesting for the withdrawal of the country's new draft constitution.

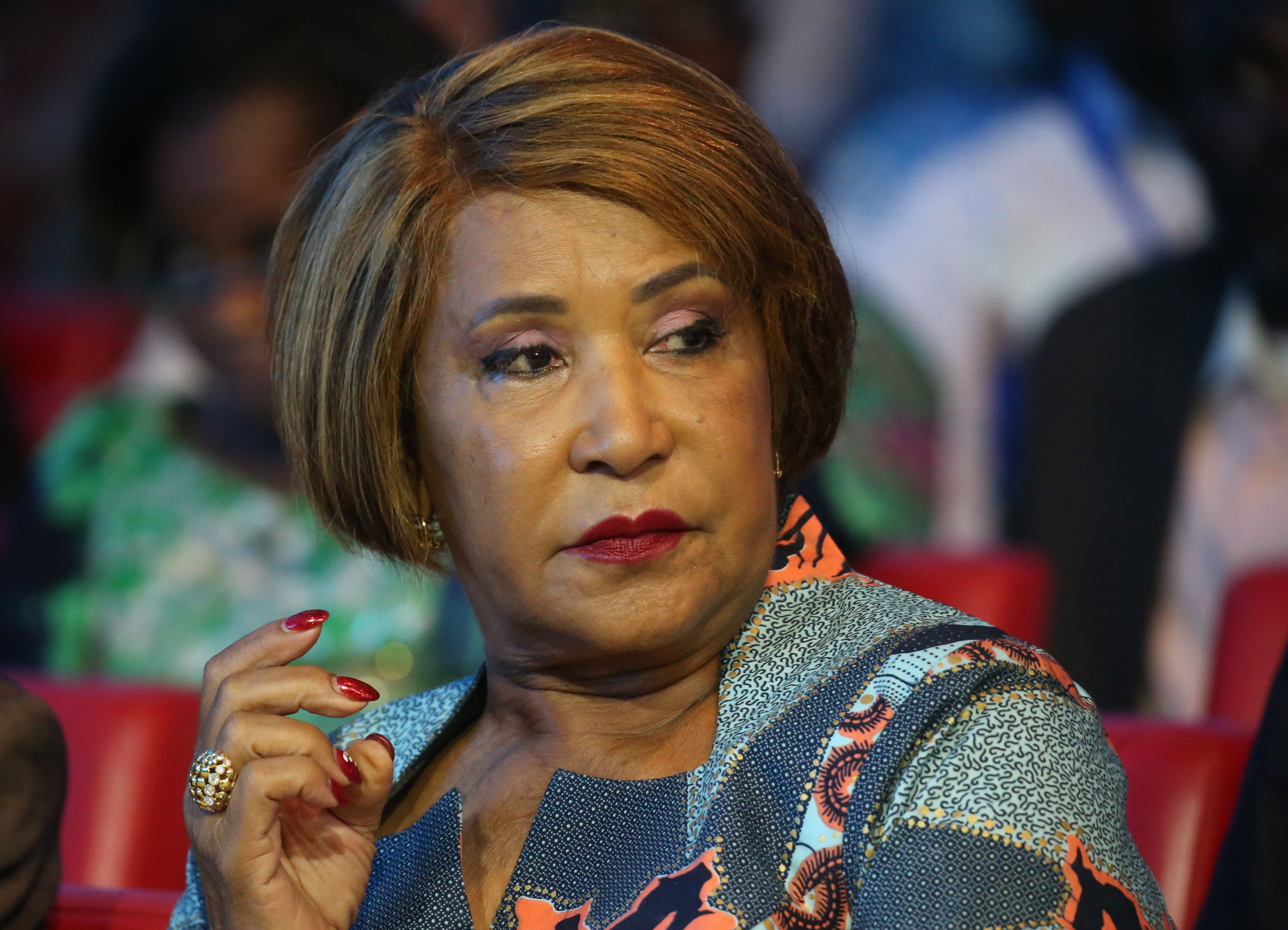
