= Bony Dashaco =

Cameroonian businessman

Bony Dashaco NX
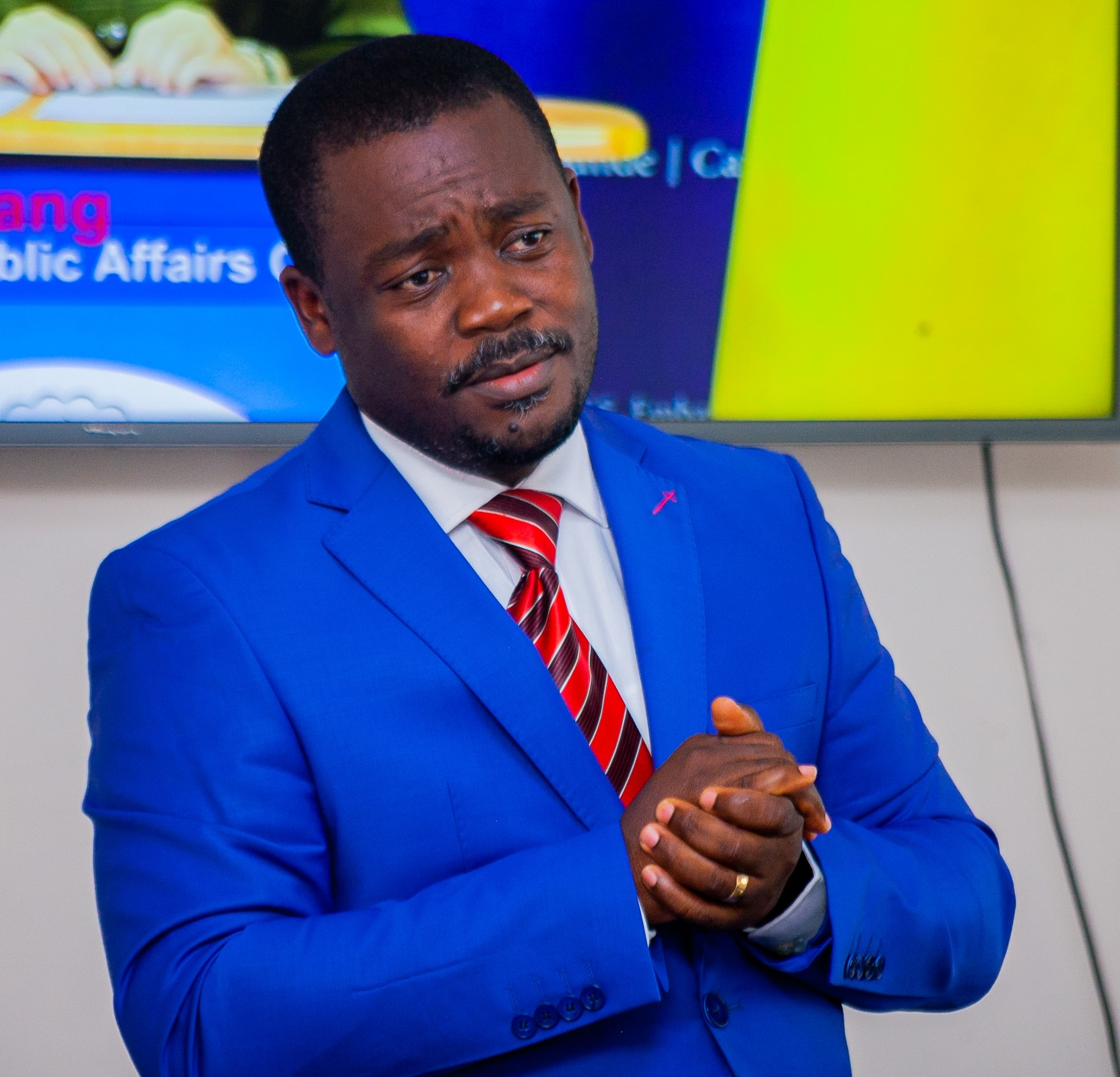
- Bony Dashaco
- Born: Boniface Abayo Dashaco; 1 December 1976 (age 49); Buea, Southwest Region (Cameroon)
- Education: University of Ibadan; London School of Business and Finance

Bony Dashaco (born Boniface Abayo Dashaco on 1 December 1976), is a Cameroonian businessman, Chairman of the African Center for Marketing, Advertising and Research (ACMAR) media group

In 2014, he was nominated as an "African leader of tomorrow" by the Institut Choiseul for International Politics and Geoeconomics as a person below the age of 40 who has impacted society. In October 2016, Institut Choiseul ranked him #36 on the list of top 100 African managers below the age of 40.

== Career ==
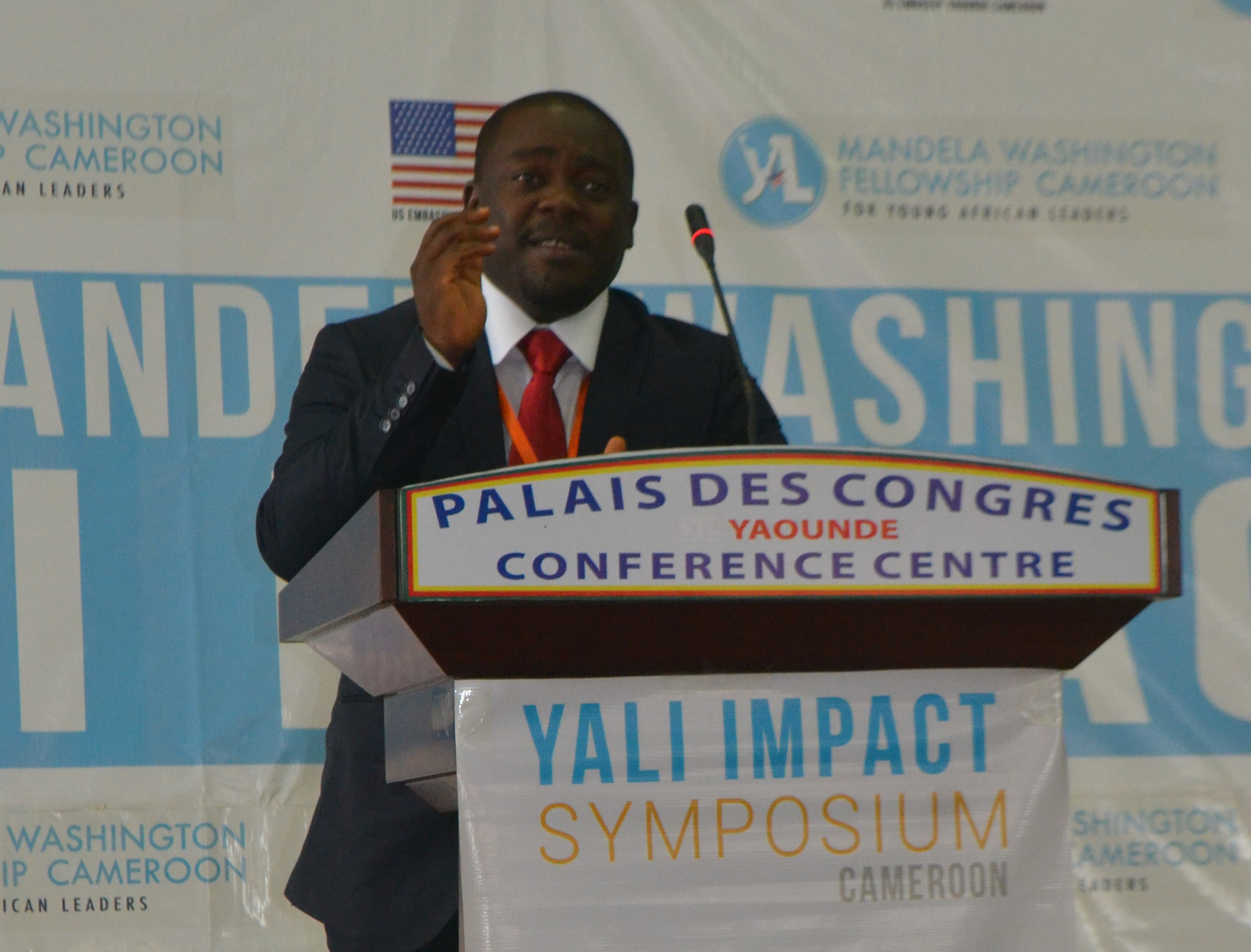
Bony Dashaco speaking at the YALI Impact Symposium in 2018

Dashaco is the president and founder of Médiafrique, an affiliate of ACMAR International. The media company is preset in 22 African countries and has created over 1000 direct jobs. He was nominated in the 2016 Ranking of 50 Most Influential Young Cameroonians by the Center for Entrepreneurship, Leadership and Business Management Development (CELBMD) Africa. In 2016, he was interviewed by France News Network Africa 24 with a special focus on Africa to highlight the development of media in Africa, and its problems and solutions.

In March 2016, the United States embassy in Cameroon visited the Acmar group in Douala and had an interview with the group president based on US foreign policy in Cameroon.

Dashaco was named one of Institut Choiseul for International Politics and Geoeconomics's list of 100 future economic leaders of Africa.

In 2021, he launched three TV channels Dash TV, Dash Info, and Dash Sports & entertainment.

== Personal life ==
Dashaco is married and has two children.

== See also ==
- Media of Cameroon
