= Giacomo Boni =

Giacomo Boni may refer to:

- Giacomo Boni (archaeologist) (1859–1925), Italian archeologist specialised in Roman architecture
- Giacomo Boni (painter) (1688–1766), Italian Baroque painter
