= Bonnie's =

- Interactive map of Bonnie's

Restaurant information
- Established: December 2021
- Location: 398 Manhattan Ave, Brooklyn, New York, United States
- Coordinates: 40°43′04″N 73°56′47″W

Bonnie's is a Cantonese-American restaurant in the Williamsburg neighborhood of Brooklyn, in New York City.

== History ==
Calvin Eng opened Bonnie's in December 2021. Eng previously worked at Win Son as chef de cuisine. Eng named the restaurant for his mother.

Before opening Bonnie, Eng served potential menu items at pop-ups around New York City. Eng was inspired by his mother's cooking and by the offerings of cha chaan tengs.

== Accolades ==
The Financial Times included Bonnie's on its April 2024 article detailing five of the "most exciting new-wave" Chinese eating establishments in New York City, alongside other restaurants including Figure Eight. The author of the article, Lilah Raptopoulos, praised the restaurant's ambience and highlighted dishes including the stuffed cabbage.
