= Bonny Brook =

- Location of the mouth of Bonny Brook Bonny Brook (the United States)

Location
- Country: United States
- State: New York

Physical characteristics
- Mouth: Mohawk River
  - location: Frankfort, New York
  - coordinates: 43°03′24″N 75°05′36″W
  - elevation: 383 ft (117 m)
- Basin size: 2.65 sq mi (6.9 km^{2})

The Bonny Brook flows into the Mohawk River in Frankfort, New York.
