= Bonny Ibhawoh =

Nigerian of history)

Bonny Ibhawoh is the Senator William McMaster Chair in Global Human Rights, Fellow of the Royal Society of Canada, Expert-Rapporteur, United Nations Expert Mechanism on the Right to Development, UN-OHCHR and Founding Director, Centre for Human Rights and Restorative Justice

== Education ==
Bonny Ibhawoh earned his MA in History from the University of Ibadan in Nigeria and a Ph.D. in History Dalhousie University Halifax, Canada. Ibhawoh was on the Killam Scholarship, one of the most prestigious scholarships given to doctoral students in Canada. His doctoral dissertation explored the tensions in imperial and anti-colonial discourses of human rights in Africa.

== Career ==
Bonny Ibhawoh began his academic career as a lecturer at Bendel State University, Nigeria (now, Ambrose Alli University). He has held faculty appointments at the University of Lagos and Covenant University in Nigeria, Brock University, Canada, and the University of North Carolina at Asheville. He was a Human Rights Fellow at the Carnegie Council for Ethics in International Affairs, New York, Research Fellow at the Danish Institute for Human Rights, Copenhagen and Associate Member of the Centre for African Studies, School of Oriental and African Studies (SOAS), University of London.

Bonny Ibhawoh is currently the Vice Provost (International Affairs) and professor of Global Human Rights and African Studies at McMaster University. He also teaches in the McMaster Arts & Science Program and the Institute on Globalization and the Human Condition. His scholarship includes studies in the history of human rights, the cultural relativism of human rights, the right to development and peace/conflict studies. He is also the author of several books on African History, Human Rights and Peace & Conflict studies including Imperialism and Human Rights , and Imperial Justice: Africans in Empire's Court, and Human Rights in Africa (Cambridge University Press). He is a contributor to the GIAZILO blog - a blog on "Human Rights, Social Justice and Peace."

Ibhawoh is a critic of absolute cultural relativism in the interpretation of human rights norms. He has argued that the cultural relativist stance has been dominated by urban-based elites whose perception of "cultural legitimacy" focuses on the idealized and invented traditions of collectivism, definitive gender roles, and conservative patriarchy in the interpretation of moral values. His book "Imperialism and Human Rights" has been described as "one of the first to explore the role rights performed during the process of decolonization of Africa."

== Honours ==
Ibhawoh is a recipient of the John Holland Award for Professional Achievement. Ibhawoh is a fellow of the Royal Society of Canada, and a United Nations Independent Expert on the Expert Mechanism on the Right to Development. He is also the recipient of the McMaster Student Union Teaching Award and the Nelson Mandela Distinguished Africanist Award.

Ibhawoh is also the Director of McMaster University’s Centre for Human Rights and Restorative Justice. He is the Project Director of the Confronting Atrocity Project, and Participedia, a global scholarly network on democratic innovation.

== Publications ==
Bonny Ibhawoh has published several books, academic journals and conference papers on global human rights, imperialism, peace and conflicts in top-tier publications.

His books include:

- Bonny Ibhawoh, Sylvia Bawa and Jasper Ayelazuno, eds., Truth Commissions and State Building (McGill-Queens University Press, 2023).
- M. Raymond Izarali, Oliver Masakure, Bonny Ibhawoh eds., Expanding Perspectives on Human Rights in Africa (New York: Routledge, 2019)
- Behnaz A. Mirzai and Bonny Ibhawoh eds. Africa and its Diasporas: Rethinking Struggles for Recognition and Empowerment (Trenton, NJ: Africa World Press, 2018)
- Human Rights in Africa (Cambridge: Cambridge University Press, 2018)
- Uyilawa Usuanlele and Bonny Ibhawoh eds., Minority Rights and the National Question in Nigeria, (New York: Palgrave Macmillan, 2017)
- Imperial Justice: Africans in Empire’s Court (Oxford: Oxford University Press, 2011)
- Imperialism and Human Rights: Colonial Discourses of Rights and Liberties in African History, (Albany, State University of New York Press, 2007) [Named American Library Association, Choice Outstanding Academic Title]
- Human Rights Organisations in Nigeria: An Appraisal Report on the Human Rights NGO community in Nigeria (Copenhagen: The Danish Centre for Human Rights).
- Between Culture and Constitution (Copenhagen, The Danish Institute for Human Rights, 1999).
- C O Okonkwo; Clement Nwankwo; Bonny Ibhawoh, Administration of juvenile justice in Nigeria, (Lagos: Constitutional Rights Project, 1997).
- Clement Nwankwo, Bonny Ibhawoh; Dulue Mbachu, The Failure of Prosecution: A Report on the Prosecution of Criminal Suspects in Nigeria (Lagos: Constitutional Rights Project, 1996).
