= 2017 Boulikessi attack =

- Part of Mali War
Date	March 5, 2017
Location	Boulikessi, Mali
Result	JNIM victory

Belligerents
Mali; Malian Army; Waraba Battalion	Jama'at Nasr al-Islam wal Muslimin

Commanders and leaders
Lt. Col. Abdoulaye Diallo †	Unknown

Casualties and losses
15 killed 5 injured 3 captured	2 wounded (per JNIM)

On March 5, 2017, jihadists from Jama'at Nasr al-Islam wal Muslimin attacked Malian forces in Boulikessi. The attack was the first by JNIM since its inception that month.

== Background ==
Jama'at Nasr al-Islam wal Muslimin was formed in March 2017 as a coalition of five jihadist groups that initially rebelled against the Malian government in 2012. These groups included Al-Qaeda in the Islamic Maghreb, Katiba Macina, Al-Mourabitoun, the Movement for Oneness and Jihad in West Africa, and Ansar Dine, whose leader Iyad Ag Ghaly also became leader of JNIM.

== Attack ==
The Waraba battalion of the Malian Army was attacked around 5am by three pickups in Boulikessi while on patrol on March 5. The soldiers fled the scene, some ending up in the village of Dambatousougou in Burkina Faso, and others in Mondoro. Much of the Malian Army's equipment and weapons were destroyed or captured by the jihadists. The commander of the Malian detachment, Lieutenant-Colonel Abdoulaye Diallo, was killed fending off the jihadists. Fighting lasted for four hours. Fighters from the pro-government Arab Movement of Azawad were present near the attack, but did not intervene.

The Malian government deployed reinforcements from the Waraba and Debo battalions, along with French forces, to search for the perpetrators.

== Aftermath ==
AFP claimed the attack was perpetrated by Ansarul Islam shortly after news broke, but JNIM claimed responsibility on March 9.

The Malian ministry of defense claimed the deaths of eleven soldiers and the injuries of five others. A resident of Boulikessi, speaking to Nord Sud Journal, claimed thirteen soldiers were killed. The UN reported in its March 2017 report that fifteen Malian soldiers were killed and five were injured. JNIM claimed only two of their fighters were wounded in the attack, and claimed to have killed a dozen Malian soldiers.

Three Malian soldiers taken captive during the attack appeared in JNIM propaganda videos in October 2017.
