= Mondoro =

- Commune and village
- Location in Mali
- Coordinates: 14°40′34″N 1°57′4″W
- Country: Mali
- Region: Mopti Region
- Cercle: Douentza Cercle

Area
  - Total: 5,598 km^{2} (2,161 sq mi)

Population (2009 census)
  - Total: 42,631
  - Density: 7.615/km^{2} (19.72/sq mi)
- Time zone: UTC+0 (GMT)

Mondoro (Mɔ̀ndɔ́:rɔ́) is a village and rural commune in the Cercle of Douentza in the Mopti Region of Mali, near the border of Burkina Faso. The commune contains 22 villages and had a population of 42,631 in the 2009 census. The commune is the largest by area and population in the Douentza Cercle.

Mondoro village has tanners (Morba clan), dyers, and blacksmiths. Most villagers have the surnames Ongoiba and Morba. A few are also surnamed Goro and Sanga. Jamsay Dogon is spoken in the village. There is a weekly Monday market.

On March 4, 2022, rebels entered the village and attacked an army base with car bombs, killing 27 soldiers and injuring over 33 others. The government declared a three-day national day of mourning in response.
