= Douentza =

- Urban Commune and town
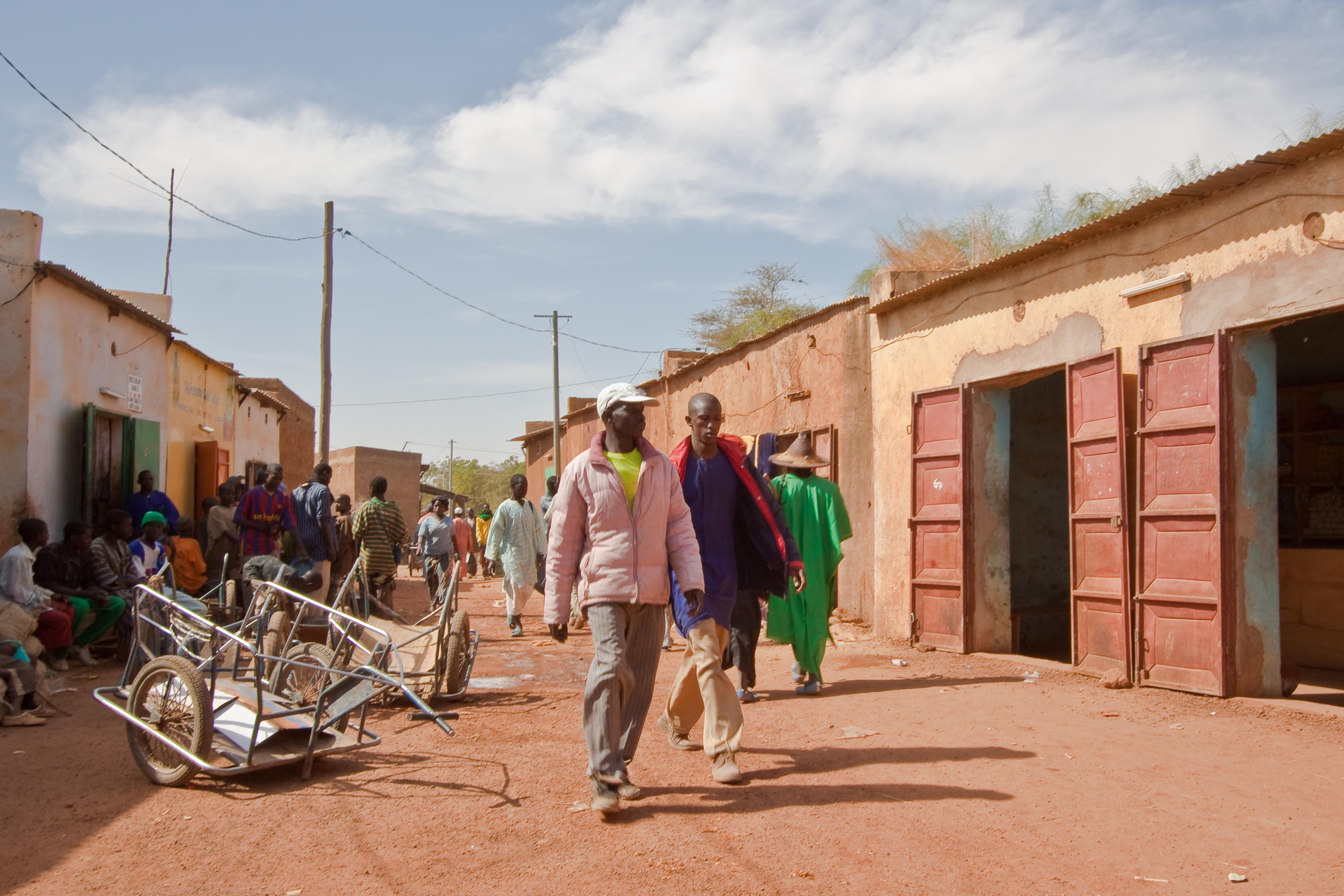

- Location in Mali
- Coordinates: 15°0′N 2°57′W
- Country: Mali
- Region: Mopti Region
- Cercle: Douentza Cercle

Area
  - Total: 154 km^{2} (59 sq mi)
- Elevation: 305 m (1,001 ft)

Population (2009 census)
  - Total: 28,005
  - Density: 182/km^{2} (471/sq mi)
- Time zone: UTC+0 (Greenwich Mean Time)

Douentza (Fulfulde: Duwayⁿsa) is a town and urban commune in the Mopti Region of central Mali. The town lies 145 km east-northeast of Mopti on the RN16, a paved road that links Mopti and Gao. It is the administrative center of the Douentza Cercle.

The town's old quarter is mostly Fulfulde-speaking. Newer sections of the town near the highway are mostly Bambara-speaking.

== History ==
The area around Douentza was densely populated and the site of industrial-scale iron during the height of the Wagadou Empire between approximately 700 and 1200 CE.

Douentza is the leading town in the historic region of Haayre (or Hayre), a Fulbe-led kingdom dating to the 19th century. Its name ("Haayre" meaning "rocky place") describes the rocky outcrops which dominate many areas near Douentza, and have provided defense for the locals against raiders and invaders throughout their history. From at least the 17th century CE, villages in the area were fought over by Tuareg and Fulbe groups before the rise of the centralized Fulbe Massina Empire and its later conquest by the Fulbe and Toucouleur forces of El Hadj Umar Tall. The French moved into the area in the last decade of the 19th century, in part assimilating the previous political entities as elements of so-called strategy of Indirect rule. Douentza remains a largely Fulbe town and region, but populations of Touareg, former Touareg slaves (the "Bella"), Bambara, and other ethnicities live in the local towns and villages. In Douentza town in particular, large portions of Fulbe population" .

On 5 April 2012, it was captured by the Tuareg rebels of the National Movement for the Liberation of Azawad (MNLA). Describing the town as the "frontier" of their new nation, the MNLA declared an end to their offensive. The following day, the group officially declared the independence of Azawad from Mali.

On 1 September 2012, the Islamist group Movement for Oneness and Jihad in West Africa took over Douentza, which had previously been held by a Songhai secular militia, the Ganda Iso (Songhai for "Sons of the Land"). A MOJWA spokesman said that the group had had an agreement with the Ganda Iso, but had decided to occupy the town when the militia appeared to be acting independently. Once MOJWA troops surrounded the city, the militia reportedly surrendered without a fight and were disarmed.

On 15 January 2013, the Douentza high school was bombed by the French Air Force. This operation was coupled with other air strikes and ground forces.

Twenty United Nations′ peace keepers were wounded in attacks by rebels on 10 February 2021.

== Transport ==
The town is served by Douentza Airport.
