= Boni, Mali =

Boni
- Village
- Location in Mali
- Coordinates: 15°04′30″N 2°13′16″W
- Country: Mali
- Region: Mopti Region
- Cercle: Douentza Cercle
- Commune: Hairé
- Time zone: UTC+0 (GMT)

Boni (Fulfulde: Booni) is a village and seat of the commune of Hairé in the Cercle of Douentza in the Mopti Region of southern-central Mali. The village is 5 km south of the main road, the RN15, that links Mopti and Gao. This is the only paved road in this part of Mali.

Boni is primarily made up of Fulbe. There is a weekly Thursday market.
