= Douentza Cercle =

- Cercle
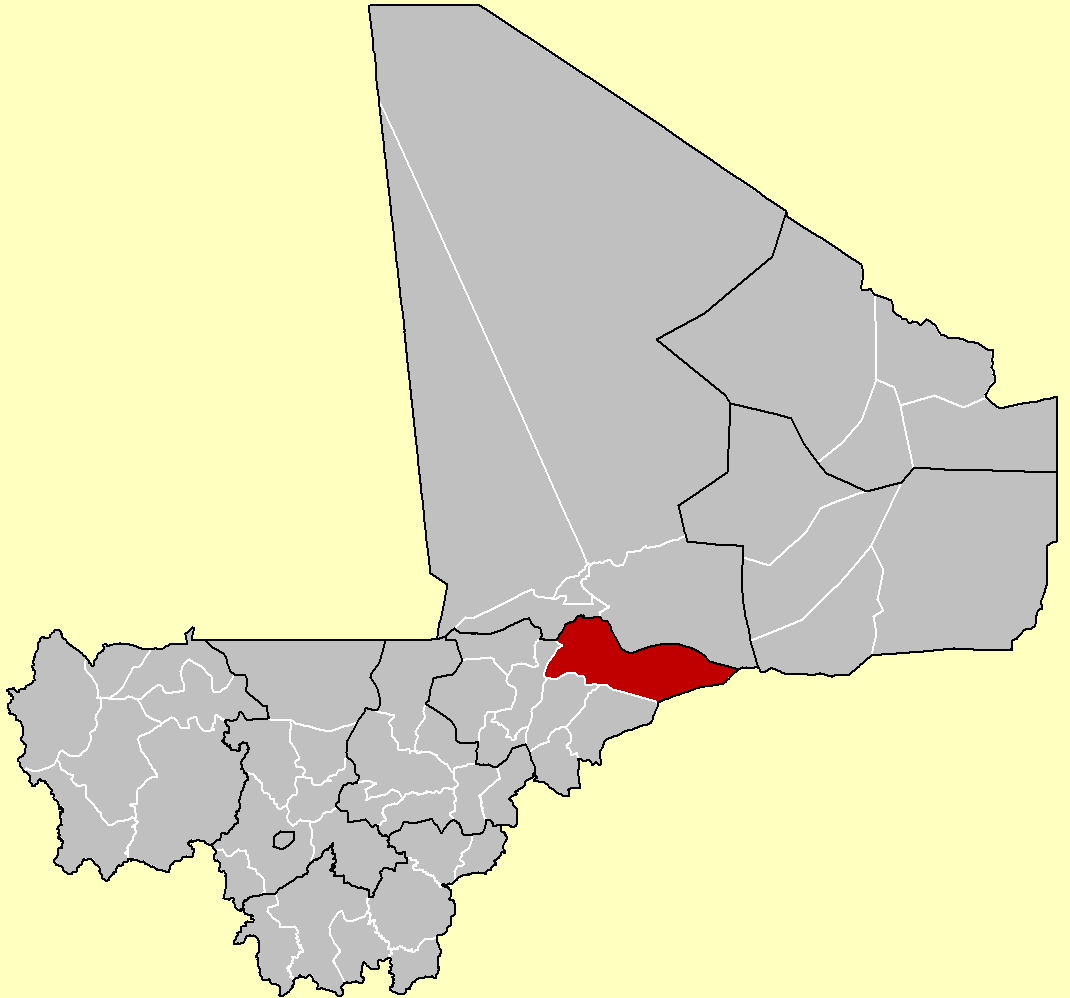
- Location of the Cercle of Douentza in Mali

- Location within Mali
- Coordinates: 15°05′N 2°40′W
- Country: Mali
- Region: Mopti Region
- Admin HQ (chef-lieu): Douentza

Area
  - Total: 23,481 km^{2} (9,066 sq mi)

Population (2009 census)
  - Total: 247,794
  - Density: 10.553/km^{2} (27.332/sq mi)
- Time zone: UTC+0 (GMT)

Douentza Cercle is an administrative subdivision of the Mopti Region of Mali. The administrative center (chef-lieu) is the town of Douentza.

During the Tuareg rebellion of 2012, it was the southernmost part of the state of Azawad, according to the April 2012 MNLA's territorial claim. From June 2012, it was claimed by a series of rival Islamist and local militias.

The route of the annual circular migration of the Gourma elephants crosses a number of communes in the cercles of Douentza and Gourma-Rharous (Tombouctou Region).

The cercle is divided into 15 communes:

- Dallah
- Dangol Boré
- Débéré
- Dianwéli
- Djaptodji
- Douentza
- Gandamia
- Haïré
- Hombori
- Kéréna
- Korarou
- Koubéwel Koundia
- Mondoro
- Pétaka
- Tédjé
