= Iroquois Theatre fire =

1903 building fire in Chicago, Illinois

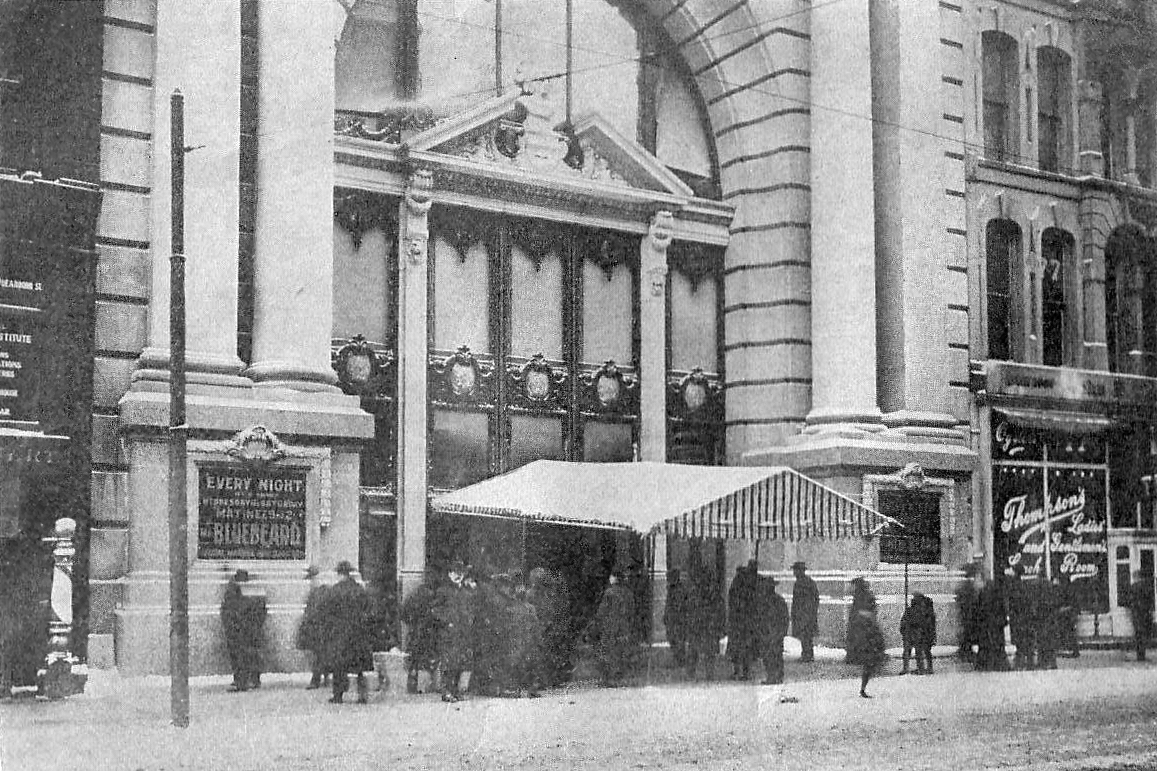
- The Iroquois Theatre, shortly before the fire
- Location of the Iroquois Theatre
- Date: December 30, 1903; 122 years ago
- Time: About 3:15 p.m.
- Location: Chicago, Illinois, U.S.; 41°53′5″N 87°37′43″W
- Cause: Ignition of muslin curtains due to broken arc light
- Deaths: 602
- Injuries: 250

The Iroquois Theatre fire took place on December 30, 1903, at the Iroquois Theatre in Chicago, Illinois. The building fire, which occurred during a performance attended by 1,700 people, caused 602 deaths and 250 non-fatal injuries. It ranks as the worst theater fire in the United States, surpassing the carnage of the Brooklyn Theatre fire of 1876, which claimed at least 278 lives. For nearly a century, the Iroquois Theatre fire was the deadliest single-building disaster in American history. Only the destruction of the World Trade Center on September 11, 2001, has claimed more lives among United States disasters impacting a single building or complex.

Despite being billed as "absolutely fireproof", the Iroquois Theatre, which opened a month before the fire, exhibited numerous deficiencies in fire readiness that contributed to the high death toll. Some of these deficiencies were known by city officials tasked with public safety. The resulting scandal resulted in changes in building safety codes and code enforcement in the United States and throughout the world.

The fire broke out at about 3:15 p.m. while the Iroquois presented a matinee performance of the musical Mr. Blue Beard starring Eddie Foy. A broken arc lamp ignited some muslin curtains, which stage managers were unable to douse. Stagehands tried to lower the safety curtain to contain the fire, but the curtain jammed part way down. Despite attempts by Foy to calm the crowd, audience members frantically rushed for the exits, only to find that fire exits were locked or hidden. The largest death toll was at the base of stairways, where hundreds of people were trampled, crushed or asphyxiated; some people jumped to their deaths from the fire escapes. The Iroquois had no fire-alarm box or telephone, which hampered initial rescue efforts. It is estimated that 575 people were killed on the day of the fire, with dozens dying afterward; the vast majority of those killed were audience members.

Two features, the safety curtain and fire dampers, were either not present or not working at the time of the fire. Other contributing factors included a lack of exit signs, emergency lighting, or fire preparedness; doors that opened inward or were locked shut; confusing exit routes; icy or improperly installed fire escapes; and the presence of ornamental doors. The Iroquois Memorial Hospital was built as a memorial to the fire, and Chicago held an annual memorial service. The Iroquois fire prompted widespread implementation of the panic bar, asbestos fire curtains, and doors that open outward. The theater was rebuilt and operated until 1925, when it was replaced by the Oriental Theatre.

== Theater ==
The Iroquois Theatre was located at 26 West Randolph Street, between State Street and Dearborn Street. The syndicate that bankrolled its construction chose the location specifically to attract women visiting the city on day trips who would be more comfortable attending a theater near the police-patrolled Loop shopping district. The theater opened on November 23, 1903, after numerous delays resulting from labor unrest and, according to one writer, the unexplained inability of architect Benjamin Marshall to complete required drawings on time. Upon opening, the theater was lauded by drama critics; Walter K. Hill wrote in the New York Clipper (a predecessor of Variety) that the Iroquois was "the most beautiful ... in Chicago, and competent judges state that few theaters in America can rival its architectural perfections ..."

The Iroquois had a capacity of 1,602 with three audience levels. The main floor, known as the orchestra or parquet, had approximately 700 seats on the same level as the foyer and Grand Stair Hall. The second level, the dress circle or (first) balcony, had more than 400 seats. The third level, the gallery, had about 500 seats. There were four boxes on the first level and two on the level above.

The theater had only one entrance. A broad stairway that led from the foyer to the balcony level was also used to reach the stairs to the gallery level. Theater designers claimed that this allowed patrons to "see and be seen" regardless of the price of their seats. However, the common stairway ignored Chicago fire ordinances that required separate stairways and exits for each balcony. The design proved disastrous: people exiting the gallery encountered a crowd leaving the balcony level, and people descending from the upper levels met the orchestra-level patrons in the foyer. The backstage areas were unusually large. Dressing rooms were on five levels, and an elevator was available to transport actors down to the stage level. The fly gallery (where scenery was hung) was also uncommonly large.

After the fire, the Iroquois Theatre was renamed and reopened as the Hyde & Behman's Music Hall in September 1904. In October 1905, it was rechristened as the Colonial Theatre. It remained active until the building was demolished in 1925. In 1926, the Oriental Theatre was built on the site. In 2019, the Oriental Theatre was renamed the Nederlander Theatre.

=== Fire readiness deficiencies noted before the fire ===
Despite being billed as "absolutely fireproof" in advertisements and playbills, numerous deficiencies in fire readiness were apparent in the theater building. An editor of Fireproof Magazine toured the Iroquois during construction and noted "the absence of an intake, or stage draft shaft; the exposed reinforcement of the (proscenium) arch; the presence of wood trim on everything and the inadequate provision of exits."

Chicago Fire Department (CFD) captain Patrick Jennings performed an unofficial tour of the theater days before the official opening and noted that there were no sprinklers, alarms, telephones or water connections. The captain and the theater's fireman William Sallers discussed the deficiencies. Sallers did not report the matter directly to fire chief William Musham, concerned that he would be dismissed by the syndicate that owned the theater. When Captain Jennings reported the matter to his commanding officer, battalion chief John J. Hannon, he was told that nothing could be done as the theater already had a fireman.

The onsite firefighting equipment consisted of six Kilfyre fire extinguishers. The New York Tribune noted that the theater had no automatic sprinkler system despite it being required by law, and that the theater management was shown to have violated building laws. Kilfyre was a form of dry chemical extinguisher also sold for dousing chimney fires in residential houses. It consisted of a 2 in × 24 in (5.1 cm × 61.0 cm) tube of tin filled with about 3 pounds (1.4 kg) of white powder, mostly sodium bicarbonate. The user was instructed to "forcibly hurl" the contents of the tube at the base of the flames. The fire began high above the stage, so the Kilfyre, when thrown, fell uselessly to the ground.

== Fire ==
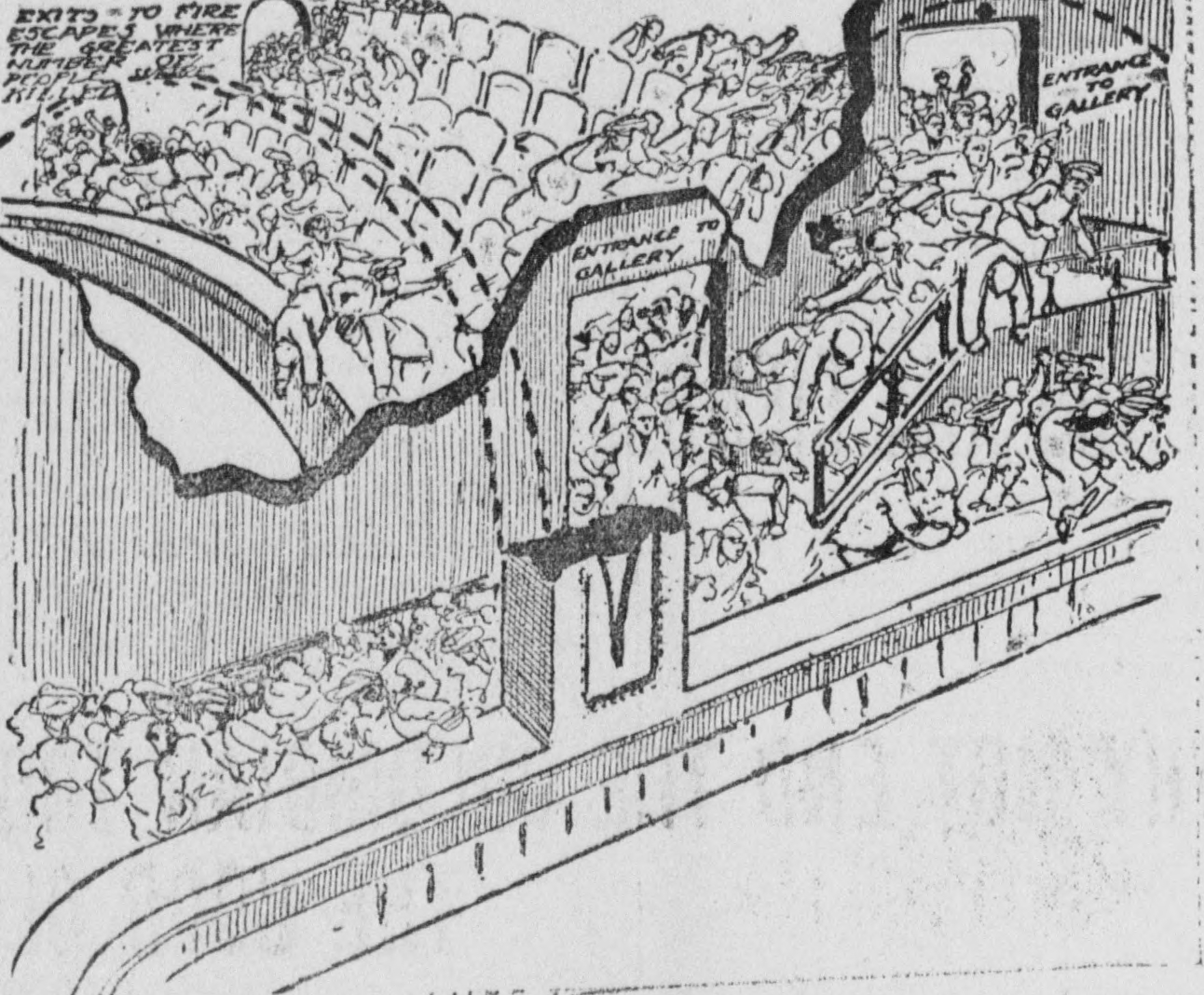
Panicked theatergoers trying to flee (artist's conception)

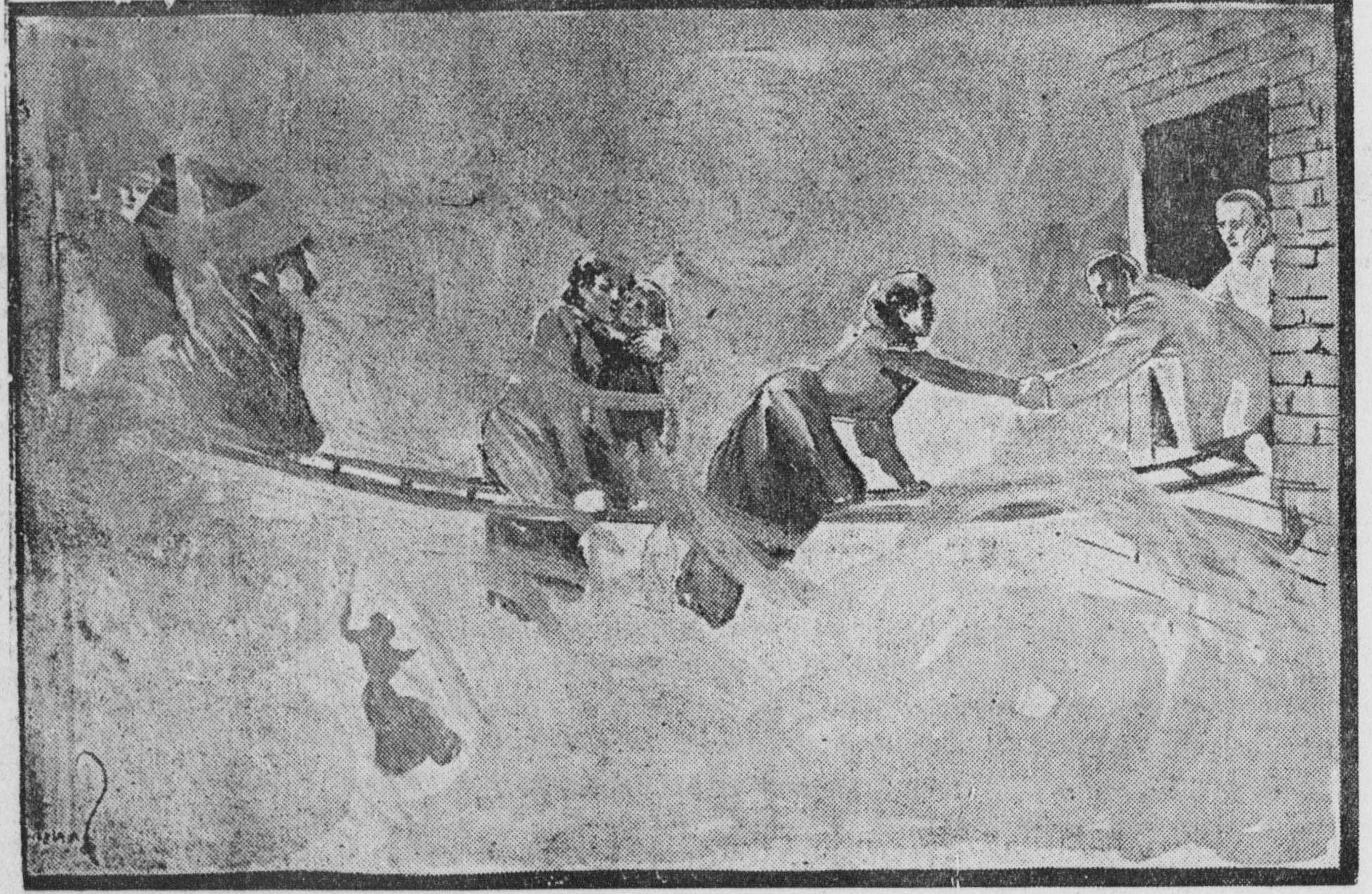
Theatergoers climbing along ladders above the alley (artist's conception)

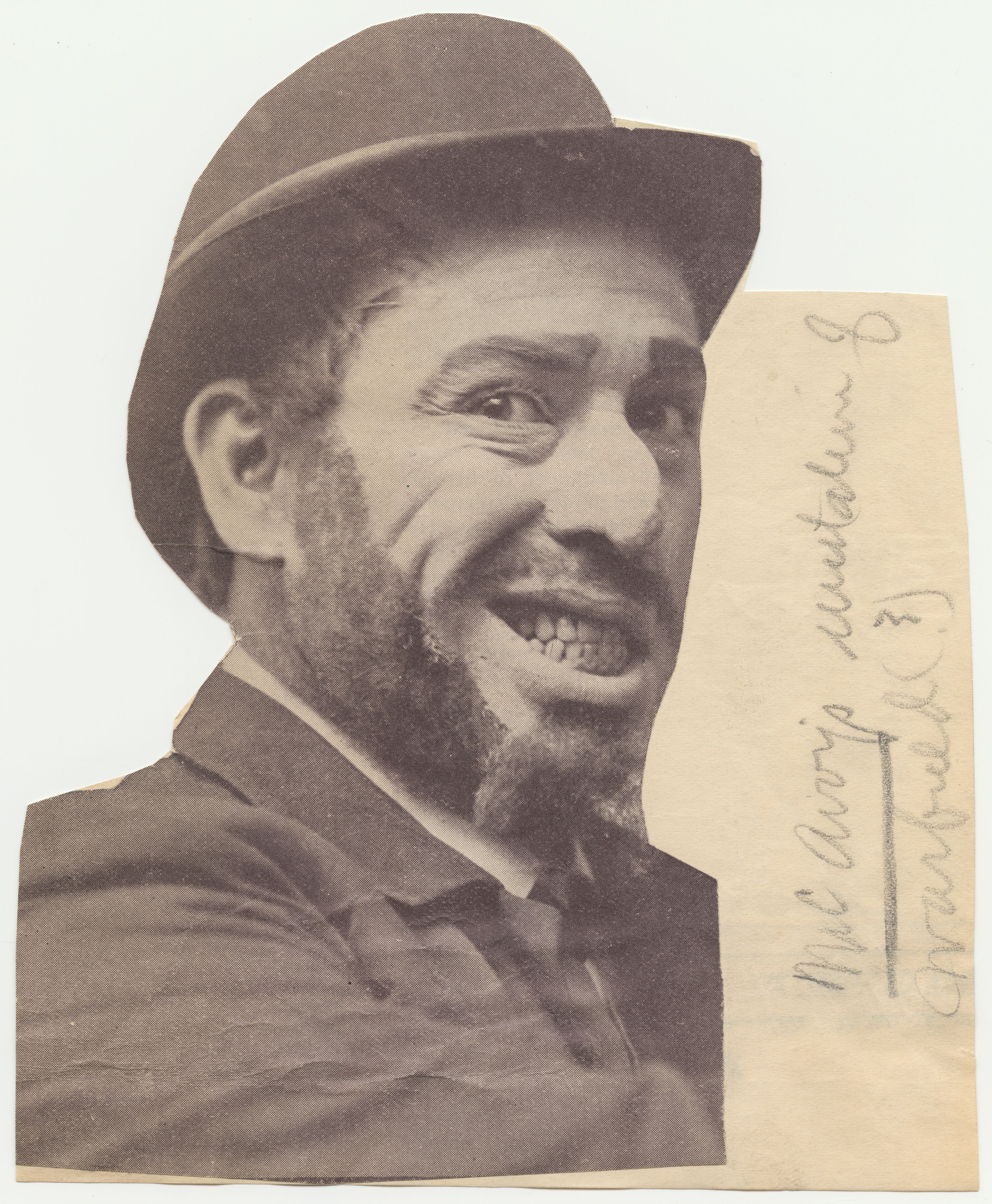
Dan McAvoy, the actor who played Mr. Blue Beard

On Wednesday, December 30, 1903, the Iroquois presented a matinee performance of the popular Drury Lane musical Mr. Blue Beard, which had been playing at the theater since opening night. The play, a burlesque of the traditional "Bluebeard" folk tale, featured Dan McAvoy as Bluebeard and Eddie Foy as Sister Anne, a role that showcased his physical-comedy skills. Dancer Bonnie Maginn was also in the cast as Imer Dasher. Attendance since opening night had been disappointing as the result of poor weather, labor unrest and other factors. The December 30 performance drew a much larger sellout audience. Tickets were sold for every seat in the house, plus hundreds more for the standing-room areas at the back of the theater. Many of the estimated 2,100–2,200 patrons attending the matinee were children. The standing-room areas were so crowded that some patrons sat in the aisles, blocking the exits.

At about 3:15 p.m., shortly after the beginning of the second act, eight men and eight women were performing the double-octet musical number "In the Pale Moonlight", with the stage illuminated by blue-tinted spotlights to suggest a night scene. Sparks from an arc light ignited a muslin curtain, possibly as the result of an electrical short circuit. Lamp operator William McMullen testified that the lamp was placed too close to the curtain but that stage managers had failed to offer a solution when he had first reported the problem. McMullen clapped at the fire when it started, but the flame quickly raced up the curtain and beyond his reach. Theater fireman William Sallers tried to douse the fire with the Kilfyre canisters, but by that time it had spread to the fly gallery high above the stage where several thousand square feet of highly flammable painted canvas scenery flats were hung. The stage manager tried to lower the asbestos fire curtain, but it snagged. Early reports stated that the asbestos curtain was stopped by the trolley wire that carried acrobats over the stage, but later investigation showed that the curtain had been blocked by a light reflector that protruded from under the proscenium arch. A chemist who later tested part of the curtain stated that it was composed mainly of wood pulp mixed with asbestos and would have been "of no value in a fire."

Foy, who had been preparing to take the stage, attempted to calm the crowd from the stage, first ensuring that his young son was in the care of a stagehand. He later wrote, "It struck me as I looked out over the crowd during the first act that I had never before seen so many women and children in the audience. Even the gallery was full of mothers and children." Foy was widely considered a hero after the fire for his courage in remaining on stage and pleading with patrons not to panic even as large chunks of burning scenery landed around him.

By this time, many of the patrons on all levels were attempting to flee the theater. Some had found the fire exits hidden behind draperies on the north side of the building but discovered that they could not open the unfamiliar bascule locks. Bar owner Frank Houseman, a former baseball player with the Chicago Colts, defied an usher who refused to open a door. He was able to open the door because his ice box at home had a similar lock. Houseman credited his friend, outfielder Charlie Dexter, who had just quit the Boston Beaneaters, with forcing open another door. A third door was opened either by brute force or by a blast of air, but most of the other doors could not be opened. Some patrons panicked, crushing or trampling others in a desperate attempt to escape. Many were killed while trapped in dead ends or while trying to open windows that appeared to be doors.

The dancers on stage were also forced to flee, along with the performers backstage and in the numerous dressing rooms. Several performers and stagehands escaped through the building's main rear exit, which consisted of a large set of stock double doors normally used for moving large fly sceneries and set pieces or props into the backstage area. When the door was opened, an icy wind blast rushed inside, fueling the flames with air and causing the fire to grow substantially larger.

Many performers escaped through the coal hatch and through windows in the dressing rooms, and others tried to escape via the west stage door, which opened inward and became jammed as actors frantically pressed toward the door. A passing railroad agent saw the crowd pressing against the door and unfastened the hinges from the outside, allowing the actors and stagehands to escape. As the vents above the stage were nailed or wired shut, the fireball instead traveled outward, ducking under the stuck asbestos curtain and streaking toward the vents behind the dress circle and gallery 50 feet (15 m) away. The hot gases and flames passed over the heads of those in the orchestra seats and incinerated flammable materials in the gallery and dress circle levels, including patrons still trapped in those areas.

Those in the orchestra section exited into the foyer and out of the front door, but those in the dress circle and gallery who escaped the fireball could not reach the foyer because stairwells were blocked by high layers of fallen victims. Although iron grates that blocked secondary stairways during performances (to prevent patrons in the cheaper seats from sneaking downstairs to the more expensive lower levels) were still in place, first responders found very few victims near the gates. The largest death toll was at the base of stairways, where hundreds of people were trampled, crushed or asphyxiated. People who were able to escape using the emergency exits on the north side found themselves on fire escapes, one of which was improperly installed, causing people to trip upon exiting the fire-escape door. Many jumped or fell from the icy, narrow fire escapes to their deaths, and the bodies of the first jumpers broke the falls of those who followed them. Students from the Northwestern University building north of the theater tried bridging the gap with a ladder and then with some boards between the rooftops, saving those few able to manage the makeshift crossover.

The Iroquois had no fire-alarm box or telephone. The CFD's Engine 13 was alerted to the fire by a stagehand who had been ordered to run from the burning theater to the nearest firehouse. On the way to the scene, at approximately 3:33 p.m., a member of Engine 13 activated an alarm box to call additional units. Initial efforts focused on the people trapped on the fire escapes. The alley to the north of the theater, known as Couch Place, was icy, narrow and full of smoke. Aerial ladders could not be used in the alley and black nets, concealed by the smoke, proved useless.

The Chicago Police Department became involved when an officer patrolling the theater district saw people emerge from the building in a panic, some with clothing on fire. The officer reported the incident from a police box on Randolph Street, and police, summoned by whistles, soon converged on the scene to control traffic and aid with the evacuation. Some of the city's 30 uniformed police matrons were summoned because of the large number of female casualties.

== Victims ==
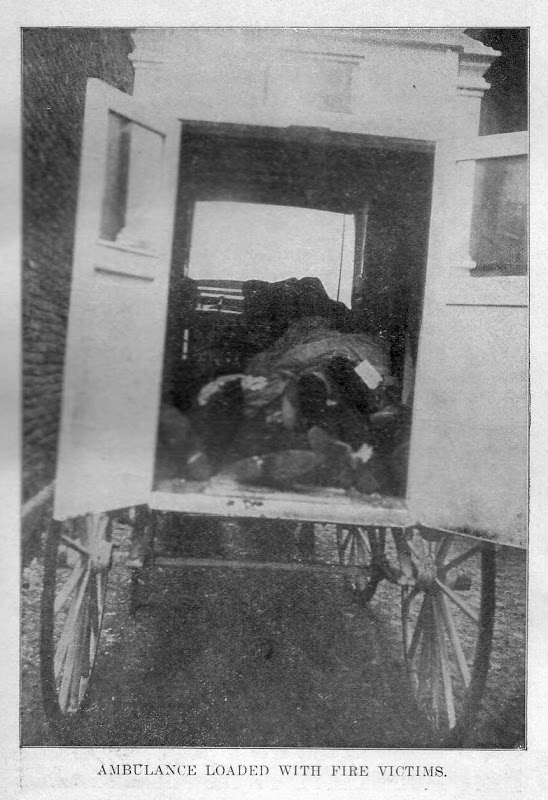
A horse-drawn ambulance is filled with the bodies of victims.

Mass panic ensued amid the fire and many of those trapped inside tried climbing over piles of bodies in order to escape. Corpses were stacked ten feet high around some of the blocked exits. The victims were asphyxiated by the fire, smoke and gases or were crushed by the onrush of others behind them. It is estimated that 575 people were killed on the day of the fire, and at least 30 more died of injuries over the following weeks. Many of the dead were buried in Montrose, Calvary, Saint Boniface, Mount Greenwood, Mount Hope, Mount Olivet, Oak Woods, Rosehill, Graceland, Forest Home and Waldheim Jewish cemeteries.

Of the approximately 300 actors, dancers and stagehands, only five people died: aerialist Nellie Reed, an actor in a bit part, an usher and two female attendants. Reed's role was to fly as a fairy over the audience on a trolley wire, showering them with pink carnations. She was trapped above the stage while waiting for her entrance and fell during the fire. She died from burns and internal injuries three days later.

William Etten, a well-known Chicago reporter, described the scene of devastation he witnessed during the firemen and policemen's efforts to recover the dead and dying:

The dead lay literally in heaps, frail women gasped for the last time from mounds of corpses, puny children sighed their lives away, while an eager morbid crowd pressed forward to look on the face of death. It was more horrible than war, more terrifying than pestilence.

== Additional factors reducing survivability ==
=== Protecting the audience from hazards onstage ===
Two features, a safety curtain that confines fire to the stage area and smoke doors that allow smoke and heat to escape through the roof above the stage, combine to increase fire safety in theaters. This arrangement creates negative pressure; the stage area becomes a chimney, and fresh, breathable air is sucked through the exit doors into the audience area. At the Iroquois, the smoke doors above the stage were fastened closed. This meant that smoke flowed out of the building through many of the same exits through which people were trying to escape.

- Skylights on the roof of the stage, which were intended to open automatically during a fire and allow smoke and heat to escape, were fastened closed.
- The curtain was not tested periodically, and it became stuck when the theater personnel tried to lower it.
- The curtain was not fireproof. Curtains made with asbestos interwoven with wire create a strong and effective barrier against fire. The asbestos curtain at the Iroquois not only failed to lower but also proved to be both weak and flammable. Chemist Gustave J. Johnson of the Western Society of Engineers analyzed a piece of the material after the fire: "[It] was largely wood pulp. By mixing pulp with asbestos fiber, the life of the curtain is prolonged, the cost is cheapened, and the wire foundation may be dispensed with... It results in a curtain that may get inside city ordinances, but is of no value in a fire." Curtain material was rendered irrelevant by the 500-square-foot (46 m^{2}) triangular gap beneath the partly jammed curtain that functioned as a flue for the back-drafted fireball that hurled into the auditorium at 3:50 p.m. Eyewitnesses testified that the curtain was still in place when the fireball passed through the gap.

=== Emergency evacuation ===
The owners of the theater claimed that the 30 exits would allow everyone inside to escape the building within five minutes. Audiences in 1903 were aware of the hazards of fires in theaters, especially after at least 384 people died in the Ringtheater fire in Vienna, Austria.

- Some exit doors opened inward into the auditorium and others employed a bascule-type European latch unfamiliar to many people that prevented the door from opening when the crowd pressed against it. When people were able to pull the doors open enough to escape, some people were then wedged in the door opening as people continued to push on the door. Today, exit doors open outward, so that people trying to escape will tend to hold the doors open.
- There were no exit signs on fire-escape exits, and doors were concealed behind drapery. On the ground floor, the drapery was intact after the fire, but in the balconies, drapery was destroyed by the fireball.
- Theater staff had never experienced a fire drill. Contemporary press reports noted that although the theater had 25 exits, fewer than half a dozen were in working order at the time of the fire, and that ushers neglected the audience to save themselves. They were unfamiliar with the exits and some refused to open locked exit doors.
- The theater had no emergency lighting, and auditorium lights had been dimmed for the moonlight act on the stage at the time when the fire erupted. The electric switch box, located directly between the initiation point of the fire, was soon destroyed, darkening the entire auditorium, with the only illumination coming from the flames on the stage.
- During performances, some lesser-trafficked stairways were blocked with iron gates to prevent people with inexpensive tickets from taking seats in other parts of the theater. On the day of the fire, there were no empty seats. Had such gates been located at primary stairways, the death toll would have been higher; first responders reported that few victims were found at the iron gates.
- Many of the exit routes were confusing.
- There were several ornamental "doors" that looked like exits but were not. 200 people, roughly a third of the total fatalities, died in one passageway that was not an exit.
- Iron fire escapes on the north wall led to at least 125 deaths. People were trapped on all levels because the icy, narrow stairs and ladders were dangerous and because smoke and flames blocked the way down. The stairs on one fire-escape exit from the second-floor gallery had not been adjusted to accommodate a last-minute engineering alteration during construction that raised the level of the gallery floor inside the auditorium. As a result, the fire-escape landing was two feet (0.6 m) lower than the theater floor, causing people to stumble and fall onto the landing.

== Reactions ==
=== Domestic ===
Chicago's mayor, Carter Harrison IV, was sent official messages of sympathy from various American politicians, including:

- Theodore Roosevelt, President of the United States
- Richard Yates Jr., Governor of Illinois
- Albert B. Cummins, Governor of Iowa
- Seth Low, Mayor of New York City
- Patrick Collins, mayor of Boston

=== International ===
Official messages of sympathy were sent from various foreign government officials. Some were received by Harrison and by Acting United States Secretary of State Francis B. Loomis, while others were conveyed through the press. Among those who sent messages were:

- Hermann Speck von Sternburg, Ambassador from the German Empire to the United States
- Arthur Cassini, Ambassador from the Russian Empire to the United States
- Prince Henry of Prussia (German Empire)
- Sir James T. Ritchie, Lord Mayor of London (United Kingdom, British Empire)
- Robert Collier, 2nd Baron Monkswell, Chairman of the London County Council (United Kingdom, British Empire)
- Karl Lueger, mayor of Vienna (Austria-Hungary)

== Survivor accounts ==
Mrs. T. W. Talliferro of Dallas, Texas, who had attended the matinee with a lady companion and was seated in the third row from the rear of the parquet, described the moment the flames flashed from the stage across the audience: she started for the main doorway but found it already choked with crushed human forms. "Half dazed, almost suffocated," she fought her way out of the playhouse by means she could not afterward remember. Upon reaching the street she found her companion missing and began searching for her. Her husband, who had not attended the theater, rushed to the scene on hearing of the fire and spent hours searching the crowds blocking the streets, the injured in various hospitals, and the bodies placed on wagons, before going to the morgues to survey the charred remains. His search was interrupted when a voice from among those bending over the row of bodies said "Dear." He turned to find his wife in his arms. Her companion was later found to be safe.

Mrs. W. A. Warren, née Louise Bird of Chicago, was chaperoning three young girls from the third row from the front of the first floor when the fire broke out. Writing to her mother in Madison, Wisconsin, she described "the awful flames and smoke right on us and the people burning and jumping from the fire escapes and being carried away bleeding and screaming." The last of her group to get out, she picked up a small boy she feared would be crushed to death and carried him out, falling as people jumped over them, until they reached the street and she became separated from him. She then searched frantically for her three charges, finding them at a nearby Fields department store—their outer clothing lost, one girl's hair on fire when Warren reached her, with clerks extinguishing it. Their clothes had been nearly torn off in the effort to escape. "I am black and blue all over and my hat a trifle singed," Warren wrote, "but otherwise I am safe and how thankful we all are that none of us were really hurt."

== Aftermath ==
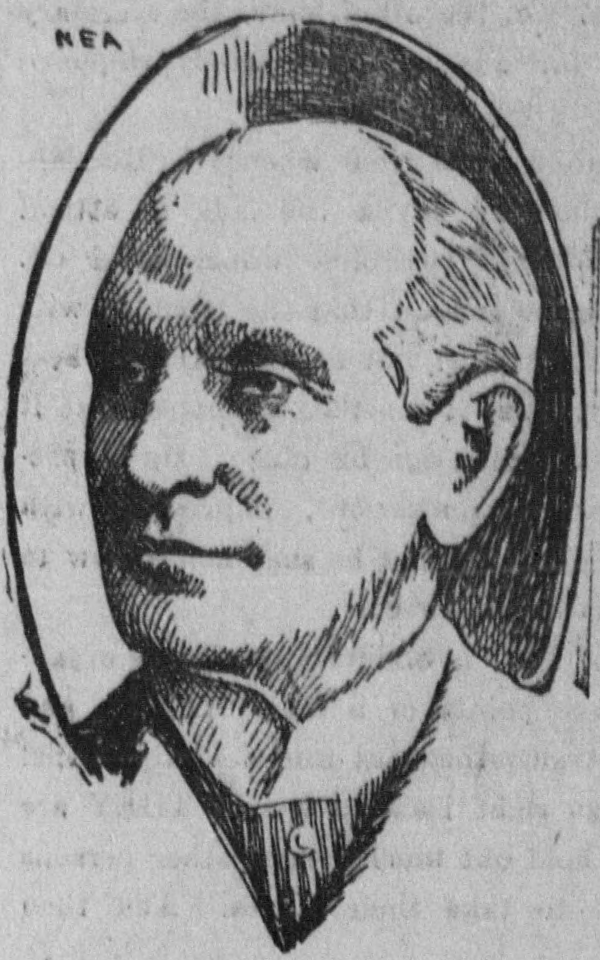
Theater manager Will Davis was arrested in January 1904 and charged with criminal neglect, but was acquitted.

In New York on New Year's Eve, some theaters eliminated standing room. Building and fire codes were subsequently reformed; theaters were closed for retrofitting all around the country and in some cities in Europe. All theater exits were required to be clearly marked and the doors configured so that, even if they could not be pulled open from the outside, they could be pushed open from the inside.

On the night of December 31, twelve theater employees were arrested on charges of accessory to manslaughter on orders from Chief of Police O'Neil, including stage manager William Carleton and stage carpenter Edward Cummings; four of the arrested men admitted they had been advised by theater management to leave Chicago and had packed their trunks before police intervened. Assistant stage manager William Plunkett was charged with manslaughter. Coroner Tregear ordered the arrests after discovering that a placard had been placed at the company's hotel ordering all members to leave Chicago on short notice—a move Tregear believed was intended to prevent witnesses from testifying before the coroner's jury.

On the evening of January 1, Will J. Davis and Harry Powers, leesees and managers of the Iroquois, and Building Commissioner George Williams were arrested and charged with manslaughter.

After the fire, it was alleged that fire inspectors had been bribed with free tickets to overlook code violations. Chicago mayor Carter Harrison IV ordered all theaters in Chicago closed for six weeks after the fire. As a result of public outrage, many were charged with crimes, including Harrison. Most charges were dismissed three years later because of the delaying tactics of the syndicate's lawyers and their use of loopholes and inadequacies in the city's building and safety ordinances. Levy Mayer was the attorney for the theater and its manager was Will J. Davis.

The exterior of the Iroquois was intact and the theater reopened nine months later as Hyde & Behman's Music Hall. The building later reopened as the Colonial Theater, which was demolished in 1925 to make way for the Oriental Theatre, which was later renamed the Nederlander Theatre in 2019.

== Press coverage ==
Newspaperman Walter Howey was working for the Chicago Inter Ocean newspaper as a reporter when he made his reputation by scooping competitors in reporting the Iroquois Theatre Fire.

Walking the streets of Chicago near the theater, Howey was startled to see a knight and three elves climb out of a manhole. He had stumbled upon four Mr. Blue Beard actors fleeing the conflagration. As more people escaped via the theater cellar through the sewers, Howey reported his scoop; the story, one of the biggest in Chicago's history, established his reputation for speed, resourcefulness, and skillful writing. Howey moved to William Randolph Hearst's Chicago American and went on to become a managing editor of several newspapers in the Hearst chain. He was later immortalized as the scheming, ruthless managing editor Walter Burns in Ben Hecht and Charles MacArthur's play The Front Page.

Chicago Tribune assistant city editor Edgar Sisson situated himself at Dyche's Drug Store on Randolph and State near the Iroquois Theatre, directing dozens of Tribune reporters, some of whom removed bodies from the theater. Tribune reporter E.O. Phillips lost three nieces to the fire.

The Tribune printed an eight-page special edition that hit newsstands on the morning of December 31, 1903. The entire front page consisted of lists of the dead and missing. Twenty Tribune employees had been assigned the job of obtaining photographs of the victims, and the issue of the following day (New Year's Day 1904) featured a great deal more victim photos than any other Chicago newspaper.

The Tribune created a panel to investigate the causes of the fire, publishing the results in January 1904.

== Political fallout ==
The family of Chicago Mayor Harrison owned the Chicago Times newspaper. Coverage by Chicago newspapers of what became a political scandal was harsh, particularly from the Chicago Inter Ocean, which was owned by traction magnate Charles Yerkes, an opponent of Harrison.

The January 9, 1904 edition of the Chicago Eagle dedicated all eight front-page above-the-fold columns to Harrison's alleged role in the disaster, with headlines "Harrison to blame" and "Harrison warned", with a two-column wide illustration of the mayor under the center headline "Remember!".

The fire was widely covered by the American and international press, and backlash from the scandal likely was a factor thwarting Harrison's bid to become the Democratic Party vice presidential nominee at the Democratic Convention of 1904. The front page of the January 26, 1904 edition of the Washington Evening Star featured a story about the Chicago coroner's jury findings headlined "Harrison arrested".

First elected in 1897 and reelected in 1899, 1901, and 1903, Harrison did not run for reelection in 1905. His 1907 bid to return to the mayor's office failed. However, he was again elected mayor in 1911 (to a four-year term) but was defeated for re-election in 1915.

== Legacy ==
=== Memorials ===
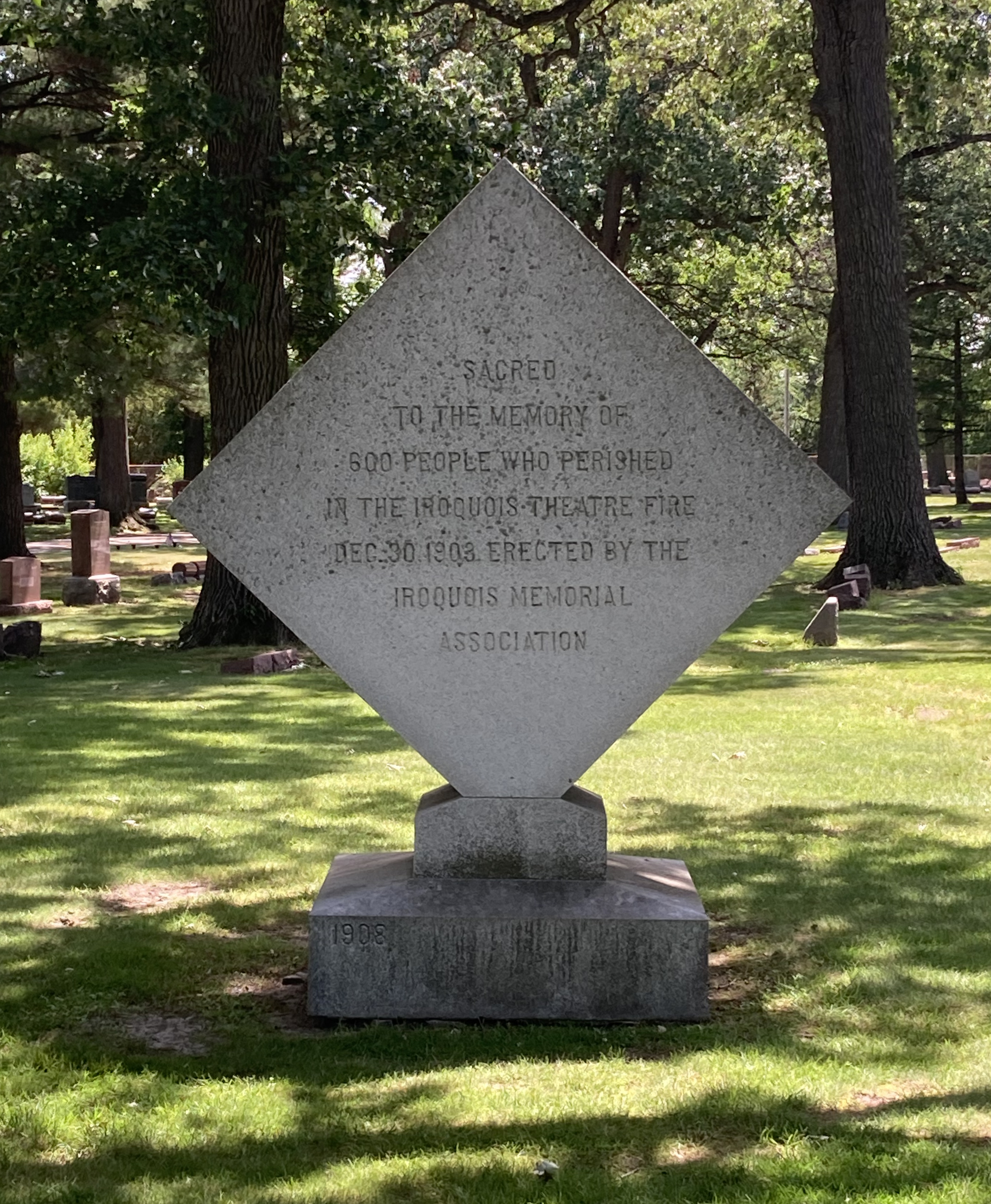
Memorial at Montrose Cemetery

Iroquois Memorial Hospital was built as a memorial to the fire. The hospital held a bronze bas-relief memorial by sculptor Lorado Taft. The Chicago Tribune described the marker on December 31, 1911, as depicting "the Motherhood of the World protecting the children of the universe, the body of a child borne on a litter by herculean male figures, with a bereaved mother bending over it." The bronze memorial was removed from the Iroquois Hospital when the building was demolished in 1951. It was placed in storage in City Hall until it was installed in its current location, near the building's LaSalle Street entrance, in 1960. The memorial was rededicated on November 5, 2010, and a descriptive plaque was donated by the Union League Club of Chicago. The dedication was attended by members of the Chicago City Council, the Union League Club and Taft's granddaughter.

Chicago held an annual memorial service at City Hall until the last survivors died.

Five years after the fire, Andrew Kircher, founder of Montrose Cemetery, erected a memorial on the grounds to memorialize the tragedy.

=== Changes to building codes ===
The Iroquois fire prompted widespread implementation of the panic bar, first invented in the United Kingdom following the Victoria Hall disaster. Panic exit devices are now required by building codes for high-occupancy spaces.

Following the fire, it was required that an asbestos fire curtain (or sheet-metal screen) be raised before each performance and lowered afterward to separate the audience from the stage.

Another result was that all doors in public buildings must open in the direction of egress, but that practice did not become national until the Collinwood School Fire of 1908.

== See also ==
- Rhoads Opera House fire in Boyertown, Pennsylvania, January 1908 – 171 fatalities
- Cocoanut Grove fire in Boston, Massachusetts, November 1942 – 492 fatalities
- Beverly Hills Supper Club fire in Southgate, Kentucky, May 1977 – 165 fatalities
- Ozone Disco fire in Quezon City, Philippines, March 1996 – 162 fatalities
- The Station nightclub fire in West Warwick, Rhode Island, February 2003 – 100 fatalities

== General and cited references ==
- Brandt, Nat (2003). Chicago Death Trap: The Iroquois Theatre Fire of 1903. Southern Illinois University Press. ISBN 0-8093-2490-3.
- Everett, Marshall (1904). Lest We Forget: Chicago's Awful Theater Horror. Chicago: Memorial Publishing.
- Hatch, Anthony P. (2003). Tinder Box: The Iroquois Theatre Disaster 1903. Academy Chicago Publishers. ISBN 0-89733-514-7.
