= Lockrod =

Mechanical device

Lockrods (also called locking rods or cam lock rods) are mechanical devices used to secure swing doors, commonly found on semi-truck trailers, shipping containers, and certain specialty or utility trailers. It is a variation of the espagnolette lock.

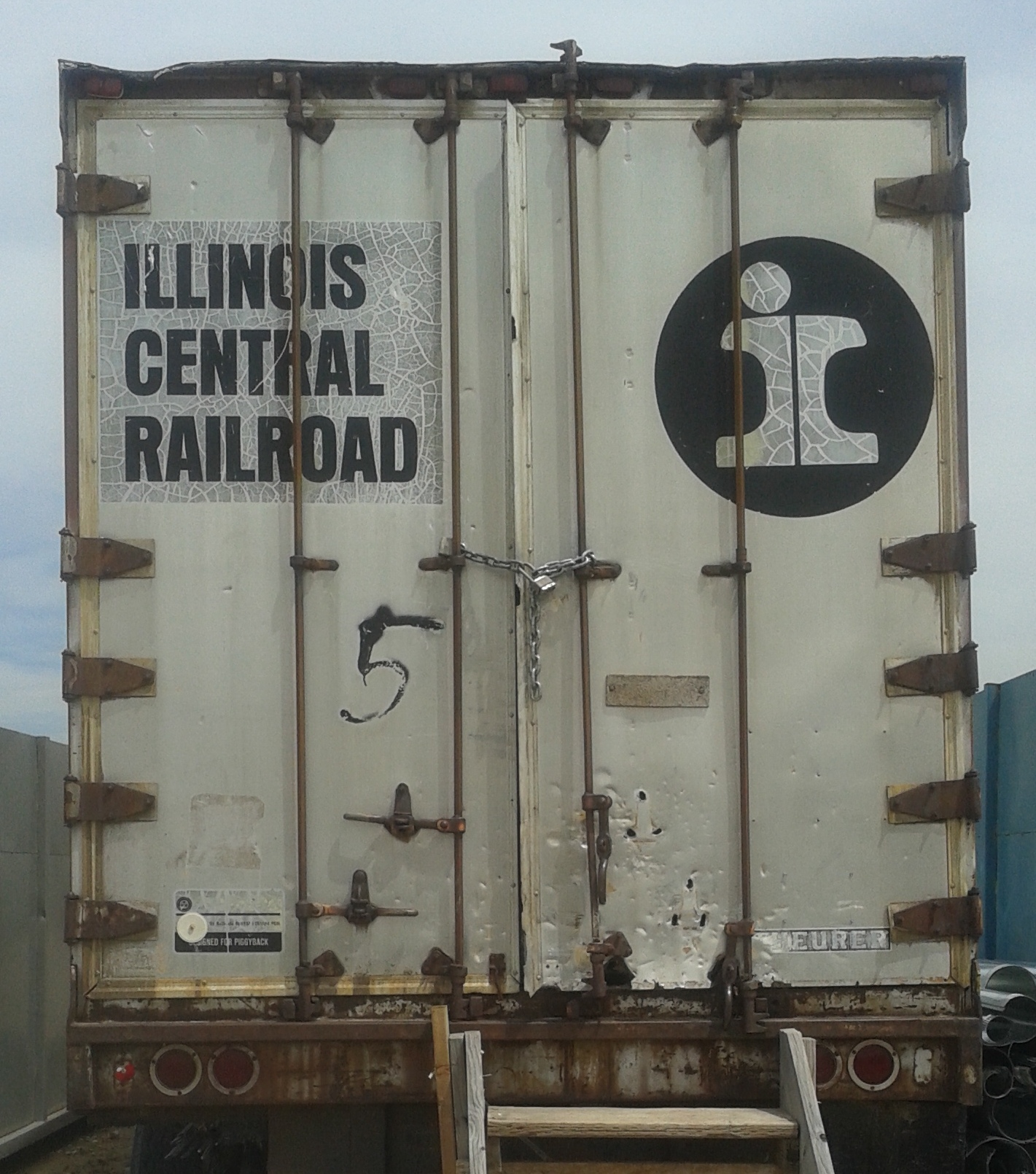
Railroad trailer with vertical lockrods

== History ==
Patented originally in 1912, the lockrod was first used to secure railroad boxcar doors. Today, sometimes confused with locking bars or bar locks, lockrods have evolved to secure virtually every trailer or container that has a swing door (a door that swings open and closed rather than rolls up). Roll up doors are sometimes used in place of swing doors on trailers that make shorter haul deliveries.

Diagram of a refrigerator door from 1912

Swing doors are most commonly used on tractor-trailers (dry vans and refrigerated "reefer" vans), intermodal cargo shipping containers, certain rail cars that carry automobiles, and smaller utility trailers that haul cargo or livestock.

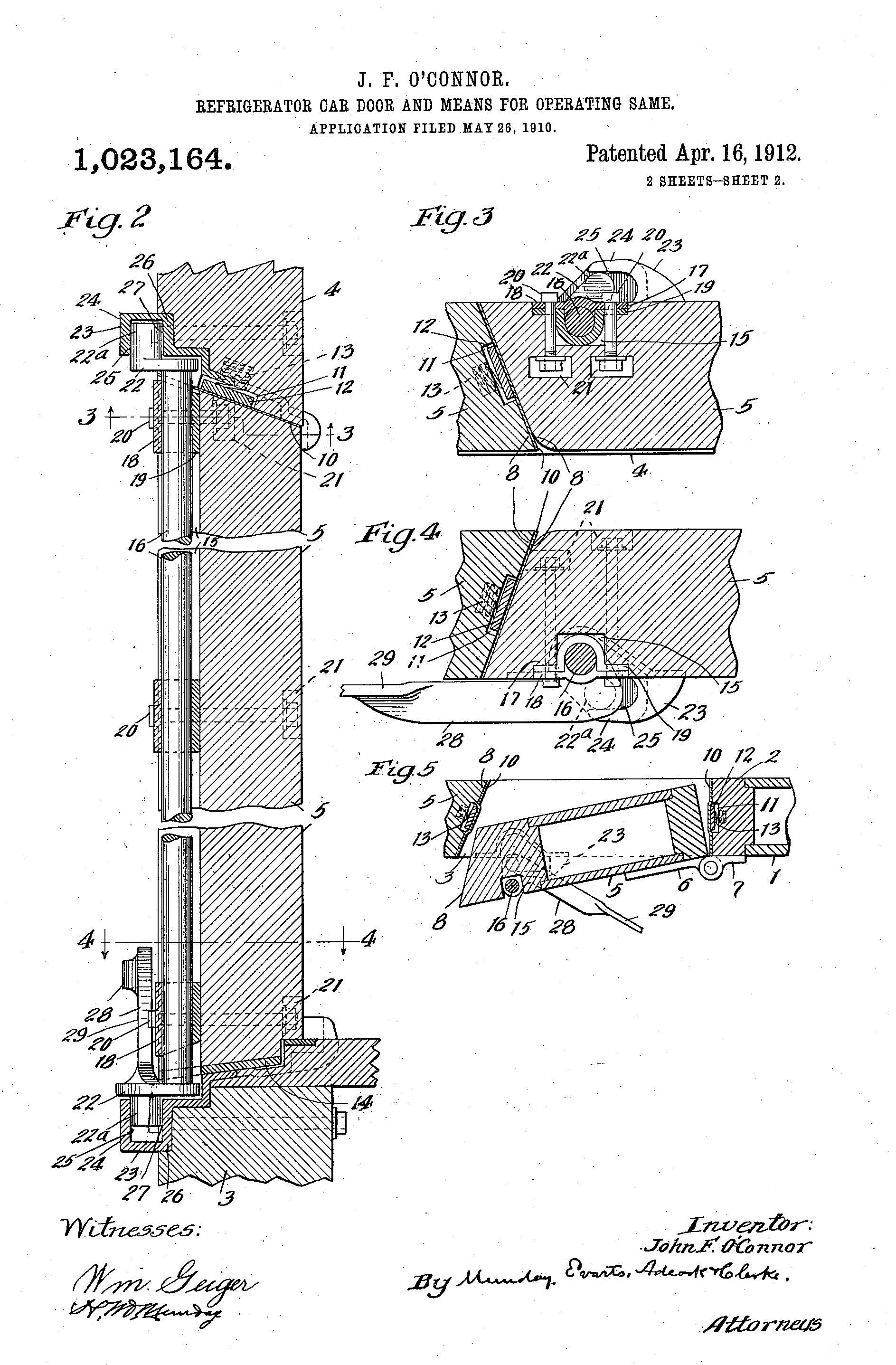
Refrigerator door and means for operating

Miner Enterprises was the originator of the lockrod and owned patent #1,023,164.

== Lockrod use ==
In 1960, Miner Enterprises acquired White Welding in Kenosha, Wisconsin and renamed the product line Powerbrace America. Later the name was changed to Powerbrace Corporation, a subsidiary of Miner Enterprises. Powerbrace continues to manufacture lockrods, trailer door hinges, and security lock devices for trailer doors from its Kenosha plant.

Trailer doors are secured to the end frame (end wall) of the trailer to make sure the cargo doesn't shift and break down the door, and second, to keep the doors aligned properly by not allowing them to move up and down while in transit (racking). If racking occurs due to too much play between parts, the parts wear out and eventually will fail to secure the door.

The doors and end frame must hold the cargo securely while allowing the doors to swing free and be safely opened and closed with minimal effort. Depending on the size of the trailer, trailer end frame components typically consist of six to ten hinges, two to four lockrods, two trailer doors and the framework itself – all made of metal (usually steel, but sometimes aluminum).

== Lockrod construction ==
A lockrod assembly consists of top & bottom cams that are welded to the rod/stick of tubing itself, along with a handle assembly. Keepers (usually sold separately), are the part that accepts the cam, and can be welded or bolted onto the end frame of the trailer and remain stationary to the endframe. Mounting hardware attaches the lockrod to the doors (also sold separately).

All trailer loading and unloading is done through the end frame of the trailer, which endures the highest forces. The top horizontal member is called a header. The bottom is referred to as the sill. The end frame is the action part of the trailer. The rest of the trailer is made up of the box that sits on the chassis, and includes the floor and running gear (wheels, brakes, lights, etc.).

Lockrods come in different lengths and thickness (rod diameter) depending on intended use. Heavy-duty models are one-inch in diameter and are usually made of steel, most often galvanized, but sometimes painted or electropolished for cosmetic reasons.

In lighter duty applications, such as smaller utility trailers, a ¾-inch diameter lockrod can be used; these can be made of steel or aluminum. In addition to the rod and handle, the cams and keepers metal matches that of the other lockrod parts. For example, if the lockrod were stainless steel, cams and keepers would be stainless to match. If galvanized lockrods, the cams and keepers would be made of galvanized steel to match. This metal match-up also minimizes corrosion that occurs when two dissimilar metals are in contact with each other.

Over the years, manufacturers have designed types of cams/keepers combinations to solve certain door alignment problems.

== Types of lockrods ==
=== Zero-torque ===
Diagram showing all parts of a typical lockrod and its mounting hardware

Powerbrace invented the zero-torque lockrod concept that became an industry standard. The main benefit of the design is that the cam goes past the center point so that the more pressure that's applied from the inside of the trailer doors (such as when animal weight is shifted against the door) the tighter the cams and keepers engage.

=== Reach/gather ===
Refers to the ability of a lockrod cam to "reach" and engage the keeper (gather) while closing the door; this feature helps to overcome resistance from compression seals and warped doors.

=== Icebreaker ===
A lockrod model with high door opening leverage, earning its name for its ability to open doors that are frozen shut.
