= Charlie Dexter =

American baseball player (1876–1934)

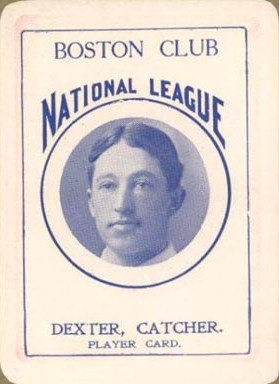
- Outfielder/Catcher
- Born: June 15, 1876; Evansville, Indiana, U.S.
- Died: June 9, 1934 (aged 57); Cedar Rapids, Iowa, U.S.
- Batted: Right Threw: Right

MLB debut
- April 17, 1896, for the Louisville Colonels

Last MLB appearance
- September 27, 1903, for the Boston Beaneaters

MLB statistics
- Batting average: .261
- Home runs: 16
- Runs batted in: 346
- Stolen bases: 183
- Stats at Baseball Reference

Teams
- Louisville Colonels (1896–1899); Chicago Orphans (1900–1902); Boston Beaneaters (1902–1903)

Charles Dana Dexter (June 15, 1876 – June 9, 1934) was an American Major League Baseball outfielder from 1896 to 1903.

== Professional career ==
Dexter's career in baseball began in 1889 with the Evansville Cooks, a semiprofessional ball club. He remained with them until 1894, when he made the decision to attend the University of the South. He also played for the Louisville Colonels, Boston Braves, and Chicago Cubs organizations.

== Iroquois Theatre fire ==
On December 30, 1903, Charlie Dexter and fellow player John Franklin Houseman were in a box watching a show at the Iroquois Theatre in Chicago when the Iroquois Theatre fire broke out; they were credited with breaking down a locked door and rescuing a number of people.

== The stabbing of Quait Bateman ==
In 1905, he reportedly stabbed Milwaukee Brewers first baseman Quait Bateman in the chest while he was drunk. Dexter was taken to jail. Bateman decided to not press charges, as he believed it was an accident, and Dexter was released the next morning.

Quait Bateman

== Personal life ==
In 1934, Dexter shot himself to death in Cedar Rapids, Iowa.

== See also ==
- List of Major League Baseball career stolen bases leaders
