= John Houseman (baseball) =

Dutch baseball player (1870–1922)

- Utility player
- Born: January 10, 1870; Netherlands
- Died: November 4, 1922 (aged 52); Chicago, Illinois, U.S.
- Batted: Unknown Threw: Unknown

MLB debut
- September 11, 1894, for the Chicago Colts

Last MLB appearance
- October 3, 1897, for the St. Louis Browns

MLB statistics
- Batting average: .253
- Home runs: 0
- Runs batted in: 25
- Stats at Baseball Reference

Teams
- Chicago Colts (1894); St. Louis Browns (1897)

John Franklin Houseman (January 10, 1870 – November 4, 1922) was a Major League Baseball player. He played in 1894 for the Chicago Colts, and in 1897 for the St. Louis Browns, primarily as a second baseman.

Houseman was born in the Netherlands, and his family moved to Grand Rapids, Michigan and later Chicago, Illinois, before he began his professional playing career.

Houseman was the second Dutch-born player in the major leagues, following Rynie Wolters, debuting for the Colts in 1894. Houseman played in four games for Chicago, filling in for the ill Bill Dahlen, then 80 games for St. Louis. He also played in the minor leagues from 1891 to 1899.

== Iroquois Theatre fire ==
On December 30, 1903, Houseman and fellow player Charlie Dexter were in a box watching the show at the Iroquois Theatre in Chicago when the Iroquois Theatre fire broke out. They reportedly broke down a locked door, rescuing a number of people.
