= Sliding door operator =

A sliding door operator (or sliding door opener or automatic sliding door operator) is a device that operates a sliding door for pedestrian use. It opens the door automatically, waits, then closes it.

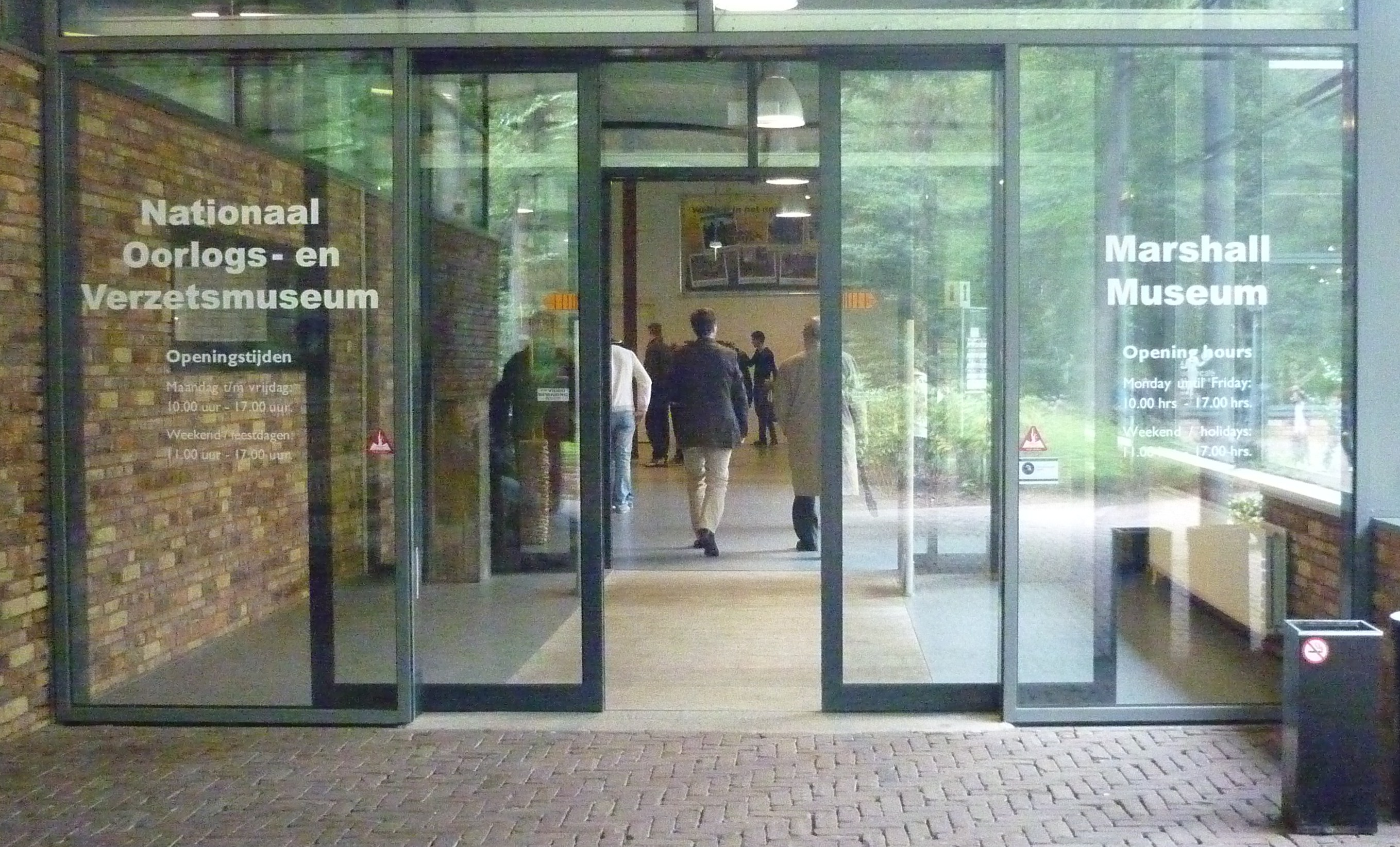
Sliding door with opener at the Overloon War Museum, Netherlands

== Uses ==
Sliding door operators are typically used on the outside doors of large retail businesses. (smaller retail businesses prefer swing door operators.) They are also used in elevators (lifts).

== Triggering ==
A door operator may be triggered in various ways:

- Approach Sensor (such as a radar sensor) - the door opens when a user approaches it.
- Pushbutton - the door opens when a user presses a button.
- Access control - the door opens when an access control system determines the user is authorized to go through.
- Automatically (in the case of elevators).

A trigger from any of the above requests that the door be opened (or reopened if it was closing).

== Safety sensors ==
Sensors can be used to detect obstacles in the path of closing doors. The simplest sensor consists of a light beam aimed across the opening: when the beam is broken by an obstacle, the operator prevents the door from closing. Infrared and radar safety sensors are also commonly used.

Other sensors such as resistance-sensing motors can be used to reverse the closing action of the door after an obstacle is encountered.

== Technology ==
The operator is placed in the space above the sliding door.

An electric motor, geared down to get a lower speed and a higher torque, drives a pulley at one end of a belt. The door is clamped to the belt. To open the door, the motor turns the pulley, which in turn turns the belt, which in turn drags the door. To close the door, the reverse occurs.

Historically, elevator doors were opened using simple harmonic motion by a set of mechanical linkages; the motor, geared down, would rotate linked arms, which in turn would drive the door.

== Types ==
There are several types of sliding doors, these are:

- Standard sliding door (single wing or double wings)
- Telescopic sliding door (two wings or four wings)
- Circular sliding door (segment circular, semi-circular or full circular)
- Sliding folding door (two wings or four wings)
- Hermetic sliding door (single wing or double wings)
- Clean room sliding door (single wing or double wings)
