= Crémone =

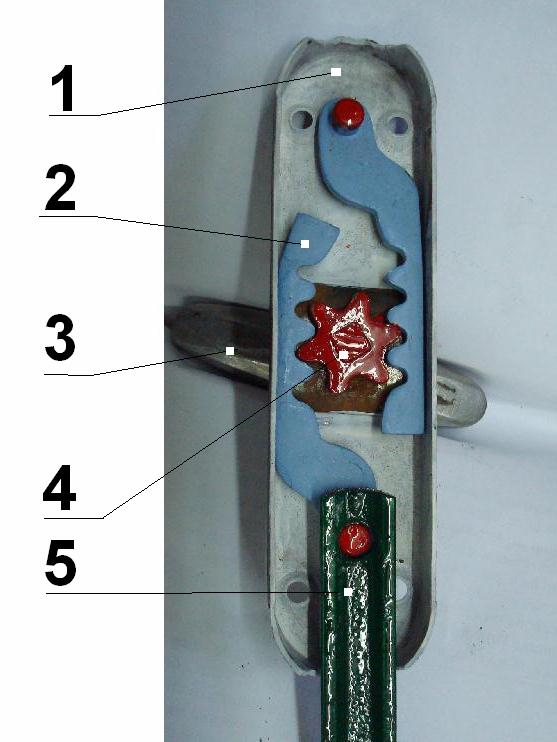
Rear of the gearbox for a crémone bolt

A Crémone or "Crémone Bolt" is a type of decorative hardware used as a locking device to fasten a pair of casement windows. A knob or lever handle is linked by a rack and pinion to a pair of half-round rods or "surface bolts" which slide over the outside surface of the door or window and extend into sockets at the head and sill of the opening. The gear mechanism operates the two vertical rods at the same time; one rod extends up into the door head, and the other extends down into the door sill. The device is similar in appearance to an "espagnolette" lock, but uses a half-round rod.

Shown from the rear, the parts of the crémone bolt gearbox (1) includes the lever or knob (3), which rotates the pinion gear (4), engaging the pair of rack gears (2), which push the two half-round bars (5) upward and downward at the same time (only the bottom bar is shown), into the sockets.
