= Bonnie Maginn =

American actress (1880–1964)

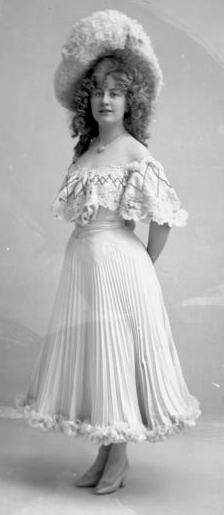
- Bonnie Maginn, from the Burr-McIntosh Photograph Collection, New-York Historical Society
- Born: February 10, 1880; Chicago
- Died: 1964 (aged 83–84)
- Other names: Bonnie Magin
- Occupations: Actress, singer, model, dancer
- Known for: Broadway appearances, 1899-1906; was in the cast of the show during the Iroquois Theatre fire in 1903

Bonnie Maginn (February 10, 1880 – 1964), also known as Bonnie Magin, was an American stage actress, model, singer and dancer, and vaudeville performer.

== Early life ==
Bonnie Magin was born in Chicago, the daughter of John R. Magin and Margaret Anna Sullivan Magin.

== Career ==
Maginn was an artists' model, "said to be the most pictured young woman of her age in America" in 1901, and a vaudeville performer, usually in soubrette roles, in the Weber & Fields shows in New York. In 1901 she shared the bill with David Warfield, Fay Templeton, DeWolf Hopper and Lillian Russell in Fiddle-Dee-Dee at the Chicago Opera House. She was a featured dancer in Klaw and Erlanger's ill-fated production of Mr. Blue Beard, when it opened at Chicago's Iroquois Theatre in 1903. She and the rest of the cast survived the massive and fatal theatre fire during the show's run.

In 1904, she appeared in Frank Daniels' The Office Boy; "she sings after the manner of pretty soubrettes," reported one reviewer, "whose cuteness covers a multitude of deficiencies." In the 1904-1905 season, she was cast in Joe Weber's Higgledy-Piggledy and The College Widower. and in 1906, she toured with Weber's company, performing with Marie Dressler and Flora Zabelle, among others. She retired from the stage before 1910.

Maginn also owned a large cattle ranch in Montana, and was believed to be a multi-millionaire in 1905. In 1906, she was living in New York City, but was identified as the owner of an automobile seen speeding over the legal Sunday limit of 10 miles per hour in Tonawanda, New York.

== Personal life ==
Maginn was the companion of wealthy West Virginia landowner John T. Davis, whose father was politician Henry Gassaway Davis. Magin sued Davis in 1924, for breach of promise, because after he divorced his wife, he did not marry her, and because he stopped supporting her in 1922, though she expected his support to continue. She was also romantically linked with actor John Barrymore. She died in 1964, at age 84, and is buried in Kew Gardens, New York.
