= Swing-door operator =

Device that operates a swing door for pedestrian use

A swing-door operator (or swing-door opener or automatic swing-door operator) is a device that operates a swing door for pedestrian use. It opens or helps open the door automatically, waits, then closes it.

== Types ==
There are 3 basic types of swing door operators:

- Full Energy – It opens and closes the door at full speed.
- Low Energy – It opens and closes the door at reduced speed to limit the kinetic energy of the moving door to levels deemed safe for disabled users.
- Power Assist – This is a version of the low-energy operator. It doesn't open the door; instead, it lets the user open the door manually at a reduced force, compared to opening against a standard door closer. It closes the door with the same speed limitations as a low-energy operator.

== Uses ==
Full Energy operators are typically used on the outside doors of medium-sized retail business. (Larger retail businesses prefer sliding door operators.) Low Energy operators are typically used where a simple door closer is sufficient for able users, yet it is necessary to add access to disabled users: small businesses, apartments, bathrooms.

== Triggering ==
A door operator may be triggered in various ways:

- Approach sensor (such as a radar sensor in the form of a Gunn diode and Waveguide) – the door opens when a user approaches it.
- Pushbutton – the door opens when a user presses a button.
- Push-&-go – the door opens fully when the user begins opening it.
- Access control – the door opens when an access control system determines the user is authorized to go through.

A trigger from any of the above requests that the door be opened (or reopened if it was closing). The operator will heed hat requests only after it is able to do so safely for any other users in the area.

== Safety sensors ==
A door operator may use sensors to prevent the door from coming into contact with a user.

Full Energy operators require at least 3 sensors. Low-energy operators are not required to have safety sensors, as the door is allowed to come in contact with a user, given that the kinetic energy of the moving door is limited by the reduced moving speed.

Historically, sensors have been simply floor mats that sense the weight of a user, one in the area immediately in front of the door (the approach side) and one in the area behind it (the swing side). The approach side mat is often used as a trigger sensor. The swing side mat prevents the door from starting to open as long as some other person is detected in the swing area; once the door starts opening, this mat is ignored, as it will sense the user going through.

Today, infrared safety sensors or laser safety sensor are normally used. Four types are commonly used.

- Header mounted presence sensor—mounted on the jamb above the door, on the approach side, it detects the presence of a person standing in front of the door.
- Approach side, door mounted sensor—mounted on the approach side of the door itself, used as the door is closing to detect a user in the way of the closing door. Some safety sensor also safeguard the hinge area to protect hands and fingers during the closing process. In that case, the operator either stops the door or reopens it.
- Swing side, door mounted sensor—mounted on the swing side of the door itself, used as the door is opening to detect a user in the way of the opening door. In that case, the operator stops the door. The sensitivity of infrared sensors must be reduced at the end of the opening angle, if it starts seeing a wall next to the door, so it may not confuse it with a user. Laser based sensors increase the safety by learning the surroundings of the door and dynamically adapt their detection fields to only ignore the wall next to the door.
- Safety beam—this beam crosses the path of the user past the swing side. If interrupted, the operator assumes that a person has crossed into the swing area, and it is not safe to open the door at full speed. This sensor is ignored once the door has started to open, as then the operator assumes that it is the user having gone through the door that has interrupted the beam.

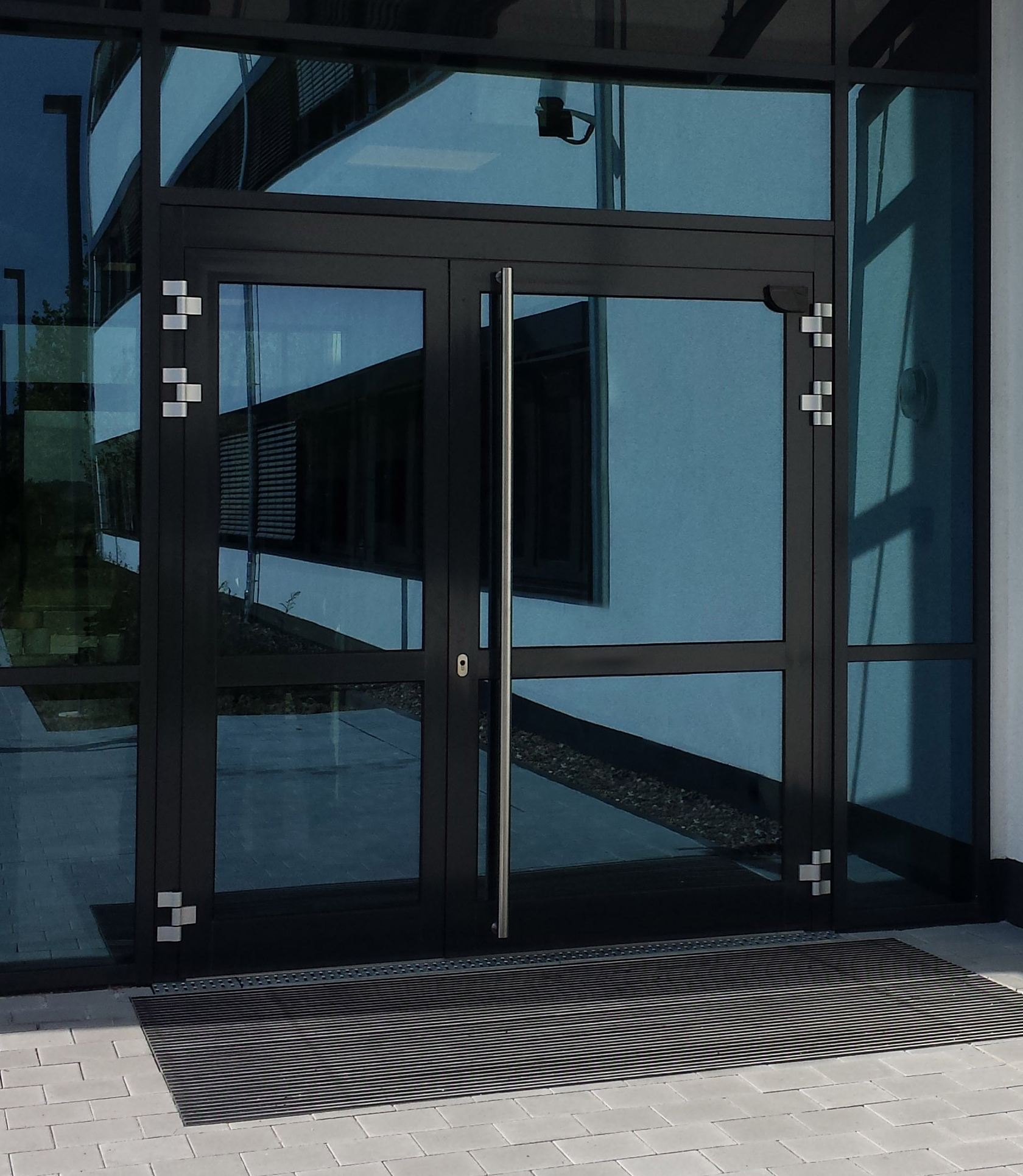
Typical swing door with a laser safety sensor

== Opening technologies ==
The majority of the operators open the door directly or through an arm.

- Overhead concealed mount—the operator is mounted above the door and rotates the door directly, through its pivot.
- Surface mount, push (scissor arm)—the operator is mounted on the wall above the door, on the approach side and pushes the door with a linkage of 2 arms.
- Surface mount, pull (track)—the operator is mounted on the wall above the door, on the swing side and pulls the door with an arm whose end slides in a track mounted on the door.
- Underfloor concealed units—the operator is mounted within the floor and rotates the door directly, through its pivot. This can also be off-set to work in conjunction with door hinges via an off-set door strap.

Variations on the above exist. There are also rare operators that use a mechanism that is disconnected from the door, and reaches out and pushes on the door itself when it needs to open it.

== Internal technologies ==
Operators are powered by an electric motor. They differ in how they use the motor's energy to open the door.

Disengaging, closer-based, push-mount, electro-mechanical operator. View from above. Shades of blue: standard door closer. Shades of red: opener gears. Gold: motor.

Operators use various internal technologies.

- Some are built on top of a standard door closer. To open the door, the operator forces the closer in the opening direction. Then, the closer closes the door. The user may open the door manually, using just the door closer. In case of power failure while the door is open, the closer itself closes the door.
- Some are built without a door closer. The motor opens and closes the door through reducing gears. The operator may or may not include a return spring to close the door in case of power failure while the door is open.

Operators are often categorized by the means by which the motor's energy is applied.

- Electromechanical—the motor uses purely mechanical means to open the door: gears, cams, levers and such. This is the preferred type in the US.
- Electro-hydraulic—the motor drives a hydraulic pump, which pressurizes the oil in a door closer, which in turn turns the door closer and opens the door. This is the preferred type in Europe. (In the US it has a reputation of being prone to oil leaks.)
- Electro-pneumatic—the motor drives an air compressor and may be located away from the door. The air pressure is used to drive the operator above the door. This type is not common, and noise can be a factor if compressor is located close to a door. Typically, the compressor can be located up to 200 feet away ensuring that noise is not a factor. A typical life expectancy of a pneaumtic system is 10–15 years except the compressor. Best application of a pneumatic system is in a residential environment where usage is limited to 30–40 times a day.

Of the electromechanical types, two approaches are used:

- Disengaging—the motor driven mechanism (the opener portion) is not joined to the closer, but only engages the closer when it is needed to open the door. When opening the door manually, the opener portion is still, so the opening is smooth and quiet.
- Permanently engaged—the motor driven mechanism (the opener portion) is always joined to the closer (if present) and to the door. When opening the door manually, the user is also driving the opener portion, so the opening is rough and noisy.

Electro-hydraulic types are inherently quiet and smooth during manual opening, as the motor and pump are off.

== See also ==
- Americans with Disabilities Act
- Understanding by Design
