= Espagnolette =

Locking device

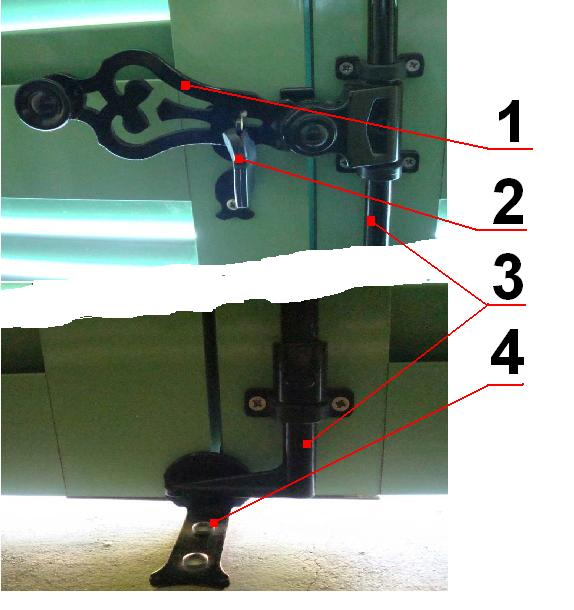
Espagnolette locking device

An espagnolette is a locking device, normally mounted on the vertical frame of a French door or casement window. A handle or knob is connected to a metal rod mounted to the surface of the frame, about a metre above the floor. Operating the handle rotates the rod, which has hooks at each end that fit into sockets at the head and sill of the opening. This type of lock is often used on semi-trailer trucks with dry van and reefer semi-trailers to fasten the rear doors as well as in intermodal containers via lockrods. It can be identified by the use of a round bar, instead of a half-round bar used on a crémone bolt.

The espagnolette mechanism consists of a vertical rotating rod (3) that is mounted using sleeves onto the inner face of the window sash (traditionally on the rebate or strike edge). The rod is centrally connected to a decorative lever arm (1), also known as a paddle or handle, which is hinged and rotates outward from a metal keeper bracket (2). When pulled, this action rotates the rod, which engages or disengages forged hook-shaped ends at the top and bottom. These hooks catch behind metal pins (called "stops" or "studs") mounted on the frame — one of which is visible at the floor (4). In the closed position, the handle may also latch into a fixed frame-mounted hook, ensuring secure locking. This setup allows tall sashes to be locked at both ends simultaneously.

== History ==
Until the Baroque period, windows were typically secured using simple fasteners such as turnbuckles. A major shift in window-locking technology occurred with the development of vertical rod mechanisms, prompted by the increasing height of window sashes. By the late 17th century in France, three key types had emerged: the sliding rod lock, the espagnolette, and the cremone bolt (Baskülgetriebe). The espagnolette features a rotating rod that spans the full height of the sash. By 1771, its design was developed in sufficient detail to be described and illustrated in Diderot's Encyclopédie. The Bavarian court architect Joseph Effner documented the use of espagnolette-style hardware "in the French manner" as early as 1719, during his work on the New Palace in Schleißheim. Espagnolette fasteners remained in widespread use into the 20th century.

== Gallery ==
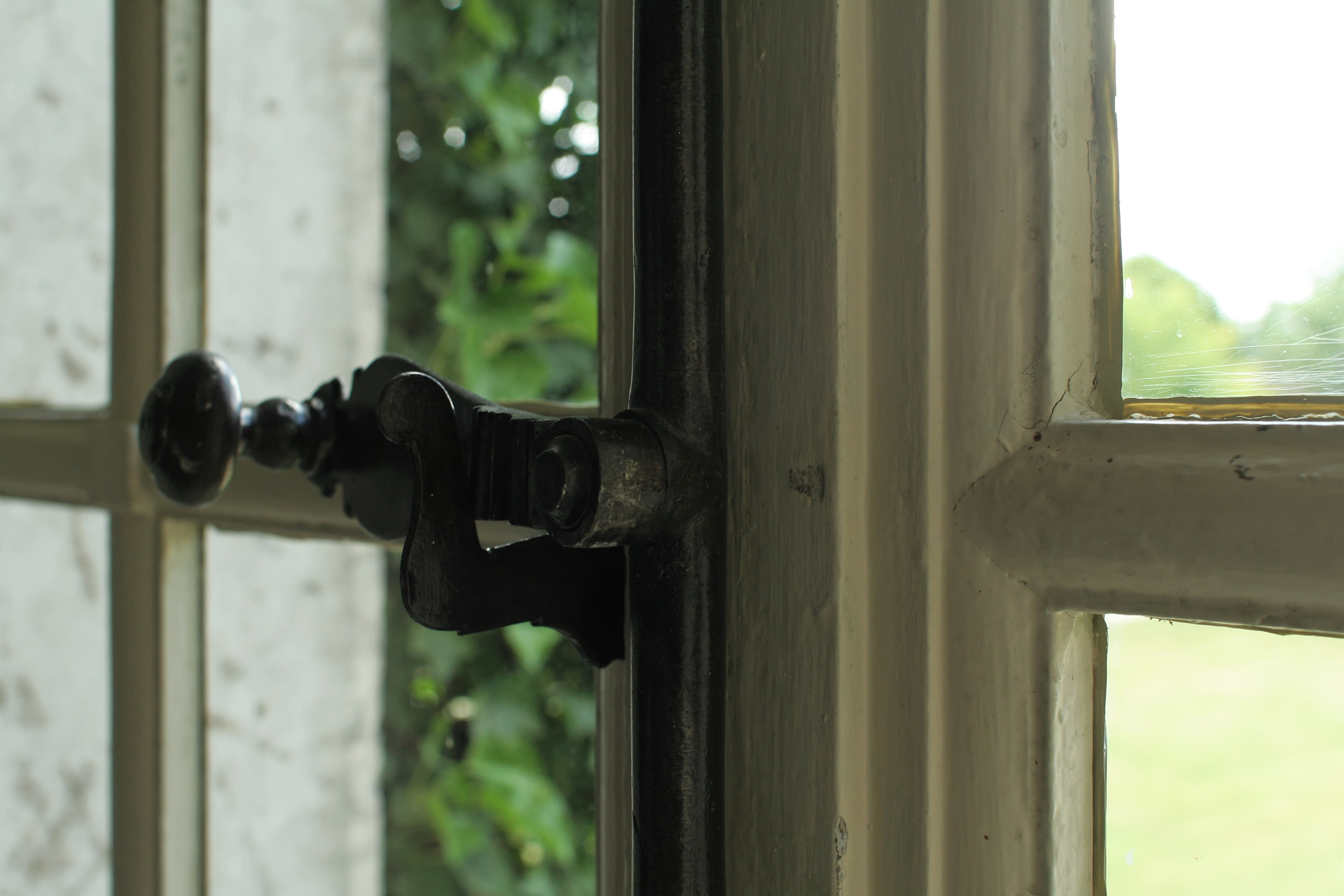
Rod handle (Ruderstange) on the window of the library in a pavilion of Palace of Versailles

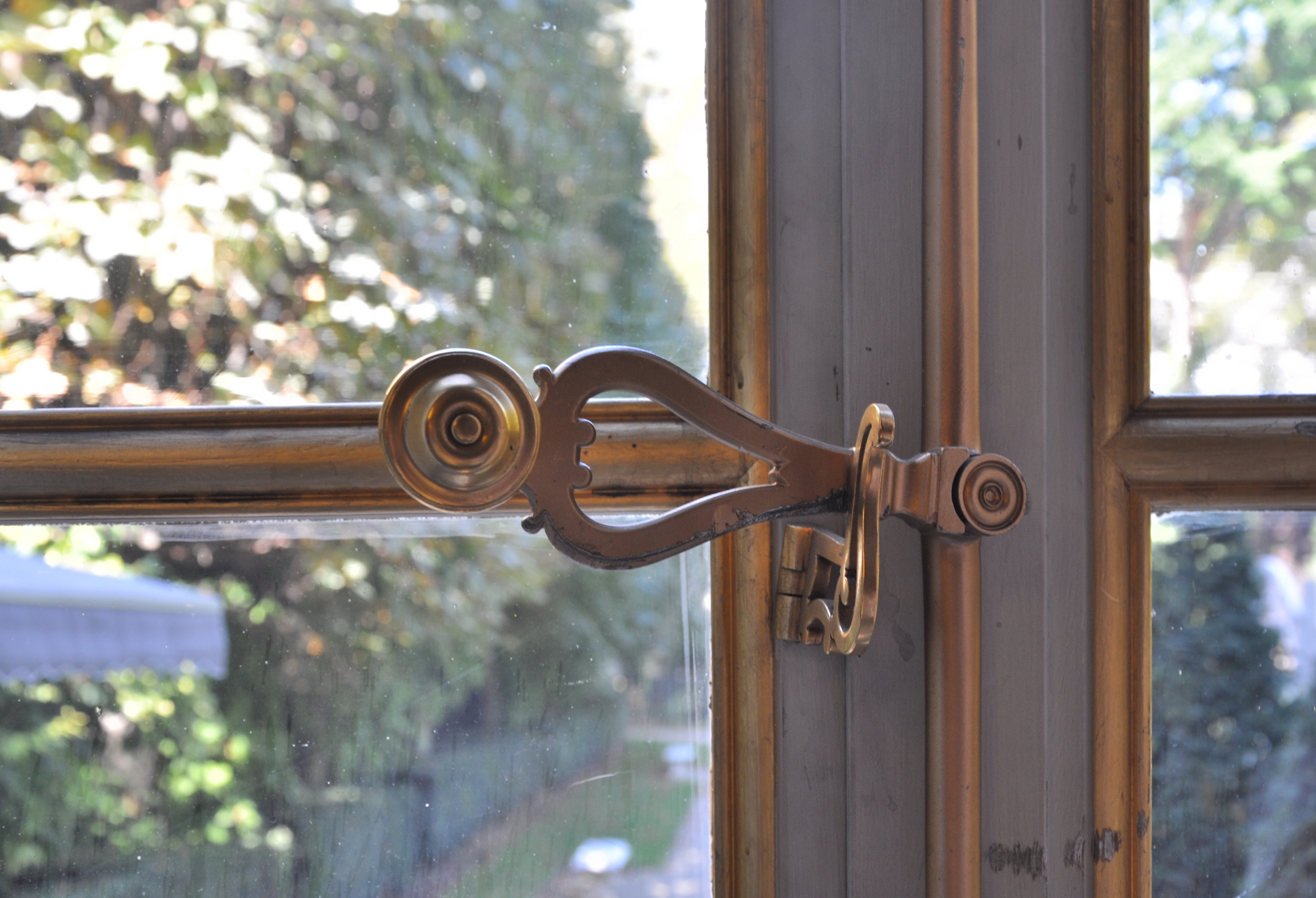
Rod loop (Ruderschlaufe) on the window of the library at the Hôtel de Bourvallais, Place Vendôme, Paris

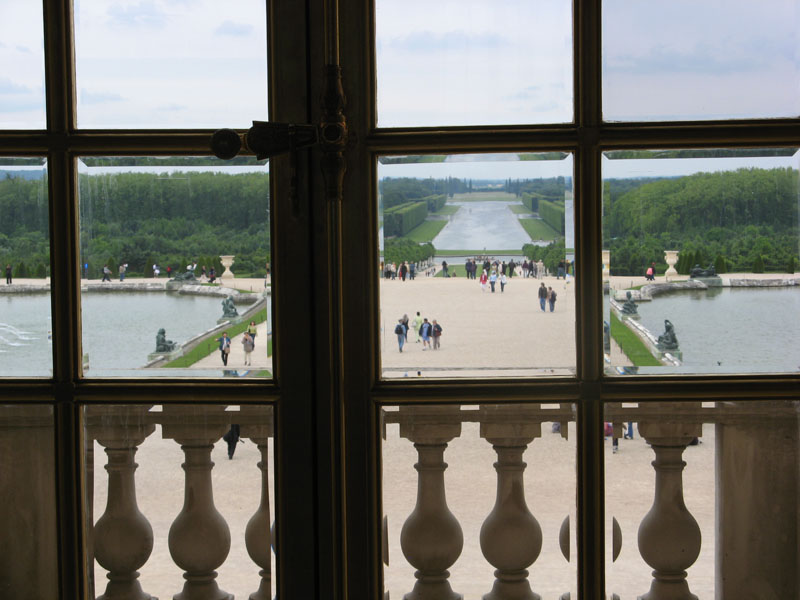
Espagnolettes on the window gallery at the Palace of Versailles

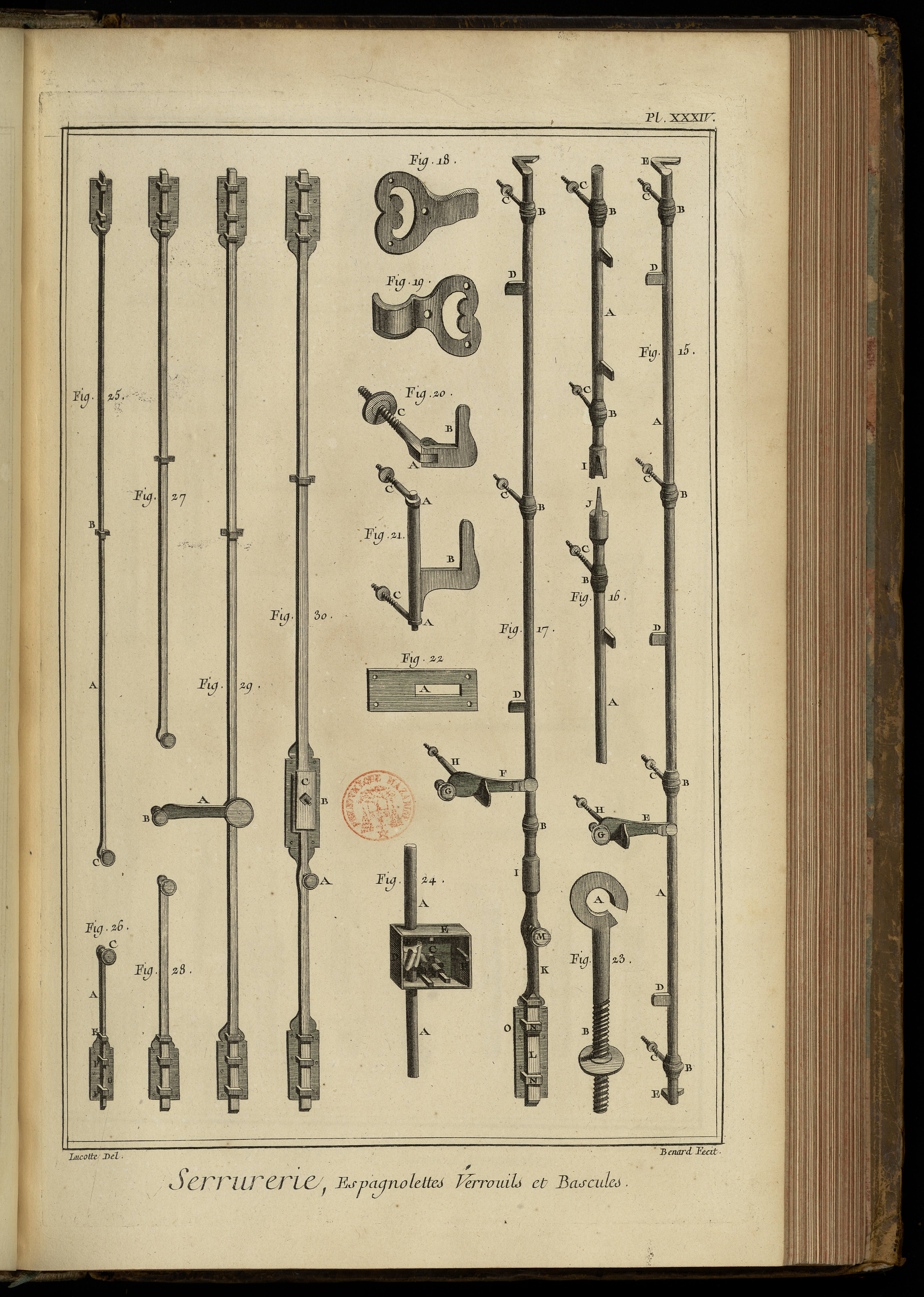
Espagnolette mechanism, from Diderot's Encyclopédie, Plate volume IX, 1771, Plate XXXIV

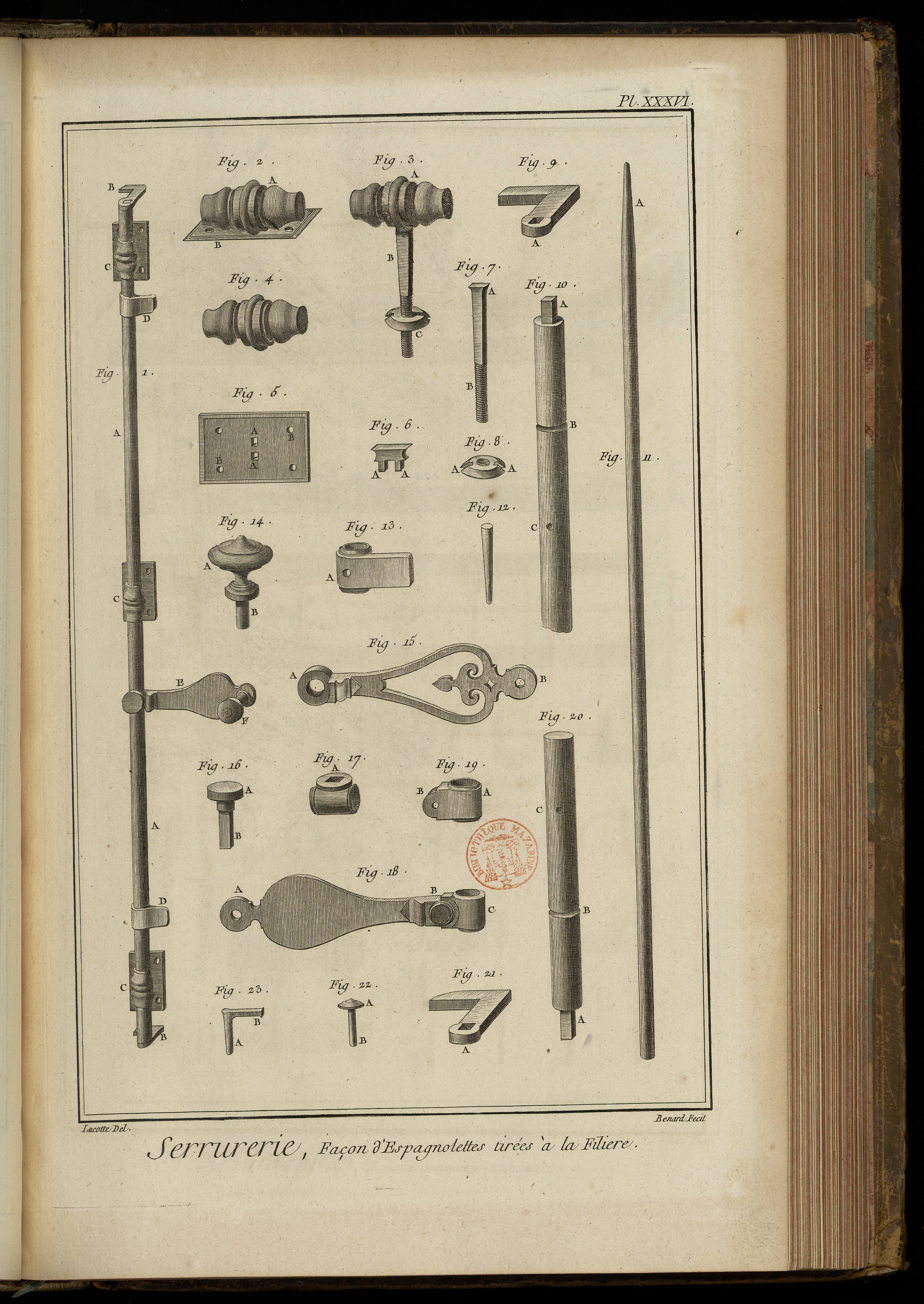
Espagnolette detail, from Diderot's Encyclopédie, Plate volume IX, 1771, Plate XXXVI
