= Lebe (Dogon) =

Dogon religious, secret institution and primordial ancestor

The Lebe or Lewe (fr. Lébé) is a Dogon religious, secret institution and primordial ancestor, who arose from a serpent. According to Dogon cosmogony, Lebe is the reincarnation of the first Dogon ancestor who, resurrected in the form of a snake, guided the Dogons from the Mandé to the cliff of Bandiagara where they are found today.

This Lebe sect is one of the important facets of Dogon religion, based on ancestor veneration as well as the worship of the creator god Amma. This practice of traditional African religion takes four forms:

1. the veneration of Lebe,
2. the veneration of Binou,
3. the veneration of souls, and
4. the "Society of the Masks" (the Awa society)

Dogon religion posits that it was through Amma's powers which brought forth the creation of the universe, matter, and the biological processes of reproduction. With a complex traditional belief system, Amma, the sky god, is the head of the Dogon triumvirate; the other two being the water god Nommo and the earth god Lewe or Lebe.

== Mythology ==
Amma is the Dogon creator god.

The oldest ancestor to which Dogon mythology refers, Lébé Séru (or Lebe Seru) gave birth to two sons. The eldest fathered the tribes: Dyon, Domno (or Domdo), and Ono. The descendants of the youngest form the Arou tribe. Through the fault of his children, the second son prematurely transformed himself into a snake, thereby breaking the natural order of immortality and the taboo of death. As a result, death appeared in the world of men and when it was time for the ancestor Lebe Seru to transform, he could not accomplish it. He died in the form of a man and was thus buried.

When the Dogons, who had previously lived in the Mandé, decided to migrate to flee Islamization, they wanted to take with them the bones of their ancestor. But Dyon, having dug the grave, found only a large living snake there: the "Serpent Lebe". It was this Lebe serpent which guided the Dogon people from Mandé towards the Bandiagara Escarpment where they are found today.

In the 1930s, Dogon high priest and elder Ogotemmeli narrated to French ethnologist Marcel Griaule the Dogon creation myth (fr) and that of the myth of Lebe. In those narrations as documented in Griaule's famous book Dieu D'eau or Conversations With Ogotemmeli, originally published in 1948 as Dieu D'eau, Ogotemmeli described the ancestor Lebe as "an old man" who descended from the eighth ancestor. His body was buried in the primordial field. When the ringing of the blacksmith's anvil filled the air, the seventh ancestor, who was previously sacrificed, reappeared as the Nummo genie; half snake below, half man above. He "swam the first dance" right up to the old man's grave. He entered it, swallowing the body so that it could be regenerated, and then vomited a torrent of water. The bones were turned into colored stones and laid out in the form of a skeleton. Later on, when men decided to migrate, they opened Lebe's grave and discovered therein "the system of stones vomited by the seventh Nommo and this genie himself in the form of a snake." From then on, the priests wore those stones around their necks. "The body of the second sacrificial victim (Lebe), closely associated with the immortal body of the first (Nommo), serves as a foundation for the organization of human society and the division of totemic clans, just as Nommo's body, cosmologically, symbolizes the passage from primordial unity to sexual division and then to the multiplicity of the categories in the universe."

In essence, Lebe did not die. The Dogon believe that human beings needed to learn the third "word" which the seventh Nommo ancestor would have taught them had she not been killed at the instigation of the blacksmith. As such, someone had to die in order to pass over. Therefore, the oldest living man of the eighth ancestral family, who was a perfect embodiment of the "word", died. That man was Lebe. However, in reality, Lebe did not die, as death was unknown at that primordial time according to Dogon religion and cosmogony. Lebe only appeared to have died and humans buried him in the primordial field. That primordial field "contained the body of the oldest man of the eighth family and the head of the seventh ancestor under the smith's anvil."

As his human body was in the grave, the seventh Nommo swallowed Lebe's skull and transformed him and created a current of underground waters which resulted in fiver rivers.

== Veneration of Lebe ==
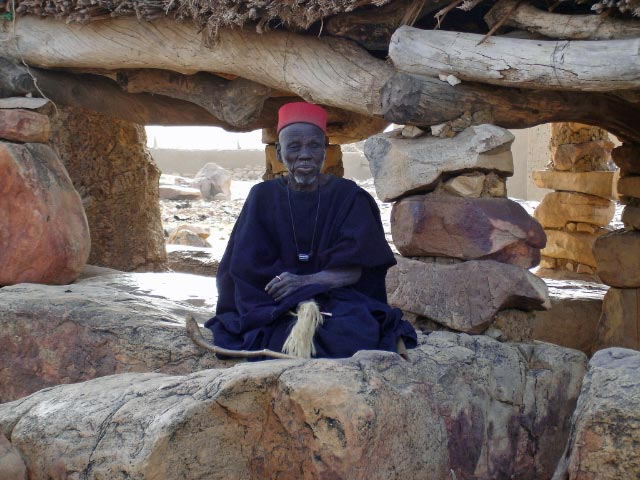
A Hogon, responsible for the veneration of Lebe Seru

During their migration, the Dogons took with them a little earth taken from the tomb of Lebe Seru. The Dogons thought thus of transporting, on the one hand, a sort of ferment which would communicate its qualities to the new terrain, and on the other hand, a material which, if not the sought after bones, would be impregnated with the very substance of the ancestor.

Once they arrived in the Bandiagara region, they made an altar by mixing the soil collected in the Mandé and that of their new home. This marked the beginning of the worshiping of the snake Lebe. Each of the tribes then carried a fragment of this first altar and dispersed along the cliff to find their respective villages. In each newly founded village, a Lebe altar was built from that fragment of the original altar and the execution of religious rites left under the control of the hogon (Dogon priests and elders).

The Dogon worship both Nommo and Lebe Seru. In their religious rituals, they start by sacrificing a goat on Lebe's altar and disclaim:

May Nommo and Lebe never ceased to be the same good thing, may they never separate themselves from the state of being the same thing.'

The sacrifice of Nommo and Lebe are complimentary. The first "serves a cosmogonic purpose; it creates the universal machine and starts it up" whilst the second ensures the soil is fertilized. In essence, Lebe Seru was "originally responsible for the integrity of cultivated land."

The Lebe order is linked to several agrarian religious ceremonies dedicated to the glory and resurrection of the Nommo. Public places in each Dogon village has an altar dedicated to Lebe. The hogon, the Dogons' spiritual elders and high priests, preside over Lebe ceremonies. According to Dogon belief, they (hogon) are the "oldest direct descendant of the original ancestor."

== See also ==
- Pangool
- Mandé creation myth
- Samay (mythology)
- Zin (water spirits)

== Bibliography ==
- Griaule, Marcel, Conversations with Ogotemmêli: An Introduction to Dogon Religious Ideas (contribution: Dieterlen, Germaine, International African Institute), International African Institute (1965), ISBN 9780195198218 (Originally published in 1948 as Dieu d'Eau, pp. 25, 61, 71—3)
- Heusch, Luc de, Sacrifice in Africa: A Structuralist Approach, (trans. Linda O'Brien, Alice Morton), Manchester University Press (1985), p. 132, ISBN 9780719017162 (retrieved March 16, 2020)
- Imperato, Pascal James, Dogon Cliff Dwellers: The Art of Mali's Mountain People, L. Kahan Gallery/African Arts, (1978), pp. 8, 15, 23
- Mission Lebaudy-Griaule [compte-rendu] (Lebaudy-Griaule Mission (report)) [in] Persée. "Mélanges et nouvelles africanistes, Journal des Africanistes (1939) tome 9, fascicule 2. pp. 217-221".
- Asante, Molefi Kete; Mazama, Ama; Encyclopedia of African Religion, Volume 1, SAGE (2009), pp. 40–41, ISBN 9781412936361 (retrieved March 16, 2020)
- Insoll, Timothy, Archaeology, Ritual, Religion, Routledge (2004), p. 123–125, ISBN 9781134526444 (retrieved March 16, 2020)
- Dorey, Shannon, The Nummo: The Truth About Human Origins : (Dogon Religion), Elemental Expressions Ltd (2013), pp. 1, 358, ISBN 9780987681386 (retrieved March 3, 2020)
- "Maison du Hogon (associée au culte du Lébé)".
- 'Solange de Ganay [in] Persée. "Note sur le culte du lebe chez les Dogon du Soudan français, Journal des Africanistes (1937), tome 7, fascicule 2., pp. 203-211".
- Stoller, Paul, The Cinematic Griot: The Ethnography of Jean Rouch, University of Chicago Press (1992), p. 181, ISBN 9780226775487 (retrieved March 16, 2020)
- Velton, Ross; Geels, Jolijn; (edited, illustrated and compiled by Jolijn Geels) Bradt Travel Guides, 2004), pp. 181–3, ISBN 9781841620770 (retrieved March 17, 2020)
