= Binou (Dogon religion) =

Totemic, religious order of the Dogon people of Mali

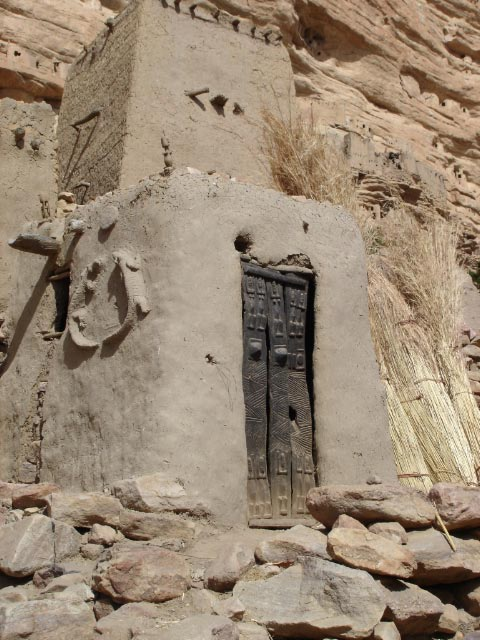
A Binou shrine in the abandoned village of Banani with crocodile representation on the facade.

The Binou (or Binou cult) is a Dogon totemic, religious order and secret ceremonial practice which venerates the immortal ancestors. It can also mean a water serpent or protector of a family or clan in Dogon. It is one of the four tenets of Dogon religion—an African spirituality among the Dogon people of Mali. Although the Dogons' "Society of the Masks" (the Awa Society) is more well known, due in part to Dogon mask–dance culture which attracts huge tourism, it is only one aspect of Dogon religion, which apart from the worship of the Creator God Amma, a rather distant and abstract deity in the Dogon world-view, is above all made up of ancestor veneration (the four aspects of that practice). The Binou serves as one of the four aspects of Dogon religion's ancestor veneration. Other than the Binou and the worship of Amma, the other three aspects of the religion includes the veneration of Lebe (or Lehé), which pertains to an immortal ancestor (Lebe) who suffered a temporary death in Dogon primordial time but was resurrected by the Nommo; the veneration of souls; and lastly, the Society of the Masks, which relates to dead ancestors in general. These myths are in oral form—known to us in a secret language. They form the framework of Dogon's religious knowledge, and are the fixed Dogon's sources relating to the creation of the universe; the invention of fire, speech and culture.

== Etymology ==
The name binou comes from the Dogon phrase ba-binu (or babinou / ba–binou) which means "forbidden". As common in many African cultures, it is prohibited or forbidden to kill, eat or harm (or sometimes even touch) the animal that represents one's family totem. Disobeying this law is regarded as dishonouring the pact that one's ancestor made with the animal/species, and is believed could bring bad omen upon oneself or the entire family or clan.

== Ceremony and shrine ==
The Binou ceremony is a secret ceremony which takes place in a shrine or sanctuary whose form varies from one village to the next. These shrines are highly decorated, single-chambered building with symbolic reliefs and paintings. As a spiritual leader of the Binou clan, a Binou priest's responsibility is to maintain harmony between clan members or humans, and between humans and the supernatural world. During the ceremony, animals are sacrificed, and libations of millet gruel on the façade of the shrine form an important part of Binou rituals and ceremonies. The millet leaves very clear white markings on the façade. Millet gruel is also poured inside the shrine under the supervision of a totemic Binou priest—who alone can access the interior. The ceremony usually takes place during agrarian rites—which tries to ensure good rainfall and harvest.

== Priesthood and totemism ==
The house of Hogon is associated with the veneration of Lebe— the serpent ancestor, whilst the clan Binou is associated with the immortal ancestors. The Hogon and Binou priests may be regarded as complementary counterparts, since both serve as spiritual leaders. The death of a Hogon means a new leader has to be appointed, and this is done by electing one of the village elders to fill the vacant position. After his election, the newly appointed priest goes through a period of initiation, and live his life under strict rules, and is forbidden from engaging in certain normal humanly activities that regular people may take for granted. Some of these include being forbidden from leaving his compound, and not to be touched by anyone—not even his wife or family members.

Clan members are obliged to show respect to their clan's totemic animal or plant, and should not harm or cut it. They are not are not permitted to eat, kill, or dance with a mask representing them. The term ba-binu which literally means "prohibitions" or "forbidden" in Dogon, in reference to a clan or family totem—is a highly held believe in Dogon totemic culture as with many cultures in Sub-Saharan Africa. The village also hosts mask performances. In return for respecting their clan's totemic animal, the ba-binu offers them protection—for example, when a clan member is travelling or in the bush.

Dogon families are tied to one of the eight ancestral groups as per the four sets of twins in Dogon cosmogony and religion. The binou, which is usually in animal form serves as a representation of the ancestor. Every Dogon village or clan has its own totem. Sacrifices are laid before the binou in order to appease the immortal ancestors to look favourably on the living. The "cult of the ancestors" which is another Dogon ceremony is somewhat similar to the binou ceremony. The only essential difference being the former relates to individual families. The main aim of this tradition is to maintain good relations between the living and the dead.

Family household or ginna have their own altars which they dedicate to an ancestor. The head of the family or the ginna bana presides over sacrifices and rituals.

== See also ==
- Samay (mythology)
- Kumpo
- Niasse
- Saltigue
- Xooy
- Pangool

== Bibliography ==
- Velton, Ross; Geels, Jolijn; (edited, illustrated and compiled by Jolijn Geels), Mali: The Bradt Travel Guide, Bradt Travel Guides (2004), pp. 181–3, 197, ISBN 9781841620770 (retrieved March 17, 2020)
- Mission Lebaudy-Griaule [compte-rendu] (Lebaudy-Griaule Mission (report)) [in] Persée. "Mélanges et nouvelles africanistes, Journal des Africanistes (1939) tome 9, fascicule 2. pp. 217-221".
- Bouju, Jacky, Graine de l'homme, enfant du mil, Société d'éthnologie (1984), pp. 33–4, 218, ISBN 9782901161240
- 'Solange de Ganay [in] Persée. "Note sur le culte du lebe chez les Dogon du Soudan français, Journal des Africanistes (1937), tome 7, fascicule 2., pp. 203-211". doi:10.3406/jafr.1937.1641.
- Ganay, Solange de, Les devises des Dogons, Institut d'ethnologie, (1942), 96-8
- Hackett, Rosalind, Art and Religion in Africa, A&C Black 1(998), pp. 35–36, ISBN 9780826436559 (retrieved March 3, 2020)
- Asante, Molefi Kete; Mazama, Ama; Encyclopedia of African Religion, Volume 1, SAGE (2009), pp. 40–41, ISBN 9781412936361 (retrieved March 3, 2020)
- Davis, Shawn R., Dogon Funerals [in] African Art, vol. 35, Issue 2, JSTOR (Organization), University of California, Los Angeles. African Studies Center, African Studies Center, University of California, Los Angeles (2002), p. 68
- Heusch, Luc de, Sacrifice in Africa: A Structuralist Approach, (trans. Linda O'Brien, Alice Morton), Manchester University Press (1985), p. 132, ISBN 9780719017162 (retrieved March 3, 2020)
- Imperato, Pascal James, Dogon Cliff Dwellers: The Art of Mali's Mountain People, L. Kahan Gallery/African Arts (1978), pp. 15, 23
- Roberts, David, Escape Routes: Further Adventure Writings of David Roberts, The Mountaineers Books (1998), p. 218, ISBN 9780898866018 (retrieved March 18, 2020)
- Nugteren, Albertina (Tineke), Religion, Ritual and Ritualistic Objects, MDPI (2019), p. 14, ISBN 9783038977520 (retrieved March 17, 2020)
