= Dogon religion =

Traditional religious beliefs of the Dogon people

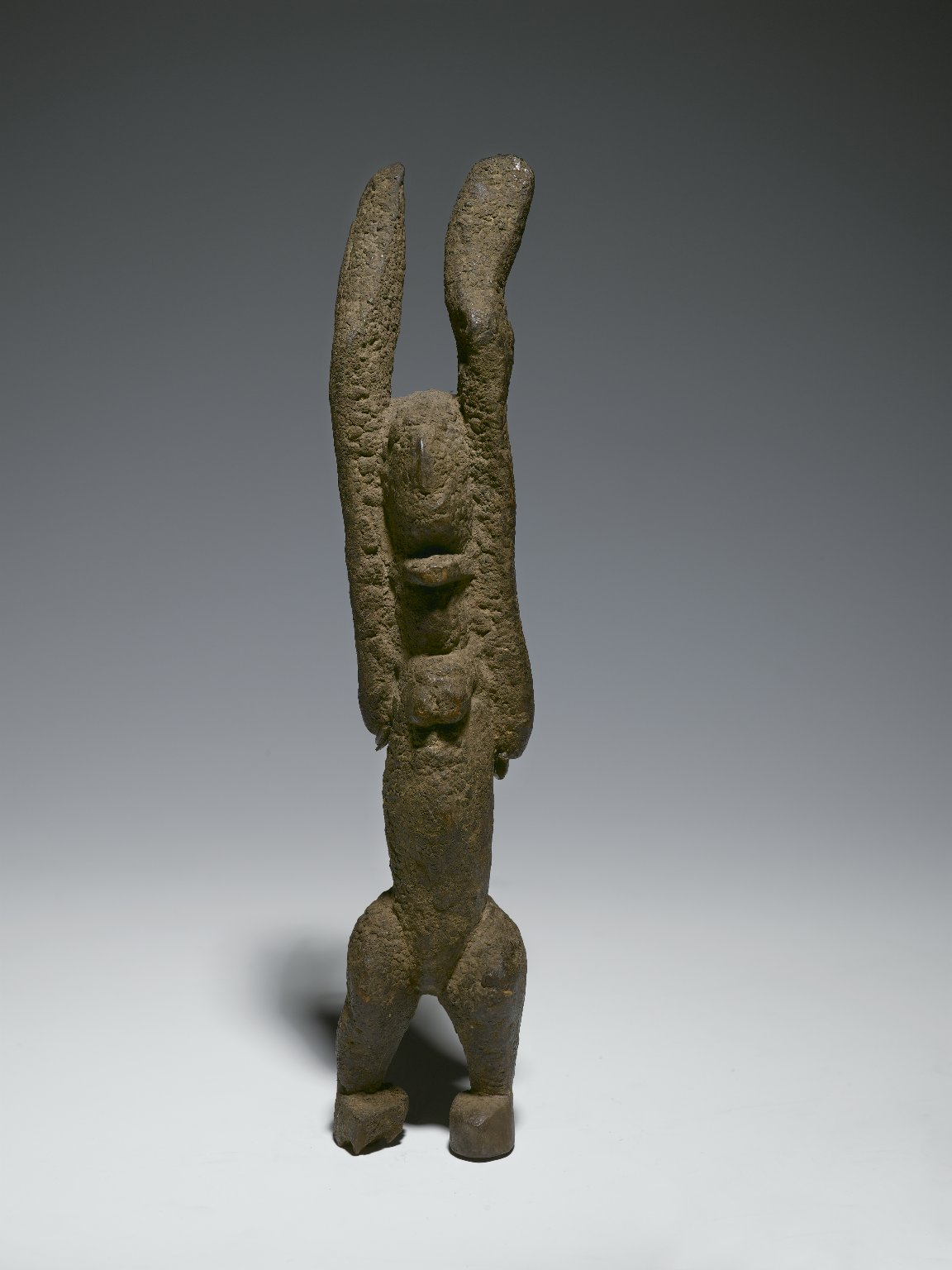
A Nommo figure of the Tellem people

The Dogon religion is the traditional religious or spiritual beliefs of the Dogon people of Mali. Dogons who adhere to the Dogon religion believe in one Supreme Creator called Amma (or Ama). They also believe in ancestral spirits known as the Nommo also referred to as "Water Spirits". Veneration of the dead is an important element in their spiritual belief. They hold ritual mask dances immediately after the death of a person and sometimes long after they have passed on to the next life. Twins, "the need for duality and the doubling of individual lives" (masculine and feminine principles) is a fundamental element in their belief system. Like other traditional African religions, balance, and reverence for nature are also key elements.

The Dogon religion is an ancient religion or spiritual system.

The Dogon religion, cosmogony, cosmology and astronomy have been subjects of intense study by ethnologists and anthropologists since the 1930s. One of the first Western writers to document Dogon's religious beliefs was the French ethnologist Marcel Griaule—who interviewed the Dogon high priest and elder Ogotommeli back in the early 1930s. In a thirty-three-day interview, Ogotommeli disclosed to Griaule the Dogon's belief system resulting in his famous book Dieu D'eau or Conversations With Ogotemmeli, originally published in 1948 as Dieu D'eau. That book by Griaule has been the go–to reference book for subsequent generations of ethnologists and anthropologists writing about Dogon religion, cosmogony, cosmology, and astronomy.

Dogon cosmology and astronomy are broad and complex. Like some of the other African groups in the Upper Niger, and other parts of the continent, they have a huge repertoire of "system of signs" which are religious in nature. This, according to Griaule and his former student Germaine Dieterlen, includes "their own systems of astronomy and calendrical measurements, methods of calculation and extensive anatomical and physiological knowledge, as well as a systematic pharmacopoeia".

== Beliefs ==
=== Divinity ===
In Dogon religion, there is a belief in a single omnipotent, omniscient and omnipresent Creator deity called Amma.

The Dogon religion teaches that, it was through Amma's powers which brought forth the creation of the universe, matter, and the biological processes of reproduction. With such a complex belief system, Amma, the Sky God, is the head of the Dogon triumvirate; the others being the Water God – Nommo; and the Earth God – Lewe or Lebe.

Amma is genderless, and maybe regarded as he, she, or it, depending on which aspect of its principles one is trying to appease. The Deity symbolizes both the masculine and feminine principles. As such, it is genderless or being of dual gender, which invokes balance, duality and pairing of opposites. The cosmological concepts of balance, duality and opposites are found in all facets of Dogon spirituality and culture. This is "consistent with the male and female aspects of biological reproduction that Amma symbolizes."

=== Divinity and humanity ===
Religious sacrifice (Bulo, a word for sacrifice in their language) and rituals are directed to Amma. Carved figurines which act as "representations of the living" are also produced. These figurines are not a physical representation of the Divine, but merely serve as mediators or interceders between the living world and the Divine.

=== Death and afterlife ===
A grasp of Dogon's mask culture and their concept of nyama are important for a greater understanding Dogon's concept of death and the afterlife. King describes nyama in the following terms:

During the 1960s, nommo was defined by black cultural scholars and Africanists as the spiritual-physical energy of "the word" that conjures being through naming. It is the seed of word, water, and life in one that brings to the body its vital human force called the nyama. Nommo controls the nyama by naming and unnaming it—calling it forth. A "body" existence without the liberated life force of the nyama (what I call the "flesh") is worse than dead. It is dehumanized.

The Dogon attributes the origins of masks to beings they refer to as Andoumboulou. The first masks were made of fiber. Although women eventually acquired them, and later men, their function was not apparent to the Dogon until the ancestors started dying. The first ancestor to suffer death did so in the form of a snake. As common in other African beliefs and cosmogonies such as in the Serer myth, a serpent death represents the process of transforming into spirit form. When people realized the negative effects of the nyama released by death, the ancestors decided to carve a mask so that it serves as a support for the nyama. The mask was carved in the form of a snake, symbolizing the dead ancestor. That initial mask, called "imina na" in the Dogon languages ("great mask" or "mother of masks") is the style of mask used in the Sigi ceremony in order to commemorate this mythic event every sixty years.

Although the face of the mask is in snake form, it is never worn. Instead, the Dogon would display it in a stationary position or while carrying it. Every sixty years during the Sigi ceremony, each Dogon village will make a new "great mask". Following the initial death which prompted the production of the "great mask", other deaths followed, and soon after, the Dogon had to seek other measures to deal with the released nyama. Initially, the Dogon erected altars for the ancestors while wood figures served as repository for the spiritual forces. As deaths increased, that became insufficient and masks were then made for dama rituals. The dama is a ritual where the souls of the dead are escorted out of the village and sent to the afterlife permanently. The Dogon have many rituals about death which are important elements of their mask culture.

A four set of masks called bede, and a carved wooden mask called sirige are usually put on for the baga bundo ritual—which is a type of dance held two days after the burial of a man who had participated in a Sigi ceremony. After several years since the passing of the deceased, the dama ritual is performed. The dama last for six days. Its purpose is to raise the prestige and reputation of the deceased and that of his descendants. A lot of time and resources goes towards the preparation of the dama. It is a very elaborate and costly ritual. During the dama ritual, the Mask Society (the Awa Society) performs in the village plaza, at the deceased's house and in the Hogon's sacred fields.

The soul of the dead, which had been localized in the handle of his hoe and in a container of millet beer is then removed from the village—throwned into the bush. Where the dama ritual is performed for a deceased woman, it is not accompanied by mask dancing unless the deceased female was a yasigine—the sole member of the Mask Society.

There are many different types of Dogon masks, some of which represent mammals, reptiles, birds, humans, objects, and abstract concepts. Masks "may be seen as a summary of the people, animal, and things that constitute the Dogon world, a visual accounting of the return to order in the universe following the disruption caused by death."

Like many traditional African religions, the Abrahamic religious concept of heaven and hell does not exist in Dogon religion. Ancestor veneration is however an important element. Sculptures and masks are normally made by Dogon blacksmiths, who also work iron. There are two types of smiths in Dogon society: the jemo who lives on the plains, and the iru who live on the plateau.

As with other West African ethnic groups, blacksmiths' mastery of earth, air, and fire, and their expertise in making iron tools—which the Dogon people depend on for farming—accords them a privileged position within Dogon society. Both the jemo and iru serve as intermediaries and peacemakers between other Dogons, between the living and the ancestors, and between mankind and Amma, especially on rituals surrounding rainmaking. The respect accorded to blacksmiths derives from their role in the creation myth, in which the first blacksmith is said to have descended from the Empyrean Heaven in order to bring mankind fire, iron, and seeds for cultivation.

As with their rites associated with procreation during life, the image of humanity developing in its placenta is also present in their funeral rites. When a person dies, their mouth is covered with a muzzle. This ritual symbolizes the wattles of fish. The dead's head is covered with a white band circling the top of his skull. This symbolizes the top of the fish's head. As they send the deceased to the next life, women and girls perform ritual dances mimicking a fish—with their arms and hands stretched out in front of them—symbolizing the swimming of fish. These movements are done very subtly. "The assimilations go on because a dead person who continues to preserve his spiritual elements (that is, his basic elements) until the afterlife is said to be like "a fish of heaven."

== Ancestral spirits ==
The Nommo are ancestral spirits (sometimes referred to as deities) venerated by the Dogon. The word Nommos is derived from the Dogon language meaning "to make one drink." The Nommos are usually described as amphibious, hermaphroditic, fish-like creatures. Folk art depictions of the Nommos show creatures with humanoid upper torsos, legs/feet, and a fish-like lower torso and tail. The Nommos are also referred to as “Masters of the Water”, “the Monitors”, and "The Teachers”. According to Dogon cosmogony, in primodial time, the Nommo "could not live entirely on land and on their arrival they made a reservoir of water and dived into it."

== Priesthood ==
The Dogon's spiritual leader is called hogon. According to Dogon cosmogony, there were four pairs of twins, four females and four males. They were ancestors of humans. Of these, Griaule M. (1970, p. 223) refer to the seventh as "The Master of Speech"—alluding to its "masculine" characteristics. In the Dogon tradition, the seventh ancestor's gift to humankind included weaving, music, dress and language.

According to Ogotommeli's narrations, "there were no male priests allowed to service in the ancient religion built around the Supreme Being Amma".

== Festivals ==
The Dogon are known for their masks and dance festivals—which are spiritual in nature although sometimes made for tourists. Their dances and masquerades attracts a large number of tourists to Dogon country. However, some Dogons are wary of the over-commercialization of their spiritual art form. There are many Dogon festivals some of which are listed below. All these festivals occurs within precise temporal cycles and are occasions for young Dogon men to complete their initiation rites and receive knowledge from their father, grandfather, or head of family (ginna bana).

1. Bulo : Like the Xooy divination ceremony of the Serer people of Senegambia, the Bulo is a New Year festival celebrated between May and June in Dogon country. It is an agrarian festival marking the beginning of the rainy season and millet cultivation. Unlike the Xooy however—which is presided over by the Saltigue (the Serer priestly class), the Bulo festival is characterized by masked dances and overflowing canaries of millet beer. The Bulo festival signals the start of the sowing season. It takes place during the estival solstice.
2. Sigi : The Sigi (or Sigui) festival pays homage to Dogon's primordial time, and it's a way of atonement and transmitting secret and ancient knowledge to the younger generation. It is mainly about communicating the revelation of speech to men, a ceremony of atonement and initiation, and a way of demanding pardon for the death of an ancestor after the folly and forgetfulness of some young men. It is a long procession that starts and ends in the village of Youga Dogorou. The Sigi festival is one of the most well known and anticipated Dogon festivals, and perhaps the most important of all the Dogon rituals. The Sigi occurs once every sixty years in the Dogon calendar—determined by the position of the star Sirius in the night sky. A person may only live to witness one Sigi festival, or two if they are lucky to live long enough. The 60-year interval is so precise it has baffled some scholars such as anthropologist and filmmaker Jean Rouch—many of whose works are about the subject. The 60-years interval also corresponds to the life span of the mystic Dogon ancestor. Every five days, the Dogon would tie a knot on a rope. This constitutes the Dogon week. In so doing, they are able to celebrate the Sigi with such precision. The last 4 Sigi celebrations occurred in 1787, 1847, 1907, and 1967. The next one will be in the year 2027 (as of 2020). The Sigi ritual and rituals of its sort which occurs within precise temporal cycles are a way of transmitting knowledge among the Dogon. "Many Dogon rituals use the image of humanity in formation in the placenta of the regeneration universe." The night before the sixtieth anniversary celebration, the male participants enter a bush in an isolated cave and go into fasting—abstaining from food and drink. In the morning of the ceremony, they shave their heads—symbolizing rebirth, an act which endeavours to assimilate them to newborn children. They then put on the Sigi costume and dressed to look like fish. A white cap that represents the head of a catfish is put on. A wide pair of black trousers gathered at the ankles with its tail bifurcated is also put on. The colour black symbolizes the waters of the womb. On their chests, they wear some type of crossbelt adonned with cowries which symbolizes the fish's eggs. On their right hands, they hold a crooked staff. This staff, symbolizes the sexual organ of Nommo—the mythical ancestor of humans. Along with the staff, they also hold a half calabash that they will use to drink the Sigi beer. This imagery symbolizes "Amma's womb" in which the gestation of the universe took place according to Dogon cosmogony. The Sigi runs for several years. The last one ran from 1967 to 1973.
3. Dama : The Dama ceremony marks the end of bereavement.
4. Bado : The Bado festival is a festival of the elders which occurs in spring.
5. Bago : The Bago festival which is a festival of harvest takes place during fall.
6. Gogo : A winter festival.

== See also ==
- Masquerade in Mende culture
- Persecution of traditional African religion

== Bibliography ==
- Asante, Molefi Kete; Mazama, Ama; Encyclopedia of African Religion, Volume 1, SAGE (2009), pp. 40–41, 213, 249, 268, ISBN 9781412936361 (retrieved March 3, 2020)
- Insoll, Timothy, Archaeology, Ritual, Religion, Routledge (2004), p. 123–125, ISBN 9781134526444 (retrieved March 3, 2020)
- Griaule, Marcel, Conversations with Ogotemmêli: An Introduction to Dogon Religious Ideas (contribution: Dieterlen, Germaine, International African Institute), International African Institute (1965), ISBN 9780195198218 (Originally published in 1948 as Dieu d'Eau)
- Heusch, Luc de, Sacrifice in Africa: A Structuralist Approach, (trans. Linda O'Brien, Alice Morton), Manchester University Press (1985), ISBN 9780719017162 (retrieved March 3, 2020)
- Gravrand, Henry, La Civilisation Sereer - "Pangool", vol. 2. Les Nouvelles Editions Africaines du Senegal (1990), pp. 194–5, 199-203 ISBN 2-7236-1055-1
- Calame-Griaule, Geneviève, Words and the Dogon World, Institute for the Study of Human Issues (1986), p. 301, ISBN 9780915980956
- Curry, Patrick, Divination: Perspectives for a New Millennium, Routledge (2016), p. 30, ISBN 9781317149026 (retrieved March 3, 2020)
- Peck, Philip M., '"Recasting Divination Research'" [in] John Pemberton III (ed.), Insight and Artistry in African Divination (Washington, DC and London: Smithsonian Institution Press (2002), pp. 25–33
- Imperato, Pascal James, Dogon Cliff Dwellers: The Art of Mali's Mountain People, L. Kahan Gallery/African Arts, (1978), p. 8
- Ezra, Kate, Art of the Dogon: Selections from the Lester Wunderman Collection, Metropolitan Museum of Art (1988), pp. 23–25, 48, ISBN 9780810918740 (retrieved March 3, 2020)
- Tally, Justine, Toni Morrison's 'Beloved': Origins, Routledge (2008), p. 122, ISBN 9781134361311 (retrieved March 3, 2020)
- Petit, Véronique, Population Studies and Development from Theory to Fieldwork, Springer (2017), p. 33, ISBN 9783319617749 (retrieved March 3, 2020)
- Bruijn, Mirjam de; & Dijk, Rijk van; The Social Life of Connectivity in Africa, Palgrave Macmillan (2012), pp. 250, 264, ISBN 9781137278012 (retrieved March 3, 2020)
- Adjaye, Joseph K., Time in the Black Experience (Issue 167 of Contributions in Afro-American and African studies, ISSN 0069-9624), Greenwood Publishing Group (1994), p. 92, ISBN 9780313291180 (retrieved March 3, 2020)
- Indian Council for Africa, Indian Centre for Africa; Africa Quarterly, Volumes 45-46, Indian Centre for Africa (2006), p. 51
- Griaule, Marcel (1970, (original 1965)), Conversations With Ogotemmêli: an Introduction To Dogon Religious Ideas , p. 97, ISBN 978-0-19-519821-8
- Santillana, Giorgio De; Dechend, Hertha von; Hamlet's Mill: An Essay on Myth and the Frame of Time, David R. Godine Publisher (1977), p. 353, ISBN 9780879232153 (retrieved March 3, 2020)
- Ogunmodede, Francis Ishola, African Philosophy Down the Ages: 10,000 BC to the Present, Hope Publications (2004), ISBN 9789788080114
- Hackett, Rosalind, Art and Religion in Africa, A&C Black 1(998), pp. 35–36, ISBN 9780826436559 (retrieved March 3, 2020)
- Davis, Shawn R., Dogon Funerals [in] African Art, vol. 35, Issue 2, JSTOR (Organization), University of California, Los Angeles. African Studies Center, African Studies Center, University of California, Los Angeles (2002), p. 68
- Andian Council for Africa, Indian Centre for Africa; Africa Quarterly, Volumes 45-46, Indian Centre for Africa (2006), p. 51
- Masolo, D. A., African Philosophy in Search of Identity : African systems of thought, (ed. International African Institute), Indiana University Press (1994), pp. 68–71, ISBN 9780253207753 (retrieved March 3, 2020)
- Andreozzi, Matteo; Massaro, Alma; Stallwood, Kim; and Tonutti, Sabrina; Relations 1.2 - November 2013: Inside the Emotional Lives of Non-human Animals: Part II, LED Edizioni Universitarie (2013), p. 14, ISBN 9788879166560 (retrieved March 3, 2020)
- Insoll, Timothy, (Editors: Alcock, Susan; Yoffee, Norman); (Contributors: Alcock, Susan; Dillehay, Tom; Yoffee, Norman; Shennan, Stephen; Sinopoli, Carla;)), The Archaeology of Islam in Sub-Saharan Africa, Cambridge University Press (2003), p. 356, ISBN 9780521657020 (retrieved March 3, 2020)
- King, Debra Walker, Deep Talk: Reading African-American Literary Names, University of Virginia Press (1998), p. 37, ISBN 9780813918525
- Paulme, Denise .Organisation sociale des Dogon (Soudan français), F. Loviton (1940), pp. 182–88
- Dieterlen, Germaine; Ganay, Solange de, Le génie des eaux chez les Dogons. Issue 5 of Miscellanea Africana Lebaudy, ISSN 1775-3236, P. Geuthner (1942), pp. 6–8
- Griaule, Marcel, Masques Dogons, Volume 33, Institut d'Ethnologie (1938), pp. 48–51
- Editor: Bonnefoy, Yves; (translated by: Doniger, Wendy; compiled by: Bonnefoy, Yves), American, African, and Old European Mythologies, University of Chicago Press (1993), p. 124, ISBN 9780226064574 (retrieved March 3, 2020)
- Velton, Ross, Mali: The Bradt Safari Guide, Bradt Travel Guides (2009), p. 192, ISBN 9781841622187 (retrieved March 13, 2020)
- Crowley, Vivianne; Crowley, Christopher; Carlton Books, Limited (2002), p. 195, ISBN 9781858689876
