= Ogotemmeli =

Dogon elder and high priest (died 1962)

- Born: Ogotemmeli; Mali (modern country)
- Died: 1962
- Occupation: Hogon
- Known for: Dogon religion, cosmogony and cosmology

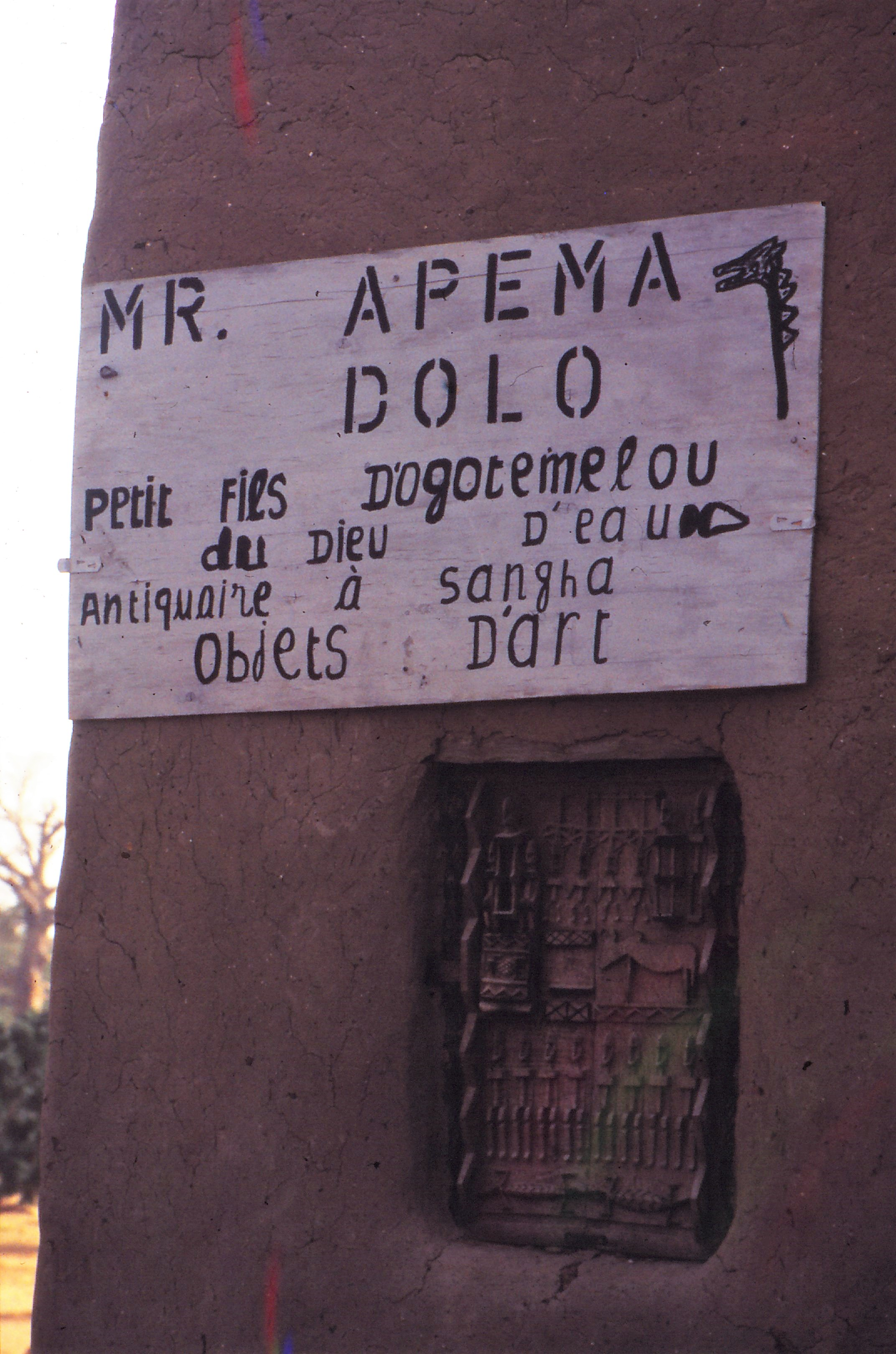
An art dealer in Sangha, Mali, professes to be the grandson of Ogotemmeli, known from Griaule's publications, 1990

Ogotemmeli (also: Ogotemmêli or Ogotommeli, died 1962) was the Dogon elder and hogon who narrated the cosmogony, cosmology and symbols of the Dogon people to French anthropologist Marcel Griaule during the 1930s, 1940s, and 1950s, that went on to be documented and adapted by contemporary scholars. A lot of what is known about the Dogon religion, cosmogony and symbolism came from Griaule's work, which in turn came from Ogotemmeli—who taught it to him.

== Early life and work ==
Ogotommeli was blind since his youth as a result of his gun accidentally exploding in his face during a hunting expedition. That incident occurred as he was about to fire at a porcupine. Despite the painful accident and his disability, Ogotemmeli attributed it to fate. As a diviner, elder and hogon, Ogotemmeli recounted that this fate was previously made known to him, but he chose to ignore it, and as such, had paid a costly price for ignoring the predictions.

In 1931, Marcel Griaule was on an ethnographical expedition in West Africa. He has heard of Ogotemmeli's name and reputation—as a famous diviner and "a man of outstanding wisdom" in the region. As such, Griaule tried to get an interview with him—sending messengers to search for him. When Ogotemmeli finally agreed to the interview, Griaule left for the Dogon region of Mali in 1933. For thirty–three days, Ogotemelli divulged to Griaule the Dogon's belief system.

Those conversations with Ogotemmeli resulted in Griaule's most famous work—a diary of religious instructions by the high priest titled Dieu D'eau or Conversations With Ogotemmeli (Griaule, M., Conversations with Ogotemmêli: An Introduction to Dogon Religious Ideas (contribution: Dieterlen, Germaine, International African Institute), International African Institute (1965), ISBN 9780195198218 (Originally published in 1948 as Dieu d'Eau)), and a finished anthropological report on the Dogon religion titled Le Renard Pale or The Pale Fox.

Griaule's work has been criticised by scholars over the years as being "too idealistic at the expense of historical dynamism."

In anthropology, Ogotemmeli has become a well known name, to the extent that "it epitomizes 'the informant', the person who describes phenomena and traits of his/her own culture, making them understandable to the researcher."

== Death ==
Ogotemmeli died in 1962.

== See also ==
- Saltigue
- Nommo
- Serer creation myth
- Serer religion

== Bibliography ==
- Asante, Molefi Kete; Mazama, Ama; Encyclopedia of African Religion, Volume 1, SAGE (2009), pp. 40–41, 213, 268, ISBN 9781412936361.
- Insoll, Timothy, Archaeology, Ritual, Religion, Routledge (2004), p. 123–125, ISBN 9781134526444 (retrieved March 3, 2020)
- Scranton, Laird, (cont. John Anthony West), Sacred Symbols of the Dogon: The Key to Advanced Science in the Ancient Egyptian Hieroglyphs, Simon and Schuster (2007), pp. 151–2, ISBN 9781594777530 (retrieved March 3, 2020)
- Indian Council for Africa, Indian Centre for Africa; Africa Quarterly, Volumes 45–46, Indian Centre for Africa (2006), p. 51
- Masolo, D. A., African Philosophy in Search of Identity : African systems of thought], (ed. International African Institute), Indiana University Press (1994), pp. 68–69, ISBN 9780253207753.
- Andreozzi, Matteo; Massaro, Alma; Stallwood, Kim; and Tonutti, Sabrina; Relations 1.2 - November 2013: Inside the Emotional Lives of Non-human Animals: Part II, LED Edizioni Universitarie (2013), p. 14, ISBN 9788879166560
