= Awa Society =

African mask and initiatory society of the Dogon people of Mali

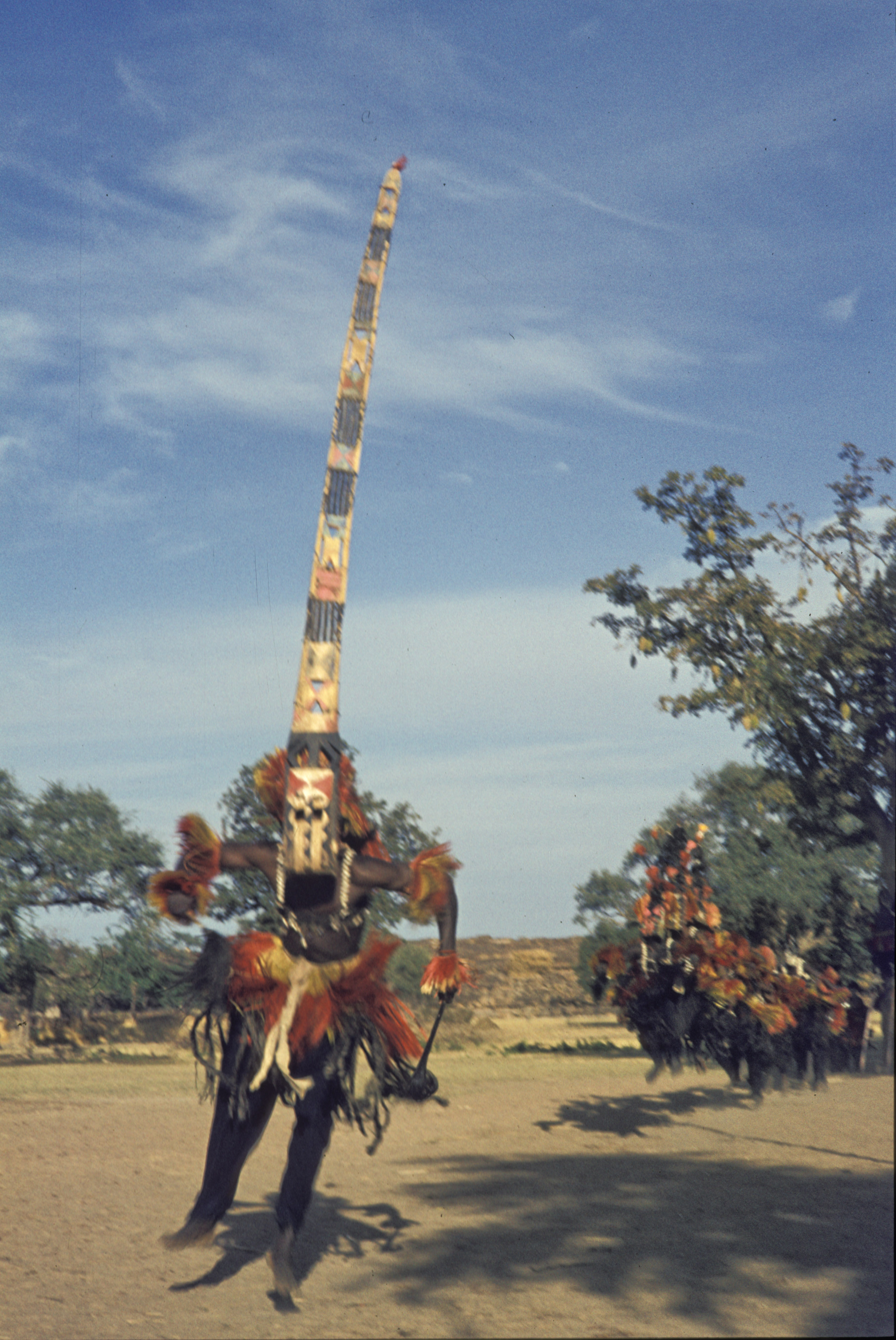
A man wearing a Sirige mask jumps during a ceremony, 1974. The Sirige mask is a tall mask that is used in funerals for only the men who were alive during the holding of the Sigui ceremony.

Awa (in Dogon), also known as the Awa Society, the Society of Masks, is an African mask and initiatory society of the Dogon people of Mali which is made up of circumcised men, and whose role is both ritual and political within Dogon society. The Awa Society takes an important role in Dogon religious affairs, and regularly preside over funereally rites and the dama ceremony—a ritual ceremony that marks the end of bereavement in Dogon country ( fr ). This Society is one of the important aspects of Dogon religious life—which is primarily based on the worship of the single omnipotent, omniscient and omnipresent Creator God Amma and the veneration of the ancestors. Although it is only one aspect of Dogon's religious sects, it is perhaps more well known than the others partly due to Dogon mask–dance culture which attracts huge tourism, and their masks highly sought after, and in fact, one of the first to be sought after by art collectors in the west.

== Etymology ==
The Dogon word awa (not to be confused with the Arabic name for Eve, Hawa/Awa) comes from the Dogon's Sacred language of Sigi so of Sangha, Mali. The term is used to describe several things: fibre ornaments and masks worn by members of the Society, masked dancers, all men age to participate in ritual dances, or the Society itself.

== Purpose ==
The ritual performances of the Awa include various masks and dress. When a person of importance dies, members of the Society wear a special kind of African mask called the Kanaga, and perform a ritual dance on the roof of the deceased in order to escort the soul (nyama) of the dead to its final resting place, and to defend the living from bad wandering souls that might linger and wish to cause harm to the living. These ritual masks are also worn at the end of mourning as well as during death anniversaries.

The Awa believe that their traditional religious role is to reorder the spiritual forces after the world was left in a disordered state following the death of "their ancient ancestor"—the Nommo. It is their view that the spiritual realm was disrupted as a result of that death and resurrection in the form of the serpent ancestor Lebe.

By restoring order and transforming the spirits of the dead from being dangerous and destructive, the spirit can then be elevated to a position of honour, and regarded as a supernatural ancestor "well disposed towards the living." The ritual enhances the prestige of the deceased as well as his family.

== Kanaga mask ==
The Kanaga mask is one of seventy-eight kinds of masks used by the Awa. The mask is sculptured both in male and female form. The male version is the most numerous found during funeral and death anniversaries.
