= Youga Dogorou =

Coordinates: 14°31′47″N 3°13′13″W

Youga Dogorou is one of the Dogon villages in Mali. It is one of the Youga group of villages, the others being Youga Piri and Youga Na. The village is about 12km northeast of Banani.

== Status in Dogon religion ==
Youga Dogorou is where the sacred Sigi festival—one of the most important Dogon religious festivals—takes place every 60 years. The long procession of the Sigi starts and ends in Youga Dogorou. The last Sigi festival took place in 1967 and lasted until in 1973. The next one is due to take place in 2027 (as of 2020).

Like the other Youga villages, it is built on a small hill opposite the falaise. The village also host some well-preserved Tellem architecture.
