= John A. Hoyt =

American animal welfare campaigner

- Born: 30 March 1932; Marietta, Ohio
- Died: 15 April 2012 (aged 80); Fredericksburg
- Occupation: Animal welfare campaigner

John Arthur Hoyt (30 March 1932 – 15 April 2012) was an American Presbyterian minister and animal welfare campaigner. He was president and chief executive of the Humane Society of the United States from 1970 to 1996.

== Biography ==
Hoyt was born in Marietta, Ohio to Claremont and Margaret Hoyt. His father was a Baptist minister. He graduated in 1957 from Colgate Rochester Crozer Divinity School and became a Baptist minister. He was a senior minister of the First Presbyterian Church in Fort Wayne and was recruited to the Humane Society by a friend from the American Bible Society.

Hoyt was president and chief executive of the Humane Society from 1970 to 1996. He was known for expanding its stewardship of cats and dogs to also include laboratory animals, livestock, endangered fish and whales. Hoyt campaigned against blood sports, bullfighting, hunting and vivisection.

Hoyt was an early advocate of laws against organized dogfighting. In the 1980s, lobbying by the Humane Society influenced 40 states to adopt laws making deliberate cruelty to animals a felony rather than a misdemeanour. Under Hoyt's leadership the Humane Society grew from 100,000 to over 5 million members.

As an animal welfarist and not a rights advocate, Hoyt was criticized by animal rights organizations such as PETA. In a speech at the 1988 annual conference he refused to accept "censure for our willingness to accept compromise". In 1998, he delivered a Schweitzer Lecture on "The Essential Ethic".

His 1994 book Animals in Peril: How 'Sustainable Use' is Wiping Out the World's Wildlife was an attack on "sustainable use" of wildlife such as the international trade of wildlife. The book noted conflicts between animal welfare and conservation and how the international commercial trade of wild animals had led to devastating results including depletion of parrots, fish and whales and the failure to protect elephants. Hoyt advocated ecotourism to protect natural resources and wildlife and offer benefits to the local population.

In 2000, he was interviewed by animal rights writer Kim Stallwood.

== Personal life ==
Hoyt lived on a farm in Fredericksburg, with his family and many cats, dogs and horses. He married Gertrude; they had and four daughters. His daughter Peggy Hoyt is an animal welfare advocate and attorney who founded Animal Care Trust USA.

Hoyt stated that he had always loved animals, from the influence of his grandmother, a vegetarian who lived to age 106 and kept 40 pet sheep. He died from complications of progressive supranuclear palsy in Fredericksburg.

== Selected publications ==
- Do We Misuse Animals in School Science Projects? (1975)
- Animals in Peril: How "Sustainable Use" is Wiping out the World's Wildlife (1995)
