= Intertribal =

Intertribal and pantribal are terms indicating an activity, organization, or event that extends across American Indian tribal boundaries, is common to multiple tribes, or involves the actions of more than one tribe.

- American Indian Movement (AIM)
- Intertribal Council On Utility Policy & Council of Energy Resource Tribes
- Pan-Indianism
- Pantribal sodalities
- Pow wow, social gatherings held by many Native American and First Nations communities
- Tribal Council

== History of Intertribal Diplomacy ==
The Iroquois intertribal diplomacy inspired the Constitution of the United States Constitutional Convention.

Harvard Kennedy School has developed the Tribal Justice System that helps in intertribal diplomacy.
