= Masquerade in Mende culture =

Significance and purpose of Masquerade in Mende culture

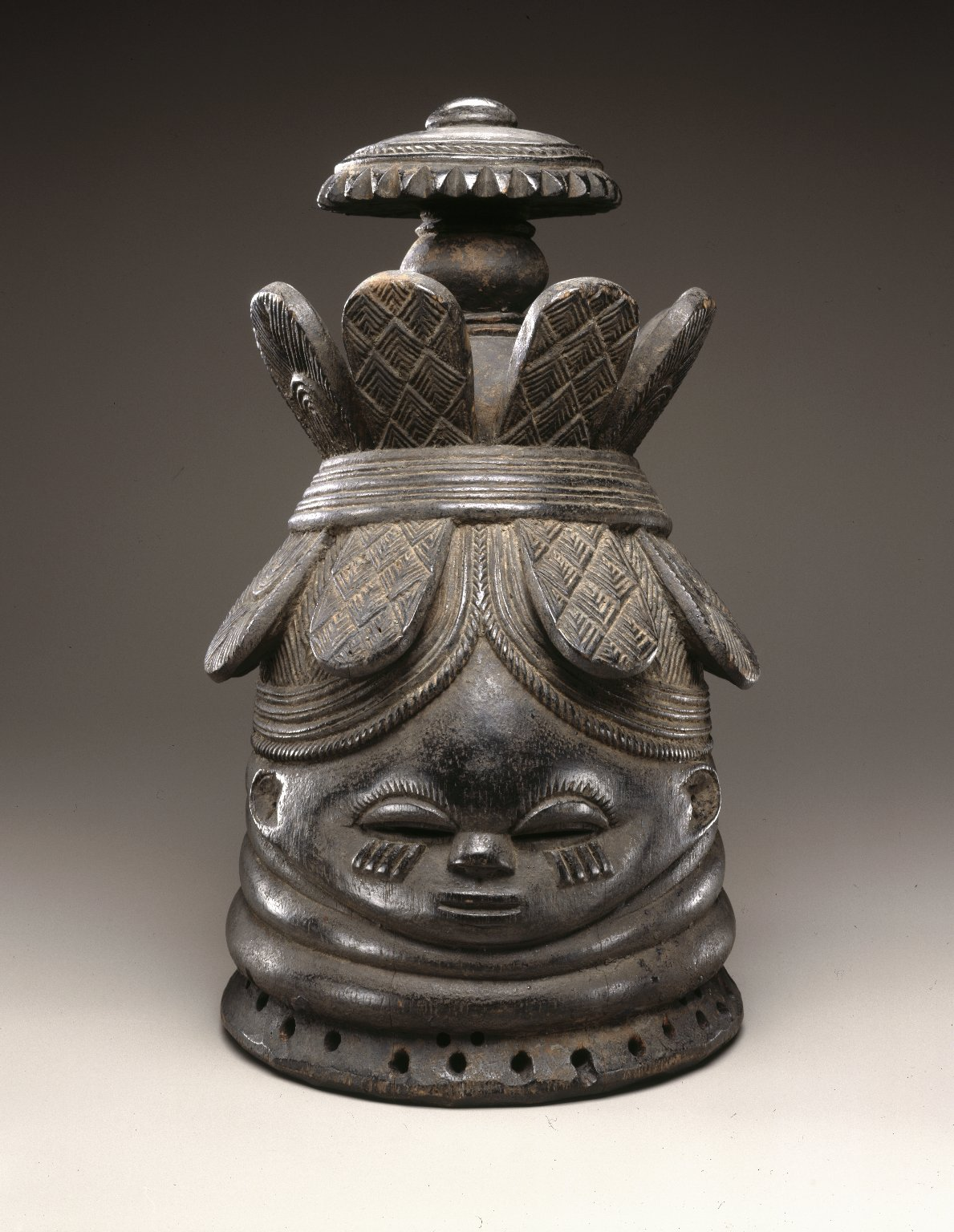
Helmet Mask (ndoli jowei) for Sande Society, from the collection of the Brooklyn Museum

Public masquerades play an extremely significant role in the life of the Mende people - one of the two largest ethnic groups in Sierra Leone.

Art historian Ruth Phillips writes that Mende masquerades "are a means of mediating between the general community and the medicine societies that are central to Mende social life. Through masking performances, the public is kept informed of important events which occur in the private domain and is enabled to witness and to share in rituals that transform the status of relatives and friends. The masquerades make visible the powerful medicines (Mende: haleisa, sing. hale) of these sodalities without compromising their essential mystery. Maskers personify and dramatize the powers of the medicines and elicit ritualized gestures of respect and tribute from the spectators. At the same time participants and audience drawn into a common sphere of performance, aesthetically heightened by theater, music and dance."

The Mende define the visual features and performance of each masker in relation to a standard set of masquerades. The occasions for each masquerade are fixed according to an annual calendar of ritual and secular events and, within a single celebration, there is a carefully orchestrated sequence of masquerades.

== Hale ==
Hale, meaning "medicine," is believed to be a material substance found in nature that has powerful inherent properties that the officials of Mende secret societies know how to manipulate. These "medicine societies" are the men's Poro society, and women's Sande society, and hale can also refer to these.

The maskers of a medicine society embodies the spirit (ngafa) as well as the power associated with its hale; the Mende refer to maskers by both of these terms. The standard set of Mende maskers includes about a dozen personalities embodying spirits of varying degrees of power and importance. The goboi and gbini of the Poro society, the sowei of the Sande society, and the njaye and humoi maskers belonging to the eponymous medicine societies.

== Types of maskers and masquerade ==
The maskers of the Sande and Poro societies are responsible for enforcing laws and are important symbolic presences in the rituals of initiation and in public ceremonies that mark the coronations and funerals of chiefs and society officials. Another group of maskers, including the male gongoli and the female gonde and samawa, are clownlike figures that feature in performances characterized by humor, satire and parody. These maskers are not true haleisia,

== Gbini ==
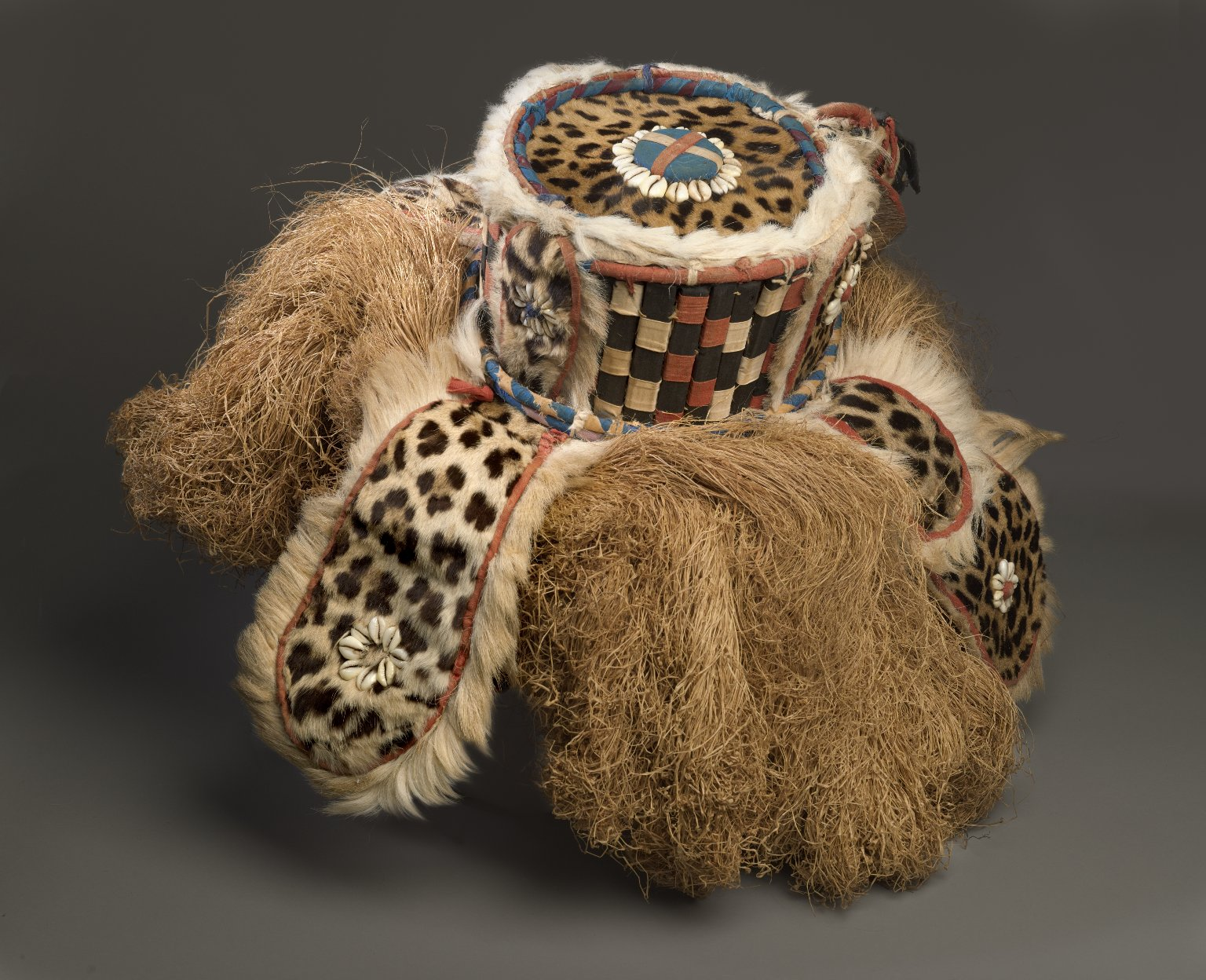
Gbini Mask, Mende (Wood, leopard skin, sheepskin, antelope skin, raffia fiber, cotton cloth, cotton string, cowry shells), from the collection of the Brooklyn Museum

Gbini is considered to be the most powerful of all Mende maskers. Gbini appears at the final "pulling" ceremony of Poro initiation for a son of the paramount chief and also at the coronation of funeral of a paramount chief. Because of its power, women must stand far back from gbini and if a woman accidentally touches it, she must be anointed with medicine immediately.

Gbini wears a large leopard skin which indicates its association with the paramount chief. The flat, round headpiece resembles the chief's crown. The headpiece is constructed of animal hide stretched over a bamboo framework. The hide is decorated with cowrie shells and black, white and red strips of cloth that are worked into a geometric pattern. At the center is a round mirror. Several flaps that are similarly decorated hang down from the base of the headpiece and overlap the raffia cape which covers much of the wearer's torso.

== Sowei ==
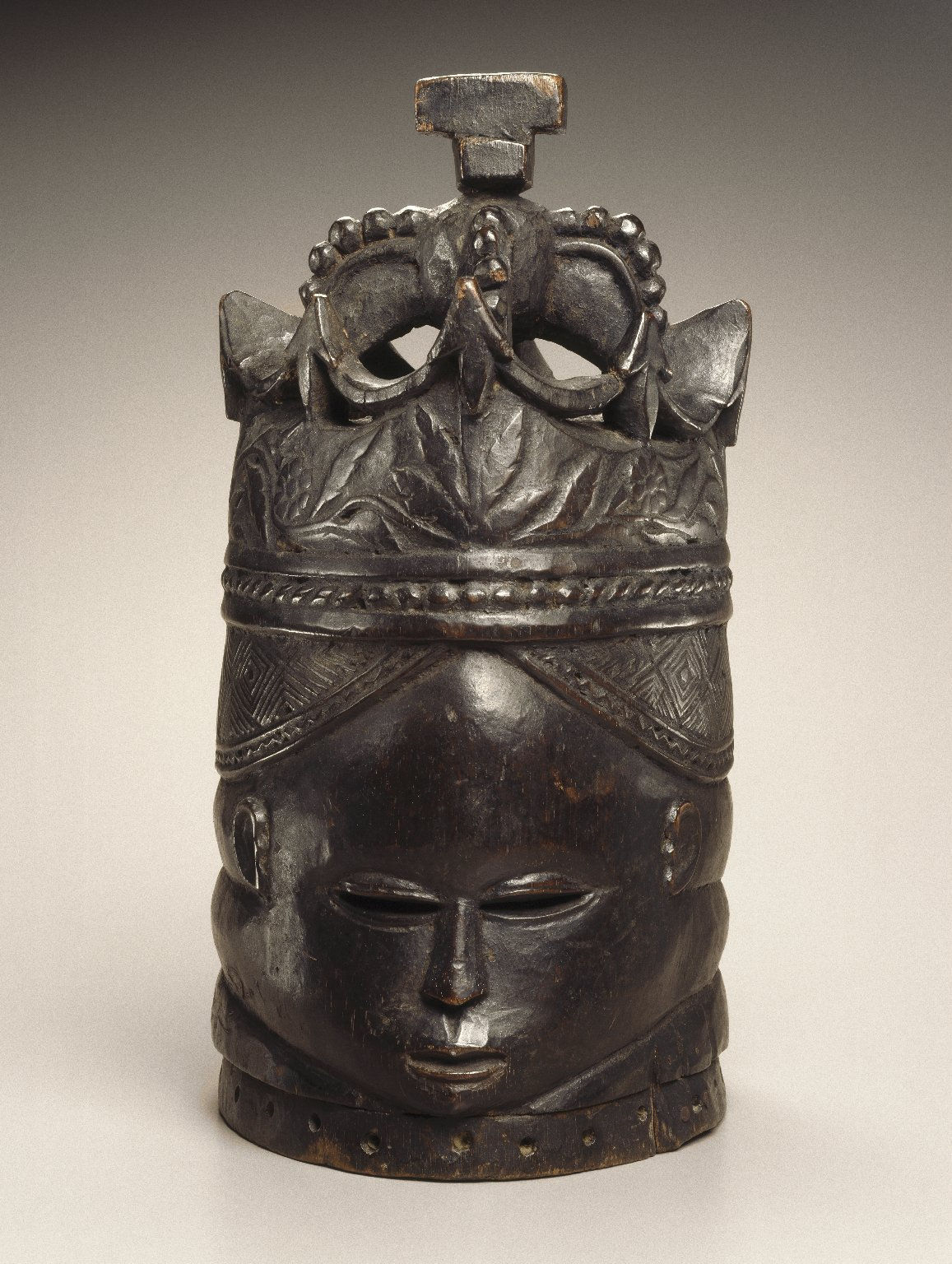
Helmet Mask (ndoli jowei) for Sande Society, from the collection of the Brooklyn Museum

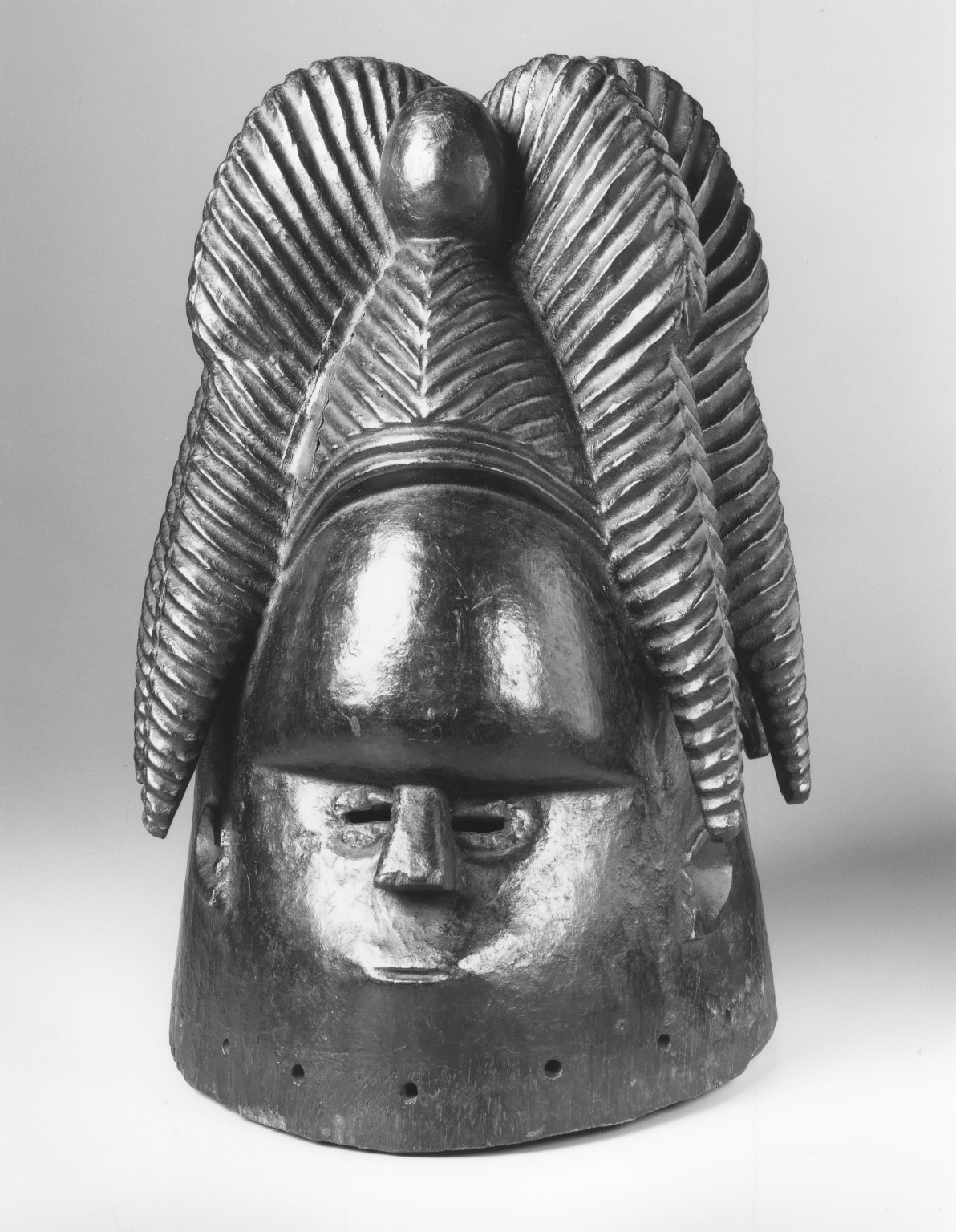
Helmet Mask (Zogbe) for Sande Society, from the collection of the Brooklyn Museum

The Sande society is one of the most influential patrons of the visual arts in West Africa. The Sande sowei masquerades promote and represent the images of women in specific ritual and festive contexts.

The ceremonies of the Sande society are the only occasions in Africa in which women customarily wear masks. Wooden masks worn during these public ceremonies, such as funerals or the installations of chiefs, are called sowo (sing. sowei) and represent the society's guardian spirit. The irreducible elements of sowei are a helmet form, lustrous blackness, beautifully arranged hair, downcast eyes, a closed mouth and an expression of inner spiritual concentration. The features of the mask illustrate the group's ideal of feminine beauty. The elegant hairstyles also symbolize the importance of social cooperation, since a woman needs the help of her friends to dress her hair.

The Mende honor outstanding carvers of sowei masks, which are typically men, with the name Sowo Gande. According to Philips, the Sowo Gande demonstrates virtuosity through "the triumphant conjuring of new forms which are recognizable variations of old forms."

According to the Mende, hojo- white clay or kaolin- stands for the concept of the Sande society. Symbolically, it reflects a lot of the characteristics the Sande treasure, such as purity and elusiveness. The Sande society daubs objects and people with hojo to indicate that they are under Sande's control and protection and are subject to the full authority of Sande law and punishment. At Sande ceremonies, the pure white of hojo and of the clothes worn by Sande officials is thrown into dramatic contrast with the blackness of sowei masks.

The most important participant in the sowei masquerade is the ndoli jowei, "the expert in dancing," the woman who dances in the mask in public and teaches dancing to the girls in the encampment.

An important part of initiation into the Sande society is the taking of a new name, which the girl herself usually chooses.
