= Zin (water spirits) =

Mythical water spirits

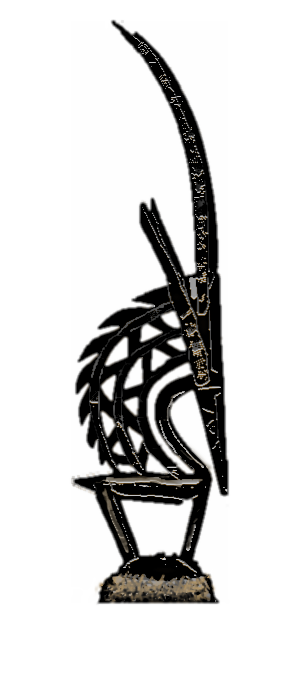

Zin are mythical water spirits that inhabit rivers and lakes in West Africa. The spirits are part of the mythology of the Songhai.
