= Sodality (social anthropology) =

Non-kin group organized for a specific purpose and frequently spanning villages or towns

In social anthropology, a sodality is a non-kin group organized for a specific purpose (economic, cultural, or other), frequently spanning villages or towns.

Sodalities are often based on common age or gender; all-male sodalities are more common than all-female. One aspect of a sodality is "representing a certain level of achievement in the society, much like the stages of an undergraduate's progress through college [university]".

In anthropological literature, the Sicilian Mafia was described as a sodality. Other examples include Maasai war camps, Crow and Cheyenne military associations, groups that resemble later Veterans of Foreign Wars or American Legion.

The term first received this meaning from Elman Service (drawing on the sodality vs. modality distinction used in some Christian churches), as part of his band-tribe-chiefdom-state model for the progression of political integration. It defined an organization that occurred across bands, and therefore was a part of a tribe, rather than a band, which was composed only of kin.

== See also ==
- Pantribal sodalities
- Secret society

== See also ==
- Social anthropology
