= Pantribal sodality =

Type of non-family social grouping

In anthropology, a pantribal sodality is a social grouping which is not determined by family membership (non-kin), and which extends across an entire tribe. Pantribal sodalities sometimes arise in areas where two or more different cultures overlap and are in regular contact. Such sodalities are especially likely to develop in the presence of warfare between tribes. Drawing their membership from different villages of the same tribe, such groups could mobilize men in many local groups for attack or retaliation against another tribe.

The best examples come from the Great Plains of North America and from tropical Africa. During the 18th and 19th centuries, Native American societies of the Great Plains of the United States and Canada experienced a rapid growth of pantribal sodalities. This development reflected an economic change that followed the spread of horses, which had been reintroduced to the Americas by the Spanish, to the states between the Rocky Mountains and the Mississippi River. Many Plains Indian societies changed their adaptive strategies because of the horse.
