= Marcel Griaule =

French author and anthropologist

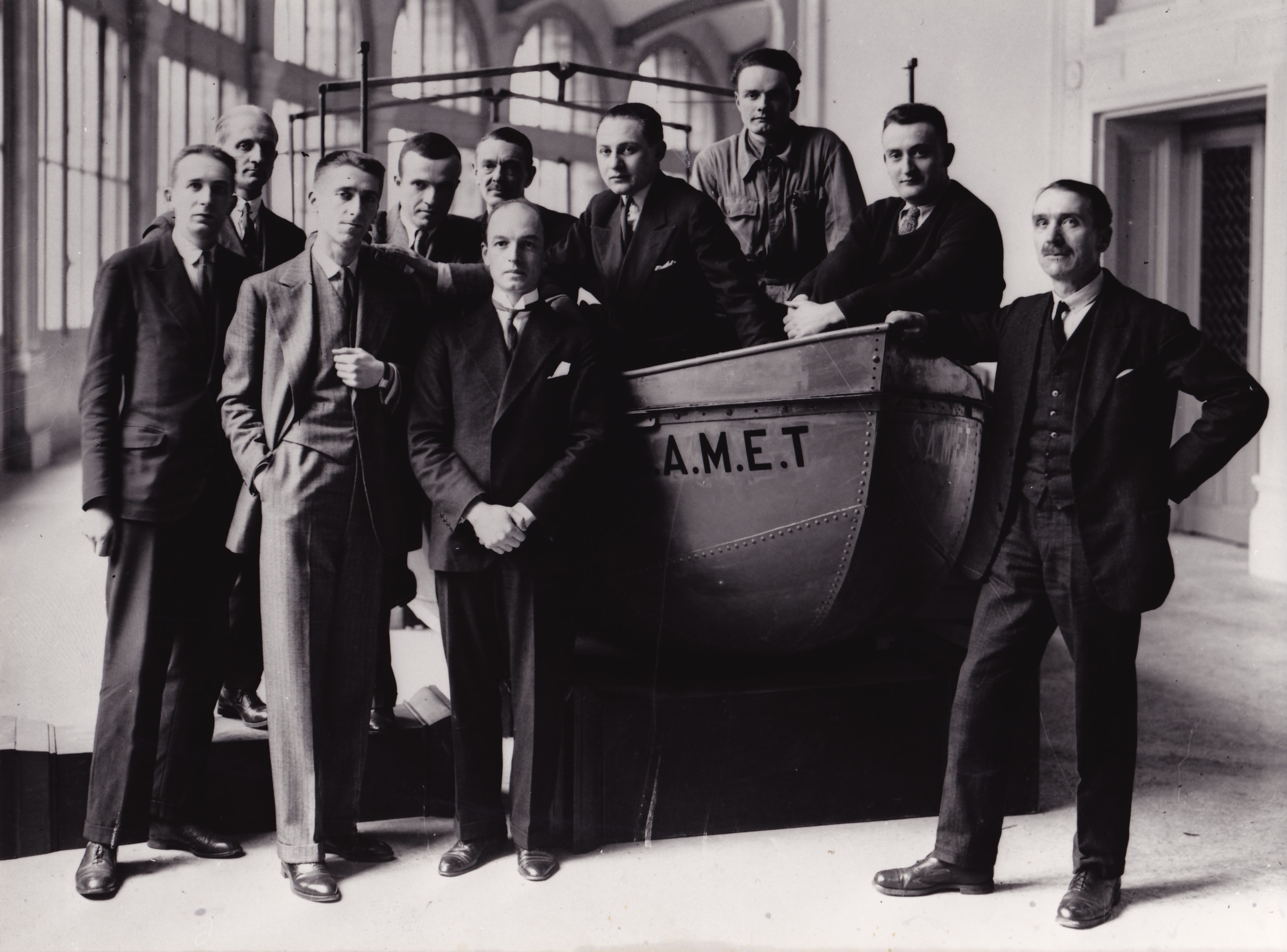
Members of the Mission Dakar-Djibouti in the Musée d'Ethnographie du Trocadéro, Paris, 1931. Left to right: André Schaeffner, Jean Mouchet, Georges Henri Rivière, Michel Leiris, le baron Outomsky, Marcel Griaule, Éric Lutten, Jean Moufle, Gaston-Louis Roux, Marcel Larget

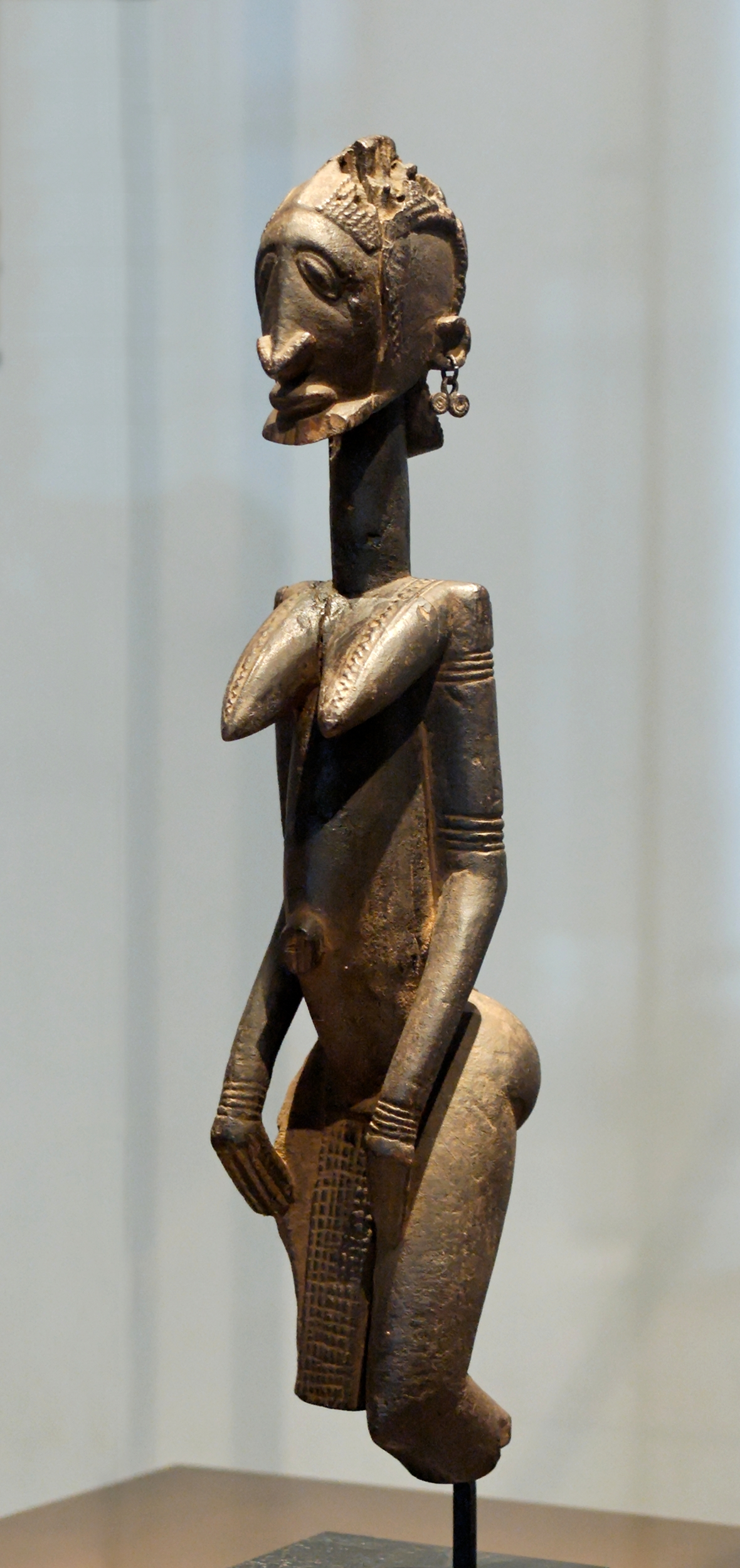
Dogon sculpture (Louvre)

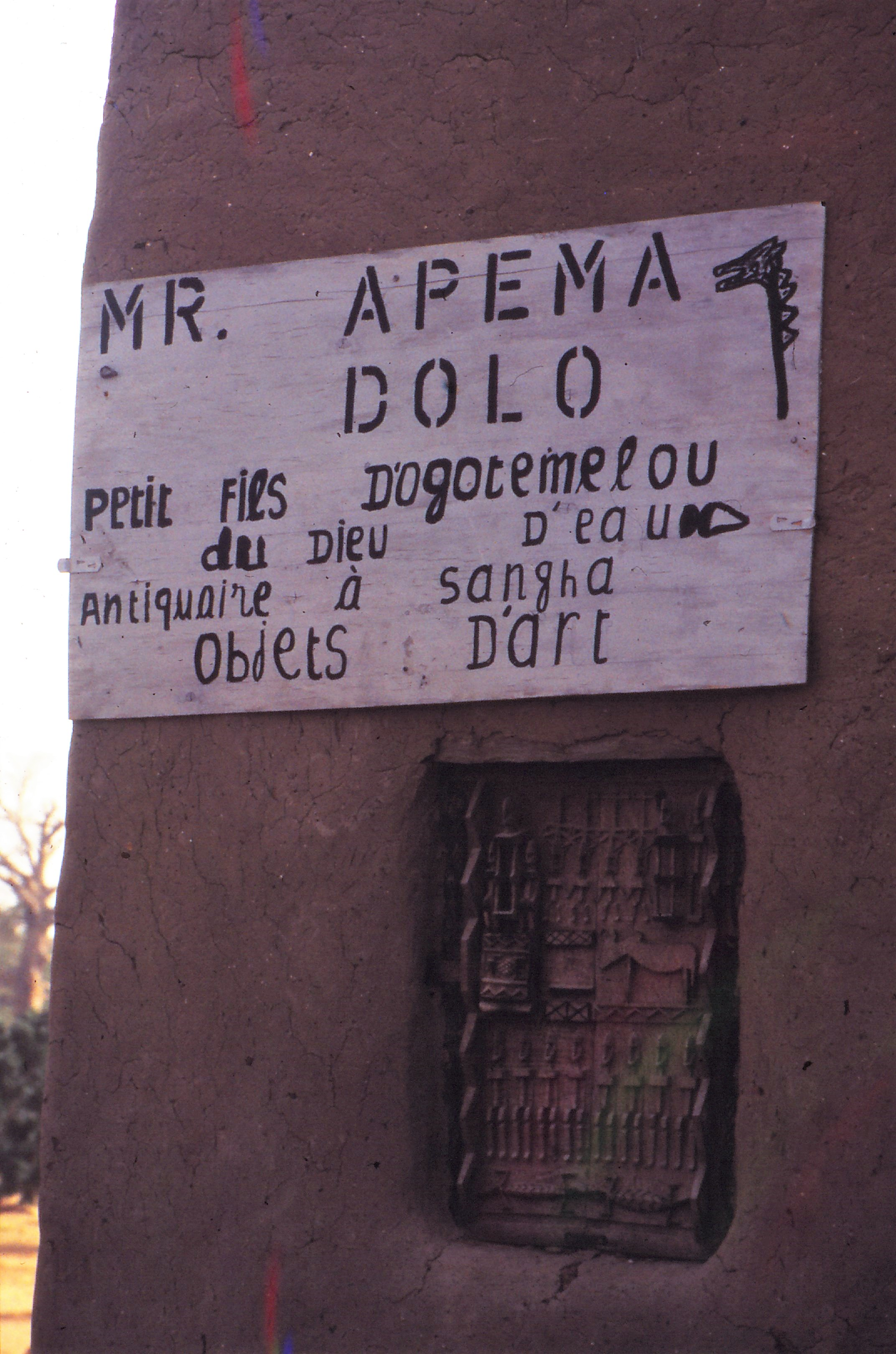
An art dealer in Sangha, Mali professes to be the grandson of Ogotemmeli, known from Griaules publications, 1990

Marcel Griaule (French: [maʁsɛl ɡʁijol]; 16 May 1898 – 23 February 1956) was a French author and anthropologist known for his studies of the Dogon people of West Africa, and for pioneering ethnographic field studies in France. He worked together with Germaine Dieterlen and Jean Rouch on African subjects. His publications number over 170 books and articles for scholarly journals.

== Biography ==
Born in Aisy-sur-Armançon, Griaule received a good education and was preparing to become an engineer and enrolled at the prestigious Lycée Louis-le-Grand when in 1917 at the end of World War I he volunteered to become a pilot in the French Air Force.

In 1920 he returned to university, where he attended the lectures of Marcel Mauss and Marcel Cohen. Intrigued by anthropology, he gave up plans for a technical career. In 1927 he received a degree from the École Nationale de Langues Orientales, where he concentrated on Amharic and Ge'ez.

Between 1928 and 1933 Griaule participated in two large-scale ethnographic expeditions—one to Ethiopia and the ambitious Dakar to Djibouti expedition which crossed Africa. On the latter expedition he first visited the Dogon, the ethnic group with whom he would be forever associated.

In 1933 he received a diploma from the École Pratique des Hautes Études in religion.

Throughout the 1930s Griaule and his student Germaine Dieterlen undertook several group expeditions to the Dogon area in Mali. During these trips Griaule pioneered the use of aerial photography, surveying, and teamwork to study other cultures. In 1938 he produced his dissertation and received a doctorate based on his Dogon research.

With the outbreak of World War II Griaule was drafted again in the French Air Force and after the war he served as the inaugural professor of the first chair of anthropology at the Paris-Sorbonne University.

He died in 1956 in Paris.

Griaule is remembered for his work with the blind hunter Ogotemmeli and his elaborate exegeses of Dogon myth ( fr )—(including the Nommo) and ritual. His study of Dogon masks remains one of the fundamental works on the topic. A number of anthropologists are highly critical of his work and argue that his claims about Sirius and his elaborate accounts of cosmic eggs and mystic vibrations do not accurately reflect Dogon belief.

Griaule is the father of anthropologist Geneviève Calame-Griaule (See fr: Geneviève Calame-Griaule).

== Selected works ==
- Burners of men: Modern Ethiopia. Lippincott, 1935. (The story of an expedition into the interior of Abyssinia in the early 1930s; a time when Abyssinia was trying to fight off Mussolini. The book was awarded the 1934 Prix Gringoire.)
- Abyssinian Journey. 1935. (Travel account of an ethnographic and linguistic study on behalf of the French Government in the 1930s.)
- Masques dogons, Institut d'Ethnologie, 1938
- Jeux dogons, Institut d'Ethnologie, 1938
- Les Saô légendaires, Gallimard, 1943.
- Folk art of black Africa, 1950.
- Signes Graphiques Soudanais, Hermann et Cie Editeurs, 1951.
- Conversations with Ogotemmeli: An Introduction to Dogon Religious Ideas. 1965. (many reprints) ISBN 0-19-519821-2, originally published in 1948 as Dieu d'Eau.
- with Germaine Dieterlen: The Pale Fox, originally published as Le Renard Pâle, Institut d'Ethnologie, 1965.
- Methode de l'Etnographie, Presses Universitaires de France, Paris, 1957. (There's Spanish translation: El Método de la Etnografía, Nova, Buenos Aires, 1969.)

== See also ==
- Dogon people
- Germaine Dieterlen
- Jean Rouch
- Laird Scranton

== Sources ==
- Isabelle Fiemeyer, Marcel Griaule, citoyen dogon, Actes Sud 2004
- Laird Scranton, "Revisiting Griaule's Dogon Cosmology." Anthropology News, Vol. 48, No 4 (April 2007)
