= Amma (deity) =

God worshiped in the Dogon religion

Amma is an African tribal deity – the supreme creator god in the Dogon religion. The Dogon story of the creation of the world relates that the sky god Amma mated with the earth goddess, and because Amma was prevented from joining the goddess's clitoris in the form of a giant termite mound, he produced only an imperfect offspring – a desert fox or jackal – and therefore eventually removed the termite mound. Leaving the earth, he instituted the religious ritual of female circumcision. After removing the termite mound, the god Amma with the earth goddess continued procreating and begat humans. Duality is central to Dogon religion, the heavenly forces also have a dual character: the supreme god Amma has androgynous characteristics. The birth of twins is celebrated among the Dogon with a special religious ritual, as twins refer to the original dual structure of creation and to the harmony between earthly and heavenly.

== Creation myth of twins ==
Key figures in Dogon religion are the twins Nummo and Nommo, primal spirits of Dogon ancestors, sometimes seen as deities. These are hermaphroditic water creatures, seen similarly to water deities (to-vodun) in West African vodun; they can be depicted with a human body and a fish tail. Nommo is supposed to be the first living creature created by the supreme god Amma. Shortly after his creation, Nommo spawned into four pairs of twins, with one pair defying the order established by creator Amma. To restore order, the god Amma sacrificed another creature, whose body he cut up and scattered throughout creation. A shrine for the god Amma was to be built at each place where a fragment of the body landed.

The cult of the god Amma – like the entire Dogon religion – is closely tied to the Bandiagara cliff where the Dogon live. The cult of the god Amma is geographically defined by this cliff, it is not practiced elsewhere. The Bandiagara cliff is a sandstone terrain fault approximately 150 km long, reaching a height of up to 500 m in some places. The Dogon inhabit mud villages built on the upper edge of the cliff, villages directly attached to the cliff at its lower edge, but also at various heights in the wall, also villages scattered under the cliff and a labyrinth of caves right in the cliff. The architecture of the villages and the religiously motivated urban arrangement of mud houses centered on the hogon priestly building is unique in the context of the whole of Africa. The Dogon language forms an independent branch of the Niger-Congo language family and is not closely related to any other language.
