= Persée (web portal) =

French digital library

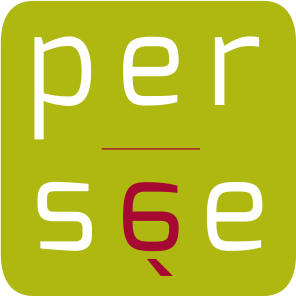
- Website type: open access science portal
- Headquarters: Lyon, France
- Owners: MESR; Université de Lyon; CNRS; ENS de Lyon
- Editor: Gabrielle Richard
- Website: www.persee.fr
- Commercial: no
- Launched: 2005

Persée is a digital library of open access, mostly French-language scholarly journals, established by the Ministry of National Education of France. The website launched in 2005. The resource is maintained by the École normale supérieure de Lyon, French National Centre for Scientific Research, and University of Lyon.

It is one of the largest francophone portals dedicated to human and social sciences, with about 600 000 documents freely available.

== See also ==
- List of journals in Persee.fr (fr)
- Open access journal
- List of open access bibliographic databases (fr)

== Bibliography ==
- Open Access Rules in France: Persée, érudit, and revues.org. USA: Villanova University. 2012 – via Falvey Library Blogs: History & Political Science.
- Persée Digital Library (PDF). Society of American Archivists. 2014.
