= Rosalind Hackett =

American historian

Rosalind I. J. Hackett is a British-born American historian, formerly a Distinguished Humanities Professor at the University of Tennessee from 2003 to 2008. She was born and spent her early life in England.

She was granted an Honorary Chieftaincy in Nigeria for her research on religion in Nigeria and her work with the African Consortium for Law and Religion Studies.
