= Hogon =

Spiritual leader in Dogon villages

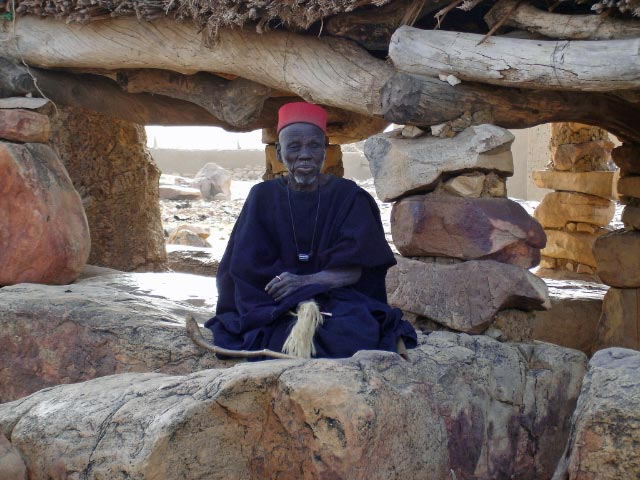
A Hogon, in Mali

A hogon is a spiritual leader in a Dogon village who plays an important role in Dogon religion.

== The life of a hogon ==
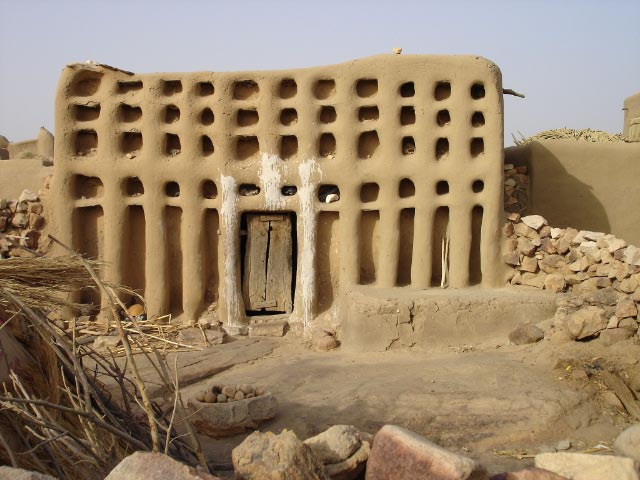
A hogon house

A hogon is a religious figure as well as a temporal authority; the hogon may be hereditary or may be chosen from among the village elders—custom varies from place to place. The hogon is always a man. After being chosen, a hogon must pass through several months without washing or shaving. After initiation, he wears a red cap, and a pearl bracelet. Hogon live alone and should be celibate, but a village girl may act as a maid. Nobody should touch the hogon.

== Ritual ==
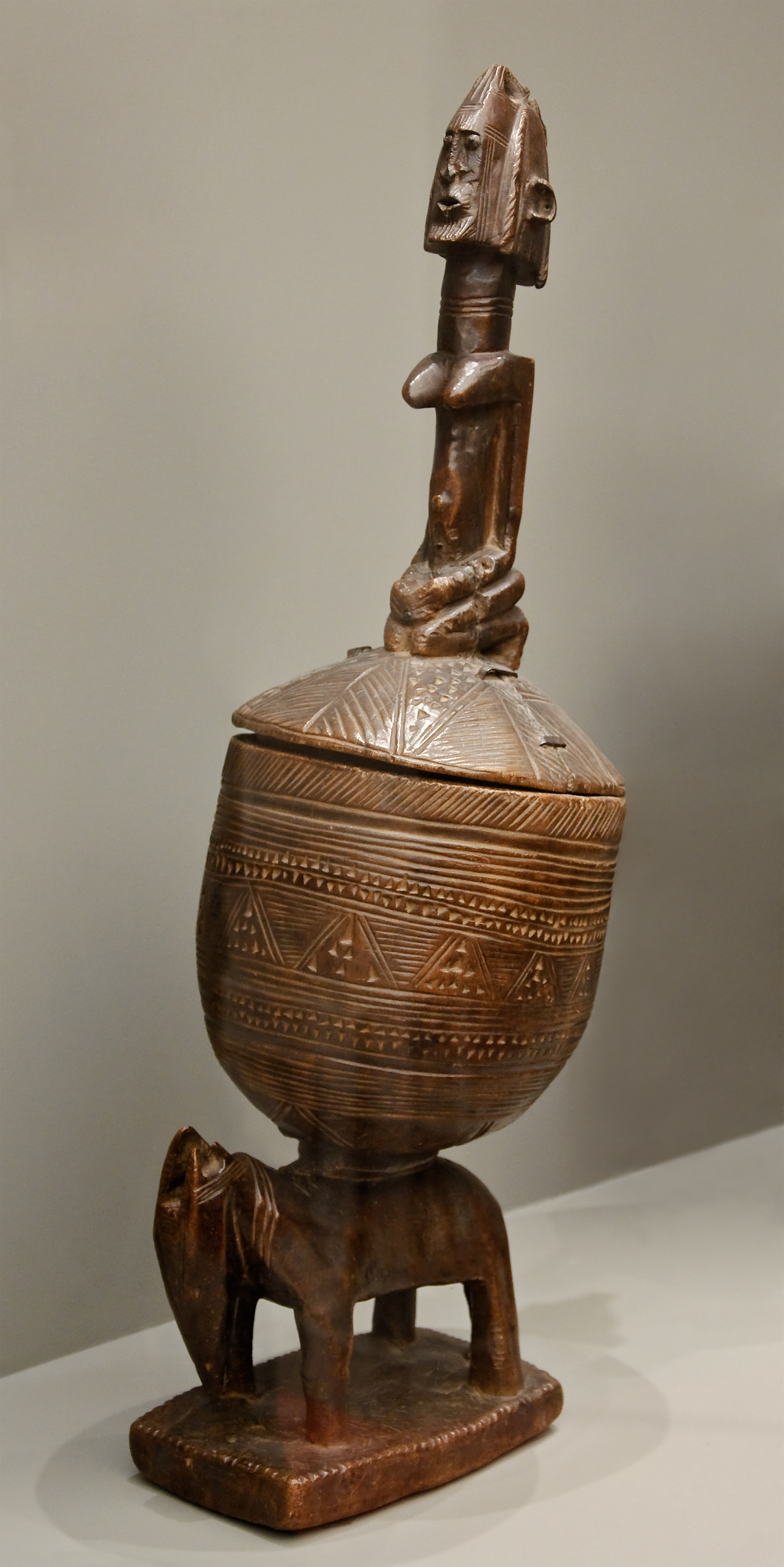
A Hogon cup (Ogo banya), used in particular during the Hogon's enthronement ceremony. Musée du quai Branly, Paris, France.

The hogon has a key role in village rituals and in ensuring fertility and germination.

The hogon is central to a wide range of fertility and marriage rituals, which are closely related to Dogon origin myths.

The hogon may conduct rituals in the Sanctuaire de Binou, a special building the door of which is blocked with rocks.

== Creation myth ==
According to legend, the first hogon, Lebe, was descended from a nommo. He was eaten by another nommo, and their spirits merged; the nommo vomited out a new Lebe (part human and part spiritual), plus copious liquid which shaped the landscape.

== See also ==
- Saltigue
- Traditional African religions
- Animism
- Shaman
- Awa Society
