= Banani, Mali =

Banani
- Village
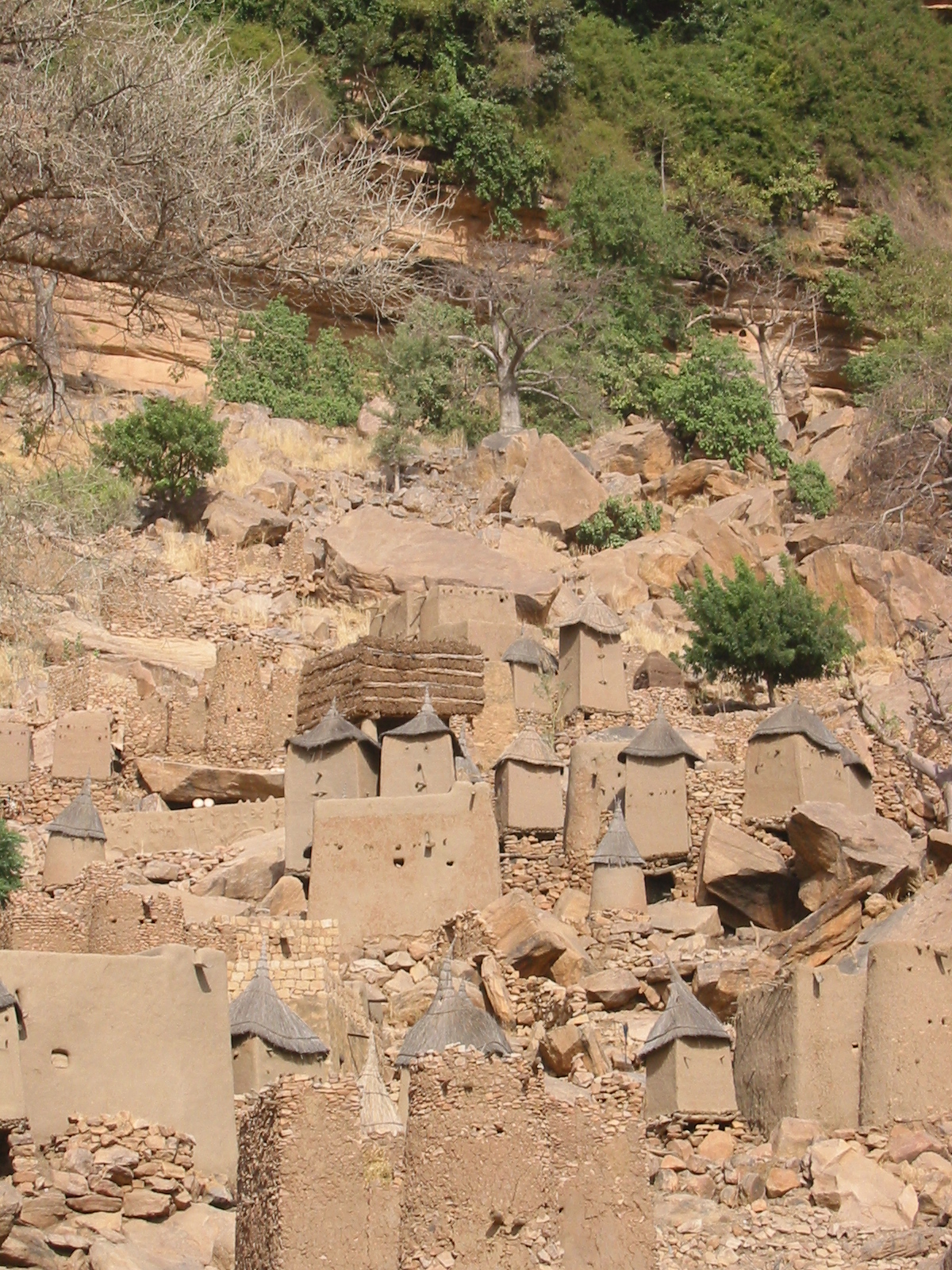

- Location in Mali
- Coordinates: 14°27′N 3°17′W
- Country: Mali
- Region: Mopti Region
- Time zone: UTC+0 (GMT)

Banani is a village in Mali, populated by the Dogon people. Banani village is situated at the base and on the lower slopes of a mountain ridge. There is a steep road leading up to Sangha. Toro So is spoken in the village.
