= Germaine Dieterlen =

French anthropologist (1903–1999)

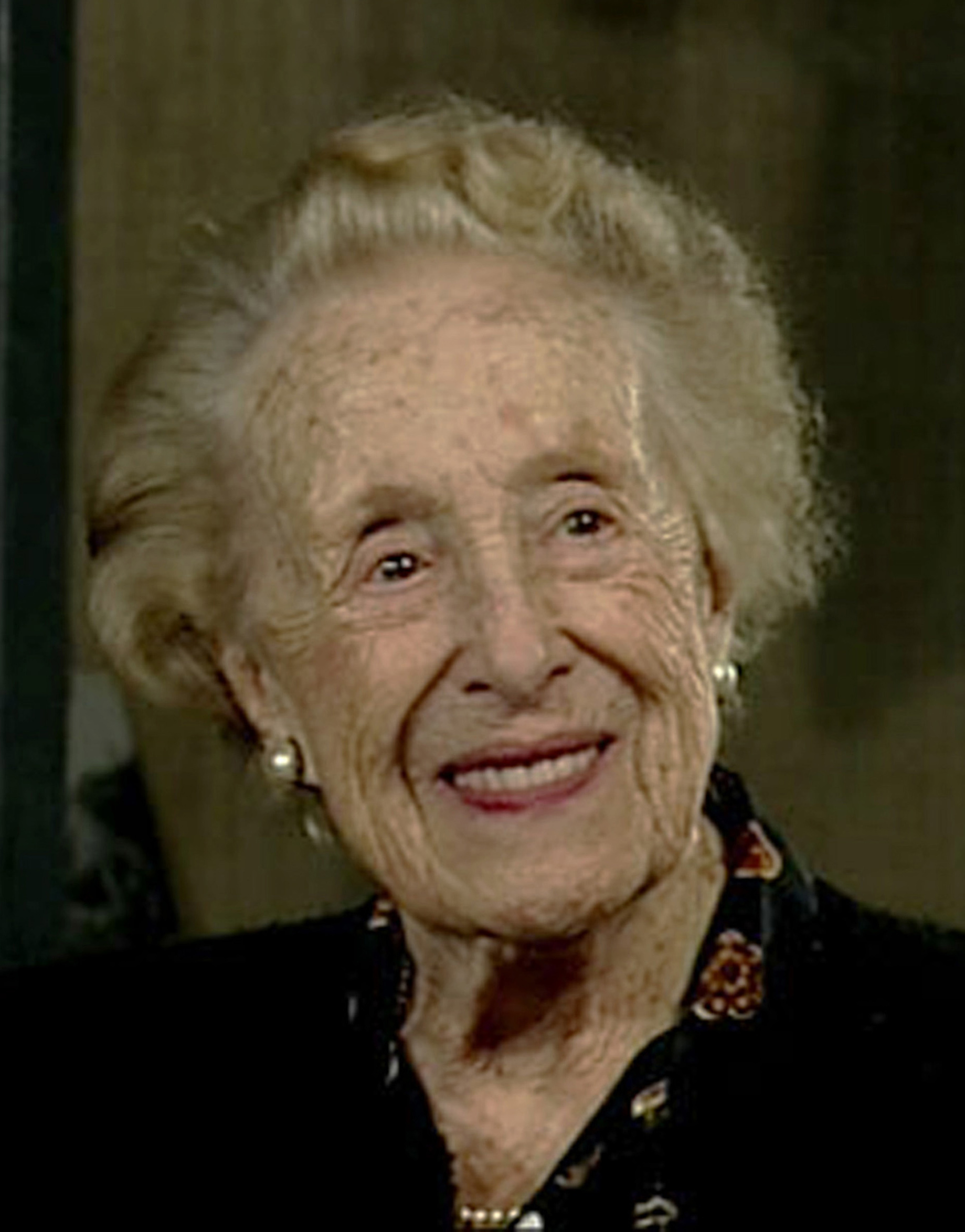
Dieterlen in the French documentary film Paroles by Jean Rouch, 1998

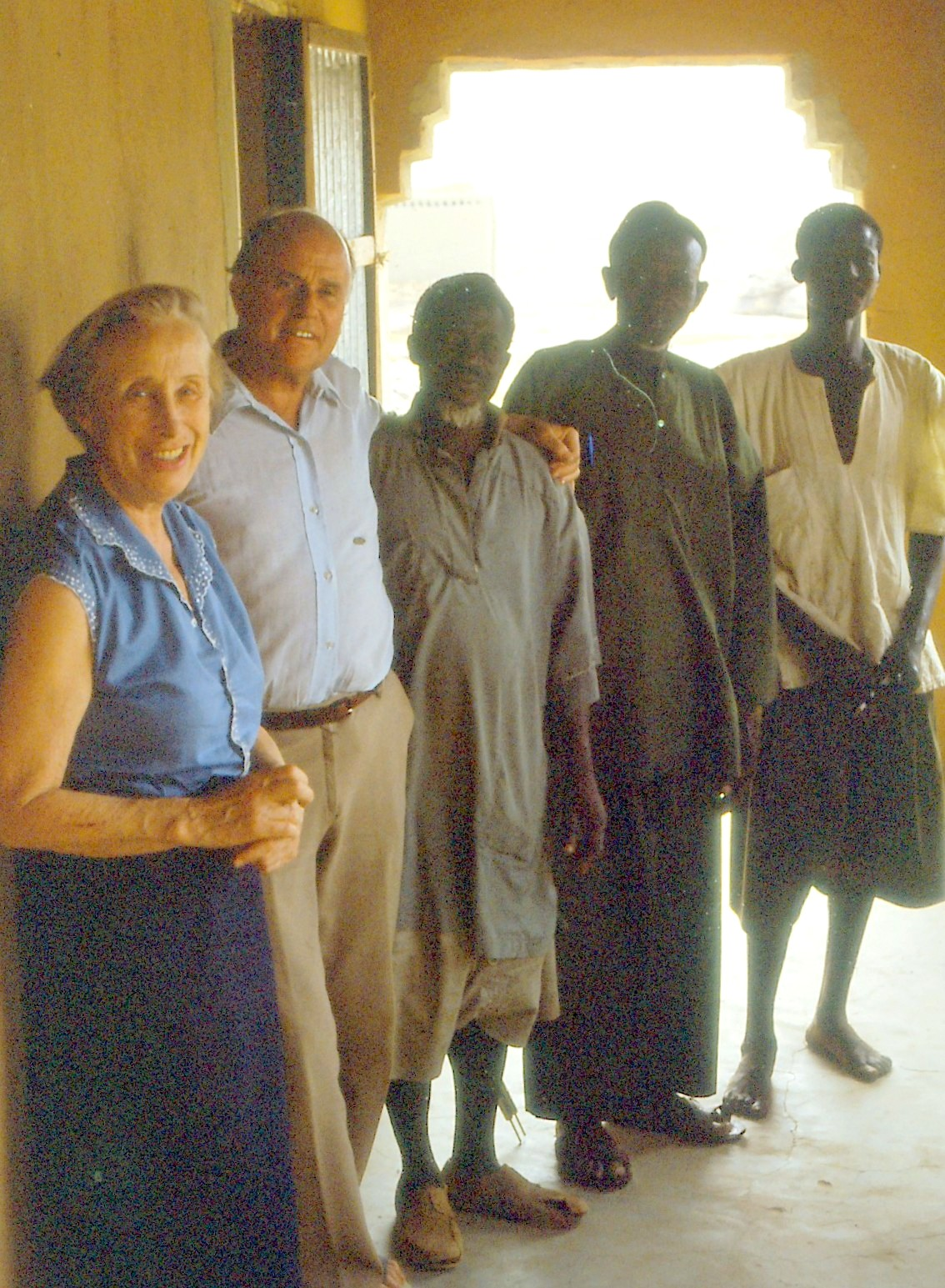
The French anthropologists Germaine Dieterlen (1903–1999) and Jean Rouch (1917–2004) with three of their local male informants, Sangha, Mali, 1980.

Germaine Dieterlen (15 May 1903 in Valleraugue – 13 November 1999 in Paris) was a French anthropologist. She was a student of Marcel Mauss, worked with noted French anthropologists Marcel Griaule (1898-1956) and Jean Rouch, wrote on a large range of ethnographic topics and made pioneering contributions to the study of myths, initiations, techniques (particularly "descriptive ethnography"), graphic systems, objects, classifications, ritual and social structure.

She is most noted for her work among the Dogon and the Bambara of Mali, having lived with them for over twenty years, often in collaboration with Marcel Griaule, with whom she wrote the book The Pale Fox (1965).

== Themes ==
Some of the main themes in her work concentrate on the notions of sacred kingship, the position of the first born, relationships between maternal uncles and nephews, division of labor, marriage, and the status of the rainmaker in Dogon society. Because each episode of the rite is enacted only once every sixty years, Dieterlen's documentation of the Sigui cycle was thought to allow the Dogon themselves to see and interpret the entire sequence of rites which they had heretofore only observed in part.

== Research ==
Dieterlen began her ethnographic research in Bandiagara, Mali, in 1941. Perhaps most controversially, Dieterlen was criticized by her peers for her publications with Griaule on Dogon astronomy, which professed an ancient knowledge of the existence of a dwarf white star, Sirius B also called the Dog Star, invisible to the naked eye. This ancient indigenous knowledge (the Nommo) and the supposition that extraterrestrials might have been in contact with the Dogon was popularized by Robert K. G. Temple in his book The Sirius Mystery (1976) and Tom Robbins Half Asleep in Frog Pajamas (1995).

Skeptic and space journalist James Oberg in his investigation of the Dogon mystery in 1982 could neither support nor disprove Griaules questionable stories about Dogon astronomy. Dutch anthropologist W.E.A. van Beek, who spent seven years with the Dogon, could not reproduce Griaule's and Dieterlen's findings in the field. He seriously critiqued the research methods of Griaule and Dieterlen and explained their results (Dogon Restudied 1991).

Daughter and colleague of Marcel Griaule Geneviève Calame-Griaule on the French language Wikipedia, defended her father, dismissing van Beek's criticism.

== Academic career ==
Dieterlen also served as a Director of Studies at Ecole Pratique des Hautes Etudes at the Sorbonne in Paris, was a founding member of the Centre National de la Recherche Scientifique (CNRS), and a President of the Committee on Ethnographic Film (founded by Jean Rouch, with whom she worked and made important ethnographic films). An "hommage" collection published in 1978 (Systèmes de signes: Textes réunis en hommage à Germaine Dieterlen) included essays by Meyer Fortes and Claude Lévi-Strauss. Dieterlen also worked with other noted ethnographic filmmakers like Marcel Griaule. Mary Douglas reviewed the contributions made by Dieterlen to French anthropology in Dogon Culture – Profane and Arcane (1968) and If the Dogon ... (1975). The Dogon gave Germaine Dieterlene the name of Madame l'Éternelle (The Eternal Lady) in memory of the work she did together with Marcel Griaule.
