= Pascal James Imperato =

American epidemiologist and academic

Pascal James Imperato (born January 13, 1937) is a doctor and professor of tropical medicine and public health and an author on diverse subjects including public health, traditional medicine, African art, history and science fiction. Imperato is the founding Dean and Distinguished Service Professor of the School of Public Health at the SUNY Downstate Medical Center in Brooklyn, New York.

== Education ==
Pascal gained his primary medical degree from the State University of New York and a Master's degree in public health and Tropical Medicine from the Tulane University School of Public Health and Tropical Medicine.

== Books ==
- Doctor in the Land of the Lion (1964)
- Bwana Doctor (1967)
- African Folk Medicine: Practices and Beliefs of the Bambara and Other Peoples (1971)
- A Wind in Africa: A Story of Modern Medicine in Mali (1975)
- What to do about the flu (1976)
- Sourcebook on health sciences librarianship (1977)
- Medical Detective (1979)
- Buffoons, Queens, and Wooden Horsemen: The Dyo and Gouan Societies of the Bambara of Mali (1983)
- The Administration of a Public Health Agency: A Case Study of the New York City Department of Health (1983)
- Acceptable Risks (1985)
- Mali: A Search For Direction (1989)
- Acquired Immunodeficiency Syndrome: Current Issues and Scientific Studies (1989) (Editor)
- Quest For The Jade Sea: Colonial Competition Around An East African Lake (1998)
- They Married Adventure: The Wandering Lives of Martin and Osa Johnson (1999)
- Over Land and Sea (2000)
- Legends, Sorcerers and Lizards: Door Locks of the Bamana of Mali (2001)
- Surfaces: Color, Substances, and Ritual Applications on African Sculpture (2006) (Editor)
- African Mud Cloth: The Bogolanfini Art Tradition of Gneli Traore of Mali (2006)
- Historical Dictionary of Mali (2008)
- The Bee (2011) Science fiction novel
