= Timothy Insoll =

British archaeologist and academic (born 1967)

Timothy Insoll OBE FBA FSA
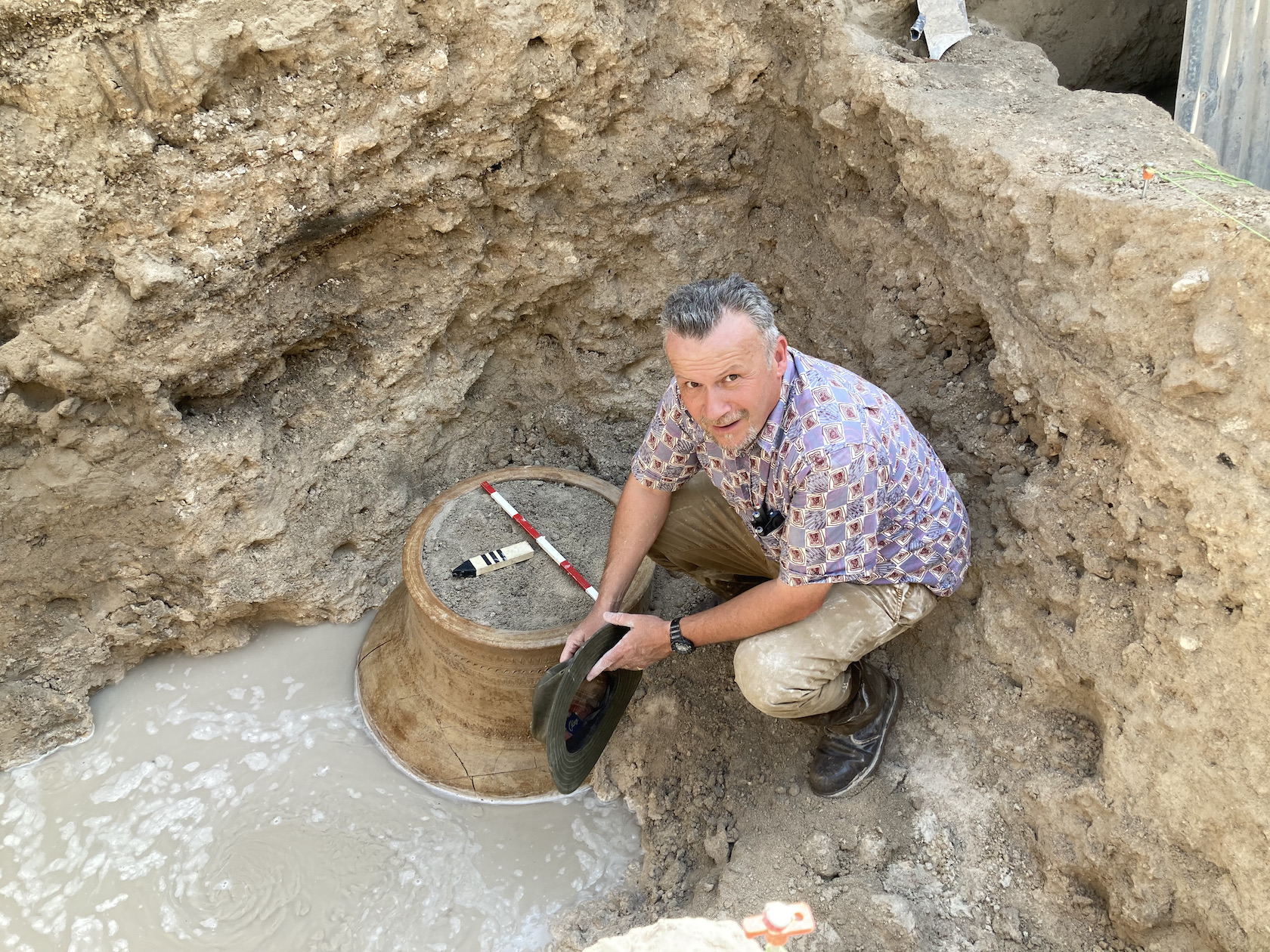
- Insoll in Bahrain, November 2021
- Born: 1967 (age 58–59)
- Occupation: Archaeologist
- Known for: Excavation and research in sub-Saharan Africa and Bahrain

Academic background
- Education: University of Sheffield; St John's College, Cambridge
- Thesis: Islam, archaeology and history, a complex relationship: the Gao Region (Mali) ca.AD 900–1250 (1995)

Academic work
- Discipline: Archaeology
- Sub-discipline: Archaeology of religions and rituals; Archaeology of Islam in Africa; African indigenous religions
- Institutions: University of Cambridge; University of Manchester; University of Exeter

Timothy Alexander Insoll (born 1967) is a British archaeologist and Africanist and Islamic Studies scholar. Since 2016 he has been Al-Qasimi Professor of African and Islamic Archaeology at the University of Exeter. He is also founder and director of the Centre for Islamic Archaeology. Previously he was at the Department of Archaeology at the University of Manchester (1999–2016).

His primary research specialism is in the archaeology of Islam and indigenous religions in sub-Saharan Africa. His research has focused on the archaeological indicators of Islam, as well as indigenous beliefs associated with concepts such as ancestral veneration and sacrifice. He has engaged with STEM approaches throughout his research, and works closely with historical, ethnographic, and epigraphic materials. He has particular interests in the archaeological analysis of beads and bead materials.

He has curated several exhibitions and worked on theoretical approaches to the archaeological study of rituals and religions. He has also led research projects in Mali, Ghana, Ethiopia, and Bahrain, and completed other field and museum-based projects in Eritrea, India, Pemba Island, and Uganda.

== Personal life ==
He is married to the archaeologist Rachel MacLean.

== Academic career ==
Insoll undertook his undergraduate studies in archaeology at the University of Sheffield from 1989 to 1992, and took part in a training excavation at Cill Donnain on the island of South Uist. He went on to work on his PhD at St John's College, University of Cambridge from 1992 to 1995. Having completed his doctorate, Insoll became a research fellow at St John's College, University of Cambridge (1995–1998), where he was also a tutor in Archaeology and Anthropology. Appointed as a lecturer at Manchester in 1999, he was promoted to the position of senior lecturer, and then reader in 2004, being awarded a personal chair in 2005, where he was professor of African and Islamic archaeology. In April 2016 he was appointed to an Al-Qasimi Chair in the Institute of Arab and Islamic Studies at the University of Exeter.

Insoll completed field research in Pemba Island (Tanzania, 1991), Gao and Timbuktu (Mali, 1993, 1996), Rakai (Uganda, 1994), the Dahlak Islands (Eritrea, 1996), Khambhat (India, 2000), Muharraq and Bilad al-Qadim (Bahrain, 2001 to present), the Tong Hills and Yikpabongo (Ghana, 2004–2011), and Harar and Harlaa, Ethiopia (2014–2020).

Two of his books have been translated: The Archaeology of Islam into Turkish (2007) and Persian (Farsi) (2022), and Archaeology, Ritual, Religion into Persian (2013).

He co-teaches the undergraduate Introduction to Islamic Archaeology and Regions and Empires in Islamic Archaeology modules, and contributes on Islamic and African archaeology to the MA module Themes in Archaeological Theory and Practice. Other undergraduate modules he has taught are Introduction to African Archaeology, Research Issues in African Archaeology, and the MA unit, The Archaeology of Rituals and Religions.

== Research ==
Insoll's initial archaeological research was completed for an undergraduate dissertation on Chinese ceramics collected during surveys in Ras Mkumbuu and Mtambwe Mkuu, Pemba Island, Tanzania. This examined the typology, chronology, distribution and use of these ceramics within the context of western Indian Ocean trade.

From 1992 to 1995 Insoll completed his PhD on trans-Saharan trade and Islamisation in the city of Gao and its surrounding region in eastern Mali, research that was continued in 1996 as part of a post-doctoral fellowship. This provided archaeological confirmation for the pre-Islamic occupation of the city and contributed to the dismantling of the ‘Arab stimulus’ hypothesis where indicators of complexity were thought to be externally derived. Instead, long-distance trans-Saharan trade networks were found to have been added onto earlier regional ones. Islam was adopted within an indigenous context and due to an Islamisation process staggered over several centuries. The discovery of a cache of approximately 70 hippopotamus tusks suggested elephant ivory was not the sole source of ivory used in the medieval Islamic world. Source analysis (LA-ICP-MS) of gold indicated that coins being minted by the Almoravid dynasty in North Africa were struck from the same West African gold. Subsequent similar source analysis of carnelian beads, the first in-depth study to be completed on this material using Laser Ablation Inductively coupled Mass Spectrometry, indicated that some were probably of Indian origin, and others of West African provenance. An extensive survey of carnelian sources was completed in Gujarat (2000) in partnership with Prof. Kuldeep Bhan of MS University, Vadodara, to facilitate this analysis. The results of the Gao research were published in two monographs, many other publications, and presented in an exhibition, Medieval Trading Cities of the Niger: Gao and Timbuktu, in the John Addis Gallery at the British Museum (1998–1999), and subsequently formed part of the permanent display in the Musée Nationale, Bamako, Mali.

Also, in the 1990s Insoll completed a series of smaller research projects to assess Islamic archaeological remains in varied parts of sub-Saharan Africa which contributed to a major monograph, The Archaeology of Islam in Sub-Saharan Africa (2003). In 1994 whilst supporting Rachel MacLean in her PhD research in Rakai district, Uganda, he completed a survey of mosque architecture in Buganda, and of sites associated with the expedition of John Hanning Speke between 1861 and 1863. In 1996, he undertook a survey of Dahlak Kebir in the Dahlak Islands, Eritrea, recording extensive quantities of surface scatters of trade ceramics, beads and glass, and a range of sites from Aksumite to Ottoman in date. In 1998, Insoll commenced the first modern excavations in Timbuktu, also in Mali. Excavations revealed material dating from the early 18th century onwards in a sequence of deposits of up to 5 m depth, and suggested earlier deposits were very deeply buried. Important information on later historical occupation was recovered including the use of a marine shell, Marginella, currency and on connections with the Fulani Caliphate of Masina in the 19th century.

=== Early Islamic Bahrain ===
In 2001 Insoll began his longest running research mission, the Early Islamic Bahrain project, sponsored by Shaikh Salman bin Hamad Al-Khalifa, Crown Prince and Prime Minister of the Kingdom of Bahrain. This has involved excavations and surveys nearly every year since, with co-directors Dr Salman Almahari and Dr Rachel MacLean, and latterly, Prof. Robert Carter. The aims of the project were to reconstruct settlement patterns in Bahrain from the Late Antique period onwards, and evaluate archaeological evidence for trade, conversion to Islam, and the composition of the population over time. The research has resulted in a permanent site museum in Bilad al-Qadim, an international conference Islamic Archaeology in Global Perspective in Bahrain National Museum (2017), and publications, including a study of all the Islamic inscriptions on Bahrain from before 1900, and an Archaeological Guide to Bahrain to encourage tourism. The project has had an impact in Bahrain where it has generated substantial interest in social media and via public archaeology days.

=== Projects in Northern Ghana ===
Between 2004 and 2013, and contiguous with the Early Islamic Bahrain project, Insoll directed research examining the archaeology of indigenous African religions in Northern Ghana, with a particular focus on the Talensi of the Tong Hills, and subsequently the figurines of Koma Land. This was completed with research partners Dr Rachel MacLean and Prof. Benjamin Kankpeyeng for the first phase, and Prof. Kankpeyeng for the second phase. The project was initially funded by the British Academy and subsequently by the Wellcome Trust. In the Tong Hills the research, though primarily archaeological, also involved analysis of extant material culture, particularly in relation to shrines, as well as oral history, medicine, and the processes of recording and preserving cultural heritage and architecture. The results indicated that shrines could have significant archaeological ‘histories’, encompassing up to 1500 years, were containers of memory, and could be widely franchised. Shrines also blurred the categories of natural and human constructed sacred spaces. The results were presented through a conference in the Wellcome Trust, Shrines, Substances and Medicine in Africa: Archaeological, Anthropological, and Historical Perspectives (2009), and publications.

The use of scientific investigative techniques was expanded in the second phase of the research undertaken by Insoll to help in interpreting the meaning and role of enigmatic ceramic human and animal figurines and the mound contexts they were found during University of Ghana excavations directed by Prof. Benjamin Kankpeyeng. Computed Tomography (CT) scanning indicated that the figurines were manufactured either in parts or modelled as a solid object. Cavities were identified incised into them, particularly from the top of the head, mouth, ears, or nose probably for offering libations or for the insertion of other substances. Amongst the outcomes of the research was a booklet accompanying the exhibition, Fragmentary Ancestors, published to make the results accessible to a general audience. The research in northern Ghana also contributed to an edited volume, The Oxford Handbook of Prehistoric Figurines (2017), and a monograph, Material Explorations in African Archaeology (2015). Insoll's first research in Ethiopia (2013) was also completed for the same monograph, a survey of cattle modification practices amongst the Mursi undertaken with Dr Timothy Clack and Mr Olirege Rege.

=== Becoming Muslim project ===
Between 2016 and 2022, Timothy Insoll was Principal Investigator on a European Research Council (ERC) Advanced Grant funded project, Becoming Muslim: Conversion to Islam and Islamisation in Eastern Ethiopia. Initial funding for fieldwork in Harar (2014) and Harlaa (2015 and 2016) was provided by the British Academy and the Van Berchem Foundation. The ERC research team included ceramic, archaeobotany, zooarchaeology, osteology, and isotopic specialists and a project postdoctoral researcher, GIS specialist, Dr Nadia Khalaf. The project has established archaeological chronologies for Harar and Harlaa, both previously unexcavated, which show that Harar was founded subsequent to Harlaa in the mid-15th century as the capital of the Sultanate of Adal. Whilst Harlaa was established in the mid-6th century and abandoned in the 15th century. Harlaa was a major trade and manufacturing centre, with a particular burst of activity between the 11th and 13th centuries attested by material from a cosmopolitan range of sources, China, Yemen, Iran, Central Asia, Egypt, India, and across the Horn of Africa. Carnelian beads and marine shell were worked using South Asian derived techniques. Evidence for the presence of Muslims - mosques, burials, and dated Arabic inscriptions - occurred from the mid-12th century. Isotopic analyses of teeth from Muslim and non-Muslim burials suggested significantly different Islamisation processes to the Gao region with greater population mobility between urban and rural environments and less pastoralist conversion being influential factors. The research outcomes have been presented in numerous publications, and in a tri-lingual interpretative display, Harlaa - Lost City of the Medieval Sultanate of Harla, Ethiopia, installed in a community site museum at Ganda Biyo (Harlaa). A conference, Archaeological Perspectives on Conversion to Islam and Islamisation in Africa, and a special section in the journal Antiquity, “Cosmopolitanism in Medieval Ethiopia” (2021), also resulted from the research in eastern Ethiopia.

== Recognition ==
Timothy Insoll was awarded an OBE in the 2025 New Year Honours "For services to Archaeology in Bahrain and UK/Bahrain relations". He was elected as a Fellow of the Society of Antiquaries in 2001, a Fellow of the British Academy in 2023, and of the Royal Asiatic Society, and is the Honorary Archaeological Advisor to the Court of the Crown Prince and Prime Minister of Bahrain (since 2001), and an Honorary Lecturer at Addis Ababa University, Ethiopia. Previously, he was Honorary Curator of the Ghana Museums and Monuments Board (2017–2019), Visiting Professor at Jinka University, Ethiopia (2017–2019), and Honorary Academic Curator of African Archaeology at Manchester Museum (2014–2016). In recent years he has been an advisory board member, Islamic Galleries re-development, British Museum (2016–2018); a specialist assessor for the Cultural Protection Fund of the British Council (2016–2018); scientific committee member for the Institut du Monde Arabe (Paris) exhibition, Islamic Art and Architecture in Africa (2016); a member of the Ellerman Foundation Project steering group for research on and access to Islamic collections, Whitworth Art Gallery, Manchester Museum, and Manchester Art Gallery; on the advisory committee for the development of the new South Asia gallery at Manchester Museum in partnership with the British Museum (2015-2016); and a scientific committee member (2013) of The Gold Route: Art, Culture, and Trade Across the Sahara Exhibition, Art Institute, Chicago.

He is currently on the editorial boards of the Annales d’Éthiopie, Antiquity, Ghana Social Science Journal, Journal of Islamic Archaeology, Journal of African Archaeology, Journal of Skyscape Archaeology, Material Religion, and Polish Archaeology in the Mediterranean. Previously he was on the editorial board of the African Archaeological Review (2000–2012) and joint editor of the series, Cambridge Monographs in African Archaeology (2006–2011). He has appeared in various media, particularly in relation to the destruction, protection, and restoration of Islamic heritage (e.g., BBC World News, Al-Jazeera, Australian Broadcasting Corporation, Radio France International, Canadian Broadcasting Corporation), his archaeological research in eastern Ethiopia (e.g., BBC World Service, The Daily Telegraph, Newsweek, Radio France International), and the relationship between archaeology and religion (e.g., BBC R4 and Voice of Islam Radio).

== Academic partnerships and public engagement ==
Insoll has developed partnerships with various institutions in Africa, the Middle East and India, notably the Institut des Science Humaines (Mali), the University of Ghana and Ghana Museums and Monuments Board, MS University, Vadodara (India), the Authority for Research and Cultural Heritage and Addis Ababa University, Ethiopia, and the Bahrain Authority for Culture and Antiquities.

In 2021 he curated a community museum at the site of Harlaa in eastern Ethiopia, and co-curated the first permanent display on Islamic archaeology in the National Museum of Ethiopia in Addis Ababa, as well as an exhibition, The Benefits of Empire? 98 Euro-Colonial Images of Africa (2021–2022) in the Street Gallery, Exeter. In 2018 he curated, Remembering the Dead in Bahraini Shia Cemeteries (2018) also in the Street Gallery, and co-curated with Prof. Benjamin Kankpeyeng, Dr Samuel Nkumbaan, and Mr Malik Saako Mahmoud, Fragmentary Ancestors: Figurines and Archaeology from Koma Land, at the Manchester Museum (2013–2014). He also co-curated the sub-Saharan Africa section, with Dr Venetia Porter, of Hajj: Journey to the Heart of Islam (British Museum, 2012), for which he collected Hajj artefacts in Mali. In 2017 Insoll also curated the permanent exhibition in the visitor centre at the Al-Khamis Mosque, Bahrain.

In June 2018 Insoll co-organised the conference Representing Africa in British Museums, in the Royal Albert Memorial Museum, Exeter, with Tony Eccles, exploring the themes of cultural representation, the construction of time(lessness), and historical ethnography, and in January 2020 organised the inaugural Indian Ocean World Archaeology (IOW-Arch) conference at the Institute of Arab and Islamic Studies, University of Exeter. He also co-organised the second IOW-Arch conference, again in Exeter, in December 2022. Insoll has also developed the successful widening participation masterclasses, Pots and Mosques: Explorations in Islamic Archaeology (2018) at the University of Exeter and, The World in Manchester. Exploring the Heritage of Islam, Asia and Africa through Objects (2002) at the University of Manchester.

== Bibliography ==
=== Books ===
Title	Year	Co-author(s)	Publisher	ISBN
Islam, Archaeology and History: Gao Region (Mali) Ca.AD 900–1250	1996	n/a	Tempus Reparatum (Oxford)	0860548325
Case Studies in Archaeology and World Religion: The Proceedings of the Cambridge Conference	1999	n/a (edited volume)	Archaeopress (Oxford)	0860439569
The Archaeology of Islam	1999	n/a	Blackwell (Oxford)	0631201157
Urbanism, Archaeology and Trade: Further Observations on the Gao Region (Mali). The 1996 Fieldseason Results	2000	n/a	British Archaeological Reports (Oxford)	1841711233
Archaeology and World Religion	2001	n/a (edited volume)	Routledge (London)	0415221552
The Archaeology of Islam in Sub-Saharan Africa	2003	n/a	Cambridge University Press (Cambridge)	0521657024
Belief in the Past: The Proceedings of the 2002 Manchester Conference on Archaeology and Religion	2004	n/a	Archaeopress (Oxford)	1841715751
Archaeology, Religion, Ritual	2004	n/a	Routledge (London)	0415253136
The Land of Enki in the Islamic Era: Pearls, Palms, and Religious Identity in Bahrain	2005	n/a	Kegan Paul (London)	0710309600
The Archaeology of Identities: A Reader	2007	n/a	Routledge (Abingdon)	9780415415026
Archaeology: The Conceptual Challenge	2007	n/a	Duckworth (London)	9780715634578
Current Archaeological Research in Ghana	2008	n/a	Archaeopress (Oxford)	9781407303345
An Archaeological Guide to Bahrain	2011	Rachel MacLean	Archaeopress (Oxford)	9781905739363
The Oxford Handbook of the Archaeology of Ritual and Religion	2011	n/a (edited volume)	Oxford University Press (Oxford)	9780199232444
Temporalising Anthropology. Archaeology in the Talensi Tong Hills, Northern Ghana	2013	Rachel MacLean, Benjamin Kankpeyeng	Africa Magna (Frankfurt)	9783937248356
Material Explorations in African Archaeology	2015	n/a	Oxford University Press (Oxford)	9780199550067
The Oxford Handbook of Prehistoric Figurines	2017	n/a (edited volume)	Oxford University Press (Oxford)	9780199675616
The Islamic Funerary Inscriptions of Bahrain, Pre-1317 AH/1900 AD	2019	Salman Almahari Rachel MacLean	Brill (Leiden)	9789004380783
The Oxford Handbook of Islamic Archaeology	2020	n/a (edited volume)	Oxford University Press (Oxford)	9780199987870

=== Journal of Islamic Archaeology ===
- "First Footsteps in the Archaeology of Harar, Ethiopia". Journal of Islamic Archaeology: 189.
