= Kim Stallwood =

British animal rights advocate

- Born: 1955 (age 70–71)
- Organization(s): Animals and Society Institute
- Known for: Animal rights advocacy
- Website: www.kimstallwood.com grumpyvegan.com

Kim W. Stallwood (born 1955) is a British animal rights advocate, author, independent scholar, and consultant. He is European director of the Animals and Society Institute, an animal rights think tank. He was executive editor of The Animals' Agenda, an animal rights magazine (1993–2002), and is the editor of Speaking Out for Animals (2001) and A Primer on Animal Rights (2002). Stallwood blogs under the name Grumpy Vegan.

== Life and work ==
Stallwood was born and raised in Camberley, Surrey, England.

Stallwood is a former national director of People for the Ethical Treatment of Animals (1987–1992), campaigns officer for the British Union for the Abolition of Vivisection (1981–1985), and national organizer for Compassion in World Farming (1976–1978), for which he remains a consultant.

He was also the founder of the Animal Rights Network (ARN), the world's largest library on animal rights, which became the Animals and Society Institute.

In 2013, Stallwood published his first book, Growl: Life Lessons, Hard Truths, and Bold Strategies from an Animal Advocate, with Lantern Books. The book featured a foreword by Brian May.

== Legacy ==
Tier im Recht, a Swiss-based animal law foundation acquired the Kim Stallwood Collection of over 2000 books in 2021. In 2022, the British Library acquired the Kim Stallwood Archive. Some of the items from the Archive featured in the 2023 British Library Treasures exhibition From the Margins to the Mainstream: Animal Rights in Britain.

== Personal life ==
Stallwood had open-heart surgery with a replacement heart valve that was made from tissue from a slaughtered cow. He has stated that he was upset by this but there was no alternative option as without surgery he may have died.
