= Nommo =

Primordial ancestral spirits in Dogon religion and cosmogony

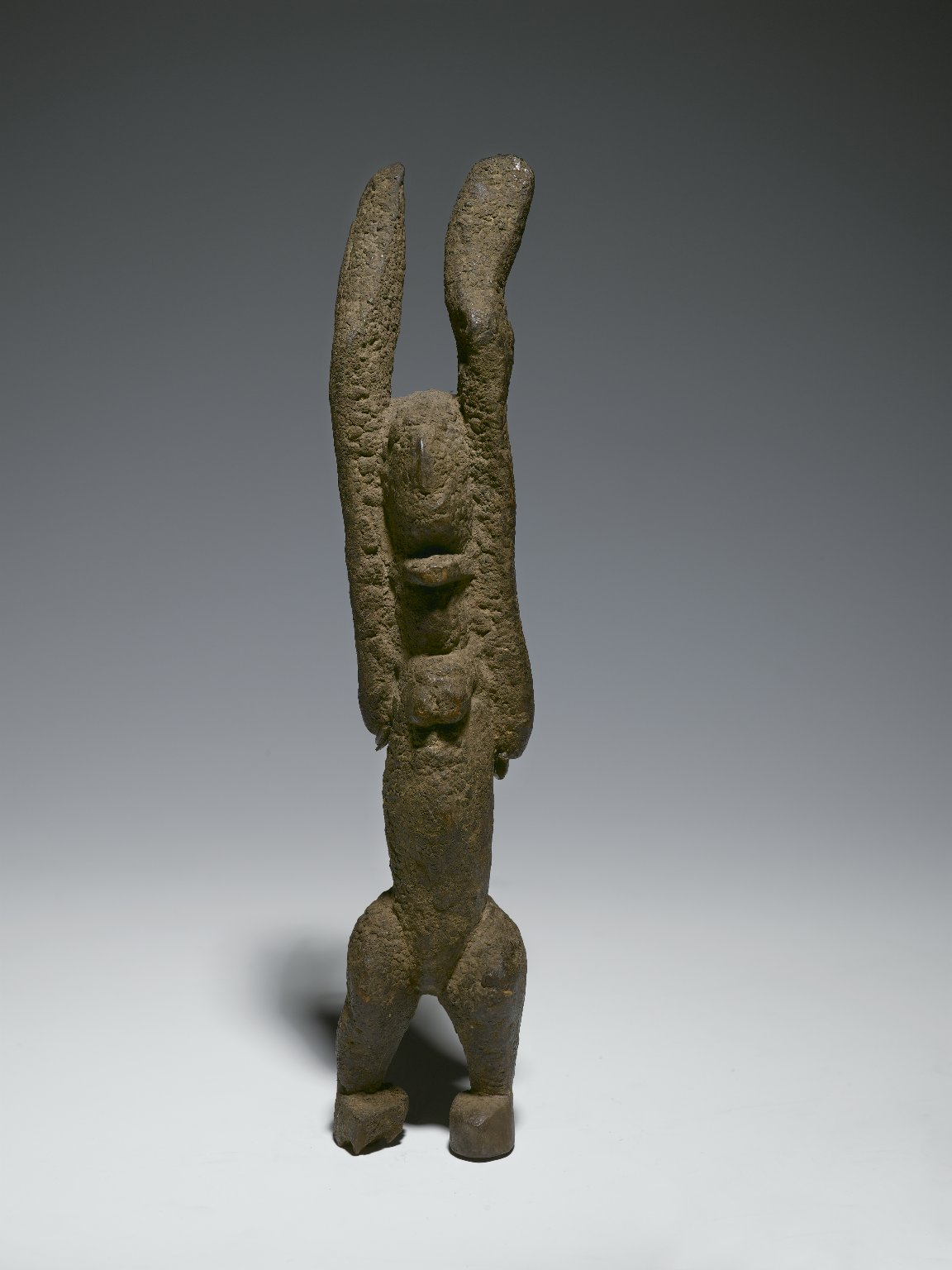
A Nommo figure of the Tellem people

The Nommo or Nummo are primordial ancestral spirits in Dogon religion and cosmogony (sometimes referred to as demi deities) venerated by the Dogon people of Mali. The word Nommos is derived from a Dogon word meaning "to make one drink." Nommos are usually described as amphibious, hermaphroditic, fish-like creatures. Folk art depictions of Nommos show creatures with humanoid upper torsos, legs/feet, and a fish-like lower torso and tail. Nommos are also referred to as "Masters of the Water", "the Monitors", and "the Teachers". Nommo can be a proper name of an individual or can refer to the group of spirits as a whole. For purposes of this article, "Nommo" refers to a specific individual and "Nommos" is used to reference the group of beings.

== Nommo mythology ==
Dogon religion and creation mythology says that Nommo was the first living creature created by the sky god Amma. Shortly after his creation, Nommo underwent a transformation and multiplied into four pairs of twins. One of the twins rebelled against the universal order created by Amma. To restore order to his creation, Amma sacrificed another of the Nommo progeny, whose body was dismembered and scattered throughout the universe. This dispersal of body parts is seen by the Dogon as the source for the proliferation of Binu shrines throughout the Dogons' traditional territory; wherever a body part fell, a shrine was erected.

In the latter part of the 1940s, French anthropologists Marcel Griaule and Germaine Dieterlen (who had been working with the Dogon since 1931) wrote that they were the recipients of additional, secret mythologies, concerning the Nommo. The Dogon reportedly related to Griaule and Dieterlen a belief that the Nommos were inhabitants of a world circling the star Sirius (see the main article on the Dogon for a discussion of their astronomical knowledge). The Nommos descended from the sky in a vessel accompanied by fire and thunder. After arriving, the Nommos created a reservoir of water and subsequently dived into the water. The Dogon legends state that the Nommos required a watery environment in which to live. According to the myth related to Griaule and Dieterlen: "The Nommo divided his body among men to feed them; that is why it is also said that as the universe "had drunk of his body," the Nommo also made men drink. He gave all his life principles to human beings." The Nommo are also thought to be the origin of the first Hogon.

== Controversy ==
Walter van Beek, an anthropologist studying the Dogon, found no evidence that they had any historical advanced knowledge of Sirius. Van Beek postulated that Griaule engaged in such leading and forceful questioning of his Dogon sources that new myths were created in the process by confabulation, writing that:

...though they do speak about sigu tolo [what Griaule claimed was Sirius] they disagree completely with each other as to which star is meant; for some it is an invisible star that should rise to announce the sigu [festival], for another it is Venus that, through a different position, appears as sigu tolo. All agree, however, that they learned about the star from Griaule.

Carl Sagan has noted that the first reported association of the Dogon with the knowledge of Sirius as a binary star was in the 1940s, giving the Dogon ample opportunity to gain cosmological knowledge about Sirius and the Solar System from more scientifically advanced, terrestrial societies whom they had come in contact with. It has also been pointed out that binary star systems like Sirius are theorized to have a very narrow or non-existent Habitable zone, and thus a high improbability of containing a planet capable of sustaining life (particularly life as dependent on water as the Nommos were reported to be).

Daughter and colleague of Marcel Griaule, Geneviève Calame-Griaule, defended the project, dismissing Van Beek's criticism as misguided speculation rooted in an apparent ignorance of esoteric tradition. Van Beek continues to maintain that Griaule was wrong and cites other anthropologists who also reject his work.

The assertion that the Dogon knew of another star in the Sirius system, Emme Ya, or "larger than Sirius B but lighter and dim in magnitude" continues to be discussed. In 1995, gravitational studies indicated the possible existence of a red dwarf star circling around Sirius but further observations have failed to confirm this. Space journalist and sceptic James Oberg collected claims that have appeared concerning Dogon mythology in his 1982 book and concedes that such assumptions of recent acquisition are "entirely circumstantial" and have no foundation in documented evidence and concludes that it seems likely that the Sirius mystery will remain exactly what its title implies: a mystery. Earlier, other critics such as the astronomer Peter Pesch and his collaborator Roland Pesch and Ian Ridpath had attributed the supposed "advanced" astronomical knowledge of the Dogon to a mixture of over-interpretation by commentators and cultural contamination.

== References in fiction ==
The belief structure surrounding Nommo, as well as Robert Temple's conclusion from his pseudoarchaeology book The Sirius Mystery, were used by Larry Niven and Steven Barnes as the background for the role-playing game in The California Voodoo Game, the third volume in their Dream Park series. Novelist Tom Robbins discusses Nommo and the Sirius mysteries in his novel Half Asleep in Frog Pajamas. Nommo and the Dogon are also widely mentioned in Philip K. Dick's novel V.A.L.I.S.. The Nommo are also mentioned in the second book of Ian Douglas's Legacy Trilogy (Battlespace) where the marines encounter the Nommo in the Sirius star system. There are also references to the Nommo in Grant Morrison's comic book series, The Invisibles. A major character in the webcomic series Forming by Jesse Moynihan is inspired by (and named) Nommo.

Since 2017, the African Speculative Fiction Society has given out a prize called the Nommo Award to science fiction and fantasy writing from the African continent or by writers from the African diaspora.

== In popular culture ==
Jazz composer and bassist Jymie Merritt dedicated a composition to the Nommo, circa 1965, entitled "Nommo." There is also a track titled "Nommo" on the 1995 album Spanners by British electronic group The Black Dog.
