= List of Catholic dioceses in Mali =

The Roman Catholic Church in Mali is composed of one ecclesiastical provinces and five suffragan dioceses. Its bishops form the Episcopal Conference of Mali.

== List of dioceses ==
=== Ecclesiastical Province of Bamako ===
- Archdiocese of Bamako
  - Diocese of Kayes
  - Diocese of Mopti
  - Diocese of San
  - Diocese of Ségou
  - Diocese of Sikasso
