= Demographics of Mali =

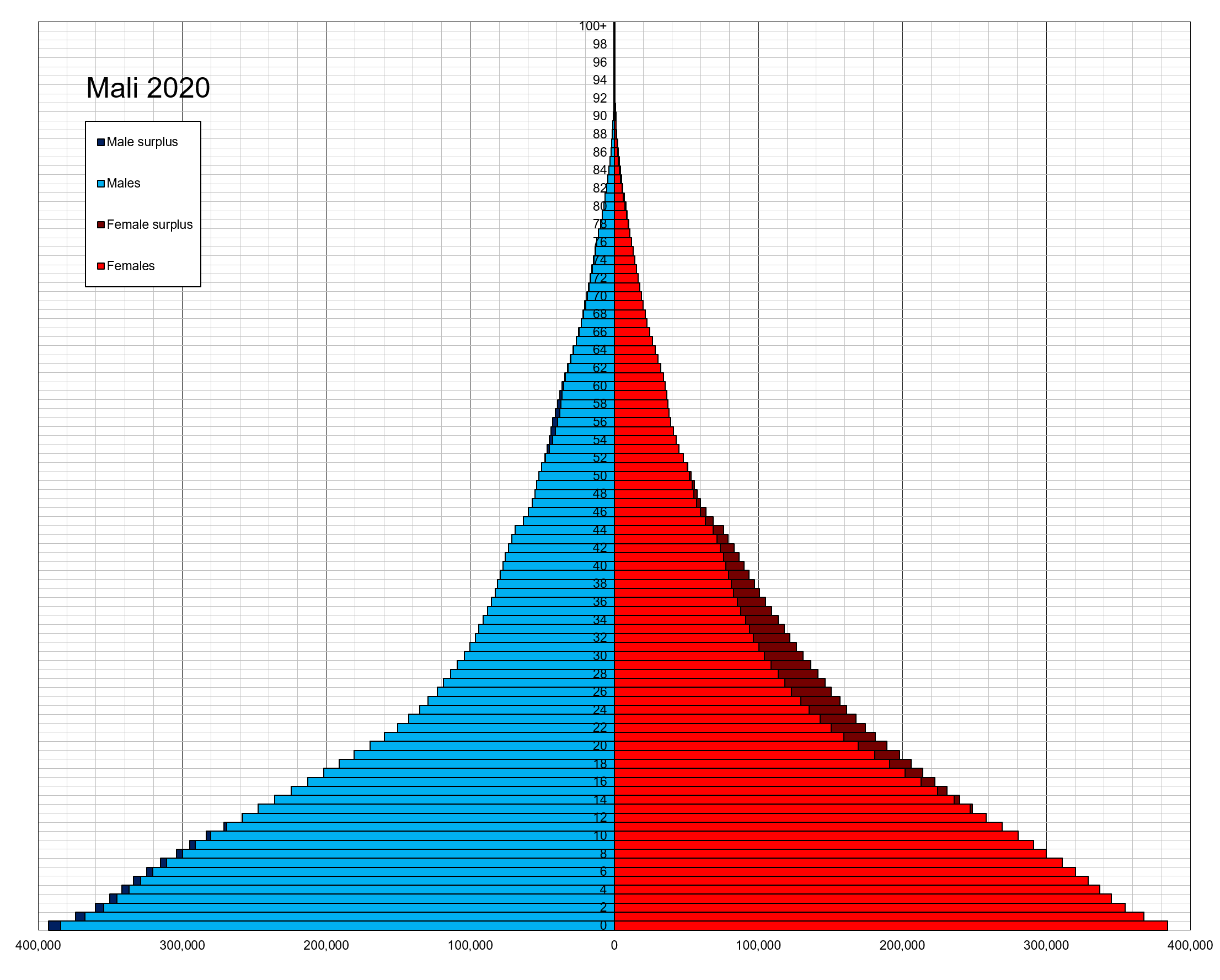
- Population pyramid of Mali in 2020
- Population: ▲22,395,489 (2022)
- Density: ▲19/km^{2} (49/sq mi) (2023)
- Growth rate: ▲3.38% (2022)
- Birth rate: 41.07 births/1,000 population (2022 est.)
- Death rate: 8.53 deaths/1,000 population (2022 est.)
- Life expectancy: 62.41 years
  - male: 60.19 years
  - female: 64.7 years
- Fertility rate: ▼6.1 children born/woman (2022)
- Infant mortality: ▼48 deaths/1,000 live births (2024)
- Net migration rate: -3.08 migrant(s)/1,000 population (2022 est.)

Age structure
- 0–14 years: 47.2% (2022)
- 15–64 years: 49.9% (2022)
- 65 and over: 2.8% (2022)

Nationality
- Nationality: Malian
- Major ethnic: Mandé (57.5%); Bambara (35.9%); Malinké (8.4%); Soninke (8.2%); Bozo (1.9%); Khassonké (1.2%); Samogo (0.7%); Dafing (0.5%); Kakolo (0.4%); Somono (0.3%); Fula (12.8%); Senufo (9.4%); Dogon (6.1%); Songhai (4.8%); Tuareg (3.9%); Bobo / Bwa (2.2%); Arabs (1.7%)
- Minor ethnic: Other (1.6%)

Language
- Official: Bambara; Bobo; Arabic; Bozo; Dɔgɔsɔ; Fula; Kassonke; Maninke; Minyanka; Senara; Songhay; Soninke; Tamasheq
- Spoken: Languages of Mali; French (working language)

Demographic features of the population of Mali include population density, ethnicity, education level, health of the populace, economic status, religious affiliations and other aspects of the population.

According to the 2022 general population and housing census, the population of Mali numbered around 22.4 million people.

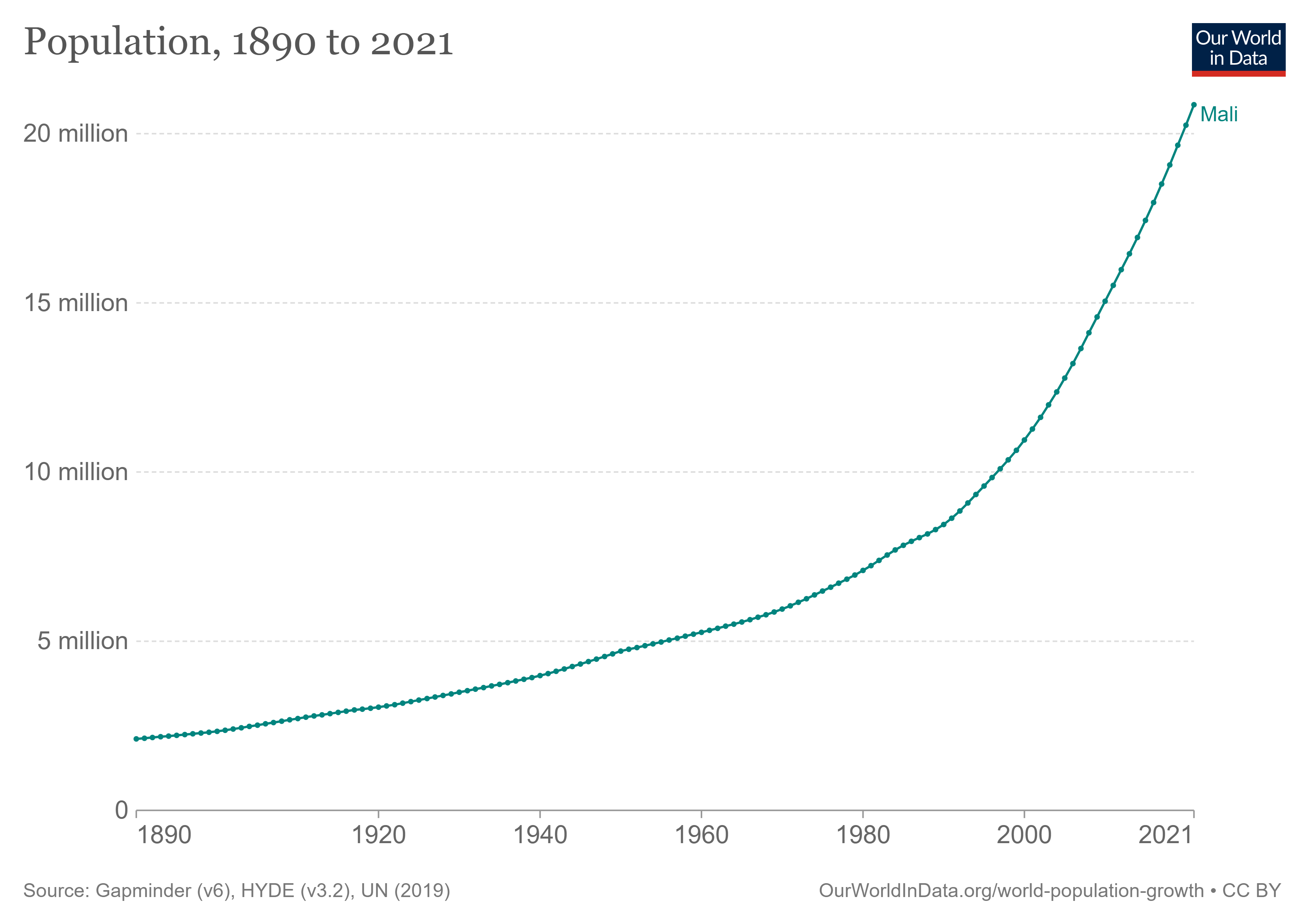
Mali's population (1890–2021)

== Population ==
Historical population
Year	Pop.	±% p.a.
1921	2,474,589	—
1926	2,634,982	+1.26%
1931	2,781,394	+1.09%
1951	3,347,000	+0.93%
1956	3,708,000	+2.07%
1960	4,100,000	+2.54%
1976	6,394,918	+2.82%
1987	7,696,348	+1.70%
1998	9,810,911	+2.23%
2009	14,528,662	+3.63%
2022	22,395,489	+3.38%
Sources: French Sudan censuses (1921–60) (Note: The census figures 1921 to 1960 should be taken with caution because French Sudan underwent a number of territorial changes during that time. Areas of French Upper Volta were granted to French Sudan in 1932 before being later returned in 1947. In 1944, the regions of Néma and Ayoun el Atrous were ceded to French Mauritania. In general, historical census data for French Sudan is often considered scarce and incomplete.); Malian censuses (1976–2022).

In 2021, Mali's population was an estimated 22 million, with an annual growth rate of 2.7%. This figure can be compared to 4,638,000 in 1950. The population is predominantly rural (69.7% in 2022), and 2% of Malians are nomadic. Approximately 90% of the population lives in the southern and central regions of the country. The capital district, Bamako, alone has over 4 million residents and holds 19% of the country's population. Despite constituting 57% of Mali's land area, the northern regions of the country in the Sahara are sparsely populated because of the harsh desert climate, which can only support transhumance and nomadism.

In 2007, about 48% of Malians were less than 15 years old, 49% were 15–64 years old, and 3% were 65 and older. The median age was 15.9 years. The birth rate in 2007 was 49.6 births per 1,000, and the total fertility rate was 7.4 children per woman.

The death rate in 2007 was 16.5 deaths per 1,000. Life expectancy at birth was 49.5 years total (47.6 for males and 51.5 for females). Mali has one of the world's highest rates of infant mortality, with 48 deaths per 1,000 live births. However, this figure has declined substantially from a peak of 205 deaths per 1,000 live births in 1966.

The proportion of the population aged below 15 in 2010 was 47.2%. 50.6% of the population were aged between 15 and 65 years of age. 2.2% of the population were aged 65 years or older.

The 2022 census recorded a literacy rate of 34.6%. There is a gender gap; 39.4% of Malian males are literate, while only 29.8% of females are. With 62.2% of its population being able to read and write, Bamako has the highest literacy rate in the entire country. The lowest literacy rate in Mali was recorded in the Ménaka Region, where less than one-in-ten residents were literate.

	Total population	Population aged 0–14 (%)	Population aged 15–64 (%)	Population aged 65+ (%)
1950	4 638 000	38.9	58.3	2.8
1955	4 928 000	40.1	57.4	2.5
1960	5 248 000	40.5	57.2	2.3
1965	5 597 000	41.5	56.2	2.3
1970	6 034 000	42.3	55.2	2.4
1975	6 604 000	43.3	54.1	2.6
1980	7 246 000	44.6	52.6	2.8
1985	8 010 000	45.8	51.3	2.9
1990	8 673 000	47.5	49.5	3.0
1995	9 825 000	47.4	49.9	2.8
2000	11 295 000	47.2	50.3	2.5
2005	13 177 000	47.1	50.6	2.3
2010	15 370 000	47.2	50.6	2.2

=== Structure of the population ===
Structure of the population (census January 2009):

Age group	Male	Female	Total	%
Total	7 204 990	7 323 672	14 528 662	100
0–4	1 328 871	1 294 514	2 623 385	18.06
5–9	1 202 875	1 154 948	2 357 823	16.23
10–14	918 866	865 138	1 784 004	12.28
15–19	732 526	783 620	1 516 146	10.44
20–24	529 535	612 368	1 141 903	7.86
25–29	449 099	546 603	995 702	6.85
30–34	385 003	427 795	812 798	5.59
35–39	325 005	326 894	651 949	4.49
40–44	271 239	275 364	546 603	3.76
45–49	228 626	217 261	445 887	3.07
50–54	189 424	192 382	381 806	2.63
55–59	148 594	134 083	282 677	1.95
60–64	127 557	123 461	251 018	1.73
65–69	88 292	77 082	165 374	1.14
70–74	67 319	66 063	133 382	0.92
75–79	40 904	36 197	77 101	0.53
80+	41 992	43 602	85 594	0.59
unknown	129 213	146 297	275 510	1.90
Age group	Male	Female	Total	Percent
0–14	3 450 612	3 314 600	6 765 212	46.56
15–64	3 386 658	3 639 831	7 026 489	48.36
65+	238 507	222 944	461 451	3.18

Population Estimates by Sex and Age Group (January 2018):

Age group	Male	Female	Total	%
Total	9 631 376	9 786 721	19 418 097	100
0–4	1 824 718	1 854 149	3 678 867	18.95
5–9	1 481 610	1 505 507	2 987 117	15.38
10–14	1 235 790	1 255 722	2 491 512	12.83
15–19	1 027 744	1 044 321	2 072 065	10.67
20–24	872 370	886 440	1 758 810	9.06
25–29	740 900	752 850	1 493 750	7.69
30–34	608 309	618 121	1 226 430	6.32
35–39	481 340	489 104	970 444	5.00
40–44	363 798	369 665	733 463	3.78
45–49	270 771	275 138	545 909	2.81
50–54	211 869	215 287	427 156	2.20
55–59	172 475	175 257	347 731	1.79
60–64	127 886	129 949	257 835	1.33
65–69	103 184	104 848	208 033	1.07
70–74	60 828	61 809	122 637	0.63
75–79	31 964	32 479	64 443	0.33
80+	15 820	16 075	31 895	0.16
Age group	Male	Female	Total	Percent
0–14	4 542 118	4 615 378	9 157 496	47.16
15–64	4 877 462	4 956 132	9 833 594	50.64
65+	211 796	215 211	427 007	2.20

== Vital statistics ==
Registration of vital events in Mali is not complete. The website Our World in Data prepared the following estimates based on statistics from the Population Department of the United Nations. (UN World Population Prospects 2024).

	Mid-year population	Live births	Deaths	Natural change	Crude birth rate (per 1000)	Crude death rate (per 1000)	Natural change (per 1000)	Total fertility rate (TFR)	Infant mortality (per 1000 live births)	Life expectancy (in years)
1950	4,695,000	245,000	176,000	69,000	52.2	37.5	14.7	6.96	211.1	28.17
1951	4,760,000	247,000	178,000	69,000	51.8	37.3	14.6	6.96	210.2	28.29
1952	4,825,000	249,000	178,000	70,000	51.5	36.9	14.6	6.95	208.4	28.53
1953	4,888,000	250,000	179,000	72,000	51.1	36.5	14.6	6.95	206.9	28.76
1954	4,951,000	252,000	179,000	73,000	50.8	36.1	14.7	6.94	205.5	28.97
1955	5,015,000	254,000	180,000	74,000	50.5	35.8	14.7	6.94	204.3	29.13
1956	5,079,000	256,000	180,000	76,000	50.4	35.5	14.9	6.94	203.3	29.37
1957	5,145,000	259,000	182,000	77,000	50.2	35.3	15.0	6.95	202.5	29.47
1958	5,209,000	262,000	183,000	79,000	50.2	35.1	15.1	6.95	201.8	29.59
1959	5,275,000	267,000	185,000	81,000	50.5	35.1	15.4	6.99	201.2	29.65
1960	5,347,000	270,000	187,000	83,000	50.5	35.0	15.5	7.00	200.6	29.75
1961	5,420,000	274,000	189,000	84,000	50.4	34.9	15.5	7.00	200.0	29.83
1962	5,495,000	277,000	191,000	86,000	50.4	34.8	15.6	7.02	199.3	29.94
1963	5,570,000	281,000	193,000	88,000	50.4	34.6	15.8	7.03	198.4	30.15
1964	5,647,000	285,000	194,000	91,000	50.4	34.3	16.1	7.05	197.3	30.42
1965	5,726,000	290,000	195,000	94,000	50.5	34.1	16.4	7.08	195.8	30.62
1966	5,807,000	294,000	197,000	97,000	50.6	33.9	16.7	7.10	194.0	30.87
1967	5,888,000	299,000	198,000	101,000	50.6	33.6	17.1	7.13	191.8	31.21
1968	5,974,000	303,000	198,000	105,000	50.7	33.1	17.5	7.15	189.4	31.63
1969	6,062,000	306,000	199,000	108,000	50.4	32.7	17.7	7.17	186.9	32.05
1970	6,154,000	310,000	198,000	112,000	50.4	32.2	18.2	7.18	183.9	32.53
1971	6,248,000	315,000	199,000	116,000	50.4	31.8	18.6	7.20	181.3	32.94
1972	6,347,000	320,000	196,000	124,000	50.3	30.8	19.5	7.20	177.8	33.86
1973	6,455,000	326,000	195,000	131,000	50.4	30.2	20.3	7.21	174.8	34.57
1974	6,569,000	332,000	193,000	139,000	50.4	29.3	21.1	7.23	171.9	35.43
1975	6,687,000	338,000	192,000	146,000	50.5	28.6	21.9	7.24	169.0	36.23
1976	6,808,000	344,000	189,000	155,000	50.4	27.7	22.7	7.25	165.5	37.20
1977	6,935,000	350,000	187,000	163,000	50.4	26.9	23.5	7.28	162.0	38.11
1978	7,073,000	357,000	185,000	172,000	50.4	26.1	24.3	7.30	158.5	39.06
1979	7,218,000	365,000	183,000	182,000	50.5	25.3	25.2	7.32	155.0	39.95
1980	7,373,000	372,000	182,000	190,000	50.3	24.7	25.7	7.33	151.5	40.75
1981	7,533,000	379,000	183,000	195,000	50.1	24.3	25.9	7.32	148.2	41.22
1982	7,696,000	383,000	183,000	200,000	49.6	23.7	25.9	7.27	144.6	41.82
1983	7,864,000	387,000	184,000	204,000	49.1	23.3	25.8	7.23	141.2	42.14
1984	8,030,000	394,000	183,000	210,000	48.9	22.8	26.1	7.22	138.0	42.70
1985	8,188,000	399,000	183,000	216,000	48.5	22.3	26.2	7.21	134.9	43.21
1986	8,335,000	405,000	181,000	224,000	48.3	21.6	26.7	7.24	131.7	43.98
1987	8,474,000	408,000	179,000	229,000	47.8	21.0	26.9	7.25	128.9	44.69
1988	8,617,000	413,000	176,000	237,000	47.7	20.4	27.3	7.26	126.3	45.39
1989	8,774,000	416,000	176,000	241,000	47.2	19.9	27.3	7.28	123.8	45.88
1990	8,945,000	419,000	173,000	246,000	46.7	19.3	27.4	7.25	121.8	46.62
1991	9,124,000	430,000	172,000	258,000	47.0	18.8	28.2	7.23	119.8	47.22
1992	9,311,000	437,000	173,000	263,000	46.7	18.5	28.2	7.18	118.1	47.50
1993	9,507,000	443,000	174,000	269,000	46.4	18.3	28.1	7.12	116.5	47.73
1994	9,712,000	452,000	177,000	275,000	46.4	18.2	28.2	7.07	115.2	47.74
1995	9,921,000	455,000	179,000	275,000	45.7	18.0	27.7	6.99	113.6	47.82
1996	10,132,000	464,000	182,000	282,000	45.7	17.9	27.8	6.95	112.1	47.79
1997	10,359,000	477,000	180,000	297,000	45.9	17.4	28.6	6.91	110.0	48.53
1998	10,620,000	492,000	180,000	312,000	46.2	16.9	29.3	6.89	107.9	49.16
1999	10,917,000	513,000	180,000	333,000	47.0	16.5	30.5	6.88	105.5	49.80
2000	11,239,000	530,000	180,000	350,000	47.1	16.0	31.1	6.87	102.8	50.54
2001	11,584,000	549,000	180,000	369,000	47.3	15.5	31.8	6.85	100.0	51.28
2002	11,953,000	568,000	178,000	390,000	47.5	14.9	32.6	6.82	97.1	52.22
2003	12,342,000	588,000	178,000	410,000	47.6	14.4	33.2	6.78	94.2	52.89
2004	12,752,000	611,000	179,000	432,000	47.9	14.0	33.9	6.74	91.4	53.54
2005	13,181,000	633,000	180,000	453,000	48.0	13.7	34.3	6.72	88.7	54.00
2006	13,624,000	649,000	180,000	469,000	47.6	13.2	34.4	6.69	86.2	54.62
2007	14,081,000	666,000	182,000	484,000	47.3	12.9	34.4	6.66	83.7	54.94
2008	14,551,000	684,000	184,000	501,000	47.0	12.6	34.4	6.64	81.2	55.29
2009	15,033,000	705,000	183,000	521,000	46.8	12.2	34.6	6.61	78.8	55.87
2010	15,529,000	724,000	184,000	541,000	46.6	11.8	34.8	6.58	76.5	56.38
2011	16,040,000	743,000	185,000	558,000	46.2	11.5	34.7	6.55	74.2	56.76
2012	16,515,000	762,000	186,000	576,000	45.9	11.2	34.7	6.52	72.0	57.08
2013	17,004,000	771,000	186,000	585,000	45.3	10.9	34.3	6.49	70.0	57.36
2014	17,552,000	788,000	185,000	602,000	44.8	10.5	34.2	6.44	67.8	57.90
2015	18,113,000	804,000	185,000	619,000	44.3	10.2	34.1	6.39	65.8	58.36
2016	18,700,000	820,000	186,000	634,000	43.8	9.9	33.9	6.32	63.9	58.73
2017	19,311,000	839,000	186,000	652,000	43.4	9.6	33.7	6.25	62.1	59.13
2018	19,934,000	856,000	188,000	668,000	42.9	9.4	33.5	6.18	60.4	59.39
2019	20,567,000	873,000	190,000	683,000	42.4	9.2	33.2	6.10	58.7	59.66
2020	21,380,000	889,000	206,000	668,000	41.0	9.5	30.8	5.85	57.1	65.5
2021	22,048,000	911,000	208,000	681,000	40.7	9.3	30.4	5.78	55.4	63.8
2022	22,729,000	931,000	204,000	687,000	40.3	8.9	29.8	5.69	57.1	62.4
2023	23,416,000	951,000	205,000	706,000	40.0	8.6	29.7	5.61	60.8	58.63

View source data.
View source data.
View source data.
View source data.

=== Demographic and Health Surveys ===
Total Fertility Rate (TFR) (Wanted Fertility Rate) and Crude Birth Rate (CBR):

Year	CBR (Total)	TFR (Total)	CBR (Urban)	TFR (Urban)	CBR (Rural)	TFR (Rural)
1981–1983		7.10		6.85		7.17
1984–1986		6.73		6.09		6.97
1995–1996	45.1	6.7 (6.0)	39.9	5.4 (4.8)	47.2	7.3 (6.6)
2001	45.1	6.8 (6.1)	42.1	5.5 (4.8)	45.9	7.3 (6.6)
2006	45.2	6.6 (6.0)	41.8	5.4 (5.1)	46.6	7.2 (6.5)
2012–2013	38.8	6.1 (5.3)	36.7	5.0 (4.3)	39.2	6.5 (5.6)
2018	40.9	6.3 (5.5)	36.3	4.9 (4.2)	42.3	6.8 (6.0)
2023–24	42.0	6.0 (5.4)	38.8	5.0 (4.5)	42.9	6.4 (5.8)

Fertility data as of 2012-2013 (DHS Program):

Region	Total fertility rate	Percentage of women age 15-49 currently pregnant	Mean number of children ever born to women age 40–49
Kayes	6.0	11.3	6.0
Koulikoro	6.0	14.3	5.8
Sikasso	6.6	11.5	6.2
Ségou	6.1	12.2	6.1
Mopti	6.5	11.7	5.9
Bamako	5.1	6.5	5.1

== Urbanisation ==
In 2022, the rate of urbanisation was recorded at 30.3%, up from 18.3% in 1998. Around 62.2% of the entire urban population in Mali resides in the autonomous capital district Bamako alone, followed by Sikasso (6.5%) and Ségou (4.7%). The northern Kidal Region has the highest proportion of urban residents at 32.7% of its population, while the regions of Dioïla, Nara, and Taoudénit are classified as completely rural.

== Immigration and emigration ==
Mali had an estimated net migration rate of –6.6 migrants per 1,000 people in 2006. About 3 million Malians are believed to reside in Côte d'Ivoire and France. Conversely, according to a 2003 estimate, Mali hosts about 11,000 Mauritanians; most are Fulani herders who routinely engage in cross-border migration. In addition, there are several thousand refugees from Côte d'Ivoire, Sierra Leone, and Liberia in Bamako and other urban areas of Mali.

== Ethnic groups ==
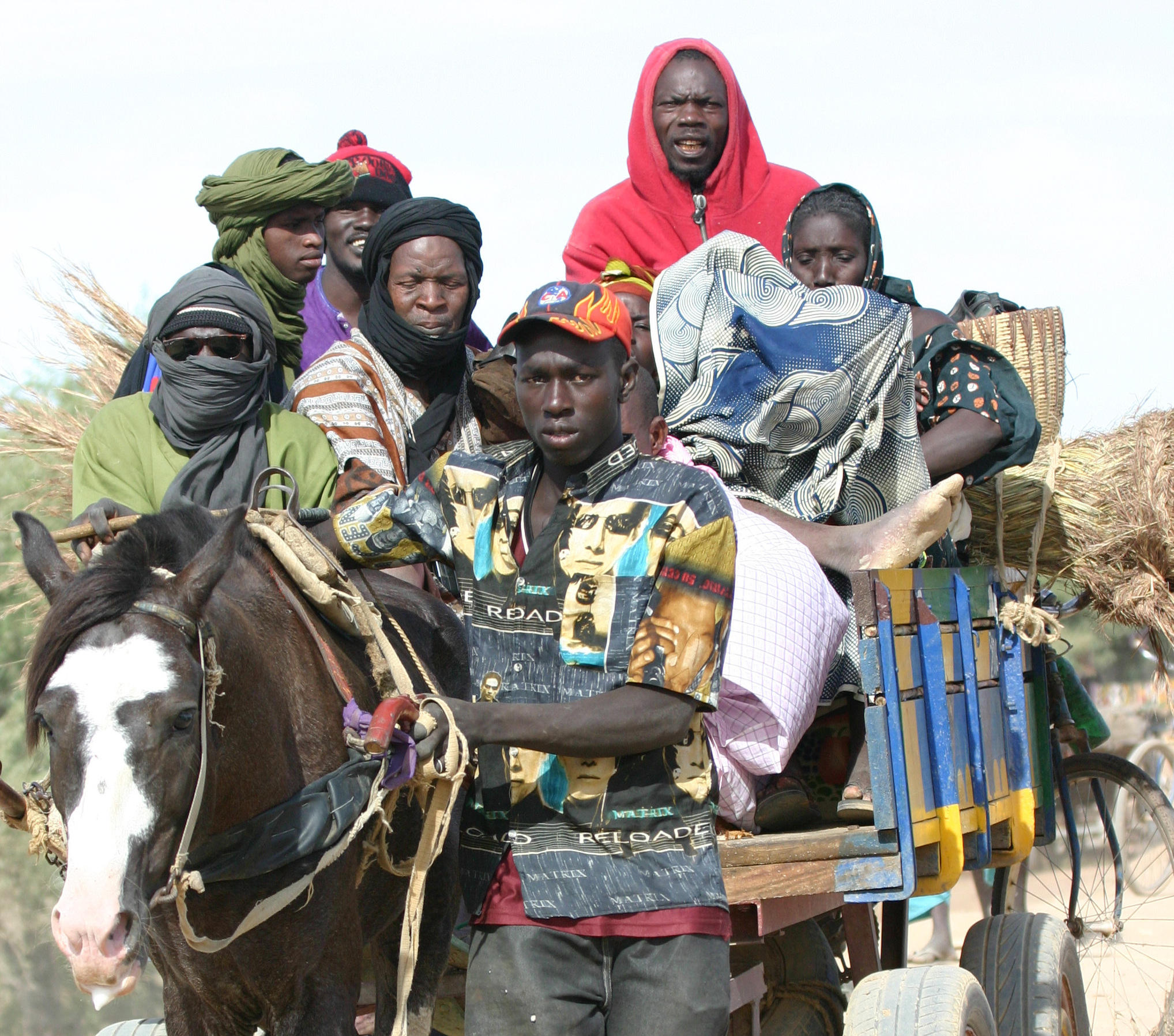
A family in Djenné, Mali.

Mali's population consists of Sub-Saharan ethnic groups, sharing similar historic, cultural, and religious traditions. Exceptions are two nomadic northern groups, the Tuaregs, a Berber people, and Maurs (or Moors), of Arab origins. In Mali and Niger, the Moors are also known as Azawagh Arabs, named after the Azawagh region of the Sahara. Azawagh Arabs speak mainly Hassaniya Arabic which is one of the regional varieties of Arabic.

The Tuaregs traditionally have opposed the central government. Starting in June 1990 in the north, Tuaregs seeking greater autonomy led to clashes with the military. In April 1992, the government and most opposing factions signed a pact to end the fighting and restore stability in the north. Its major aims are to allow greater autonomy to the north and increase government resource allocation to what has been a traditionally impoverished region. The peace agreement was celebrated in 1996 in Timbuktu during an official and highly publicized ceremony called "Flamme de la Paix" (peace flame).

Historically, interethnic relations throughout the rest of the country were facilitated by easy mobility on the Niger River and across the country's vast savannahs. Each ethnic group was traditionally tied to a specific occupation, all working within proximity to each other, although the distinctions were often blurred.

The Bambara, Malinké, Sarakole, Dogon and Songhay are farmers; the Fula or Fulani, Maur, and Tuareg are herders, while the Bozo and Somono are fishers. In recent years this linkage has shifted considerably, as ethnic groups seek nontraditional sources of income.

Ethnic background of residents
Ethnic Group	2022 Census	
Ethnic Group	Population	%
Bambara	8,039,981	35.9
Fulani	2,866,623	12.8
Senufo	2,105,176	9.4
Malinké	1,881,221	8.4
Soninke	1,836,430	8.2
Dogon	1,366,125	6.1
Songhai	1,074,984	4.8
Tuareg	873,424	3.9
Bobo/Bwa	492,701	2.2
Bozo	425,514	1.9
Arab	380,723	1.7
Khassonké	268,746	1.2
Samogo	156,768	0.7
Dafing	111,977	0.5
Mossi	89,582	0.4
Somono	67,186	0.3
Hausa	22,396	0.1
Other	335,932	1.5
Total	22,395,489	100

=== Europeans in Mali ===
People of European origin form a small minority in the country. They include those of mixed European and African descendant, as well as those of full European background. The latter includes the French, as well as the Spanish, Irish, Italian and Portuguese origins. Some of them descend from the Arma people (1% of the nation's population). They mainly live in Bamako, Sikasso, Kalabancoro, Koutiala, Ségou, Kayes, Kati, Mopti, Niono, Gao, San, Koro, Bla, Bougouni, Mandé, Baguineda-Camp, Kolondiéba, Kolokani, and others.

== Languages ==
Although each ethnic group speaks a separate language, nearly 80% of Malians communicate over ethnic borders in Bambara, which is the common language of the marketplace. French was formerly the country's official language and is spoken somewhat by 30% of Malians.

== Religion ==
An estimated 95% of Malians are Sunni Muslim, 4% adhere to indigenous or traditional animist beliefs, and 1% are Christian (about two-thirds Roman Catholic and one-third Protestant). Atheism and agnosticism are believed to be rare among Malians, most of whom practice their religion on a daily basis. Islam as practiced in Mali can be moderate, tolerant, and adapted to local conditions; relations between Muslims and practitioners of minority religious faiths are generally amicable. The constitution establishes a secular state and provides for freedom of religion.

Although Animists have the highest total fertility rate (TFR) in Mali at 7.5 births per woman, their share of the population has experienced a steep decline from 2.0% to 0.7% between 2009 and 2022.

Religious affiliation by census year
Religion	2009 Census		2022 Census	
Religion	Population	%	Population	%
Islam	13,773,172	94.8	21,589,251	96.4
Christianity	348,688	2.4	515,096	2.3
Catholicism	—N/a	—N/a	313,537	1.4
Protestantism	—N/a	—N/a	179,164	0.8
Other Christian	—N/a	—N/a	22,395	0.1
Animism	290,573	2.0	156,768	0.7
Other	—N/a	—N/a	26,428	0.1
No religion	87,172	0.6	107,946	0.5
Unavailable	29,057	0.2	—N/a	—N/a
Total	14,528,662	100	22,395,489	100

== Health ==
Life expectancy in Mali

Mali's health and development indicators rank among the worst in the world. In 2000 only 62–65 percent of the population was estimated to have access to safe drinking water and only 69 percent to sanitation services of some kind; only 8 percent was estimated to have access to modern sanitation facilities. Only 20 percent of the nation's villages and livestock watering holes had modern water facilities.

There were an estimated 140,000 cases of human immunodeficiency virus/acquired immune deficiency syndrome (HIV/AIDS) reported in 2003, and an estimated 1.9 percent of the adult population was afflicted with HIV/AIDS that year, among the lowest rates in Sub-Saharan Africa (see also HIV/AIDS in Africa). In the same year, there were 12,000 AIDS deaths. The infant mortality rate is 69.5 deaths/1,000 live births (75.3/1,000 among males and 63.5/1,000 among females) (2017 est.). Life expectancy at birth is 60.3 years (58.2 years among males and 62.5 years among females) (2017 est.).

=== Life expectancy ===
Period	Life expectancy in Years
1950–1955	26.96
1955–1960	▲27.98
1960–1965	▲28.61
1965–1970	▲30.79
1970–1975	▲34.20
1975–1980	▲37.71
1980–1985	▲41.55
1985–1990	▲44.51
1990–1995	▲46.57
1995–2000	▲46.75
2000–2005	▲49.96
2005–2010	▲54.03
2010–2015	▲56.24

== See also ==
- Demographics of Africa
- Demographics of West Africa
