= Jean Zerbo =

Malian Roman Catholic prelate (born 1943)

His Eminence Jean Zerbo
- Cardinal Archbishop Emeritus of Bamako
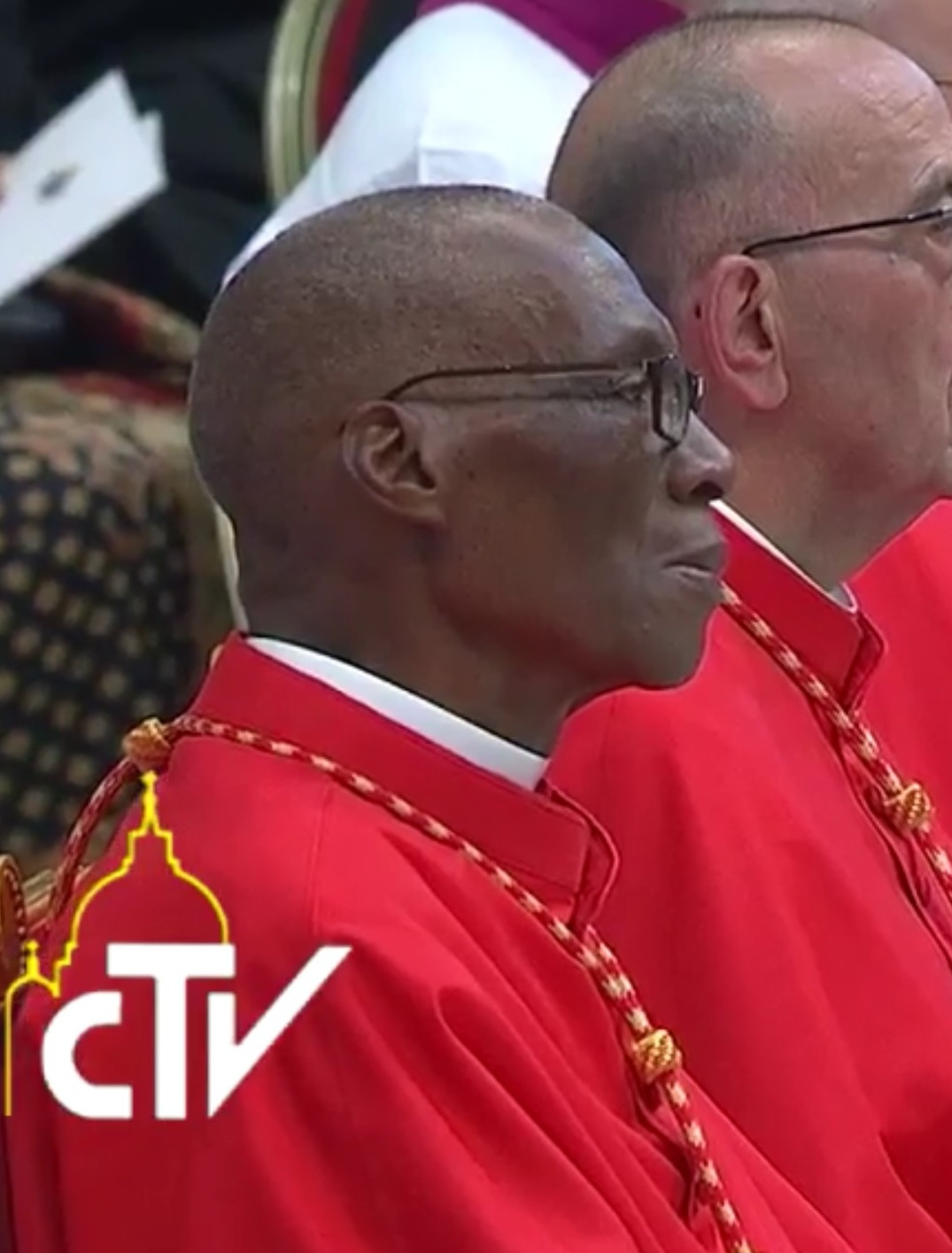
- Zerbo in June 2017
- Church: Roman Catholic
- Archdiocese: Bamako
- See: Bamako
- Appointed: 27 June 1998
- Term ended: 25 July 2024
- Predecessor: Luc Auguste Sangaré
- Successor: Robert Cissé
- Other post: Cardinal-Priest of Sant'Antonio da Padova in Via Tuscolana (2017-)
- Previous posts: Auxiliary Bishop of Bamako (1988–94); Titular Bishop of Accia (1988–94); Bishop of Mopti (1994–98)

Orders
- Ordination: 10 July 1971 by Pierre Louis Leclerc
- Consecration: 20 November 1988 by Jozef Tomko
- Created cardinal: 28 June 2017 by Pope Francis
- Rank: Cardinal-Priest

Personal details
- Born: 27 December 1943 (age 82) Ségou, Mali
- Motto: Intendant des mystères de Dieu
- Coat of arms

Jean Zerbo (born 27 December 1943) is a Malian prelate of the Catholic Church who served as Archbishop of Bamako from 1998 to 2024. Pope Francis raised him to the rank of cardinal on 28 June 2017. He is the first cardinal from Mali.

== Biography ==
Jean Zerbo was born on 27 December 1943 in Ségou, Mali, and ordained a priest there on 10 July 1971 by Pierre Louis Leclerc, Bishop of Ségou.

He continued his education first in Lyon in 1975 and then in Rome at the Pontifical Biblical Institute from 1977 to 1981, earning his licenciate in sacred scripture. Beginning in 1982, he was assigned to parish work in Markala while also teaching at the Major Seminary in Bamako.

On 21 June 1988, Pope John Paul II appointed him Auxiliary Bishop of Bamako and Titular Bishop of Accia. On 20 November 1988, he was consecrated bishop by Jozef Tomko, Prefect of the Congregation for the Evangelization of Peoples, with Luc Auguste Sangaré, Archbishop of Bamako, and Joseph Paul Barnabé Perrot, Bishop emeritus of San, as co-consecrators.

On 19 December 1994, Pope John Paul II named him Bishop of Mopti and on 27 June 1998 Archbishop of Bamako.

Pope Francis raised Zerbo to the rank of cardinal at a consistory on 28 June 2017, assigning him the rank of cardinal-priest with the title of Sant'Antonio da Padova in Via Tuscolana. He is the first cardinal from Mali. At the end of May, Le Monde reported that Zerbo and other Malian prelates had secret Swiss bank accounts. Mali's conference of bishops responded that the financial dealings were "transparent", called the news report "tendentious", and noted that the Swiss Leaks release of financial documents appeared timed to embarrass the Catholic Church in Mali just when Zerbo's elevation put it in the public spotlight. La Stampa said that Zerbo's participation in the consistory demonstrated that an internal investigation had cleared him of financial wrongdoing.

As archbishop he has fostered dialogue between Christians and Mali's Muslim majority and participated in peace negotiations, as well as called for humanitarian aid to those affected by conflicts in the country. In 2012, he was part of a delegation of representatives of civil society that participated in discussions between Mali's ruling military regime and opposition political parties. He has been an advocate for national reconciliation ever since. He has also served as president of Caritas Mali, an international aid program for refugees and the poor.

On 4 October 2017, he was appointed a member of the Congregation for the Evangelization of Peoples. Pope Francis made him a member of the Dicastery for the Laity, Family and Life on 23 December 2017.

Pope Francis accepted his resignation as archbishop of Bamako on 25 July 2024.

== See also ==
- Catholic Church in Mali

Catholic Church titles
| Preceded by Louis Jean Dufaux | — TITULAR — Titular Bishop of Accia; 21 June 1988 – 19 December 1994 | Succeeded by Jean-Claude Périsset |
| Preceded by Georges Biard | Bishop of Mopti; 19 December 1994 – 27 June 1998 | Succeeded by Georges Fonghoro |
| Preceded by Luc Auguste Sangaré | Archbishop of Bamako; 27 June 1998 – 25 July 2024 | Succeeded by Robert Cissé |
| Preceded by Paulo Evaristo Arns | Cardinal-Priest of Sant'Antonio da Padova in Via Tuscolana; 28 June 2017– | Incumbent |
