= Noël Bernard Coulibaly =

Malian Catholic prelate (born 1976

The Most Reverend Noël Bernard Coulibaly
- Bishop-Elect of Sikasso, Mali
- Church: Catholic Church
- Archdiocese: Roman Catholic Archdiocese of Bamako
- See: Diocese of Sikasso
- Appointed: 19 March 2026
- Installed: 4 July 2026
- Predecessor: Robert Cissé (14 December 2022 – 25 July 2024)
- Successor: Incumbent

Orders
- Ordination: 6 July 2002
- Consecration: 4 July 2026 by Robert Cissé
- Rank: Bishop

Personal details
- Born: Noël Bernard Coulibaly; 17 December 1978 (age 47) Niono, Ségou Region, Mali
- Motto: Gratis accepistis, gratis date (Freely you have received, freely give)

Styles of Noël Bernard Coulibaly
- Reference style: His Grace; The Right Reverend
- Spoken style: Your Grace
- Religious style: Bishop

Noël Bernard Coulibaly (born 17 December 1976) is a Malian Catholic prelate who was appointed as the bishop of the Diocese of Sikasso, in Mali on 19 March 2026. Before that, he served as a priest of the same Catholic diocese, since 6 July 2002. He was appointed by Pope Leo XIV. His consecration took place on 4 July 2026 at Sikasso, Mali.

== Background and education ==
Noël Bernard Coulibaly was born on 17 December 1976 in Niono, Diocese of Sikasso, in the Ségou Region of Mali. He studied philosophy at the Saint Augustin Major Seminary in Bamako. He then studied theology at the same seminary, graduating with a bachelor's degree in the subject. From 2006 until 2009, he studied at the Catholic University of Lyon in France, where he graduated with a master's degree in "local development engineering".

== Priest ==
He was ordained a priest for the Diocese of Sikasso, on 6 July 2002. He served as a priest until 19 March 2026. While a priest, he served in various roles and locations, including:

- Deputy parish priest of Notre Dame de Fatima in Sanzana, in the Diocese of Sikasso from 2002 until 2003.
- Administrator of the Notre Dame de Lourdes Cathedral in Sikasso from 2003 until 2004.
- Parish priest of Notre Dame de Lourdes Cathedral in Sikasso from 2004 until 2006.
- Studies in Lyon, France at the Catholic University of Lyon, leading to the award of a master's degree in "local development engineering" from 2006 until 2009.
- Collaborator at the parish of Saint Christophe Lès Annonay in the Roman Catholic Diocese of Viviers, in France from 2006 until 2009.
- Bursar of the diocese of Sikasso from 2009 until 2026.
- Coordinator of Caritas in the Diocese of Sikasso, Mali from 2009 until 2026.

== Bishop ==
On 19 March 2026, Pope Leo XIV appointed Reverend Father Monsignor Noël Bernard Coulibaly, a member of the clergy of Sikasso diocese to be the new bishop of the same Catholic See. The new bishop succeeded Robert Cissé, who served as local ordinary at Sikasso from 14 December 2022 until 25 July 2024, when he was elevated and appointed, Archbishop of Bamako. Bishop Noël Bernard Coulibaly received his episcopal consecration at Sikasso on 4 July 2026. The Principal Consecrator was Robert Cissé, Archbishop of Bamako who was assisted by fr:Jean-Baptiste Tiam, Bishop of Mopti and Jonas Dembélé, Bishop of Kayes.

== See also ==
- Catholic Church in Mali

== Succession table ==
Catholic Church titles
Preceded by Robert Cissé (14 December 2022 – 25 July 2024)	Bishop of Sikasso (since 19 March 2026)	Succeeded by (Incumbent)
