= Religion in Mali =

Religion in Mali (2022 census)
1. Islam (96.4%)
2. Christianity (2.30%)
3. Traditional faiths (0.70%)
4. Other religions / No religion (0.60%)

Islam is the predominant religion in Mali, with an estimated 96.4% of the population being Muslim, according to 2022 census figures. The second largest religion in the country is Christianity, practised by 2.3% of the population. Adherents of traditional African religions (e.g. Dogon religion) represent less than one percent of Malians. Atheism and agnosticism are believed to be rare among Malians, most of whom practice their religion daily, although some are Deist. Mali is a secular state, with freedom of religion enshrined in its constitution. Discrimination on religious grounds is constitutionally prohibited and abuses against religious freedoms are criminalized under the law.

Muslims are mostly Sunni belonging to the Maliki school of jurisprudence influenced with Sufism. Ahmadiyya and Shia minorities are also present. Approximately two-thirds of Christians are Catholic and one-third are Protestant.

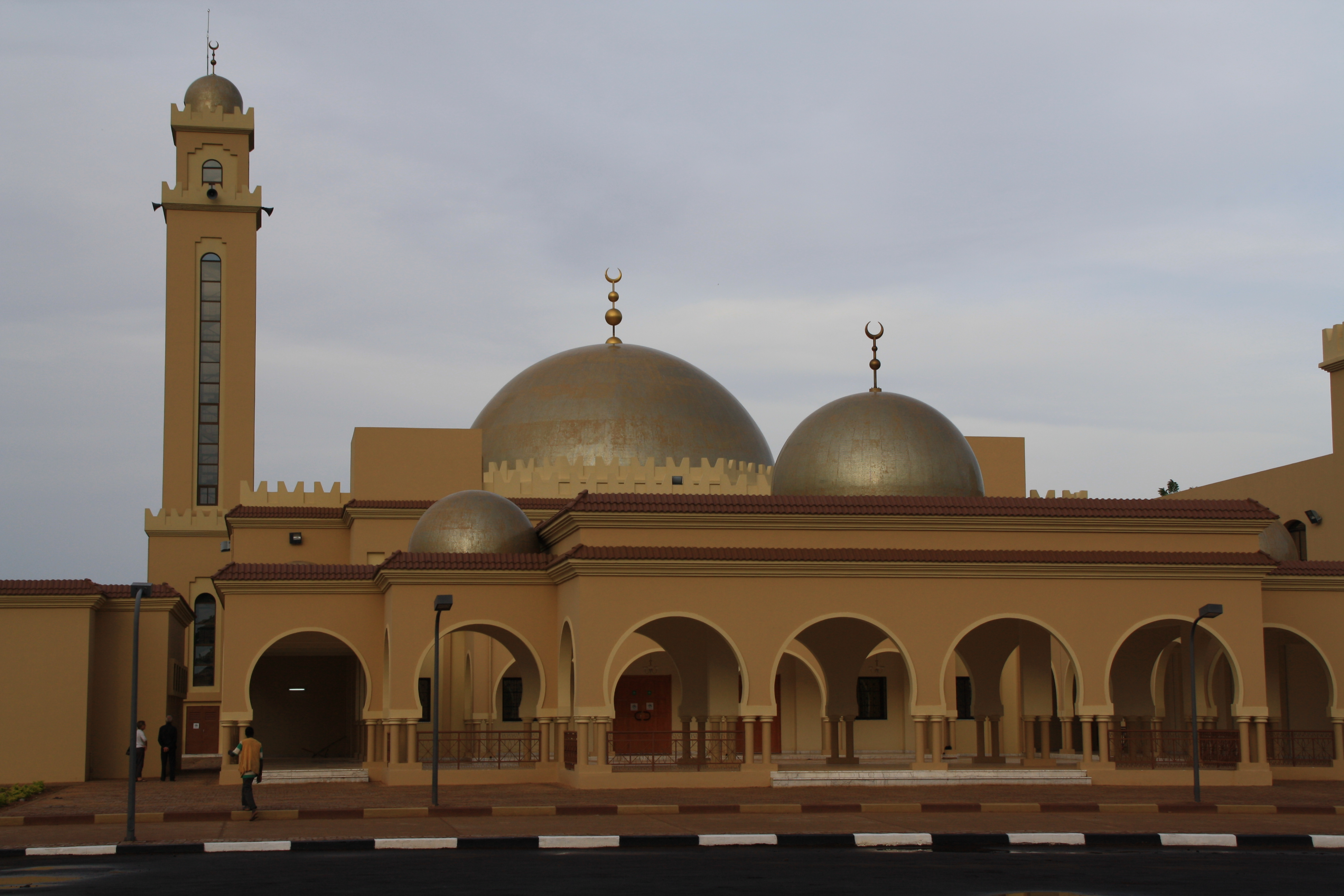
The Grand Mosque of Ségou

== Statistics ==
=== Censuses ===
The share of Muslims in Mali increased from 94.8% to 96.4% of the total resident population between the 2009 and 2022 general population and housing censuses. Conversely, the proportion of those identifying with traditional faiths decreased sharply from 2.0% to just 0.7% of the population in the same time period. This decline in traditional religions comes despite the fact that this demographic has the highest total fertility rate (TFR) in Mali at 7.5 births per woman.

Prior to the 2009 census, the official 20th century censuses of Mali (1976, 1987, 1998) did not collect data on religious affiliation or ethnicity. However, the 1960 demographic survey, which excluded northern and nomadic populations, did include questions on religious identity. The findings at that time showed 77% of Malians were Muslim, 22% identified primarily with traditional religions, and less than one percent were Christian. By the 21st century, both Muslims and Christians increased their share of the Malian population, while traditional religions declined.

Religious affiliation by census year
Religion	1960 Survey		2009 Census		2022 Census	
Religion	Population	%	Population	%	Population	%
Islam	2,665,643	76.5	13,773,172	94.8	21,589,251	96.4
Christianity	24,392	0.7	348,688	2.4	515,096	2.3
Catholicism	17,423	0.5	—N/a	—N/a	313,537	1.4
Protestantism	6,969	0.2	—N/a	—N/a	179,164	0.8
Other Christian	—N/a	—N/a	—N/a	—N/a	22,395	0.1
Traditional	749,167	21.5	290,573	2.0	156,768	0.7
Other	34,845	1.0	—N/a	—N/a	26,428	0.1
No religion	10,453	0.3	87,172	0.6	107,946	0.5
Unavailable	—N/a	—N/a	29,057	0.2	—N/a	—N/a
Total	3,484,500	100	14,528,662	100	22,395,489	100

==== Religion by region ====

Muslims exceed 90% of the population in the capital district Bamako and all of Mali's 19 administrative regions, with the exception of San. Indeed, the San Region holds the country's highest concentrations of Christians (17.0%), practitioners of traditional religions (8.3%), and those with no religious affiliation (3.7%). The northernmost region of Taoudénit has the highest proportion of Muslims, with over 99.8% of its population following Islam.

Followers of traditional religions mostly reside in rural areas, whereas the share of Muslims and Christians is slightly higher among the urbanised population. Nomadic groups in the country are almost completely Muslim.

Religious composition of each region (2022 census)
Region	Muslim	Christian	Traditional	No religion	Other
Bamako	97.58%	2.32%	0.01%	0.06%	0.03%
Bandiagara	93.96%	5.99%	0.04%	0.00%	0.01%
Bougouni	98.89%	0.93%	0.04%	0.11%	0.03%
Dioïla	98.48%	1.08%	0.03%	0.39%	0.02%
Douentza	99.64%	0.34%	0.01%	0.00%	0.01%
Gao	99.51%	0.47%	0.01%	0.00%	0.01%
Kayes	98.75%	0.70%	0.03%	0.42%	0.10%
Kidal	99.64%	0.29%	0.01%	0.02%	0.04%
Kita	98.80%	0.86%	0.04%	0.27%	0.03%
Koulikoro	95.32%	2.14%	0.74%	1.44%	0.36%
Koutiala	91.57%	4.32%	3.14%	0.62%	0.35%
Ménaka	99.67%	0.30%	0.02%	0.00%	0.01%
Mopti	99.10%	0.84%	0.01%	0.04%	0.01%
Nara	99.65%	0.19%	0.15%	0.01%	0.00%
Nioro	99.70%	0.11%	0.01%	0.14%	0.04%
San	70.10%	16.99%	8.33%	3.65%	0.93%
Ségou	98.52%	1.29%	0.04%	0.13%	0.02%
Sikasso	96.30%	1.50%	0.93%	1.04%	0.23%
Taoudénit	99.81%	0.18%	0.00%	0.00%	0.01%
Tombouctou	99.67%	0.31%	0.00%	0.02%	0.00%
Total	96.45%	2.27%	0.65%	0.50%	0.13%

==== Religion by ethnic group ====
Islam is the dominant religion among all Malian ethnic groups, with the exception of the Bobo and Bwa. The Bobo and Bwa communities largely identify as Christians or adherents of traditional religions, with only a minority being Muslim. Mandé groups are predominantly Muslim. Several ethnic groups in Mali, such as the Fula, Soninké, Songhai, Tuareg, Khassonké, and Arabs, are almost entirely Muslim.

Aside from the Bobo and Bwa, the Minyanka and other Senufo groups have the second highest proportion of traditional religions though over 80% identify as Muslims. Christianity is also practised by a large share of Minyanka (6.33%) and Dogon (6.07%).

Religious composition of each ethnic group (2009 census)
Ethnicity	Muslim	Christian	Traditional	No religion	Unknown
Bambara	97.73%	1.20%	1.03%	0.39%	0.04%
Fula	99.67%	0.26%	0.05%	0.10%	0.02%
Dogon	92.99%	6.07%	0.93%	0.11%	0.01%
Soninké	99.74%	0.19%	0.06%	0.11%	0.02%
Malinké	98.76%	1.00%	0.23%	0.48%	0.02%
Songhai	99.73%	0.20%	0.02%	0.07%	0.05%
Minyanka	82.00%	6.33%	11.56%	0.87%	0.10%
Tuareg	99.71%	0.23%	0.04%	0.07%	0.01%
Senufo^{*}	87.08%	2.14%	10.69%	2.56%	0.10%
Bobo/Bwa	23.61%	41.92%	34.18%	2.59%	0.29%
Bozo	99.53%	0.43%	0.02%	0.12%	0.01%
Khassonké	99.25%	0.69%	0.05%	0.15%	0.01%
Samogo	97.03%	2.39%	0.55%	0.08%	0.03%
Dafing	98.34%	0.67%	0.98%	0.46%	0.01%
Arab	99.82%	0.17%	0.01%	0.00%	0.01%
Hausa	98.58%	0.91%	0.51%	0.08%	0.00%
Other Malian	97.84%	1.08%	1.06%	0.11%	0.02%
Note that percentages may not add up to 100% exactly due to rounding deviations.^{*} Data for Senufo excludes the Minyanka people, who speak a Senufo language.

=== Surveys ===
Religion in Mali (Pew Research Center 2024)
1. Islam (90.0%)
2. Christianity (8.00%)
3. Traditional faiths (1.00%)
4. Other religions (1.00%)

A 2024 survey conducted by the Pew Research Center found 90% of respondents adhered to Islam (mostly non-denominational and Sunni), 8% followed Christianity, 1% practised traditional religions, and 1% identified with other religions.

A 2024 Afrobarometer survey reported 95.4% of 1,200 respondents were Muslim (mostly non-denominational), 1.8% were Christian (mostly non-denominational), 2.0% were adherents of traditional ethnoreligions, 0.8% had no religion, and 0.1% identified with other religions.

== History ==
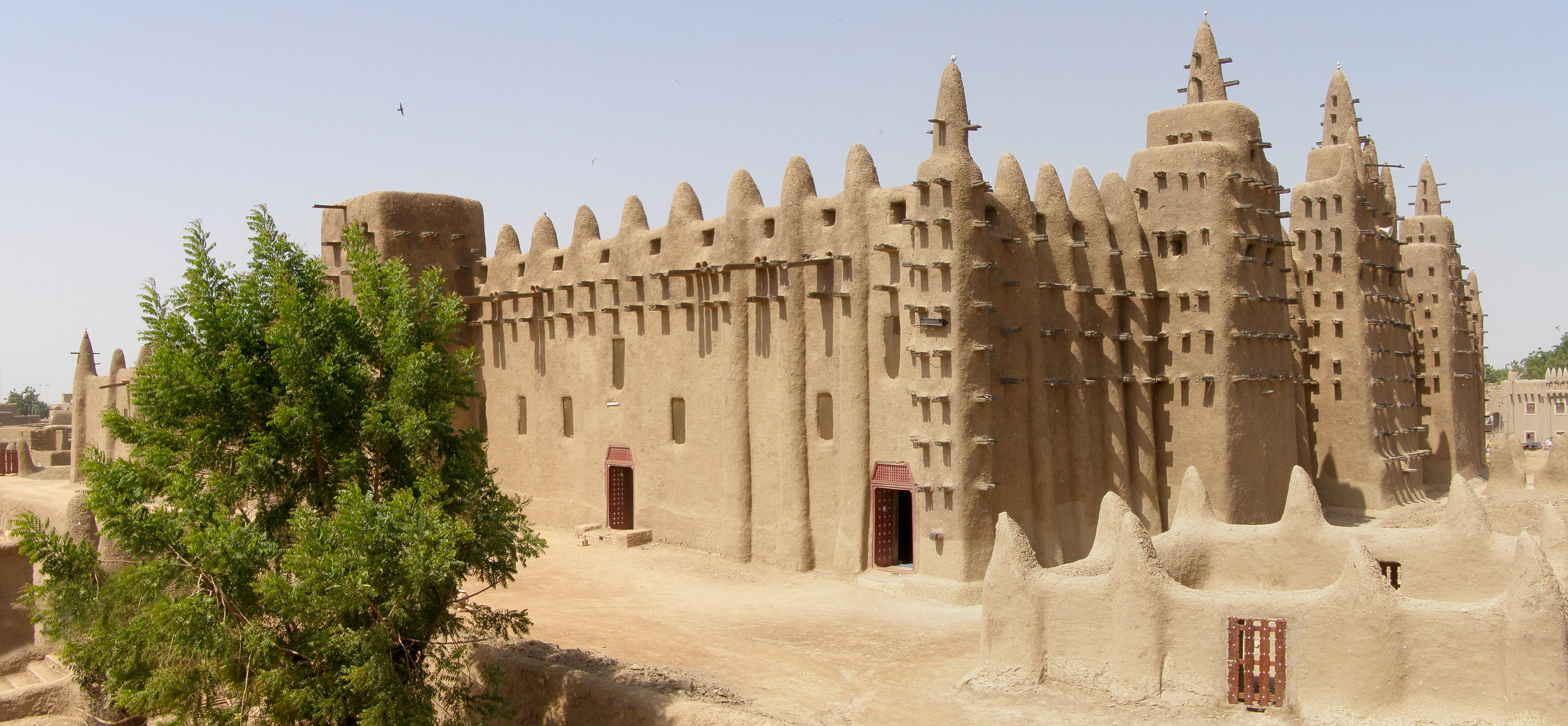
The Great Mosque of Djenné, Mopti Region, Mali

== Islam ==
According to the 2005 U.S. Department of State's annual report on religious freedom, Islam was traditionally practiced in Mali and was characterized as moderate, tolerant, and adapted to local conditions. Women were allowed to participate in social, economic and political activities and generally do not wear veils, except for some Tuareg women. According to the 2012 Pew Forum study The World's Muslims: Unity and Diversity, 94% of Muslims in Mali believed that religion is very important in their lives and 71% believed there is "only one true way to understand Islam's teachings" (24% believing that multiple interpretations of Islam are possible).

== Christianity ==
Christianity was introduced to Mali in the late 19th century by the French. In 2014, there were 275,000 Catholics in Mali, around 1.86% of the total population.

In 2020, Christians made up 2.35% of the country's population; over half of these were Catholic.

== Dogon religion ==
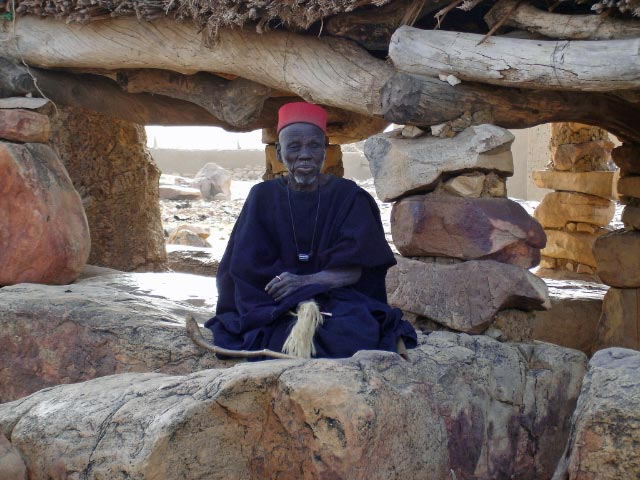
The Hogon, spiritual leader, of a Dogon village

The Dogon religion is the traditional African religious or spiritual beliefs of the Dogon people of Mali. Dogons who practice the traditional religion of their ancestors believe in one Supreme Creator called Amma (or Ama). Amma is the omnipotent, omniscient and omnipresent Creator in Dogon religion. They also believe in ancestral spirits known as the Nommo also referred to as "Water Spirits". Veneration of the ancestors forms an important aspect of their spiritual belief. Mask dances are held immediately after the death of a person and sometimes long after they have passed on to the next life.

== Secularism ==
The constitution establishes a secular state and provides for freedom of religion, and the government largely respects this right. Relations between Muslims and practitioners of minority religious faiths are generally friendly, and foreign missionary groups (both Muslim and non-Muslim) are tolerated. Parties based on ethnic or religious lines are banned and public schools do not offer religious instruction.

== Freedom of religion ==
Prior to the Northern Mali conflict, human rights groups recorded "no recent reports of persecution, discrimination, or imprisonment on the basis of religious convictions or affiliation." However, terrorist groups attempted to institute strict Islamic law in the northern parts of the country in 2012 and Mali was listed high (#7) in the Christian persecution index published by Open Doors, which described the persecution in the north as severe. In spite of this, a 2015 study estimated some 8,000 believers in Christ from a Muslim background in the country. Several Islamic sites in Mali were destroyed or damaged by vigilante activists linked to Al Qaeda, claiming that "idol worship" characterized the sites. Given the cultural and religious importance of the sites in the city of Timbuctu (Tomboctou), eight of the shrines on the UNESCO heritage list had been fully reconstructed, and another six were in the process of reconstruction, by July 2015. However, the occupation and Sharia law were both short-lived, cut short by a French and Chadian military intervention that began in January 2013.

In 2023, Mali was scored 2 out of 4 for religious freedom; this was mainly due to armed groups active in the north of the country. In the same year, the country was ranked as the 17th worst place in the world to be a Christian.

== See also ==
- Religion in Africa
