= Dioïla Region =

Dioïla
- Region
- Coordinates: 12.483333°N 6.800000°W
- Country: Mali
- Capital: Dioïla

Area
  - Total: 12,330 km^{2} (4,760 sq mi)

Population (2023)
  - Total: 666,756
- ISO 3166 code: ML

Dioïla Region is an administrative region in southern Mali. It was created from the division of the former Koulikoro Region in 2023 and has its capital in the town of Dioïla. The region lies in the southern interior of the country, between Bamako, Koulikoro and the agricultural areas of southern Mali.

== Geography ==
Dioïla Region is located in south-western Mali and covers an area of 12,330 km², corresponding to just under 1% of the national territory. It borders several Malian regions, including Koulikoro, Bougouni, Sikasso, San and Ségou. The area lies mainly in the Sudanian savanna and receives more rainfall than the northern Sahelian regions. The landscape is characterised by savannas, farmland and smaller river systems. The region lies within the drainage basin of the Niger River.

== History ==
The area of present-day Dioïla Region long belonged to Koulikoro Region after Mali’s independence. The former Dioïla Cercle formed the south-eastern part of that region. The creation of a separate Dioïla Region had already been envisaged in 2012. Law No. 2023-006 of 13 March 2023 on the creation of new administrative regions in the Republic of Mali established Dioïla as a separate region.

Historically, Dioïla belongs to the southern Mandé and Bambara cultural area. The population traditionally lived mainly from agriculture, livestock herding and local trade.

== Administrative divisions ==
The region is divided into six cercles. According to OCHA, it comprises 13 arrondissements, 23 communes and 361 villages.

Cercle code	Cercle	Communes
1301	Dioïla	6
1302	Banco	2
1303	Béléko	4
1304	Fana	7
1305	Massigui	2
1306	Ména	2

== Population ==
In 2023, the population was estimated at 666,756. The population is predominantly rural, Animism persisted in this area well into the 20th century. Dioïla is home to primarily Bambara farmers, and formed part of the pre-colonial Segou Empire. There are also populations of Muslim Fula, Soninke, Malinke and Dogon.

Year	Population
1998	332,972
2009	488,937
2023	666,756

Ethnicity in Dioila region (2022)
1. Bambara (71.4%)
2. Fula (18.7%)
3. Soninke (1.96%)
4. Malinké (1.69%)
5. Dogon (1.49%)
6. Other (4.76%)
Mother tongues in Dioila region (2022 census)
1. Bambara (89.85%)
2. Fula (5.82%)
3. Dogon (1.31%)
4. Maraka / Soninké (0.93%)
5. Other Malian (1.99%)
6. Other African (0.01%)
7. Other foreign (0.09%)

Religions in Dioila region (2022)
Religion	Percent
Islam	98.48%
Christianity	1.08%
Other or not stated	0.44%

== Economy ==
The economy of Dioïla Region is based mainly on agriculture, which is favoured by the region’s comparatively higher rainfall.
