= Diolila =

Dioila
- Town
- Location in Mali
- Coordinates: 12°29′N 6°48′W
- Country: Mali
- Region: Koulikoro Region
- Cercle: Dioila Cercle
- Commune: Kaladougou
- Time zone: UTC+0 (GMT)

Dioila is a small town and seat of the commune of Kaladougou in the Cercle of Dioila in the Koulikoro Region of south-western Mali. According to old aeronautical charts, the town was served by two airports: An old one near the town center and a new one across the river in the north. Recent maps and satellite imagery however show neither of the two.
