= Dandougou, Mali =

Dandougou
- Town
- Location in Mali
- Coordinates: 12°34′N 6°30′W
- Country: Mali
- Region: Koulikoro Region
- Cercle: Dioila Cercle
- Commune: Dolendougou
- Time zone: UTC+0 (GMT)

Dandougou is a small town and seat of the commune of Dolendougou in the Cercle of Dioila in the Koulikoro Region of south-western Mali.
