= Sant'Antonio da Padova in Via Tuscolana =

Church of Saint Anthony of Padua on Via Tuscolana
- Santi Antonio da Padova e Annibale Maria (in Italian); S. Antonii Patavini in via Tusculana (in Latin)
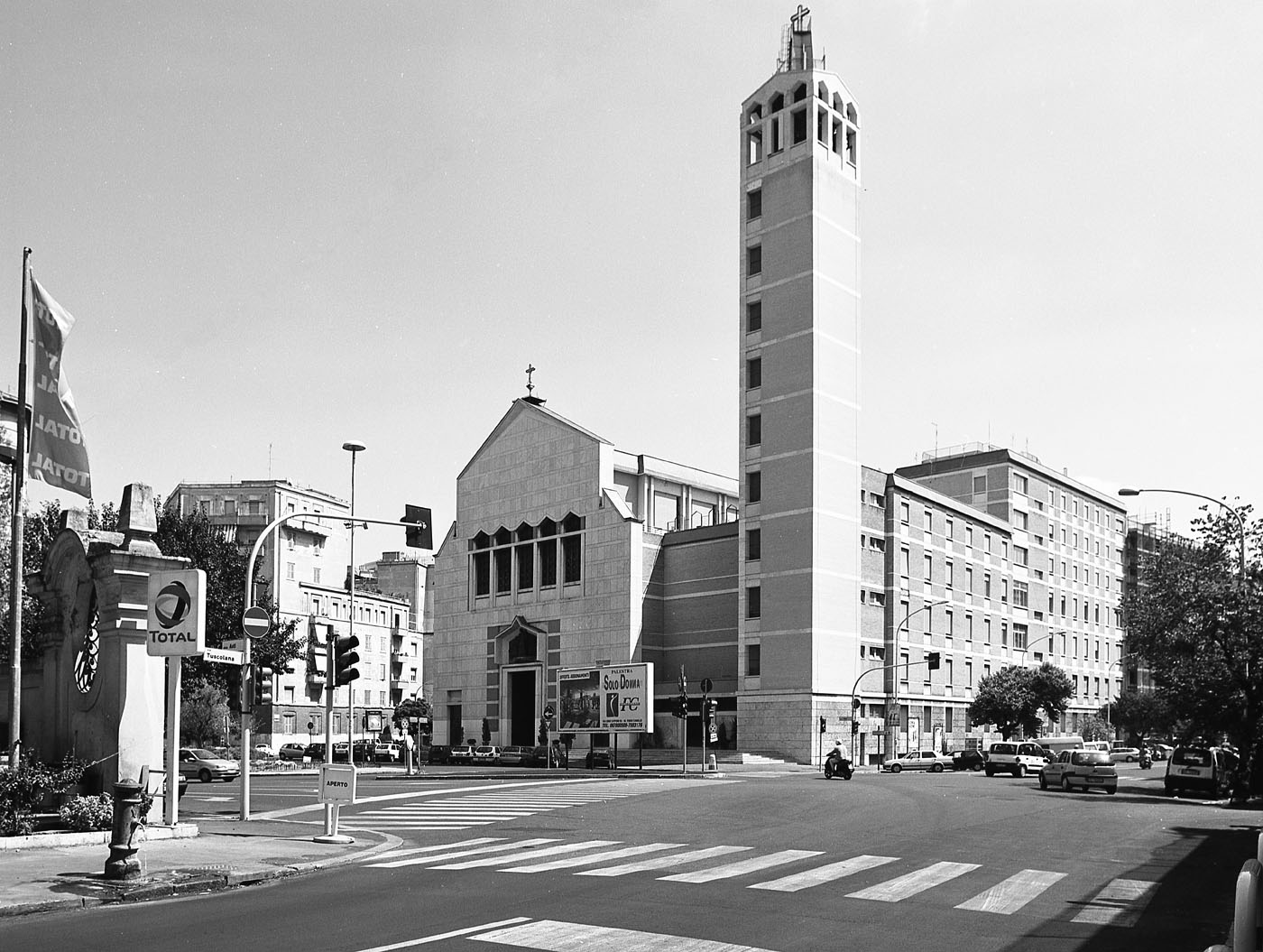
- Exterior view of Sant'Antonio da Padova in Via Tuscolana, August 2003
- Click on the map for a fullscreen view
- 41°52′53.24″N 12°31′12.28″E
- Location: Via Tuscolana, Rome
- Country: Italy
- Denomination: Latin Church
- Tradition: Roman Rite
- Website: Official website

History
- Status: Titular church
- Dedication: Annibale Maria di Francia, Anthony of Padua
- Consecrated: 1965

Architecture
- Architect: Raffaele Bocconi
- Architectural type: Church
- Groundbreaking: 1947
- Completed: 1948

Administration
- Province: Diocese of Rome

The Church of Saint Anthony of Padua on Via Tuscolana (Italian: Santi Antonio da Padova e Annibale Maria) is a Roman Catholic titular church in Rome, built for the religious congregation of the Rogationists of the Heart of Jesus, to whose founder Saint Annibale Maria di Francia is co-concercrated the church along with Saint Anthony of Padua. Having been completed in 1948 it was given to the Rogationists fathers, before being concercrated on 27 May 1965 by Cardinal Luigi Traglia. On 5 March 1973 Pope Paul VI granted it a titular church as a seat for Cardinals.

The most recent Cardinal Priest of this church is Jean Zerbo, Archbishop of Bamako.

== Architecture ==
The facade of the church has three doors, which are topped by five windows. The interior is constituted of three naves. The tabernacle is made of alabaster and bronze statues. The church is famous for having the highest bell tower in Rome at 47 meters.

Two plaques inside the church commemorate the visits of Pope Paul VI in 1974 and Pope John Paul II in 1979.

== List of Cardinal Priests ==
- Paulo Evaristo Arns (5 March 1973 – 14 December 2016)
- Jean Zerbo (from 28 June 2017)
