= N'Gara =

N'Gara may refer to:

- N'Garadougou, Koulikoro Region, Mali
- N'Gara, Ségou, Mali
