= N'Tobougou =

- Town
- Location in Mali
- Coordinates: 13°3′N 6°24′W
- Country: Mali
- Region: Koulikoro Region
- Cercle: Dioila Cercle
- Commune: Kilidougou
- Time zone: UTC+0 (GMT)

N'Tobougou is a small town and seat of the commune of Kilidougou in the Cercle of Dioila in the Koulikoro Region of south-western Mali.
