= Belekosoba =

- Town
- Country: Mali
- Region: Koulikoro Region
- Cercle: Dioila Cercle
- Commune: Diedougou
- Elevation: 1,001 ft (305 m)
- Time zone: UTC+0 (GMT)

Belekosoba is a small town and seat of the commune of Diedougou in the Cercle of Dioila in the Koulikoro Region of south-western Mali.

The estimated terrain elevation above sea level is 305 metres. Variant forms of spelling for Béléko-Soba or in other languages: Benkou, Bélékoro, Belekou, Béléko, Béléko-Soba, Benkou (fr), Belekou (fr), Bélékoro (fr), Béléko (fr), Beleko, Beleko-Soba, Belekoro, Belekou, Benkou, Béléko, Béléko-Soba, Bélékoro.
