= Benkadi =

Benkadi may refer to:

- Benkadi, Koulikoro, Mali
- Benkadi, Sikasso, Mali
