= Kotoula =

- Town
- Location in Mali
- Coordinates: 12°24′N 6°26′W
- Country: Mali
- Region: Koulikoro Region
- Cercle: Dioila Cercle
- Commune: Benkadi
- Time zone: UTC+0 (GMT)

Kotoula is a small town and seat of the commune of Benkadi in the Cercle of Dioila in the Koulikoro Region of south-western Mali.
