= Markacoungo attack =

2023 terrorist incident in Mali

- Part of Mali War
- Location: Marka Coungo, Koulikoro Region, Mali
- Date: January 2, 2023
- Deaths: 5
- Perpetrator: Jama'at Nasr al-Islam wal Muslimin

On January 2, 2023, militants from Jama'at Nasr al-Islam wal Muslimin attacked the villages of Markacoungo and Kassela, on the Bamako-Ségou highway, killing five civilians. The attack was the first by JNIM in the Bamako area in months.

== Prelude ==
Jama'at Nasr al-Islam wal Muslimin is an al-Qaeda-affiliated coalition of five jihadist groups that had rebelled against the Malian government in 2012, and unified in 2017. Normally, the group operates in northern and eastern Mali's Tombouctou Region, Mopti Region, and Gao Region, rarely ever extending southwards towards the Malian capital of Bamako. The last major attack near Bamako occurred at a police checkpoint in Zantiguila, a village in Ségou Region, in July 2022.

== Attack ==
Jihadists on motorcycles drove up to the town of Kassela around 9pm local time on January 2, and first attacked a toll booth. Markacoungo was attacked shortly afterward by unidentified gunmen, and the attackers shot at a civil defense post manned by civilians. The Malian Ministry of Security and Civil Defense stated two firefighters and three civilians were killed. The ministry later stated it was launching reprisal operations to find the gunmen. On January 5, JNIM claimed responsibility for the attacks.
