= Diocese of Ségou =

Roman Catholic diocese in Mali

Coordinates: 13.4398°N 6.2711°W

Diocese of Ségou Dioecesis Seguensis Diocèse Ségou
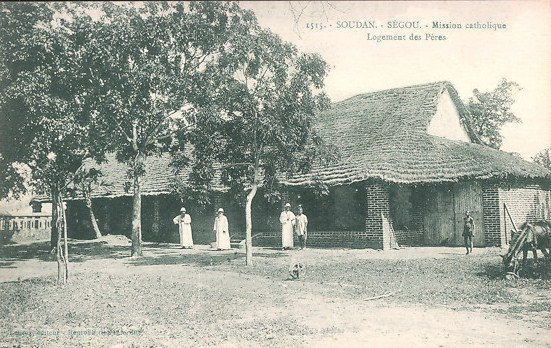
- Ségou, Catholic mission, Priest's residence

Location
- Country: Mali
- Ecclesiastical region: Archdiocese of Bamako
- Headquarters: Ségou

Statistics
- Area: 60,000 km^{2} (23,000 sq mi)
- Population: Total; Catholics: (as of 2023); 2,710,435; 28,370 (1.0%)
- Parishes: 6

Information
- Denomination: Catholic Church
- Sui iuris church: Latin Church
- Rite: Roman Rite
- Established: 10 March 1962; 64 years ago

Current leadership
- Pope: Leo XIV
- Bishop: Augustin Traoré
- Metropolitan Archbishop: Robert Cissé

The Roman Catholic Diocese of Ségou (Latin: Seguen(sis), French: Diocèse catholique romain de Ségou) is a diocese located in the city of Ségou in the ecclesiastical province of Bamako in Mali.

== History ==
- March 10, 1962: Established as Diocese of Ségou from the Metropolitan Archdiocese of Bamako

=== Bishops ===
- Bishops of Ségou (Roman rite)
  - Archbishop (personal title) Pierre Louis Leclerc, M. Afr. (1962.03.10 – 1974.07.01)
  - Bishop Mori Julien-Marie Sidibé (1974.07.01 – 2003.03.25)
  - Bishop Augustin Traoré (since 2003.10.30)

=== Other priests of this diocese who became bishops ===
- Joseph Dao, appointed Bishop of Kayes in 1978
- Jean Zerbo, appointed auxiliary bishop of Bamako in 1988; future Cardinal

== See also ==
- Roman Catholicism in Mali
