= Senou =

- Town
- Location in Mali
- Coordinates: 12°31′27″N 7°55′29″W
- Country: Mali
- Region: Koulikoro Region
- Cercle: Dioila Cercle
- Commune: Kemekafo
- Time zone: UTC+0 (GMT)

Senou is a small town and seat of the commune of Kemekafo in the Cercle of Dioila in the Koulikoro Region of south-western Mali.
