= Mena, Koulikoro =

Mena
- Town
- Location in Mali
- Coordinates: 12°13′N 6°12′W
- Country: Mali
- Region: Koulikoro Region
- Cercle: Dioila Cercle
- Commune: N'Dolondougou
- Time zone: UTC+0 (GMT)

Mena is a small town and seat of the commune of N'Dolondougou in the Cercle of Dioila in the Koulikoro Region of south-western Mali.
