= Falako =

- Town
- Location in Mali
- Coordinates: 12°34′8″N 7°11′2″W
- Country: Mali
- Region: Koulikoro Region
- Cercle: Dioila Cercle
- Commune: Tenindougou
- Time zone: UTC+0 (GMT)

Falako is a small town and seat of the commune of Tenindougou in the Cercle of Dioila in the Koulikoro Region of south-western Mali.
