= Tingole =

Town in Koulikoro Region, Mali

- Village
- Location in Mali
- Coordinates: 12.752°N 7.147°W
- Country: Mali
- Region: Koulikoro Region
- Cercle: Dioila Cercle
- Commune: Binko
- Time zone: UTC+0 (GMT)

Tingole is a town and seat of the commune of Binko in the Cercle of Dioila in the Koulikoro Region of south-western Mali.
