= Kilidougou =

- Commune
- Location in Mali
- Coordinates: 13°3′N 6°24′W
- Country: Mali
- Region: Koulikoro Region
- Cercle: Dioïla Cercle

Population (1998)
  - Total: 10,856
- Time zone: UTC+0 (GMT)

Kilidougou is a commune in the Cercle of Dioïla in the Koulikoro Region of south-western Mali. The principal town lies at N'Tobougou. In 1998 the commune had a population of 10,856.

The commune of Kilidougou was created by Act No. 96 on October 16, 1996. It is located east of the central district.
