= Tenindougou =

- Commune
- Location in Mali
- Coordinates: 12°34′8″N 7°11′2″W
- Country: Mali
- Region: Koulikoro Region
- Cercle: Dioïla Cercle

Population (1998)
  - Total: 14,756
- Time zone: UTC+0 (GMT)

Tenindougou is a commune in the Cercle of Dioïla in the Koulikoro Region of south-western Mali. The principal town lies at Falako. As of 1998 the commune had a population of 14,756.
