= Marka Coungo =

- Town
- Country: Mali
- Region: Koulikoro Region
- Cercle: Dioila Cercle
- Commune: Zan Coulibaly
- Time zone: UTC+0 (GMT)

Marka Coungo is a small town and seat of the commune of Zan Coulibaly in the Cercle of Dioila in the Koulikoro Region of south-western Mali.
