= Kemekafo =

- Commune
- Location in Mali
- Coordinates: 13°56′N 5°53′W
- Country: Mali
- Region: Koulikoro Region
- Cercle: Dioïla Cercle

Population (1998)
  - Total: 16,970
- Time zone: UTC+0 (GMT)

Kemekafo is a commune in the Cercle of Dioïla in the Koulikoro Region of south-western Mali. The principal town lies at Senou. As of 1998 the commune had a population of 16,970.
