= Dolendougou =

- Commune
- Location in Mali
- Coordinates: 12°34′N 6°30′W
- Country: Mali
- Region: Koulikoro Region
- Cercle: Dioïla Cercle
- Admin HQ (Chef-lieu): Dandougou

Area
  - Total: 356 km^{2} (137 sq mi)

Population (2009 census)
  - Total: 14,003
- Time zone: UTC+0 (GMT)

Dolendougou is a commune in the Cercle of Dioïla in the Koulikoro Region of south-western Mali. The main village (chef-lieu) is Dandougou.
