= Nangola =

- Commune and town
- Location in Mali
- Coordinates: 12°40′N 6°36′W
- Country: Mali
- Region: Koulikoro Region
- Cercle: Dioila Cercle

Population (1998)
  - Total: 12,642
- Time zone: UTC+0 (GMT)

Nangola is a small town and commune in the Cercle of Dioila in the Koulikoro Region of southern Mali. In 1998 the commune had a population of 12,642.
