= Diédougou, Dioïla =

Diedougou
- Commune
- Location in Mali
- Coordinates: 12.484°N 6.416°W
- Country: Mali
- Region: Koulikoro Region
- Cercle: Dioïla Cercle

Area
  - Total: 627 km^{2} (242 sq mi)

Population (2009 census)
  - Total: 39,021
  - Density: 62.2/km^{2} (161/sq mi)
- Time zone: UTC+0 (GMT)

Diédougou is a rural commune in the Cercle of Dioïla in the Koulikoro Region of south-western Mali. The commune contains 34 villages. The administrative center (chef-lieu) is at the village of Béléko Soba which lies 205 km east of Bamako. In the 2009 census the commune had a population of 39,021.
