= Zan Coulibaly =

- Commune
- Location in Mali
- Coordinates: 12°44′12″N 7°17′28″W
- Country: Mali
- Region: Koulikoro Region
- Cercle: Dioïla Cercle

Population (1998)
  - Total: 10,037
- Time zone: UTC+0 (GMT)

Zan Coulibaly is a commune in the Cercle of Dioïla in the Koulikoro Region of south-western Mali. The principal town lies at Marka Coungo. In 1998 the commune had a population of 10,037. The commune is known for its cotton industry.
