= Diebé =

- Commune and town
- Location in Mali
- Coordinates: 12°37′N 4°58′W
- Country: Mali
- Region: Koulikoro Region
- Cercle: Dioila Cercle

Population (1998)
  - Total: 5,958
- Time zone: UTC+0 (GMT)

Diebé is a small town and commune in the Cercle of Dioila in the Koulikoro Region of southern Mali. As of 1998 the commune had a population of 5958.
