= N'Dolondougou =

- Commune
- Location in Mali
- Coordinates: 12°13′N 6°12′W
- Country: Mali
- Region: Koulikoro Region
- Cercle: Dioïla Cercle

Population (1998)
  - Total: 14,756
- Time zone: UTC+0 (GMT)

N'Dolondougou is a commune in the Cercle of Dioïla in the Koulikoro Region of south-western Mali. The principal town lies at Mena. As of 1998 the commune had a population of 14,756.
