= Niantjila =

Coordinates: 11°47′51″N 6°32′41″W

- Commune and town
- Interactive map of Niantjila
- Country: Mali
- Region: Koulikoro Region
- Cercle: Dioila Cercle

Population (1998)
  - Total: 12,845
- Time zone: UTC+0 (GMT)

Niantjila is a small town and commune in the Cercle of Dioila in the Koulikoro Region of southern Mali.

== Demographics ==
As of 1998 the commune had a population of 12,845.
