= Jean-Gabriel Diarra =

Malian Roman Catholic bishop (1945–2019)

- Bishop of San
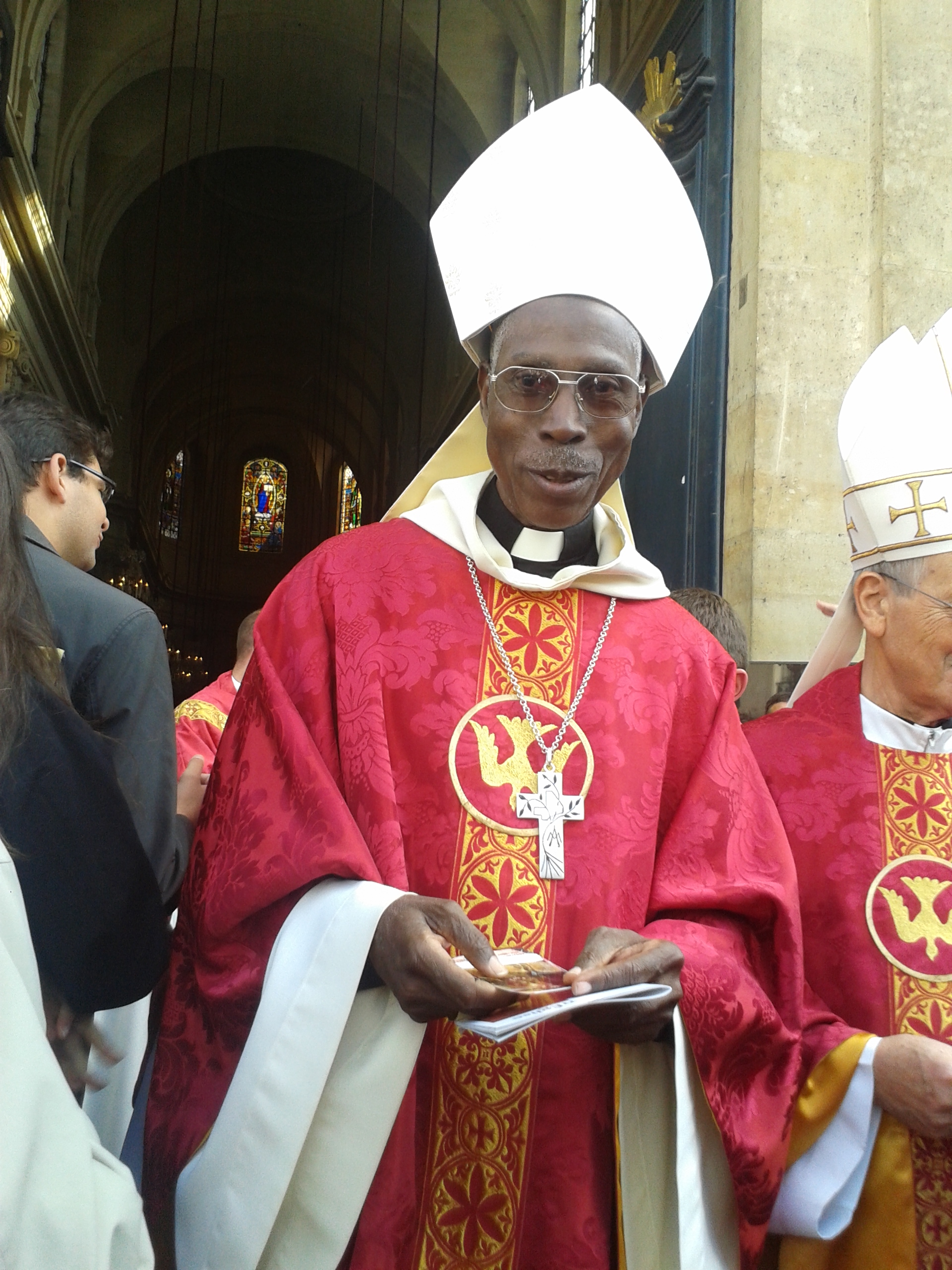
- Diarra in 2014
- Church: Catholic Church
- Diocese: Diocese of San
- In office: 18 November 1987 – 28 October 2019
- Predecessor: Joseph Paul Barnabé Perrot
- Successor: Hassa Florent Koné

Orders
- Ordination: 30 December 1972
- Consecration: 20 November 1988 by Jozef Tomko

Personal details
- Born: 12 July 1945 Vanekui, French Sudan, French West Africa, French Empire
- Died: 28 October 2019 (aged 74) Bamako, Mali

Jean-Gabriel Diarra (12 July 1945 – 28 October 2019) was a Malian Roman Catholic bishop.

Diarra was born in Mali and was ordained to the priesthood in 1972. He served as bishop of the Roman Catholic Diocese of San, Mali, from 1987 until his death in 2019.
