= Jèkafo =

Coordinates: 12°22′05″N 6°53′31″W

- Commune and town
- Interactive map of Jèkafo
- Country: Mali
- Region: Koulikoro Region
- Cercle: Dioila Cercle

Population (1998)
  - Total: 5,138
- Time zone: UTC+0 (GMT)

Jèkafo is a small town and commune in the Cercle of Dioila in the Koulikoro Region of southern Mali. As of 1998 the commune had a population of 5,138.

Radio Jèkafo operates in the area.
