= Diouman =

- Commune and village
- Location in Mali
- Coordinates: 12°35′50″N 7°18′22″W
- Country: Mali
- Region: Koulikoro Region
- Cercle: Dioila Cercle

Area
  - Total: 1,050 km^{2} (410 sq mi)

Population (2009 census)
  - Total: 22,018
- Time zone: UTC+0 (GMT)

Diouman or Dioumanzana is a village and commune in the Cercle of Dioila in the Koulikoro Region of southern Mali.
