= Degnekoro =

Dégnékoro
- Commune and village
- Location in Mali
- Coordinates: 12°21′N 6°40′W
- Country: Mali
- Region: Koulikoro Region
- Cercle: Dioila Cercle

Area
  - Total: 325 km^{2} (125 sq mi)

Population (2009 census)
  - Total: 9,464
  - Density: 29.1/km^{2} (75.4/sq mi)
- Time zone: UTC+0 (GMT)

Dégnékoro is a rural commune and village in the Cercle of Dioila in the Koulikoro Region of southern Mali.
