= Julien Mory Sidibé =

- Bishop of Ségou
- Church: Catholic Church
- Diocese: Diocese of Ségou
- In office: 1 July 1974 – 17 March 2003
- Predecessor: Pierre Louis Leclerc
- Successor: Augustin Traoré

Orders
- Ordination: 30 April 1957
- Consecration: 7 December 1974 by Luc Auguste Sangaré

Personal details
- Born: 1927 Goualala (northwest of Yanfolila), French Sudan, French West Africa, French Empire
- Died: 17 March 2003 (aged 75–76)

Styles of Julien Mory Sidibé
- Reference style: The Most Reverend
- Spoken style: Your Excellency
- Religious style: Monsignor
- Posthumous style: none

Julien Mory Sidibé (1927 – March 17, 2003) was a Roman Catholic bishop in Mali from 1974 until his death.

Born in the village of Goualala, Mali, Julien Mory Sidibé began his education at a local Catholic missionary school, later studying at the seminary at Goumi in Upper Volta (now Burkina Faso). In 1957, he was ordained a priest in Bougouni, Mali. or five years he directed the catechism school of Faladie, then that of Ntonimba.

In 1971, he began working on his dissertation in theology in France, and was soon informed by Luc Sangare, archbishop of Bamako, that he would be made a bishop on his return to Mali, a post Sidibé took in 1974. He is particularly remembered for a speech at Mali's 1991 National Conference in which he supported the country's transition to a more democratic political system.

He was Bishop of Ségou from 1974 until his death.
