= Wacoro =

Coordinates: 12°35′58″N 6°41′24″W

- Commune and town
- Interactive map of Wacoro
- Country: Mali
- Region: Koulikoro Region
- Cercle: Dioila Cercle

Population (1998)
  - Total: 9,706
- Time zone: UTC+0 (GMT)

Wacoro is a small town and commune in the Cercle of Dioila in the Koulikoro Region of southern Mali. As of 1998 the commune had a population of 9706.
