= Binko, Koulikoro =

Binko
- Commune
- Location in Mali
- Coordinates: 12.752°N 7.147°W
- Country: Mali
- Region: Koulikoro Region
- Cercle: Dioïla Cercle
- Admin HQ (Chef-lieu): Tingolé

Area
  - Total: 586 km^{2} (226 sq mi)

Population (2009 census)
  - Total: 19,894
  - Ethnicities: Bambara Fulani
- Time zone: UTC+0 (GMT)

Binko is a commune in the Cercle of Dioïla in the Koulikoro Region of south-western Mali. The main town (chef-lieu) is Tingolé.
