= Kerela, Mali =

Kerela
- Commune and town
- Location in Mali
- Coordinates: 12°21′N 6°40′W
- Country: Mali
- Region: Koulikoro Region
- Cercle: Dioila Cercle

Population (1998)
  - Total: 10,268
- Time zone: UTC+0 (GMT)

Kerela is a small town and commune in the Cercle of Dioila in the Koulikoro Region of southern Mali. In 1998 the commune had a population of 10,268.
