= N'Golobougou =

Coordinates: 12°10′24″N 6°42′32″W

- Commune and town
- Interactive map of N'Golobougou
- Country: Mali
- Region: Koulikoro Region
- Cercle: Dioila Cercle

Population (1998)
  - Total: 14,880
- Time zone: UTC+0 (GMT)

N'Golobougou is a small town and commune in the Cercle of Dioila in the Koulikoro Region of southern Mali. As of 1998 the commune had a population of 14,880.
