= Kaladougou =

Commune in Koulikoro Region, Mali

- Commune
- Location in Mali
- Coordinates: 12°29′N 6°48′W
- Country: Mali
- Region: Koulikoro Region
- Cercle: Dioïla Cercle

Population (1998)
  - Total: 22,949
- Time zone: UTC+0 (GMT)

Kaladougou is a commune in the Cercle of Dioïla in the Koulikoro Region of south-western Mali. The principal town lies at Dioïla. In 1998 the commune had a population of 22,949.

== See also ==
- List of cities in Mali
