= Benkadi, Koulikoro =

Benkadi
- Commune
- Location in Mali
- Coordinates: 12°24′N 6°26′W
- Country: Mali
- Region: Koulikoro Region
- Cercle: Dioïla Cercle
- Admin HQ (Chef-lieu): Kotoula

Area
  - Total: 159.84 km^{2} (61.71 sq mi)

Population (2009 census)
  - Total: 8,482
  - Density: 53.07/km^{2} (137.4/sq mi)
- Time zone: UTC+0 (GMT)

Benkadi is a rural commune in the Cercle of Dioïla in the Koulikoro Region of south-western Mali. The main village (chef-lieu) is Kotoula.
