= Diocese of San =

Roman Catholic diocese in Mali

Coordinates: 13.3014°N 4.8982°W

Diocese of San Dioecesis Sanensis Diocèse de San
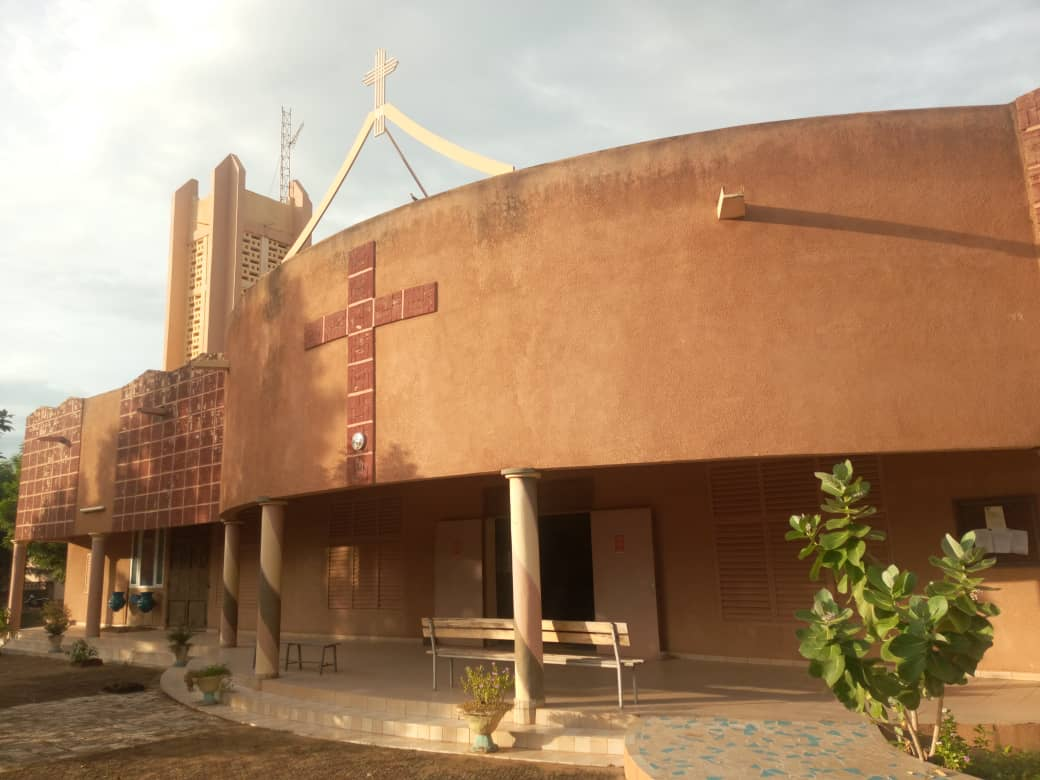
- Cathédrale Notre-Dame-de-Lourdes, in San

Location
- Country: Mali
- Metropolitan: Archdiocese of Bamako
- Headquarters: San, Ségou Region, Mali

Statistics
- Area: 20,550 km^{2} (7,930 sq mi)
- Population: Total; Catholics: (as of 2022); 1,356,500; 44,102 (3.3%)
- Parishes: 8

Information
- Denomination: Catholic Church
- Sui iuris church: Latin Church
- Rite: Roman Rite
- Established: 10 April 1962; 64 years ago
- Cathedral: Cathédrale Notre-Dame-de-Lourdes de San
- Secular priests: 39 (37 Diocesan, 2 Religious Orders)

Current leadership
- Pope: Leo XIV
- Bishop: Hassa Florent Koné
- Metropolitan Archbishop: Robert Cissé

The Roman Catholic Diocese of San (Latin: (sis), French: Diocèse catholique romain de San) is a diocese located in the city of San in the ecclesiastical province of Bamako in Mali.

== History ==
- 10 April 1962: Established as Mission “sui iuris” of San from Diocese of Nouna in Burkina Faso
- 29 September 1964: Promoted as Diocese of San

== Leadership ==
Superior of San (Roman Rite)

- Joseph Paul Barnabé Perrot, M. Afr. (10 April 1962 – 28 June 1962 see below)

Prefect of San (Roman Rite)

- Joseph Paul Barnabé Perrot, M. Afr. (see above 28 June 1962 – 29 September 1964 see below)

Bishops of San (Roman rite)

- Joseph Paul Barnabé Perrot, M. Afr. (see above 29 September 1964 – 18 November 1987), resigned
- Jean-Gabriel Diarra (18 November 1987 – 28 October 2019)
- Hassa Florent Koné (7 October 2021 – Present)

=== Other priest of this diocese who became bishop ===
- Jonas Dembélé (1992-2013), appointed Bishop of Kayes in 2013

== See also ==
- Roman Catholicism in Mali
