= Joseph Paul Barnabé Perrot =

Joseph Paul Barnabé Perrot M. Afr.
- Bishop of San
- Church: Catholic Church
- Diocese: Diocese of San
- In office: 10 April 1962 – 18 November 1987
- Predecessor: Mission established
- Successor: Jean-Gabriel Diarra

Orders
- Ordination: 1 February 1949
- Consecration: 9 January 1965 by Émile André Jean-Marie Maury

Personal details
- Born: 18 January 1921 Grand'Combe-des-Bois, Doubs, France
- Died: 22 June 2005 (aged 84)

Joseph Paul Barnabé Perrot (18 January 1921 – 22 June 2005) was a French Roman Catholic bishop in Mali.

Barnabé Perrot was born in France and was ordained to the priesthood in 1949. He served as the ecclesiastical superior from 1962 to 1964 of the mission of San and then served as the bishop of the Roman Catholic Diocese of San, Mali from 1964 until 1987.
