= Georges Fonghoro =

Roman Catholic bishop

Styles of Georges Fonghoro
- Reference style: The Most Reverend
- Spoken style: Your Excellency
- Religious style: Monsignor
- Posthumous style: none

Georges Fonghoro (June 30, 1958 – September 22, 2016) was the Roman Catholic bishop of the Roman Catholic Diocese of Mopti.

== Life ==
Born in 1958 in the Dogon village of Yele, he was educated in the seminary of Bamako and ordained priest in 1987 for the diocese of Mopti. From 1996 to 2000 he studied in Italy then he was named by Pope John Paul II bishop of Mopti. During his tenure as diocesan bishop he supported the construction of a Catholic hospital.
