= N'Garadougou =

- Commune and town
- Location in Mali
- Coordinates: 13°9′N 6°30′W
- Country: Mali
- Region: Koulikoro Region
- Cercle: Dioïla Cercle

Population (1998)
  - Total: 9,422
- Time zone: UTC+0 (GMT)

N'Garadougou or N'Gara is a town and commune in the Cercle of Dioïla in the Koulikoro Region of south-western Mali. As of 1998 the commune had a population of 9,422.
