= Diocese of Kayes =

Roman Catholic diocese in Mali

Coordinates: 14.4504°N 11.4376°W

Diocese of Kayes Dioecesis Kayesensis Diocèse de Kayes

Location
- Country: Mali
- Metropolitan: Archdiocese of Bamako
- Headquarters: Kayes, Kayes Region, Mali

Statistics
- Area: 166,000 km^{2} (64,000 sq mi)
- Population: Total; Catholics: (as of 2023); 2,125,900; 9,776 (0.5%)
- Parishes: 7

Information
- Denomination: Catholic Church
- Sui iuris church: Latin Church
- Rite: Roman Rite
- Established: 12 June 1947; 79 years ago
- Secular priests: 14 (11 Diocesan, 3 Religious Orders)

Current leadership
- Pope: Leo XIV
- Bishop: Jonas Dembélé
- Metropolitan Archbishop: Robert Cissé

The Roman Catholic Diocese of Kayes (Latin: Kayesen(sis), French: Diocèse catholique romain de Kayes) is a diocese located in the city of Kayes in the ecclesiastical province of Bamako in Mali.

On Thursday, 31 January 2013, Pope Benedict XVI appointed the Reverend Father Jonas Dembélé, up until then serving (as a member of the clergy of the Roman Catholic Diocese of San in San, Mali) as a pastor and as secretary of the National Union of Priests of Mali, as the bishop-elect of the Roman Catholic Diocese of Kayes, in Kayes, Mali, succeeding Bishop Joseph Dao, who retired in 2011.

== History ==
- 12 June 1947: Established as Apostolic Prefecture of Kayes from the Apostolic Vicariate of Bamako
- 6 July 1963: Promoted as Diocese of Kayes

== Leadership ==
Prefects Apostolic of Kayes (Roman rite)

- Etienne-Marie-Félix Courtois, M. Afr. (7 November 1947 – 6 July 1963 see below)

Bishops of Kayes (Roman rite)

- Etienne-Marie-Félix Courtois, M. Afr. (see above 6 July 1963 – 11 July 1978)
- Joseph Dao (12 September 1978 – 11 June 2011), retired
- Jonas Dembélé (31 January 2013 – Present)

=== Jonas Dembélé ===
The Rev. Fr. Jonas Dembélé was born on 15 May 1963, in Sokoura, Mali. After finishing primary and secondary school, he entered the Major Seminary of the Roman Catholic Archdiocese of Bamako, in Bamako, Mali, for courses in philosophy, and afterwards attended the Seminary of Koumi, Burkina Faso (in the Roman Catholic Archdiocese of Bobo-Dioulasso) for studies in theology. Bishop-designate Dembélé was ordained a priest on 12 July 1992. After ordination, he held the following positions: from 1992 to 1996: Vicar in the parish of Saint John Bosco of Touba, Mali; from 1996 to 2008: Pastor of the Cathedral of Notre Dame de Lourdes; from 2002 to 2008: Secretary General of the Union of the Clergy of the Roman Catholic Diocese of San and of the National Union of the Clergy of Mali (UPM); from 2008 to 2010: Studies at the Institute of Pastoral Theology Lumen Vitae in Brussels, Belgium, with a 'maitrise' in Practical Theology of Société et Dévelomment (Society and Development); since 2011: Pastor of the Parish of Yasso, Mali, which is under construction. He will be ordained a bishop and installed as Bishop of Kayes in separate ceremonies in the near future. (He was consecrated and installed on 11 May 2013.)

== See also ==
- Roman Catholicism in Mali

== Sources ==
- GCatholic.org
