= Joseph Dao =

Roman Catholic bishop

- Bishop of Kayes
- Church: Catholic Church
- Diocese: Diocese of Kayes
- In office: 12 September 1978 – 11 June 2011
- Predecessor: Etienne-Marie-Félix Courtois
- Successor: Jonas Dembélé

Orders
- Ordination: 26 June 1965
- Consecration: 27 January 1979 by Luc Auguste Sangaré

Personal details
- Born: 8 June 1936 Bobo-Dioulasso, Colony of Ivory Coast, French West Africa, French Empire
- Died: 23 October 2011 (aged 75)

Joseph Dao (8 June 1936 – 23 October 2011) was the Burkinabé-born Roman Catholic bishop of the Roman Catholic Diocese of Kayes, Mali.

Ordained to the priesthood in 1965, he became a bishop in 1978 retiring in 2011.
