= Massigui =

- Commune and town
- Location in Mali
- Coordinates: 11°52′N 6°46′W
- Country: Mali
- Region: Koulikoro Region
- Cercle: Dioila Cercle

Population (1998)
  - Total: 45,120
- Time zone: UTC+0 (GMT)

Massigui is a town and commune in the Cercle of Dioila in the Koulikoro Region of southern Mali. As of 1998 the commune had a population of 45,120.

== See also ==
- List of cities in Mali
