= Diocese of Sikasso =

Roman Catholic diocese in Mali

Coordinates: 11.3200°N 5.6732°W

Diocese of Sikasso Dioecesis Sikassensis Diocèse de Sikasso

Location
- Country: Mali
- Metropolitan: Archdiocese of Bamako
- Headquarters: Sikasso, Sikasso Region, Mali

Statistics
- Area: 47,950 km^{2} (18,510 sq mi)
- Population: Total; Catholics: (as of 2023); 2,401,000; 44,600 (1.9%)
- Parishes: 9

Information
- Denomination: Catholic Church
- Sui iuris church: Latin Church
- Rite: Roman Rite
- Established: 12 June 1947; 79 years ago
- Cathedral: Cathédrale Notre-Dame-de-Lourdes in Sikasso
- Secular priests: 29 (21 Diocesan, 8 Religious Orders)

Current leadership
- Pope: Leo XIV
- Bishop: Noël Bernard Coulibaly
- Metropolitan Archbishop: Robert Cissé

The Roman Catholic Diocese of Sikasso (Latin: Sikassen(sis), French: Diocèse catholique romain de Sikasso) is a diocese located in the city of Sikasso in the ecclesiastical province of Bamako in Mali.

== History ==
- 12 June 1947: Established as Apostolic Prefecture of Sikasso from the Apostolic Vicariate of Bobo-Dioulasso in Burkina Faso
- 6 July 1963: Promoted as Diocese of Sikasso

== Leadership ==
Prefect of Sikasso

- Didier Pérouse de Montclos, M. Afr. (17 October 1947 – 6 July 1963 see below)

Bishops of Sikasso

- Didier Pérouse de Montclos, M. Afr. (6 July 1963 – 8 July 1976), resigned
- Jean-Baptiste Maria Cissé (8 July 1976 – 3 November 1996)
- Jean-Baptiste Tiama (5 November 1998 – 27 March 2020), appointed Bishop of Mopti
  - Apostolic Administrator Jean-Baptiste Tiama (27 March 2020 – 11 February 2023), Bishop of Mopti
- Robert Cissé (14 December 2022 – 25 July 2024), appointed Archbishop of Bamako
  - Apostolic Administrator Robert Cissé (25 July 2024 – 4 July 2026), Archbishop of Bamako
- Noël Bernard Coulibaly (19 March 2026 – Present)

== See also ==
- Roman Catholicism in Mali
