= Diocese of Mopti =

Roman Catholic diocese in Mali

Coordinates: 14.5029°N 4.1962°W

The Roman Catholic Diocese of Mopti (Latin: Moptien(sis), French: Diocèse catholique romain de Mopti) is a diocese located in the city of Mopti in the ecclesiastical province of Bamako in Mali. After the death of bishop Georges Fonghoro, the diocese of Mopti is vacant. On 27 March 2020, Jean-Baptiste Tiama was appointed to this see, with no information yet about installation.

== History ==
- June 9, 1942: Established as Apostolic Prefecture of Gao from the Apostolic Vicariate of Bamako, the Apostolic Vicariate of Bobo-Dioulasso in Burkina Faso and the Apostolic Vicariate of Ouagadougou in Burkina Faso
- September 29, 1964: Promoted as Diocese of Mopti

== Leadership ==
- Prefects Apostolic of Gao (Roman rite)
  - Fr. Jean-Marie Lesourd, M. Afr. (1942.08.05 – 1947.10.17), appointed Prefect of Nouna; future Bishop
  - Fr. Pierre Louis Leclerc, M. Afr. (1947.10.17 – 1949.12.25), appointed titular bishop and Vicar Apostolic of Bamako; future Archbishop
  - Fr. Renato Landru, M. Afr. (1950.07.10 – 1964)
- Bishops of Mopti (Roman rite)
  - Bishop Georges Biard, M. Afr. (1964.09.29 – 1988.04.12)
  - Bishop Jean Zerbo (1994.12.19 – 1998.06.27), appointed Archbishop of Bamako (Cardinal in 2017)
  - Bishop Georges Fonghoro (1999.08.30 - 2016.09.22)
  - Bishop Jean-Baptiste Tiama (since 2020.03.27)

== See also ==
- Roman Catholicism in Mali
