= Banko, Mali =

Banko
- Commune and village
- Location in Mali
- Coordinates: 12°29′N 6°48′W
- Country: Mali
- Region: Dioïla Region
- Cercle: Dioïla Cercle

Area
  - Total: 911.64 km^{2} (351.99 sq mi)

Population (2009 census)
  - Total: 36,726
  - Density: 40.286/km^{2} (104.34/sq mi)
- Time zone: UTC+0 (GMT)

Banko (Bambara: ߓߊߣߞߏ tr. Banko) is a rural commune and village in the Cercle of Dioïla in the Dioïla Region of south-western Mali. The village lies on the Banifing River. The commune contains 31 villages.
