= Samo people =

Ethnic group native to West Africa

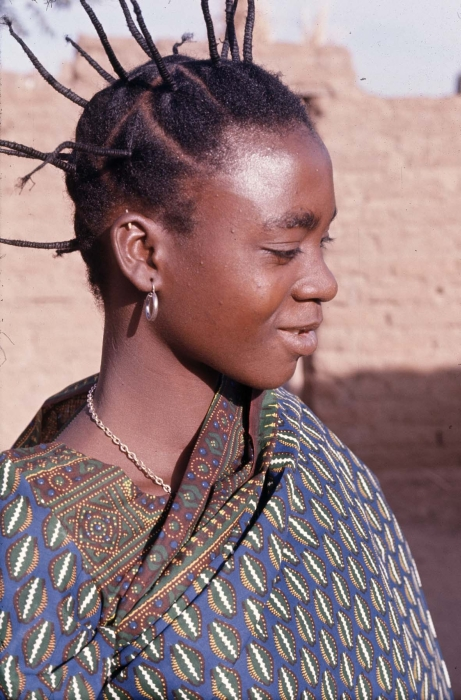
Portrait of a young Samo woman in Burkina Faso by Dutch anthropologist Jan Broekhuijse, 1970-1971. Collection Tropenmuseum.

The Samo (also Sanan) is a sub-ethnic group of the Mandinka people from West Africa. They mainly live in northwest Burkina Faso and across the border in southern Mali.

== See also ==
- Samo language (Burkina)
