= Robert Cissé =

Malian Catholic archbishop (born 1968)

The Most Reverend Robert Cissé
- Archbishop of Bamako, Mali
- Church: Catholic Church
- Archdiocese: Roman Catholic Archdiocese of Bamako
- See: Bamako
- Appointed: 25 July 2024
- Installed: 6 October 2024
- Predecessor: Jean Zerbo (27 June 1998 - 25 July 2024)
- Successor: Incumbent
- Previous post: Bishop of Sikasso (14 December 2022 - 25 July 2024)

Orders
- Ordination: 10 July 1993
- Consecration: 11 February 2023 by Cardinal Jean Zerbo

Personal details
- Born: Robert Cissé; 7 July 1968 (age 58) Bamako, Archdiocese of Bamako, Mali
- Motto: "Evangelii veritas" (The Truth of the Gospel)

Styles of Robert Cissé
- Reference style: His Grace; The Most Reverend
- Spoken style: Your Grace
- Religious style: Bishop

Robert Cissé (born 7 July 1968) is a Malian Catholic prelate who serves as the Archbishop of Bamako since 25 July 2024. Before that, from 14 December 2022 until 25 July 2024, he served as Bishop of Sikasso, Mali. He was appointed bishop by Pope Francis. He was consecrated at Sikasso, on 11 February 2023 by Cardinal Jean Zerbo, Archbishop of Bamako. The Holy Father transferred him to the Metroplolitan Province of Bamako and appointed him archbishop on 25 July 2024. He was installed at Bamako on 6 October 2024. While archbishop, he served as Apostolic Administrator of the Catholic Diocese of Sikasso from 25 July 2024 until 4 July 2026.

== Background and education ==
He was born on 7 June 1968 in Bamako, Mali. He studied philosophy at the Saint Augustin Major Seminary in Bamako. He then studied theology at the Saint Pierre Claver Major Seminary in Koumi, Burkina Faso. He also holds a doctorate in philosophy awarded by the Pontifical Urban University in Rome, Italy where he studied from 2012 until 2017.

== Priest ==
He was ordained a priest on 10 July 1993 in Koutiala for the Diocese of Sikasso. He served as a priest until 14 December 2022. While a priest, he served in various roles and locations, including:

- Parish vicar and parish priest of Sikasso from 1993 until 2000.
- Head of the diocesan Commission for Vocations from 1993 until 1998.
- Chaplain of the laity in Sikasso Catholic Diocese from 1997 until 1999.
- National director of the Pontifical Mission Societies in Mali from 2006 until 2009.
- Vicar general of Sikasso Catholic Diocese from 2005 until 2011.
- Studies in Rome, Italy at the Pontifical Urban University, leading to the award of a doctorate in philosophy from 2012 until 2017.
- Dean of the Faculty of Philosophy of the Catholic University of West Africa (French:fr:Université Catholique de l’Afrique de l’Ouest, in Abidjan, Ivory Coast from 2018 until 2022.
- Interim rector of the Saint Augustin Major Seminary in Bamako, Mali from 2021 until 2022.

== Bishop ==
On 14 December 2022, Pope Francis appointed Reverend Father Robert Cissé, previously a member of the clergy of Sikasso Catholic Dioccese as the Local Ordinary of that Catholic see. He received episcopal consecration at Sikasso on 11 February 2023 by the hands of Cardinal Jean Zerbo, Archbishop of Bamako assisted by Jean-Sylvain Emien Mambé, Titular Archbishop of Potentia in Piceno and Jean-Baptiste Tiama, Bishop of Mopti. He continues to minister to the faithful in his metropolitan province.

== See also ==
- Roman Catholicism in Mali

== Succession table ==
Catholic Church titles
Preceded by Jean Zerbo (27 June 1998 - 25 July 2024)	Archbishop of Bamako (since 25 July 2024)	Succeeded by (Incumbent)
Preceded by fr:Jean-Baptiste Tiama (5 November 1998 - 27 March 2020)	Bishop of Sikasso (14 December 2022 - 25 July 2024)	Succeeded by Noël Bernard Coulibaly (since 19 March 2026)
