= Archdiocese of Bamako =

Roman Catholic archdiocese in Mali

Coordinates: 12.6437°N 7.9994°W

Archdiocese of Bamako Archidioecesis Bamakoënsis Archidiocèse de Bamako
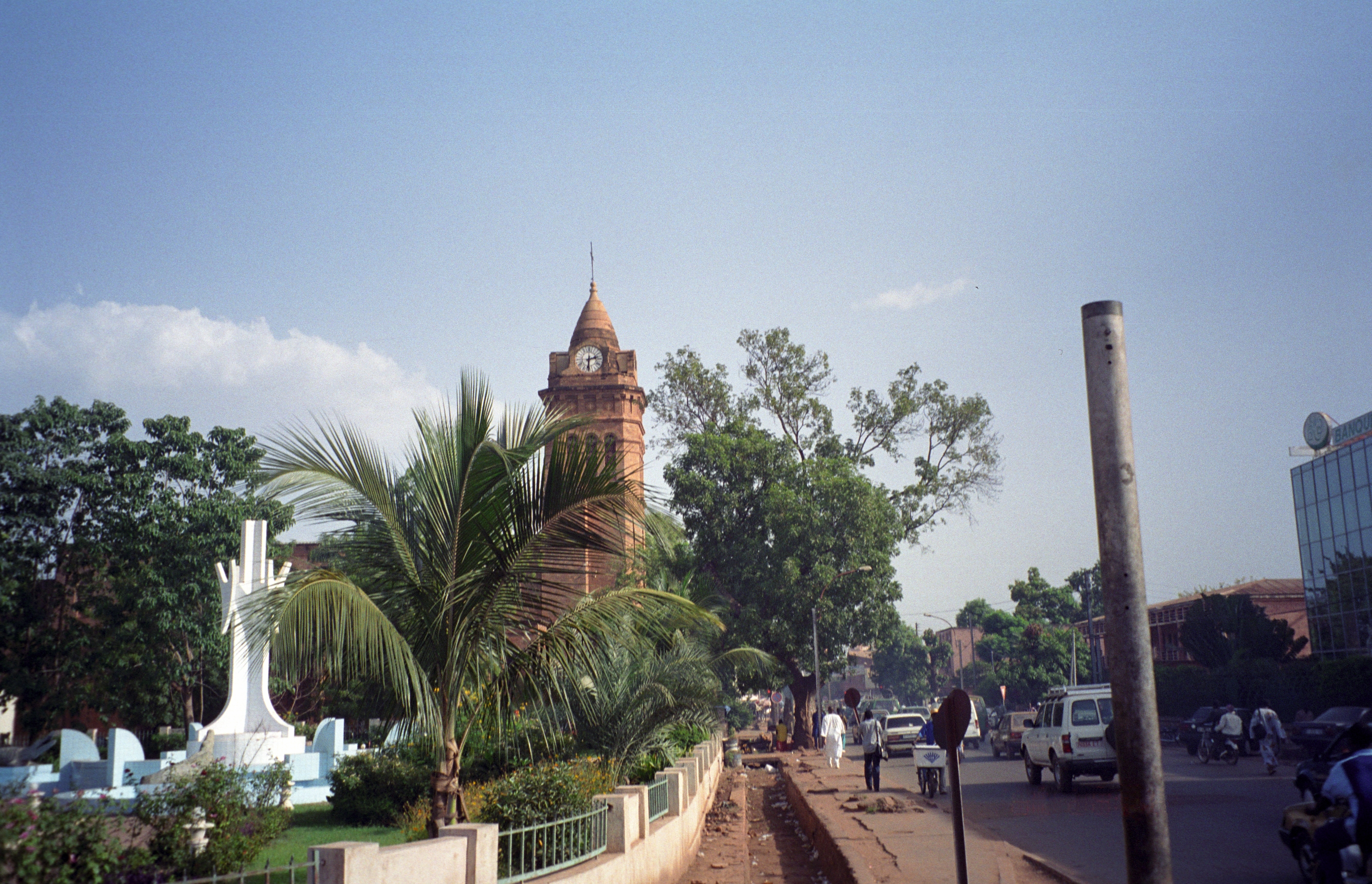
- Sacred Heart Cathedral, Bamako

Location
- Country: Mali
- Ecclesiastical province: Bamako

Statistics
- Area: 32,908 sq mi (85,230 km^{2})
- Population: Total; Catholics: (as of 2016); 4,650,549; 138,165 (3%)
- Parishes: 10

Information
- Denomination: Roman Catholic
- Rite: Roman Rite
- Established: 1868; 157 years ago
- Cathedral: Sacred Heart Cathedral
- Secular priests: 33

Current leadership
- Pope: Leo XIV
- Metropolitan Archbishop: Robert Cissé
- Bishops emeritus: Jean Zerbo

Website
- www.eglisemali.org/archidiocese-de-bamako

The Archdiocese of Bamako is the Metropolitan Archdiocesan See for the ecclesiastical province which covers all and only Mali. It depends on the missionary Roman Congregation for the Evangelization of Peoples.

The cathedral seat of the archbishop is the Cathédrale du Sacré-Cœur de Jésus, dedicated to the Sacred Heart of Jesus, in the national capital Bamako.

== Statistics ==
As of 2022, it pastorally served 284,436 Catholics (4.9% of 5,836,797 total) on 85,000 km² in 10 parishes and 1 mission with 41 priests (24 diocesan, 17 religious), 150 lay religious (35 brothers, 115 sisters).

== History ==
- 1868: Established as Apostolic Prefecture of Sahara and Sudan
- 1891: Promoted as Apostolic Vicariate of Sahara and Sudan, hence entitled to a titular bishop
- 19 July 1901: Renamed the Apostolic Vicariate of French Sudan (the French colonial name of Mali)/Sahara nel Sudan Francese (Curiate Italian) / Saharen(sis) (Latin adjective), having lost territory to establish the Apostolic Prefecture of Ghardaïa
- 2 July 1921: Renamed the Apostolic Vicariate of Bamako / Bamakoën(sis) (Latin adjective), having lost territory to establish Apostolic Vicariate of Ouagadougou (in Upper Volta, the French colonial name of Burkina Faso)
- Lost territory repeatedly: on 1927.12.15 to establish Apostolic Prefecture of Bobo-Dioulasso, on 1937.03.09 to establish Apostolic Prefecture of N’Zérékoré, on 1942.06.09 to establish Apostolic Prefecture of Gao (now its suffragan) and on 1947.06.12 to establish Apostolic Prefecture of Kayes (now its suffragan)
- 14 September 1955: Promoted as the Metropolitan Archdiocese of Bamako / Bamakoën(sis) (Latin adjective)
- Lost territory again on 1962.03.10 to establish as its suffragan the Diocese of Ségou
- It received a papal visit from Pope John Paul II in January 1990.

== Ecclesiastical province ==
The Metropolitan's suffragan sees are the:

- Roman Catholic Diocese of Kayes
- Roman Catholic Diocese of Mopti
- Roman Catholic Diocese of San
- Roman Catholic Diocese of Ségou
- Roman Catholic Diocese of Sikasso

== Bishops ==
Apostolic Prefect of Sahara and Sudan

- Bishop Charles Lavigerie, M Afr (1868 – 13 March 1891 see below) (Cardinal in 1882); this tenure as Apostolic Prefect is not listed in Catholic-hierarchy

Apostolic Vicars of Sahara and Sudan

- Cardinal Charles Lavigerie, M Afr (see above 13 March 1891 – 26 November 1892)
- Anatole-Joseph Toulotte, M Afr (26 November 1892 – 18 October 1897)
- Augustin Prosper Hacquard, M Afr (19 January 1898 – no April 1901)

Apostolic Vicars of French Sudan

- Hippolyte Louis Bazin, M Afr (27 July 1901 – 30 November 1910)
- Alexis Lemaître, M Afr (24 February 1911 – 28 July 1920), appointed Coadjutor Archbishop of Carthage, Tunisia

Apostolic Vicars of Bamako

- Emile-Fernand Sauvant, M Afr (8 July 1921 – 6 April 1928)
- Paul-Marie Molin, M Afr (2 July 1928 – 21 January 1949)
- Pierre Louis Leclerc, M Afr (25 December 1949 – 14 September 1955)

Archbishops of Bamako

- Pierre Louis Leclerc, M Afr (14 September 1955 – 10 March 1962), appointed Archbishop (personal title) of Ségou
- Luc Auguste Sangaré (10 March 1962 – 11 February 1998)
- Jean Zerbo (27 June 1998 – 25 July 2024) (Cardinal in 2017)
- Robert Cissé (25 July 2024 - )

Auxiliary Bishops

- Jean Zerbo (1988-1994), appointed Bishop of Mopti; later returned as archbishop; later cardinal

== See also ==
- Catholic Church in Mali
- List of Catholic dioceses in Mali

== Sources and external links ==
- GCatholic.org - data for all sections
