= Islam in Mali =

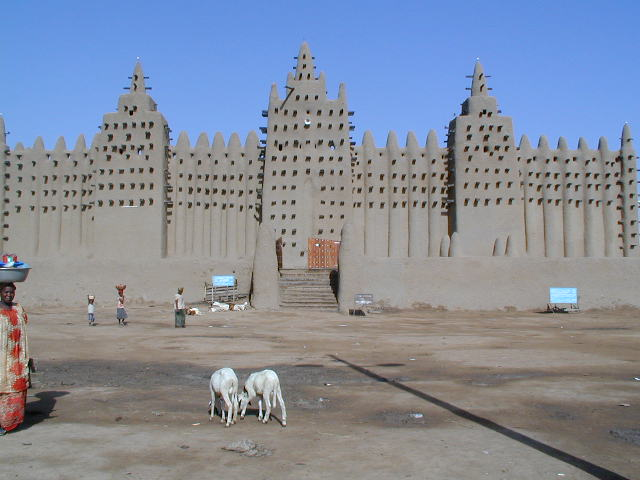
The Great Mosque of Djenné, the largest mud brick building in the world, is considered the greatest achievement of the Sudano-Sahelian architectural style. The first mosque on the site was built in the 13th century; the current structure dates from 1907. Along with the city of Djenné, it was designated a World Heritage site by UNESCO

Muslims make up approximately 95 percent of the population of Mali. The majority of Muslims in Mali are Non denominational and Malikite Sunni, influenced with Sufism. Ahmadiyya and Shia branches are also present.

Islam has been present in West Africa for over a millennium, and Mali has been the center of various Islamic empires, such as the Ghana Empire and the Songhai Empire. Mali was a French colony and now follows the secular French model in which the government does not intervene in religious matters.

Islam as practiced in the country until recently was reported to be relatively tolerant and adapted to local conditions. Women participated in economic and political activity, engaged in social interaction, and generally did not wear veils. Islam in Mali has absorbed mystical elements, ancestor veneration and the African Traditional Religion that still thrive. Many aspects of Malian traditional society encourage norms consistent with democratic citizenship, including tolerance, trust, pluralism, the separation of powers and the accountability of the leader to the governed.

There has been a surge in conservative interpretations of Islam in recent decades, particularly in Northern Mali where extremist groups have targeted religious minorities with violence. Despite this surge, many Muslim leaders have argued against the imposition of Sharia law. Christian missionaries have not observed any discrimination against Christians or other minorities in areas under government control, and have reported that the government has continued to adhere to the constitutional requirement to treat all religions equally.

== History ==
During the 9th century, Muslim Berber and Tuareg merchants helped to spread the religion of Islam in the region, with the founders of the Sufi brotherhoods (tariqah) playing an instrumental role. Conversion to Islam connected the West African savannah through belief in one God and similar new forms of political, social and artistic characteristics. Cities including Timbuktu, Gao and Kano soon became international centers of Islamic learning.

The most significant of the Mali kings was Mansa Musa (1312–1337), who expanded Mali's influence over the large Niger city-states of Timbuktu, Gao, and Djenné. Mansa Musa was a devout Muslim who was reported to have built various major mosques throughout the Mali sphere of influence; his gold-laden pilgrimage to Mecca made him a well-known figure in the historical record.

== Muslims in Mali ==
Relations between the Muslim majority and the Christian and other religious minorities—including practitioners of African Traditional Religion were reported to be generally stable until recently, although there have been several cases of instability and tension in the past. It is relatively common to find adherents of a variety of faiths within the same family. Many followers of one religion usually attend religious ceremonies of other religions, especially weddings, baptisms, and funerals.

Since the imposition of Sharia rule in northern parts of the country in 2012, persecution of Christians in the north has increased significantly and has been described as severe by the Missionaries of Open Doors which publishes the Christian persecution index; Mali appeared as number 7 in the 2013 index list.

The implementation of Sharia in the rebel-controlled north has included the banning of music, cutting off the hands or feet of thieves, stoning of adulterers, and public whippings of smokers, alcohol drinkers, and improperly dressed women. Several Islamic sites in Mali have been destroyed or damaged by vigilante activists linked to Al Qaeda extremists who have claimed that the sites represent "idol worship".

Some foreign Islamic preachers operate in the north of the country, while mosques associated with Dawa (an Islamist group) are located in Kidal, Mopti, and Bamako. The organization Dawa has gained adherents among the Bellah, who were once the slaves of the Tuareg nobles, and also among unemployed youth. The interest these groups have in Dawa is based on a desire to disassociate themselves from their former masters, and to find a source of income. The Dawa sect has a strong influence in Kidal, while the Wahabi movement has been reported to be steadily growing in Timbuktu. The country's traditional approach to Islam is relatively moderate, as reflected in the ancient manuscripts from the former University of Timbuktu.

In August 2003, a conflict erupted in the village of Yerere in Western Mali when traditional Sunni practitioners attacked Wahhabi Sunnis, who were building an authorized mosque.

== Status of religious freedom ==
The constitution provides for freedom of religion and does not permit any form of religious discrimination or intolerance by the government or individual persons. There is no state religion as the constitution defines the country as a secular state and allows for religious practices that do not pose a threat to social stability and peace.

The government requires that all public associations, including religious associations, register with the government. However, registration confers no tax preference and no other legal benefits, and failure to register is not penalized in practice. Traditional indigenous religions are not required to register.

A number of foreign missionary groups operate in the country without government interference. Both Muslims and non-Muslims are allowed to convert people freely.

Family law, including laws pertaining to divorce, marriage, and inheritance, is based on a mixture of local tradition and Islamic law and practice.

During presidential elections held in April and May 2002, the Government and political parties emphasized the secularity of the state. A few days prior to the elections, a radical Islamic leader called on Muslims to vote for former Prime Minister Ibrahim Boubacar Keïta. The High Council of Islam, the most senior Islamic body in the country, severely criticized the statement and reminded all citizens to vote for the candidate of their choice.

In January 2002, the High Council was created to coordinate religious affairs for the entire Muslim community and standardize the quality of preaching in mosques. All Muslim groups in the country currently recognize its authority.

== Extremism ==
Extremists have been responsible for some reprehensible acts in Mali, most notably what has been nicknamed the Battle of Gao, in which an Islamic extremist group, Ansar Dine began to destroy various Muslim World Heritage Sites. The most significant of these was the Islamic mausoleum of Sidi Mahmoud Ben Amar and in mausoleums around the capital, including that of Sidi Yahya, militants broke in and destroyed Muslim tombs.

Many towns in Mali are falling victim to extremist groups’ implementation of their sect's interpretation of Sharia law. A recent report in The Guardian revealed that extremist groups have banned music in certain regions and were known to turn up randomly in villages, armed with weaponry, to burn musical instruments and musical items on bonfires. One guitarist was threatened that his fingers would be chopped off if he ever showed his face in one town again. On 18 May 2017, a man and a woman were stoned to death for living maritally without being married. According to officials, the extremists first dug two holes, one for the man and the other for the woman, then the couple was buried up to their necks and then four extremists started throwing stones on them and continued throwing until they died from their wounds. The public were invited to take part in this stoning. The couple was accused of violating Islamic law by living together without marriage.

== See also ==
- Islam by country
