= Catholic Church in Mali =

The Catholic Church in Mali is part of the worldwide Catholic Church (particularly the Latin Church), under the spiritual leadership of the Pope in Rome.

== Demographics ==
In 2020, it was estimated that Christians made up 2.35% of the country's population; over half of these were Catholic. However, other figures suggested that Catholics made up 2.54% of the country, or almost half a million people.

In the same year, there were 177 priests and 275 nuns serving across 48 parishes.

== Dioceses ==
There are seven dioceses in Mali; six are Roman Rite and one belongs to the Maronite Church.

- Archdiocese of Bamako
  - Diocese of Kayes
  - Diocese of Mopti
  - Diocese of San
  - Diocese of Ségou
  - Diocese of Sikasso

== Cardinal ==
Jean Zerbo is the first cardinal from Mali; he was raised to the rank of cardinal at a consistory on 28 June 2017. He was previously the Archbishop of Bamako.

== See also ==
- Religion in Mali
