= Dioïla Cercle =

Coordinates: 12.490°N 6.789°W

Dioïla
- Cercle
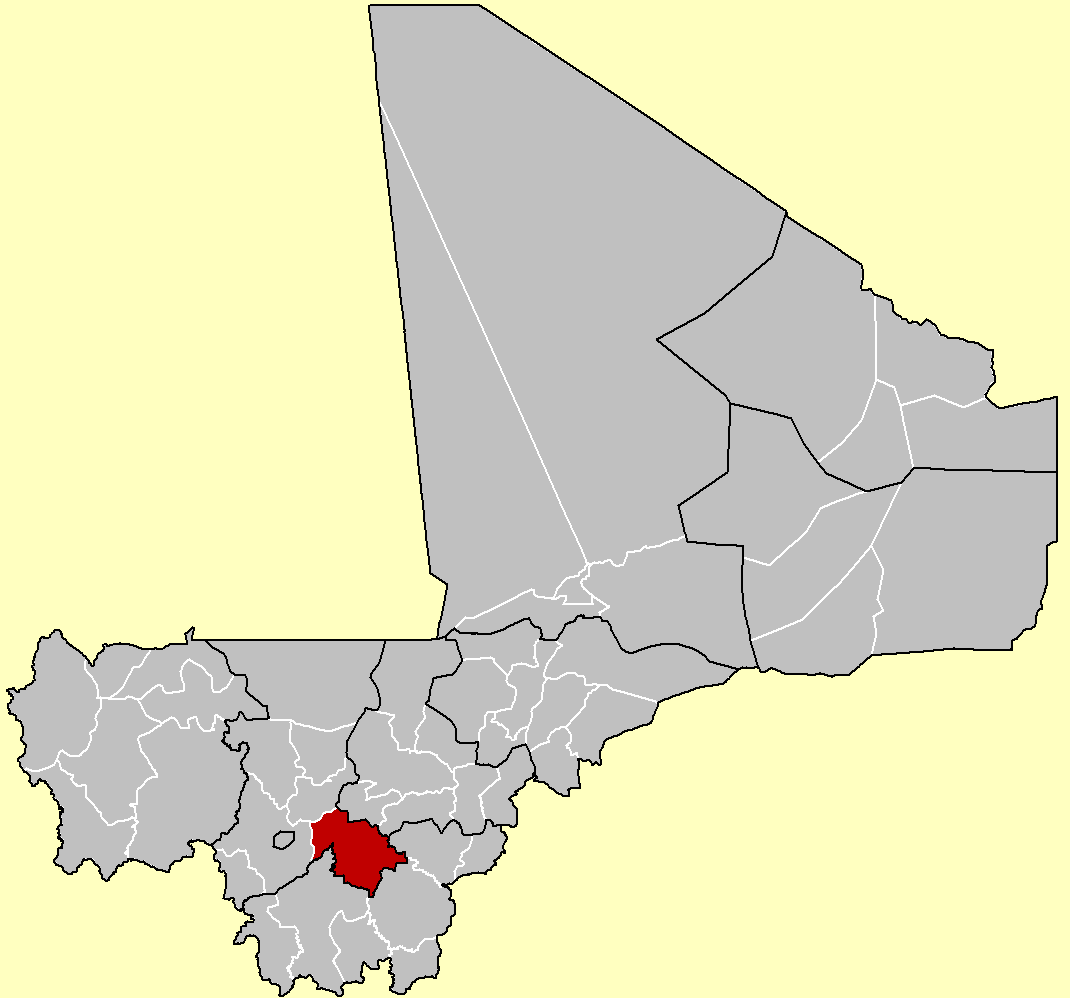
- Location of Dioïla Cercle in Mali
- Country: Mali
- Region: Koulikoro Region
- Capital: Dioïla

Area
  - Total: 12,794 km^{2} (4,940 sq mi)

Population (2009 census)
  - Total: 249,403
  - Density: 19.494/km^{2} (50.489/sq mi)
- Time zone: UTC+0 (GMT)

Dioïla Cercle is an administrative subdivision of the Koulikoro Region of Mali. Its seat is the town of Dioïla. It lies at the southeast corner of the region, and prior to 1977, it was combined with what is now Kati Cercle and the District of Bamako in the "Bamako Cercle", with the capital city as its seat.

The Dioïla Cercle is divided into 23 communes:

- Banco
  (containing the town of Dioïla)
- Benkadi
- Binko
- Dégnékoro
- Diébé
- Diédougou
- Diouman
- Dolendougou
- Guégnéka
- Jékafo
- Kaladougou
- Kémékafo
- Kéréla
- Kilidougou
- Massigui
- N'Dlondougou
- N'Garadougou
- N'Golobougou
- Nangola
- Niantjila
- Ténindougou
- Wacoro
- Zan Coulibaly

Dioïla Cercle is home to primarily Bambara and Malinke farmers, and formed part of the pre-colonial Bambara Empire. Because of this, and its rural character, Animism persisted in this area well into the 20th century. There are also populations of Muslim Maraka, Fula, and Bozo fishing communities. The Cercle falls largely south of the dryer Sahel land, in the wetter Sudan. It is also home to the headwaters of the Bani River.
