= Ijo =

Ijo may refer to:

- Ijo Temple, a 10th-century Hindu temple in Yogyakarta, Indonesia
- A subgroup of the Ijaw people of Nigeria, Africa
  - Ijoid languages (or Ịjọ), spoken by the Ijo people
    - Southeast Ijo, an Ijaw language
- Ii, Finland (Swedish: Ijo), a municipality in Finland

== As an acronym ==
- Islamic Jihad Organization
- International Journal of Obesity
