= Defaka people =

Defaka
Total population
- Fewer than a thousand people

Regions with significant populations
- Nigeria.

Languages
- Defaka

The Defaka (called Afakani by their neighbours, the Nkoroo) are a small ethnic group of south-eastern Nigeria, numbering fewer than a thousand people. They live in the eastern part of the Niger Delta, Rivers State, Bonny District; part of them in the Defaka ward of Nkoroo town in close relationship with the Nkoroo people, and another part of them on the isolated island of Iwoma Nkoro, near Kono. Present neighbours of the Defaka, apart from the Nkoroo people, are: at Iwoma, the Ogoni people (speakers of Ogoni/Kana/Khana), and to the east, the Obolo. The Defaka have a less cordial relationship with these peoples than with the Nkoroo.

The Defaka language is thought to be most closely related to the Ijo languages, which is the basis for the Ijoid language family first proposed by Jenewari (1983). Defaka is being rapidly pushed to extinction as speakers are shifting to the language of the Nkoroo people. All Defaka people speak Nkoroo; most use it as their primary language, even when talking with other Defaka speakers. At most 200 speakers of Defaka are left, mostly elderly people; as such, the language may already be moribund (or nearly so).

== History ==
The Defaka have always been a people small in number, and their history is a long narrative of harassment by numerically superior neighbours and subsequent migrations. According to oral histories reported in Jenewari (1983), the original home of the Defaka was in the Iselema area (present-day Delta State). From there, they moved via the Central Delta into the Eastern Delta region, where they lived close to the Abuloma ethnic group. Later they lived close to the Udekama (Degema) people in the Engenni area, and subsequently they entered the Bonny territory to live at Abalama Olotombia, and later near Bodo in Ogoni. They moved to Iyoba in the Andoni country before establishing Olomama Nkoroo (Old town). From there, they finally moved to the present-day Nkoroo town. The Nkoroo people, neighbours of the Defaka and numbering about 4500, relate a similar tradition of migration. Thus, the Defaka and Nkoroo peoples have presumably been living together as neighbours prior to the establishment of Nkoroo town, perhaps even since the time that both of them were in the Okrika territory.

== See also ==
- Demographics of Nigeria#Ethnic groups
- Niger#Ethno-linguistic groups
