= Defaka =

Defaka may refer to:

- the Defaka people
- the Defaka language
