= Oruma language =

Inland Ijaw language of Nigeria

Oruma
- Native to: Nigeria
- Region: Rivers State; Bayelsa State
- Native speakers: (5,000 cited 1995)
- Language family: Niger–Congo?: Ijoid; Ijaw; West; Inland; Oruma

Language codes
- ISO 639-3: orr
- Glottolog: orum1241
- ELP: Oruma

Oruma is one of three small Inland Ijaw languages of Nigeria. According to Ethnologue, it is not fully intelligible with other varieties of Inland Ijaw.
