= Biseni language =

Coastal language of Nigeria

Biseni
- Native to: Nigeria
- Region: Rivers State
- Ethnicity: Buseni
- Native speakers: (4,800 cited 1977)
- Language family: Niger–Congo?: Ijoid; Ijaw; West; Inland; Biseni

Language codes
- ISO 639-3: ije
- Glottolog: bise1238
- ELP: Biseni

Biseni (Buseni) is one of the coastal languages of Nigeria. According to Ethnologue, it is not fully intelligible with Inland Ijaw.
