= OKD (disambiguation) =

OKD is a Czech mining company.

OKD or okd may also refer to:

- OKD, IATA code for Okadama Airport in Japan
- OKD (software), an open source application container platform related to Red Hat OpenShift
- ISO 639:okd, the standard code for Okodia language of Nigeria
