= Shelter =

Architectural structure providing protection

A shelter is an architectural structure or natural formation (or a combination of the two) providing protection from the local environment. A shelter can serve as a home or be provided by a residential institution. It can be understood as both a temporary and a permanent structure. In the American Counterculture of the 1960s, the concept of "Shelter" intervenes as one of the key concepts of the Whole Earth Catalog, and expresses an alternative to the modes of teaching architecture practiced in American academies.

In the context of Maslow's hierarchy of needs, shelter holds a crucial position as one of the fundamental human necessities, complementing other physiological needs such as air, water, food, clothing, sleep, and reproduction.

== Types ==
Forms

- Apartment
- Bivouac shelter
- Blast shelter
- Bunker
- Fallout shelter
- House
- Hut
- Lean-to
- Mia-mia, Indigenous Australian for a temporary shelter
- Quinzhee, a shelter made from a hollow mound of loose snow
- Ramada, a roof with no walls
- Rock shelter
- Shack
- Tent
- Toguna, a shelter used by the Dogon people in Africa
- Townhouse
- Tree house

Applications

- Air raid shelter
- Animal shelter
- Bothy, public supply shelter in the British Isles
- Bus stop
- Emergency shelter
- Homeless shelter
- Housing unit
- Mountain hut
- Refugee shelter
- Transitional shelter
- Women's shelter

== Gallery ==
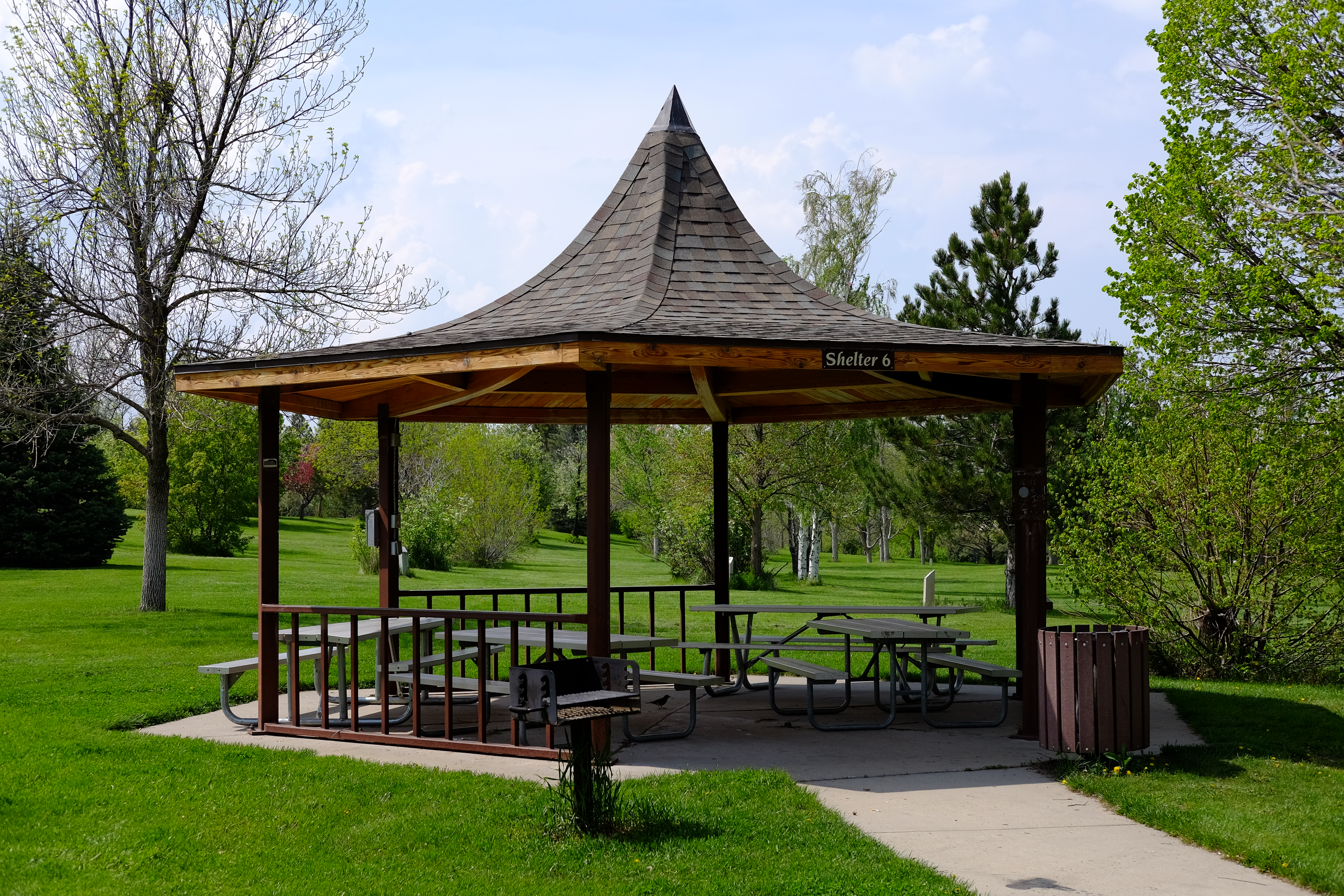
Picnic shelter in Gillette, Wyoming

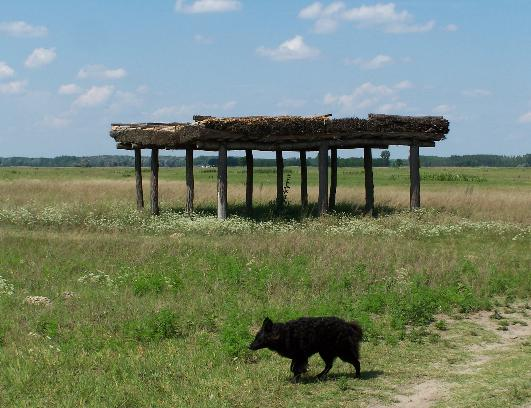
Bugac puszta, Hungary, with animal shelter and mudi

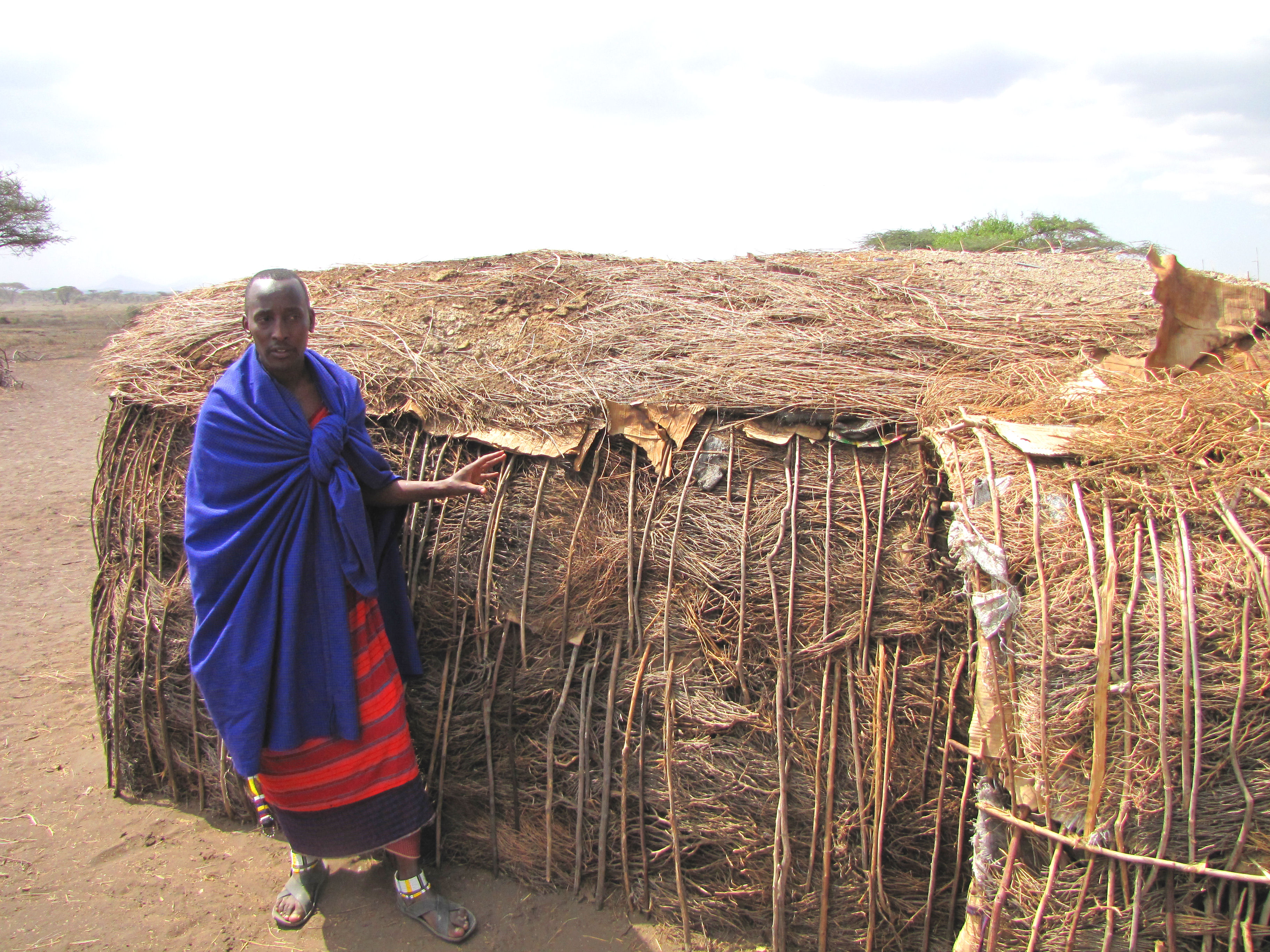
Maasai shelter, Ngorongoro Conservation Area, Tanzania

== See also ==
- List of human habitation forms
- Right to housing
