= Ijaw =

Ijaw may refer to:

- Ijaw people
- Ijaw languages
