= Skid Robot =

Graffiti artist

Skid Robot is the pseudonym of an unidentified Los Angeles–based street artist who uses graffiti art to present social messages with a focus on homelessness and poverty in the area known as Skid Row. Skid Robot spray paints images of household items, especially bedding and bedroom furniture, in areas where homeless people sleep or congregate in an effort to highlight their lack of household possessions and shelter.

The artists promotes his work almost exclusively on image sharing social media site Instagram, directing visitors to associated crowd-funding sites used to raise money to support those who appear in his art.
