= Kalabari language =

Ijo language spoken in Nigeria

Kalabari
- Ibani–Kalabari–Kirike
- Native to: Nigeria
- Region: Rivers State
- Ethnicity: Kalabari, Ibani
- Native speakers: (570,000 cited 1989–1995)
- Language family: Niger–Congo?: Ijoid; Ijaw; East; Kalabari
- Dialects: Kalabari; Ibani (Bonny)

Language codes
- ISO 639-3: Variously: ijn – Kalabari iby – Ibani okr – Kirike
- Glottolog: kaki1246
- ELP: Kalabari
- Kirike

Kalabari is an Ijo language of Nigeria spoken in Rivers State and Bayelsa State by the Awome people. Its three dialects are mutually intelligible. The Kalabari dialect (Kalabari proper) is one of the best-documented varieties of Ijo, and as such is frequently used as the prime example of Ijo in linguistic literature.

As of 2005, the language, "spoken by 258,000 people, [was] endangered largely because of the massive relocation that has taken place in the area due to the development of Nigeria's oil industry in the Port Harcourt region."

Berbice Creole Dutch, a recently extinct Dutch Creole formerly spoken in Eastern Guyana, was spoken by descendants of Kalabari speakers. The African element in Berbice Dutch is predominantly Kalabari in origin.

Kalabari-language words have been proposed for some modern technical terms.

== Dialects ==
Kalabari is spoken south of Port Harcourt.

Ibani is spoken southeast of Port Harcourt, in the Bonny local government area and in Opobo.

Kirike is spoken in Port Harcourt and the local government areas of Okrika and Ogu–Bolo.

== Phonology ==
Consonants
		Labial	Alveolar	Palatal	Velar	Labiovelar	Labial–velar	Glottal
Plosive	voiceless	p	t		k	kʷ ⟨kw⟩	kp ⟨kp⟩	
Plosive	voiced	b	d		ɡ ⟨g⟩	ɡʷ ⟨gw⟩	ɡb ⟨gb⟩	
Implosive		ɓ ⟨ḅ⟩	ɗ (Note: Specific to Kirike) ⟨ḍ⟩					
Nasal		m	n	ɲ (Note: Specific to Ibani) / j̃ ⟨ny⟩	ŋ ⟨ñ⟩	ŋʷ / w̃ ⟨nw⟩		
Affricate	voiceless			tʃ ⟨ch⟩				
Affricate	voiced			dʒ ⟨j⟩				
Fricative	voiceless	f	s					h ~ ɦ (Note: Harry (2003) notes orthographic ⟨h⟩ as [ɦ], while Ngulube (2011a) & Ngulube (2011b) only uses [h].) ⟨h⟩
Fricative	voiced	v	z					h ~ ɦ ⟨h⟩
Approximant			l	j ⟨y⟩		w		
Trill			r					

The phonetic value of orthographic ⟨gh⟩ in Ibani is unclear. Ngulube (2011a) places the symbol for the voiced velar fricative ⟨ɣ⟩ (typically what ⟨gh⟩ would signify) in the glottal plosive cell of the consonant chart, but in the phonetic values table below it writes only [ɡh]. This is presumably the same sound, but is not explicitly stated; neither the place nor manner of articulation are obvious given this oddity. Harry (2003) shows neither a glottal plosive nor a velar fricative in the JIPA publication.

Vowels
	Front	Back
Close	i	u
Near-close	ɪ ⟨ị⟩	ʊ ⟨ụ⟩
Close-mid	e	o
Open-mid	ɛ ⟨ẹ⟩	ɔ ⟨ọ⟩
Open	a	

== Writing system ==
Ibani alphabet
a	b	ḅ	d	e	ẹ	f	g	gb	gh	gw	h	i	ị	j	k	kp	kw	l	m	n	nw	ny	o	ọ	p	r	s	t	u	ụ	v	w	y	z

Kirike alphabet
a	b	ḅ	ch	d	ḍ	e	ẹ	f	g	gb	gw	h	i	ị	j	k	kp	kw	l	m	n	ñ	nw	ny	o	ọ	p	r	s	t	u	ụ	v	w	y	z

== See also ==
- Defaka word list (Wiktionary.)
