= Nkoroo people =

Nigerian ethnic group

The Nkoroo people are an Ijaw people living in Nkoroo, Rivers State, Nigeria, numbering about 4,700 (1989). The Nkoroo live in a close relationship with the Defaka, with both groups living in the same town (Nkoro town). They speak their own language, called Nkoroo. The Nkoroo people refer to themselves and their language as 'Kirika', though 'Nkoroo' (or Nkọrọọ) is the standard name used by outsiders and in the scholarly literature.
