= Southeast Ijo =

Ijaw language of Nigeria

- Akassa
- Native to: Nigeria
- Region: Bayelsa State
- Native speakers: (72,000 cited 1977)
- Language family: Niger–Congo?: Ijoid; Ịjọ; East; Southeast Ijo
- Dialects: Nembe; Akassa

Language codes
- ISO 639-3: ijs
- Glottolog: sout2774
- ELP: Southeast Ijo

Southeast Ijo is an Ijaw language spoken in southern Nigeria. There are two dialects, Nembe (Nimbe) and Akassa (Akaha).
