= Defaka language =

Endangered language of Nigeria

Defaka
- Afakani
- Défàkà
- Native to: Nigeria
- Region: Rivers State, Opobo–Nkoro
- Ethnicity: Defaka
- Native speakers: (200 cited 2001)
- Language family: Niger–Congo?: Ijoid?; Defaka

Language codes
- ISO 639-3: afn
- Glottolog: defa1248
- ELP: Defaka

Defaka is an endangered and divergent Nigerian language of uncertain classification. It is spoken in the Opobo–Nkoro LGA of Rivers State, in the Defaka or Afakani ward of Nkọrọ town and Ịwọma Nkọrọ. The low number of Defaka speakers, coupled with the fact that other languages dominate the region where Defaka is spoken, edges the language near extinction on a year-to-year basis. It is generally classified in an Ijoid branch of the Niger–Congo family. However, the Ijoid proposal is problematic. Blench (2012) notes that "Defaka has numerous external cognates and might be an isolate or independent branch of Niger–Congo which has come under Ịjọ influence."

== People ==
Ethnically, the Defaka people are distinct from the Nkoroo, but they have assimilated to Nkoroo culture to such a degree that their language seems to be the only sign of a distinct Defaka identity. Use of the Defaka language however is quickly receding in favour of the language of the Nkoroo, an Ijaw language. Nowadays, most Defaka speakers are elderly people, and even among these, Defaka is rarely spoken — the total number of Defaka speakers is at most 200 (SIL/Ethnologue 15th ed.). The decrease in use of Defaka is stronger in Nkoroo town than in the Iwoma area. Since the language communities between Defaka and Nkoroo are so intertwined, it is hard to determine which language influences the other.

All children grow up speaking Nkoroo (an Ijo language) as a first language. The next most used language among the Defaka is Igbo, owing to the political influence of the Opobo since the days of the Oil Rivers Trade. Igbo has been a language of instruction in many schools in the region and still functions as a regional trade language.

== Classification ==
The Defaka language shows many lexical similarities with Ijọ, some shared regular sound correspondences and some typological similarities with proto-Ịjọ. For example, both languages have a subject–object–verb basic word order, which is otherwise extremely rare in the Niger–Congo language family, being found only in the Mande and Dogon branches.

a ebere ko̘ a okuna ɓááma
the dog SUBJ the fowl kill:PST
The dog killed the fowl (Defaka)

obiri ɓé o̘ɓó̘kō̘ ɓé ɓám̄
dog the fowl the kill:PST
The dog killed the fowl (Ịjọ, Kalaɓarị dialect)

Also, Defaka has a sex-gender system distinguishing between masculine, feminine, and neuter 3rd-person singular pronouns; this is once again a rarity among south-central Niger–Congo languages other than Ịjoid and Defaka.

- á tóɓo 'her head'
- o toɓo 'his head'
- yé tóɓo 'its head'

While some of the lexical and maybe typological similarities can be attributed to borrowing (as Defaka has been in close contact with Ijọ for more than 300 years), the sound correspondences point to a (somewhat distant) genealogical relationship.

== Phonology ==
Nearly all Defaka are bilingual in Nkọrọọ, and the phonology appears to be the same as that language.

=== Tone ===
Defaka has two tones, high and low. On long vowels and diphthongs, as well as disyllabic words, high–low and low–high contours occur. In addition, there is a downstep that may appear between high tones, and which is the remnant of an elided low tone. However, Shryock et al. were not able to measure significant differences in the pitch traces of high–low, low–low, and high–downstep–high, all of which have a falling pitch, suggesting that there may be fewer distinctive word tones than the combinations of syllable tones would suggest. However, these all clearly contrast with level-pitched high–high and rising-pitched low–high.

=== Vowels ===
The Ijoid vowel harmony has collapsed in Defaka, as it has in Nkọrọọ. There are seven oral vowels, /i ɪ e a ɔ o u/, though /e/ and /ɔ/ are uncommon. There are five nasal vowels, /ĩ ẽ ã õ ũ/. All may occur long, and the nasal vowels are inherently long. Long vowels are at least twice as long as short vowels, except ⟨u⟩ and ⟨uu⟩.

=== Consonants ===
Consonants
		Labial	Alveolar	Palatal	Velar	Labial- velar
Nasal		m	(n) (Note: Allophone of /l/)		(ŋ) (Note: Allophone of /m/ next to velar and labial-velar stops)	
Implosive		ɓ				
Plosive	voiceless	p	t		k	kp
Plosive	voiced	b	d		g	gb
Affricate				dʒ		
Fricative	voiceless	f	s			
Fricative	voiced	v	(z) (Note: Allophone of /dʒ/)			
Tap			ɾ			
Lateral			l			
Approximant			(ɹ) (Note: Allophone of /ɾ/)	j		w

Most voiceless obstruents are tenuis. However, /kp/ has a slightly negative voice onset time. That is, voicing commences somewhat before the consonant is released, as in English "voiced" stops such as ⟨b⟩. This is typical of labial-velar stops. /ɡb/, on the other hand, is fully voiced, as are the other voiced obstruents. Shryock et al. analyse the prenasalised stops [mb nd ŋɡ ŋɡ͡b] as consonant clusters with /m/. [dʒ] varies with [z], with some speakers using one, some the other, and some either, depending on the word.

/j/ and /w/ may be nasalised before nasal vowels.

The velar plosives /k/ and /ɡ/ may be lenited to [x] or [ɣ] between vowels.

The tap /ɾ/ is pronounced as an approximant, [ɹ], by some speakers. It only occurs between vowels and at the ends of words.

== See also ==
- Defaka word list (Wiktionary)
