= Nkoroo =

Town in Rivers State, Nigeria

Coordinates: 4.544°N 7.464°E

Nkoroo is a town in the Bonny territory of Rivers State, Nigeria. It is the home of the Nkoroo people and the Nkoroo language.
