= Okodia language =

Ijaw language spoken in Nigeria

Okodia
- Akita
- Native to: Nigeria
- Region: Rivers State
- Ethnicity: Buseni
- Native speakers: (3,600 cited 1977)
- Language family: Niger–Congo?: Ijoid; Ijaw; West; Inland; Okodia

Language codes
- ISO 639-3: okd
- Glottolog: okod1238
- ELP: Okodia

Okodia (Okordia), or Akita, is one of three small Inland Ijaw languages of Nigeria. According to Ethnologue, it is not fully intelligible with other varieties of Inland Ijaw.
