= Nkoroo language =

Ijaw language of Nigeria

Nkoroo
- Native to: Nigeria
- Region: Rivers State, Opobo-Nkoro LGA
- Ethnicity: Nkoroo people
- Native speakers: (4,600 cited 1989)
- Language family: Niger–Congo?: Ijoid; Ịjọ; East; Nkoroo

Language codes
- ISO 639-3: nkx
- Glottolog: nkor1239
- ELP: Nkoroo

Nkọrọọ is an Ijaw language spoken by about 4,500 ethnic Nkọrọọ in Rivers State, Nigeria.

Nkọrọọ has significantly influenced the Defaka language.
