= Toguna =

Public building erected by Dogon people in Mali

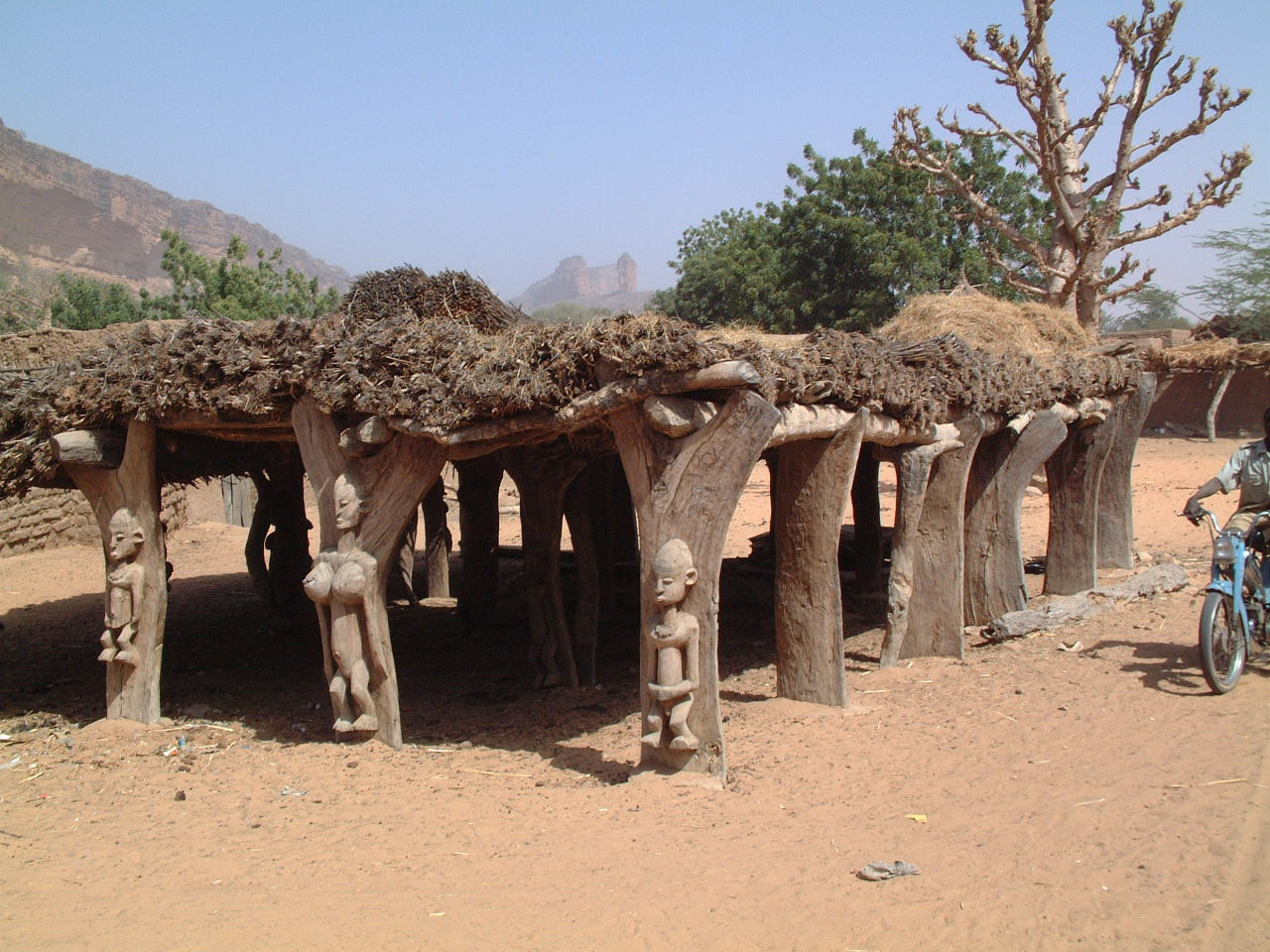
A toguna in the Malian village of Endé

A toguna (or palaver hut), also written as togu'na or togu na (meaning "great shelter"), is a public building erected by the Dogon people in the West African country of Mali. Togunas are usually located in the center of the village.

Togunas are built with a very low roof, with the express purpose of forcing visitors to sit rather than stand. This helps with avoiding violence when discussions get heated. They are used by the village elders to discuss problems of the community, but can also serve as a place for customary law.

In practice, the toguna is used as a general gathering spot in the center of the village, offering shade and relief from the midday heat, where the village elders spend the hottest hours of the day talking with each other.

Toguna are celebrated artworks and artifacts in galleries, museums, and private collections across the world with their relief carvings of men or women with exaggerated genitalia to represent fertility and the Dogon society's future.
