= Ijaw languages =

Language family

Ijaw
- Izon
- Geographic distribution: Southern Nigeria, Niger Delta
- Ethnicity: Ijaw people
- Linguistic classification: Niger–Congo?: Ijoid?; Ijaw
- Subdivisions: East; Central; West

Language codes
- ISO 639-2 / 5: ijo
- Glottolog: ijoo1239

The Ijaw languages (/ˈiːdʒɔː/), also spelled Ịjọ, are the languages spoken by over 14 million Ijaw people in Nigeria.

== Classification ==
The Ijo languages were traditionally considered a distinct branch of the Niger–Congo family (perhaps along with Defaka in a group called Ijoid). They are notable for their subject–object–verb basic word order, which is otherwise an unusual feature in Niger–Congo, shared only by such distant potential branches as Mande and Dogon. Like Mande and Dogon, Ijoid lacks even traces of the noun class system considered characteristic of Niger–Congo. This motivated Joseph Greenberg, in his initial classification of Niger–Congo, to describe them as having split early from that family. However, owing to the lack of these features, linguist Gerrit Dimmendaal doubts their inclusion in Niger–Congo altogether and considers the Ijoid languages to be an independent family.

The ijoid languages can be classified into three main linguistic groups, Eastern Ijo, Western Ijo and Central Ijo, with the Central Izon (Ijaw) language being the most common.

- Ijoid
  - Eastern Ijo
    - Nkoroo
    - Kalabari (Kalabari)
    - Bille (Touma, Krikama, Jikeama)
    - Ibani, Obolo, Wakirike
    - Southeast Ijo/Central Ijo
      - Nembe
      - Akassa
  - Central Ijo/Inland Ijo
    - Central Izon
      - Furupaga, Finima, Engeni, Arogbo, Burutu, Patani, Oboro etc
    - Biseni
      - Akinima, Engeni, Egbema, Mbiama
    - Akita (Okordia)
    - Ogbia (Ogbia, Anyama, Abureni)
    - Abua/Odual, Apoi, Arogbo etc
    - Oruma
  - Western Ijo
    - Furupagha, Apoi, Olodiama, Arogbo etc

== Names and locations ==
Below is a list of some Ijaw language names, groups, and locations.

| Language | Group | Alternate Names | Speakers | Location |
|---|---|---|---|---|
| Oruma | Central Ijo | Kąąma, Tugbaru | | Bayelsa State |
| Nembe | Central Ijo | Nimbi, Akaha | Brass, Akassa, Nembe | Bayelsa State |
| Kalabari | Eastern Ijo | | Degema, Abonema, Kula, Ke, Asari-Toru, Akuku-Toru, Bille, Krakrama etc | Rivers State |
| Ogbia | Central Ijo | | Kolo, Anyama, Immiringi, Emakalakala/Amakalakala, Ogbia, Ewoma, etc | Bayelsa State |
| Bille | Eastern Ijo | | Degema, Bille | Rivers State |
| Wakiriki | Eastern Ijo | Kirike | Okirika, Ogu-Bolo | Rivers State |
| Okodia | Central Ijo, Western Ijo | Akita | Buseni, Yenagoa, Operemo, Opukuma etc | Bayelsa State, Edo State |
| Epie/Atissa | Central Ijo | | Yenagoa, Ekpetiama, Akenfa, Gbaran, Agudama, Epie, Atissa etc | Bayelsa State |
| Biseni | Central Ijo | Buseni | Biseni, Mbiama, Akinima, Engeni, Egbema etc | Bayelsa State, Rivers State |
| Central Izon (Ijaw) | Central Ijo, Western Ijo | Ijaw, Izon, Ijo | Burutu, Sagbama, Bomadi, Warri, Oporoza, Tuomo, Kolokuma, Patani, Southern Ijaw, Ekeremor, Focardos, Ndoro, Opokuma, Egbema, Zide, Kabo, Age, Toru-Orua, Ogobiri, Amassoma, Aleibiri, Torugbene, Angiama, Ayamasa, Igbematoru, Azuzuama, Anyama Ijaw, Okumo/Ukomo, Tarakiri, Furupagha, Boma (Bumo), Oporoma, Olodiama, Pakiama, Oboro, Isama, Akugbene, Okologba etc | Bayelsa State, Delta State |
| Apoi | Central Ijo, Western Ijo | | Oboro, Oju-ala, Apoi, Adolesemo, Ese-Odo, Inikorogha, Taribo etc | Bayelsa State, Ondo State, Delta State |
| Abua/Odual | Central Ijo | | Abua, Odual | Rivers State |
| Arogbo | Central Ijo, Western Ijo | | Finiama, Akpata, Opuba, Ukpe, Ajapa, Arogbo etc | Bayelsa State, Ondo State |
| Abureni | Central Ijo | | Abureni, Ogbia | Bayelsa State |
| Ibani | Eastern Ijo | | Opobo, Bonny, Finima, Nkoro, Borokiri, Oloma, Abalama, Peretside etc | Rivers State |
| Obolo | Eastern Ijo | Andoni | Akaradi, Andoni, Anyama-aganna, Ibeno, Eastern Obolo, Anyamabeko etc | Rivers State, AkwaIbom State |

== In the diaspora ==
Berbice Creole Dutch, an extinct creole spoken in Guyana, had a lexicon based partly on an Ịjọ language, perhaps the ancestor of Kalabari.

== Education and media ==
In June 2013, the Izon Fie instructional book and audio CDs were launched at a ceremony attended by officials of the government of Bayelsa State. The Niger Delta University is working to expand the range of books available in the Ijo language. Translations of poetry and the Call of the River Nun by Gabriel Okara are underway.

== See also ==
- List of Proto-Ijaw reconstructions (Wiktionary)

== Bibliography ==
- Freemann, R. A., and Kay Williamson. 1967. Ịjọ proverbs. Research Notes (Ibadan) 1:1-11.
- Kouwenberg, Silvia 1994. A grammar of Berbice Dutch Creole. (Mouton Grammar Library 12). Berlin/New York: Mouton de Gruyter.
- Lee, J. D., and Kay Williamson. 1990. A lexicostatistic classification of Ịjọ dialects. Research in African Languages and Linguistics 1:1.1-10.
- Williamson, Kay. 1963. The syntax of verbs of motion in Ịjọ. J. African Languages 2.150-154.
- Williamson, Kay. 1966. Ịjọ dialects in the Polyglotta Africana. Sierra Leone Language Review 5. 122-133.
- Williamson, Kay. 1969. 'Igbo' and 'Ịjọ', chapters 7 and 8 in: Twelve Nigerian Languages, ed. by E. Dunstan. Longmans.
- Williamson, Kay. 1971. Animal names in Ịjọ. Afr. Notes 6, no. 2, 53-61.
- Williamson, Kay. 1973. Some reduced vowel harmony systems. Research Notes 6:1-3. 145-169.
- Williamson, Kay. 1977. Multivalued features for consonants. Language 53.843-871.
- Williamson, Kay. 1978. From tone to pitch-accent: the case of Ịjọ. Kiabàrà 1:2.116-125.
- Williamson, Kay. 1979. Consonant distribution in Ịjọ. In: Linguistic and literary studies presented to Archibald Hill, ed. E.C. Polome and W. Winter, 3.341-353. Lisse, Netherlands: Peter de Ridder Press.
- Williamson, Kay. 1979. Medial consonants in Proto-Ịjọ. Journal of African Languages and Linguistics 1.73-94.
- Williamson, Kay. 1987. Nasality in Ịjọ. In: Current trends in African linguistics, 4, ed. by David Odden, 397-415.
- Williamson, Kay. 1989. Tone and accent in Ịjọ. In Pitch accent systems, ed. by Harry v.d. Hulst and Norval Smith, 253-278. Foris Publications.
- Williamson, Kay. 2004. The language situation in the Niger Delta. Chapter 2 in: The development of Ịzọn language, edited by Martha L. Akpana, 9-13.
- Williamson, Kay, and A. O. Timitimi. 1970. A note on number symbolism in Ịjọ. African Notes (Ibadan) 5:3. 9-16.
- Williamson, Kay & Timitime, A.O. (197?) 'A note on Ijo number symbolism', African Notes, 5, 3, 9-16.
- Filatei, Akpodigha. 2006. The Ijaw Language Project. (Editor of www.ijawdictionary.com). www.ijawdictionary.com

=== On specific languages ===
- Williamson, Kay. 1962. (Republished by Bobbs-Merrill Reprints 1971.). Changes in the marriage system of the Okrika Ịjọ. Africa 32.53-60.
- Orupabo, G. J., and Kay Williamson. 1980. Okrika. In West African language data sheets, Volume II, edited by M.E. Kropp Dakubu. Leiden: West African Linguistic Society and African Studies Centre.
