= Ijoid languages =

Proposed language family of southern Nigeria

Ijoid
- Geographic distribution: Southern Nigeria
- Linguistic classification: Niger–Congo?
- Subdivisions: Ijaw; ?Defaka

Language codes
- Glottolog: ijoi1239

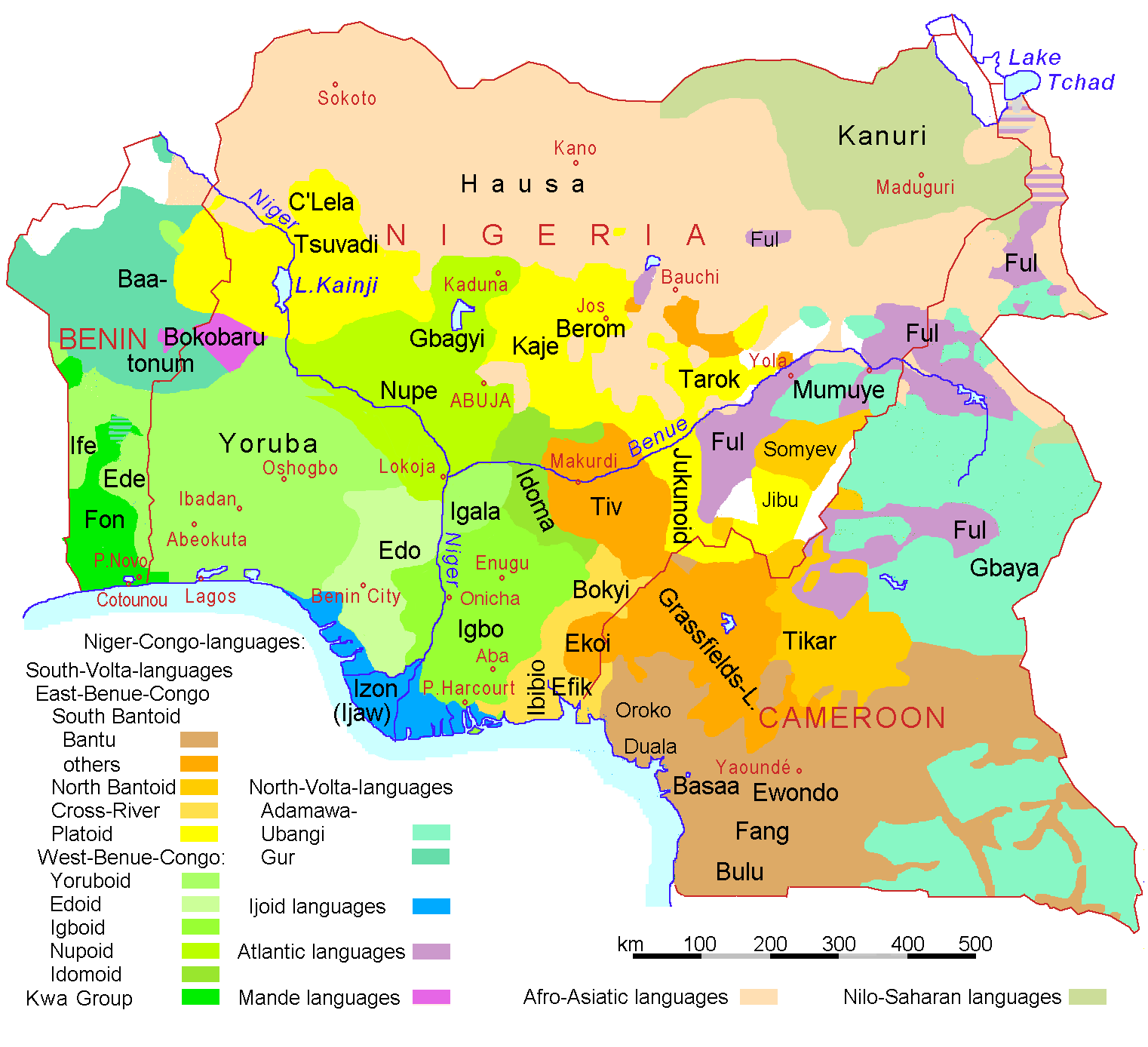
Map of languages of Nigeria, Cameroon, and Benin

Ijoid is a proposed but undemonstrated group of languages in Nigeria linking the Ijaw languages (Ịjọ) with the endangered Defaka language. The similarities, however, may be due to Ijaw influence on Defaka.

The Ijoid languages, or perhaps just Ijaw, are proposed to form a divergent branch of the hypothetical Niger–Congo family and are noted for their subject–object–verb basic word order, which is otherwise an unusual feature in Niger–Congo, shared only by such distant branches as Mande and Dogon. Like Mande and Dogon, Ijoid lacks even traces of the noun class system considered characteristic of Niger–Congo, and so might have split early from that family. Linguists Gerrit Dimmendaal and Tom Güldemann doubt its inclusion in Niger–Congo altogether and consider the Ijaw/Ijoid languages to be an independent family.

== Comparative vocabulary ==
Sample basic vocabulary for Proto-Ijaw, Kalabari, and Defaka:

Language	eye	ear	nose	tooth	tongue	mouth	blood	bone	tree	water	eat	name
Proto-Ijaw	*tɔrɪ³	*ɓeri¹	*nḭnḭ³	*aka²	*ɪ̰ɓɛ̰lɛʊ²	*ɓɪpɪ²	*asɪ̰ɪ̰¹	*ṵgbəu²	*tɛ̰ɪ̰²	*ɓed̰i¹	*fɪɪ²	*ɪrɛ²
Kalabari	tɔ́rʊ̄	ɓeri	nínī	áká	ɓɛ́lɛ́	ɓɪ́ɓɪ́	ímgbe	ɔmbɪ-yé, pulo	sɪ́n	minji	fɪ́	ɛ́rɛ́
Defaka	ɔ́yɔ	ɓasi	níni	nɪan	mɛndʊɔ	ɓɪ́ɪ́	ḿbua	asi	ibo tiin	mbɪ́á	éé	ɪ́tá

=== Numerals ===
Comparison of numerals in individual languages:

Classification	Language	1	2	3	4	5	6	7	8	9	10
Defaka	Defaka	ɡbérí	mààmà	táátó	nɛ́ì	túúnɔ̀	màànɡò	túààmà (5 + 2?)	túàtùà (5 + 3?)	túùnèì (5 + 4?)	wóì
Ijo, East, Northeastern	Nkoroo	ɡbɔ́rí	màmì	tárú	nɛ̃́ĩ́	sɔ́nɔ́	sóníá	sɔ́nɔ́mà	nínì (4+4?)	ísíéní	ójí
Ijo, East, Northeastern, Eastern	Ibani	ŋ̀ɡɪ̀ɛ́	m̀mɛ̀ɛ́	tɛ́rɛ́	íní	sɔ́nɔ́	sóníɛ́	sɔ́nɔ́mà	ínínè	éséníé	àtìé / ójí
Ijo, East, Northeastern, Eastern	Okrika (Kalabari)	ŋ̀ɡèi	màɪ̃	tɛrɛ	ineĩ	sɔnɔ	sonio	sɔnɔmɛ̀	ninè	esenie	oji, àtèi
Ijo, West Ijo	Izon (Ijaw/Ijo) (1)	kẹnị́	mamụ́	tǎrụ	nóín	sọ́nrọ́n =sɔ̃́rɔ̃́ ?	sǒndie	sọ́nọ́ma	nínɡíni	isé	óí
Ijo, West Ijo	Izon (Ijaw/Ijo) (2)	kẹnị́	mamụ́	tǎrụ	nóín	sọ́nrọ́n =sɔ̃́rɔ̃́ ?	sǒndie	sọ́nọ́ma	nínɡíni	isé	óí
Ijo, West Ijo	Izon (Ijaw/Ijo) (3)	kẹnị́	maamụ́	tǎarụ	nóín	sọ́nrọ́n =sɔ̃́rɔ̃́ ?	sǒndie	sọ́nọ́ma	níníni or nínɡíni	isé	oyi/ óí
Ijo, West, Inland Ijo	Okordia	kɛ̀nɪ	maamʊ	taarʊ	nii	sɔ̃ɔ̃rɔ̃	sɔ̃zie / sɔ̃zɪ	sɔnɔmà	màà fùi	sioni, eji karama (10 - 1)	eji

== Bibliography ==
- Jenewari, Charles E. W. (1989) 'Ijoid'. In Bendor-Samuel, John and Hartell, Rhonda L. (eds.), The Niger–Congo languages: A classification and description of Africa's largest language family, 105-118. Lanham, MD: University Press of America.
- Williamson, Kay. 1969. 'Igbo' and 'Ịjọ', chapters 7 and 8 in: Twelve Nigerian Languages, ed. by E. Dunstan. Longmans.
- Williamson, Kay. 1971. The Benue–Congo languages and Ịjọ. In: Current Trends in Linguistics, Vol. 7, series ed. by T. A. Sebeok, 245-306.
- Williamson, Kay. 1988. Linguistic evidence for the prehistory of the Niger Delta. In: The Prehistory of the Niger Delta, ed. by E.J. Alagoa and others. Hamburg: Helmut Buske Verlag.
- Williamson, Kay. 1998. Defaka revisited. The multi-disciplinary approach to African history, edited by Nkparom C. Ejituwu, Chapter 9, 151-183. Port Harcourt: University of Port Harcourt Press.
- Williamson, Kay. 2004. The language situation in the Niger Delta. Chapter 2 in: The development of Ịzọn language, edited by Martha L. Akpana, 9-13.
- Williamson, Kay & Blench, Roger (2000) 'Niger–Congo', in Heine, Bernd and Nurse, Derek (eds) African Languages: An Introduction. Cambridge: Cambridge University press, pp. 11–42.
