= Mosque =

Place of worship for Muslims

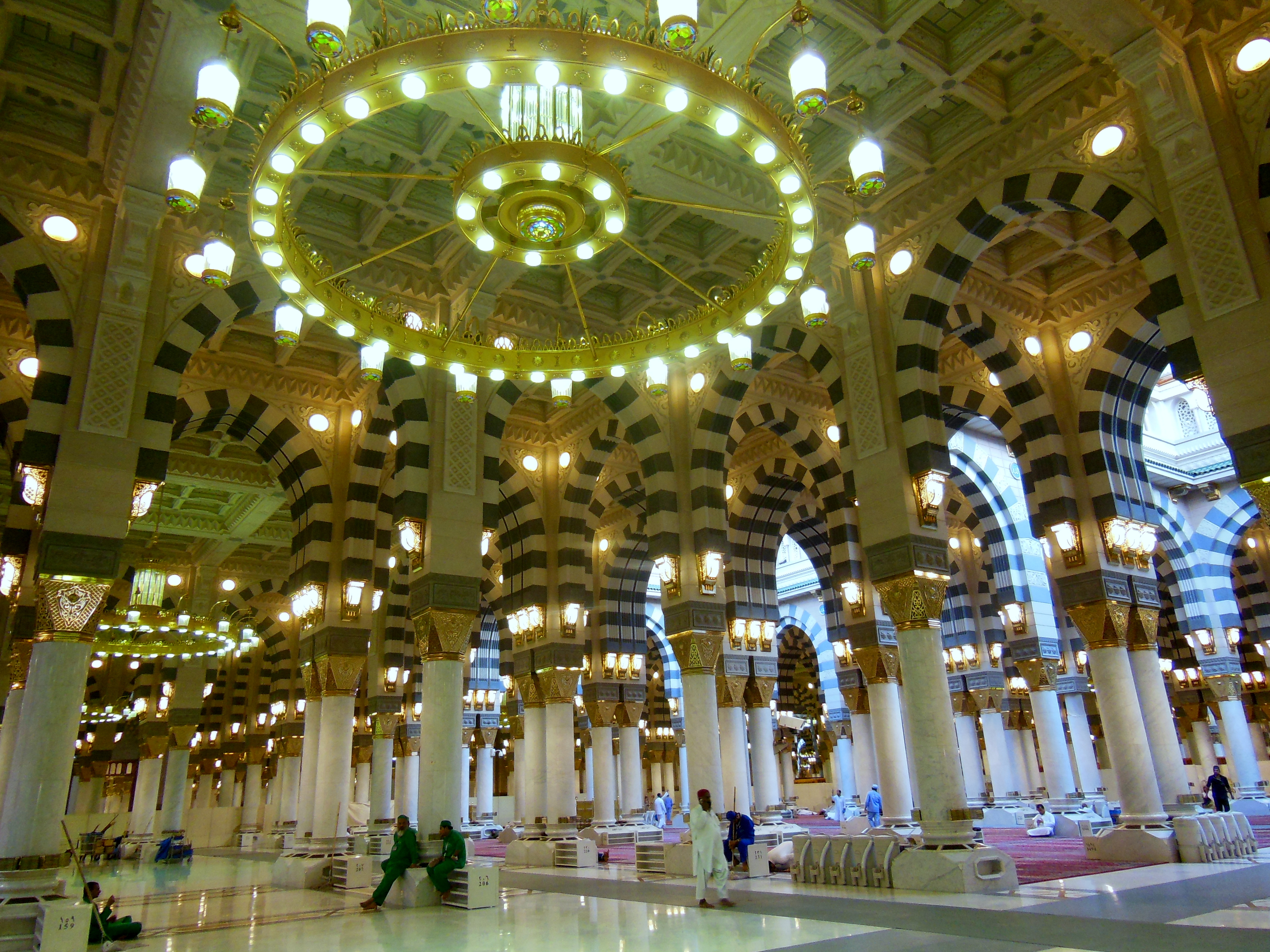
The Prophet's Mosque in Medina, the second holiest site in Islam

A mosque (/mɒsk/ MOSK), also called a masjid (/ˈmæsdʒɪd, ˈmʌs-/ MASS-jid, MUSS-), (Note: Arabic: مَسْجِد [ˈmasdʒid] (lit. 'place of ritual prostration')) is a place of worship for Muslims. The term usually refers to a covered building, but can be any place where Islamic prayers are performed, such as an outdoor courtyard.

Originally, mosques were simple places of prayer for the early Muslims, and may have been open spaces rather than elaborate buildings. In the first stage of Islamic architecture (650–750 CE), early mosques comprised open and closed covered spaces enclosed by walls, often with minarets, from which the Islamic call to prayer was issued on a daily basis. It is typical of mosque buildings to have a special ornamental niche (a mihrab) set into the wall in the direction of the city of Mecca (the qibla), which Muslims must face during prayer, as well as a facility for ritual cleansing (wudu). The pulpit (minbar), from which public sermons (khutbah) are delivered on the event of Friday prayer, was, in earlier times, characteristic of the central city mosque, but has since become common in smaller mosques. To varying degrees, mosque buildings are designed so that there are segregated spaces for men and women. This basic pattern of organization has assumed different forms depending on the region, period, and Islamic denomination.

In addition to being places of worship in Islam, mosques also serve as locations for funeral services and funeral prayers, marriages (nikah), vigils during Ramadan, disputes, collection and distribution of alms, and homeless shelters. To this end, mosques have historically been multi-purpose buildings functioning as community centres, courts of law, and religious schools. In modern times, they have also preserved their role as places of religious instruction and debate. Special importance is accorded to, in descending order of importance: al-Masjid al-Haram in the city of Mecca, where Hajj and Umrah are performed; the Prophet's Mosque in the city of Medina, where Muhammad is buried; and al-Aqsa Mosque in the city of Jerusalem, where Muslims believe that Muhammad ascended to heaven to meet God around 621 CE.

During and after the early Muslim conquests, mosques were established outside of Arabia in the hundreds; many synagogues, churches, and temples were converted into mosques and thus influenced Islamic architectural styles over the centuries. While most pre-modern mosques were funded by charitable endowments (waqf), the modern-day trend of government regulation of large mosques has been countered by the rise of privately funded mosques, many of which serve as bases for different streams of Islamic revivalism and social activism.

== Etymology ==
The word mosque entered the English language from the French mosquée, probably derived from Italian moschea (a variant of Italian moscheta), from either Middle Armenian մզկիթ (mzkit), Medieval Greek: μασγίδιον (masgídion), or Spanish mezquita, from Arabic: مسجد, romanized: masjid ("site of prostration in prayer" and hence a place of worship), either from Nabataean masg^{ĕ}dhā́ or from Arabic: سَجَدَ, romanized: sajada (meaning "to prostrate"), probably ultimately from Nabataean Arabic masg^{ĕ}dhā́ or Aramaic s^{ĕ}ghēdh.

== History ==
=== Origins ===
Islam was established in Arabia during the lifetime of Muhammad in the 7th century CE. The first mosque in history could be either the sanctuary built around the Ka'bah in Mecca, known today as Al-Masjid al-Haram ('The Sacred Mosque'), or the Quba Mosque in Medina, the first structure built by Muhammad upon his emigration from Mecca in 622 CE, both located in the Hejaz region in present-day Saudi Arabia.

Other scholars reference Islamic tradition and passages of the Quran, according to which Islam as a religion precedes Muhammad, and includes previous prophets such as Abraham. In Islamic tradition, Abraham is credited with having built the Ka'bah in Mecca, and consequently its sanctuary, Al-Masjid al-Haram, which is seen by Muslims as the first mosque that existed. A hadith in Sahih al-Bukhari states that the sanctuary of the Ka'bah was the first mosque on Earth, with the second mosque being Al-Aqsa in Jerusalem, which is also associated with Abraham. Since as early as 638 CE, the Sacred Mosque of Mecca has been expanded on several occasions to accommodate the increasing number of Muslims who either live in the area or make the annual pilgrimage known as Hajj to the city.

Either way, after the Quba Mosque, Muhammad went on to establish another mosque in Medina, which is now known as Al-Masjid an-Nabawi ('The Prophet's Mosque'). Built on the site of his home, Muhammad participated in the construction of the mosque himself and helped pioneer the concept of the mosque as the focal point of the Islamic city. The Prophet's Mosque is considered by some scholars of Islamic architecture to be the first mosque. The mosque had a roof supported by columns made of palm tree trunks and it included a large courtyard, a motif common among mosques built since then. Rebuilt and expanded over time, it soon became a larger hypostyle structure. It probably served as a model for the construction of early mosques elsewhere. It introduced some of the features still common in today's mosques, including the niche at the front of the prayer space known as the mihrab (first added in the Umayyad period) and the tiered pulpit called the minbar.

The three holiest sites in Islam

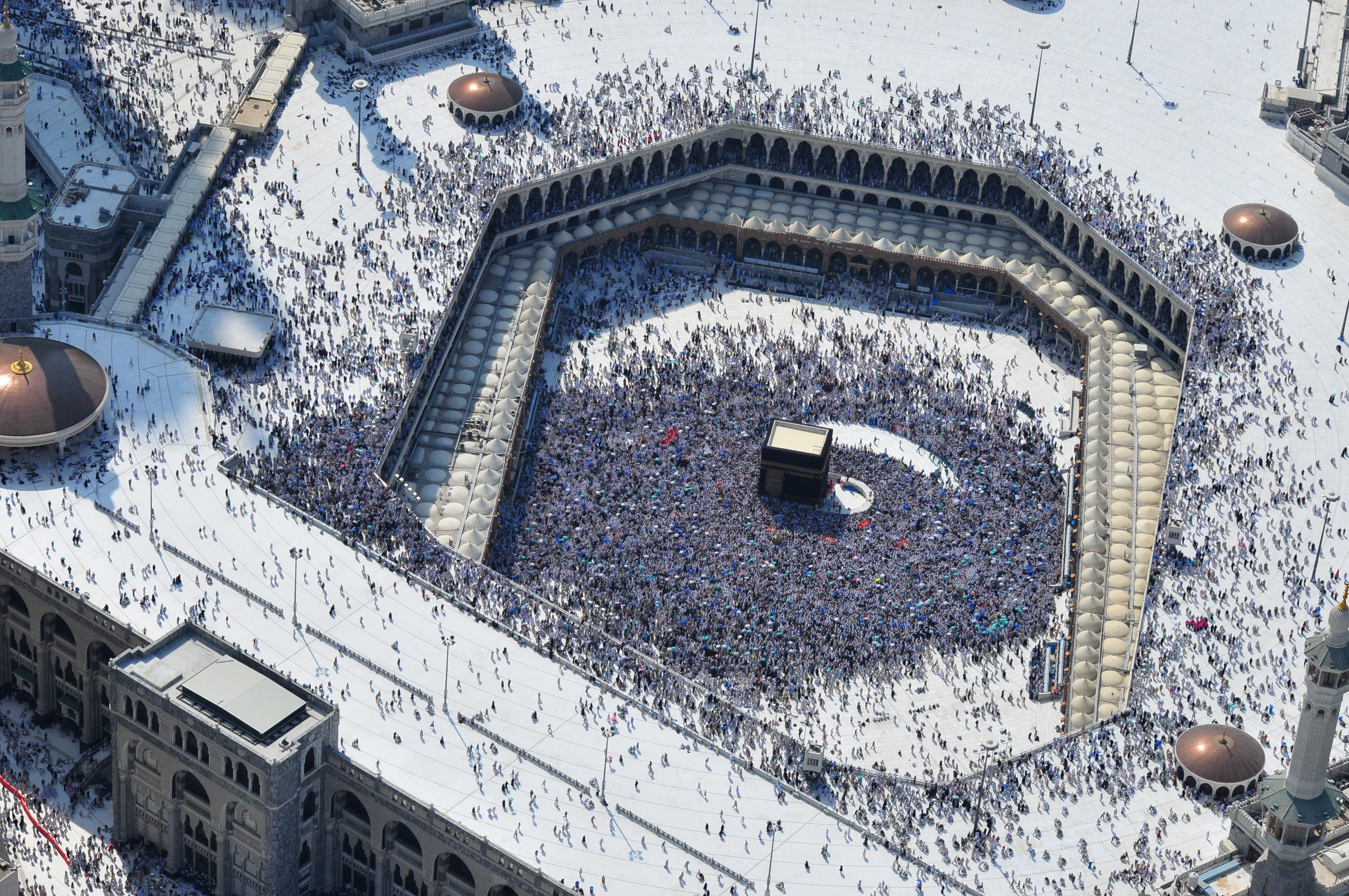
Aerial view of the largest mosque in the world, The Sacred Mosque (Al-Masjid Al-Ḥarām) of Mecca in the Hejaz region of Saudi Arabia, with the Kaaba in the center

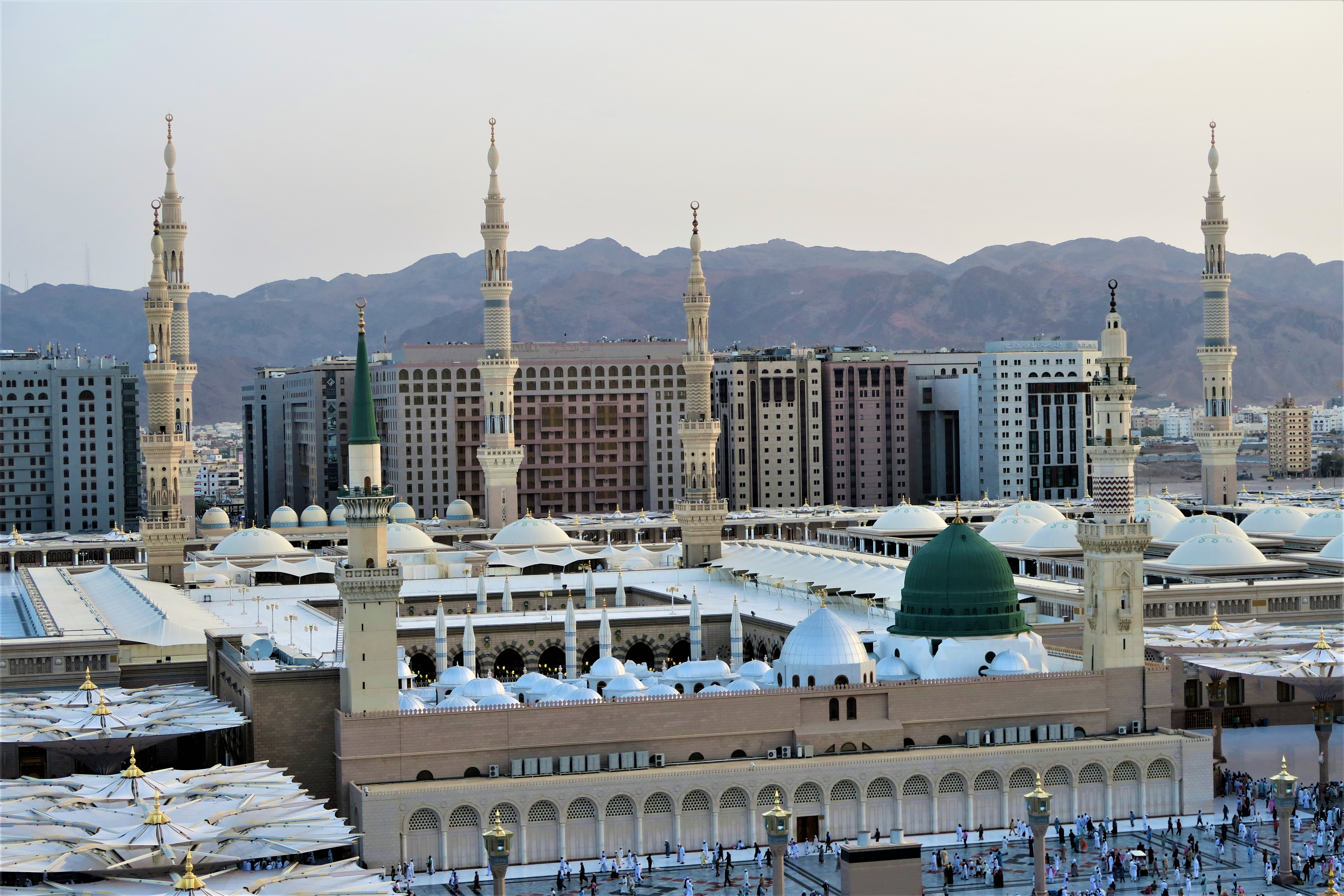
Islam's second holiest site Al-Masjid an-Nabawi (The Prophet's Mosque) in Medina

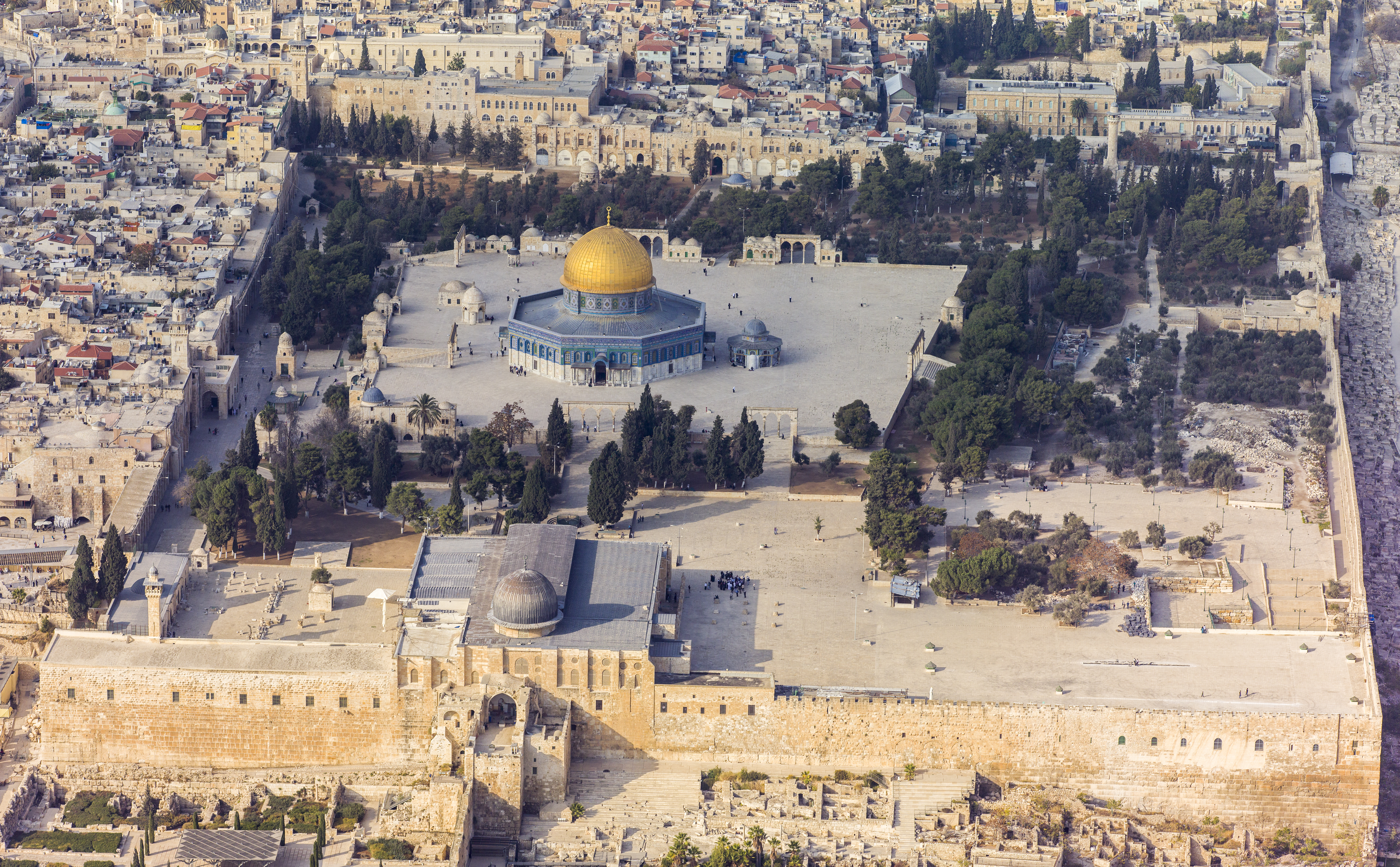
Islam's third holiest site, Al-Aqsa Mosque compound in Jerusalem, including the Dome of the Rock at the center and the Qibli Mosque (Al-Aqsa Mosque) to the south

=== Diffusion and evolution ===
The Umayyad Mosque in Damascus (715 CE) followed the plan of the Prophet's Mosque in Medina, and became the earliest example of a grand mosque that served as standard for future mosques

The Umayyad Caliphate was particularly instrumental in spreading Islam and establishing mosques within the Levant, as the Umayyads constructed among the most revered mosques in the region: the Qibli Mosque and Dome of the Rock both part of Al-Aqsa in Jerusalem, and the Umayyad Mosque in Damascus, and also built other important mosques in the region including the Great Mosques of Aleppo and Hama. They also renovated and expanded other mosques like the Prophet's Mosque in Medina (which saw the introduction of the first mihrab) the Masjid al-Haram in Mecca, the Great Mosque of Sanaa, and the mosques of Kufa, Basra and Amr ibn Al-As (in Cairo). The designs of the Dome of the Rock and the Umayyad Mosque were influenced by Byzantine architecture, a trend that was revived much later with the rise of the Ottoman Empire.

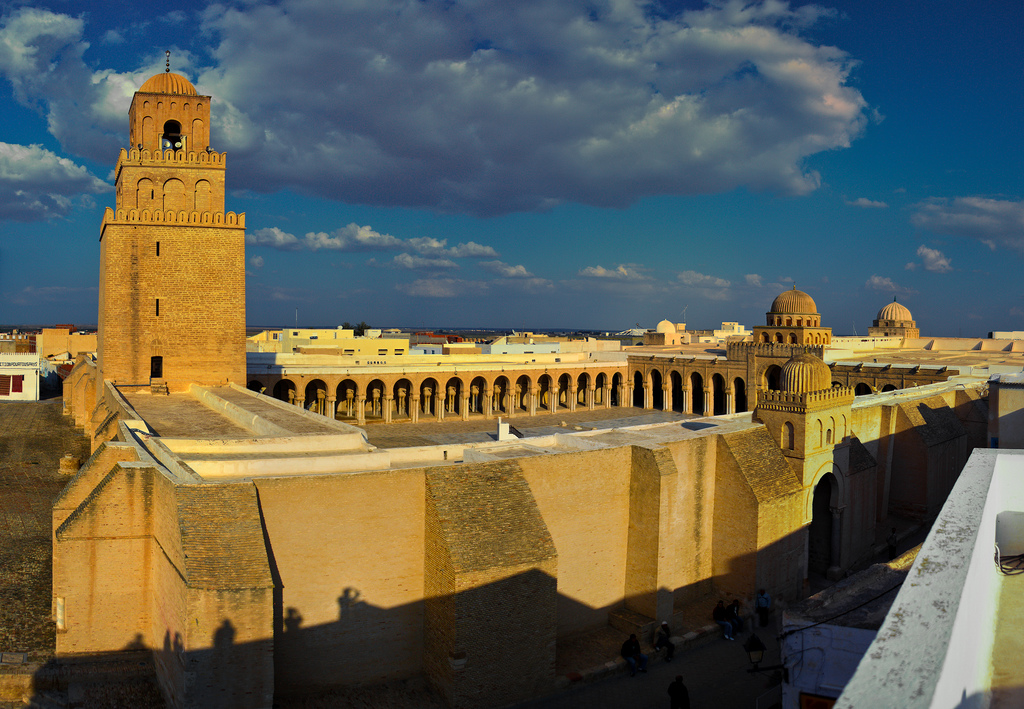
The Great Mosque of Kairouan (est. in 670, main current structure dates to 836), in Tunisia, with its minaret (left) being one of the oldest standing minarets in the world

The Great Mosque of Kairouan in present-day Tunisia was the first mosque built in the Maghreb (northwest Africa), with its present form (dating from the ninth century) serving as a model for other Islamic places of worship in the Maghreb. It was the first in the region to incorporate a square minaret, which was characteristic of later Maghrebi mosques, and includes naves akin to a basilica. Those features can also be found in Andalusi mosques, including the Great Mosque of Cordoba, as they tended to reflect the architecture of the Moors instead of their Visigoth predecessors. Still, some elements of Visigothic architecture, like horseshoe arches, were infused into the mosque architecture of Spain and the Maghreb.

Muslim empires were instrumental in the evolution and spread of mosques. Although mosques were first established in India during the seventh century, they were not commonplace across the subcontinent until the arrival of the Mughals in the 16th and 17th centuries. Reflecting their Timurid origins, Mughal-style mosques included onion domes, pointed arches, and elaborate circular minarets, features common in the Persian and Central Asian styles. The Jama Masjid in Delhi and the Badshahi Mosque in Lahore, built in a similar manner in the mid-17th century, remain two of the largest mosques on the Indian subcontinent.

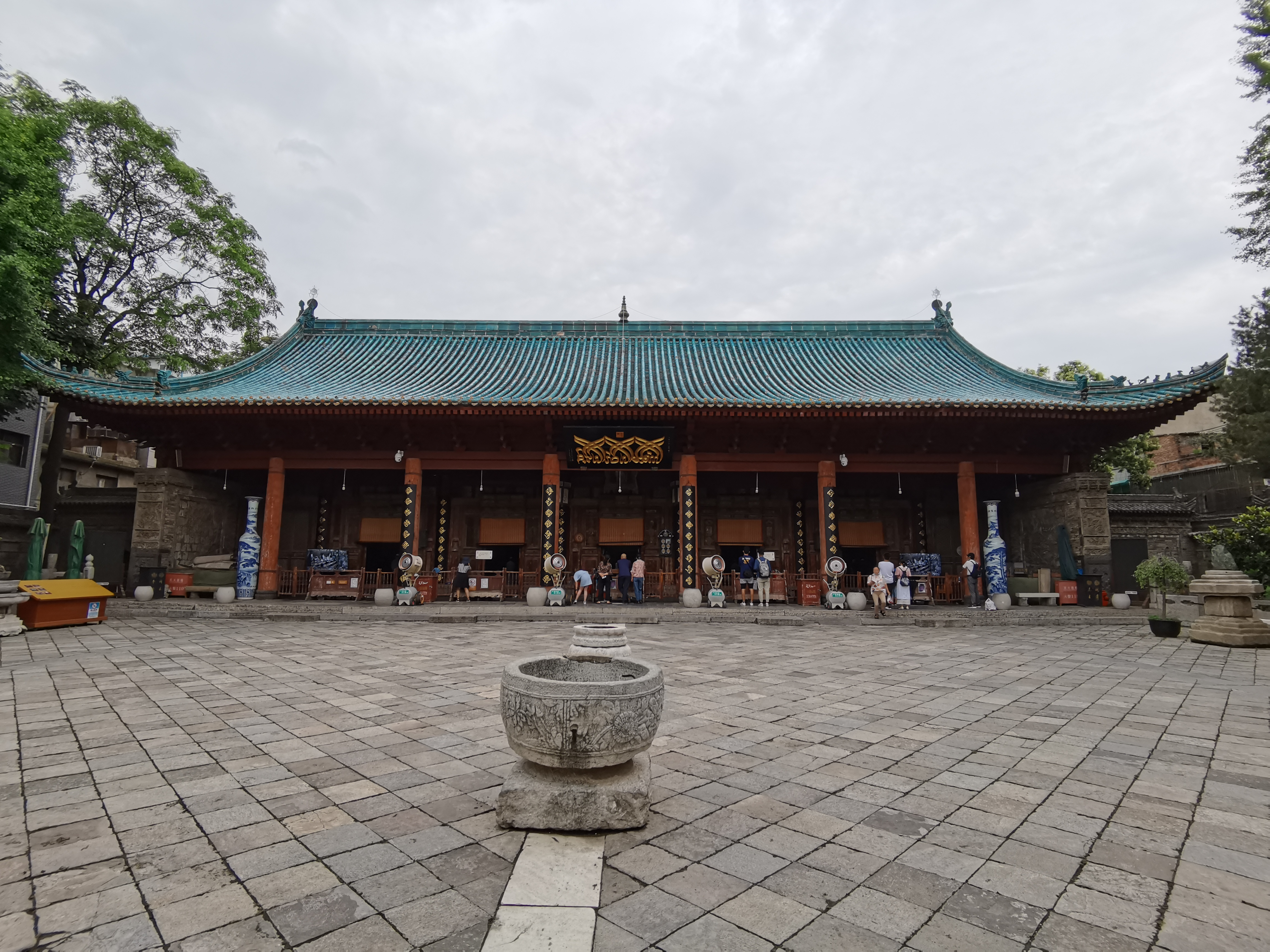
Great Mosque of Xi'an in China established in 742

One of first grand mosques in East Asia was established in the eighth century in Xi'an (at the time it was called Chang'an and it was the world's largest city). The Great Mosque of Xi'an, whose current building dates from the 18th century, does not replicate the features often associated with mosques elsewhere. Minarets were initially prohibited by the state. Following traditional Chinese architecture, the Great Mosque of Xi'an, like many other mosques in eastern China, resembles a pagoda, with a green roof instead of the yellow roof common on imperial structures in China. Mosques in western China were more likely to incorporate elements, like domes and minarets, traditionally seen in mosques elsewhere.

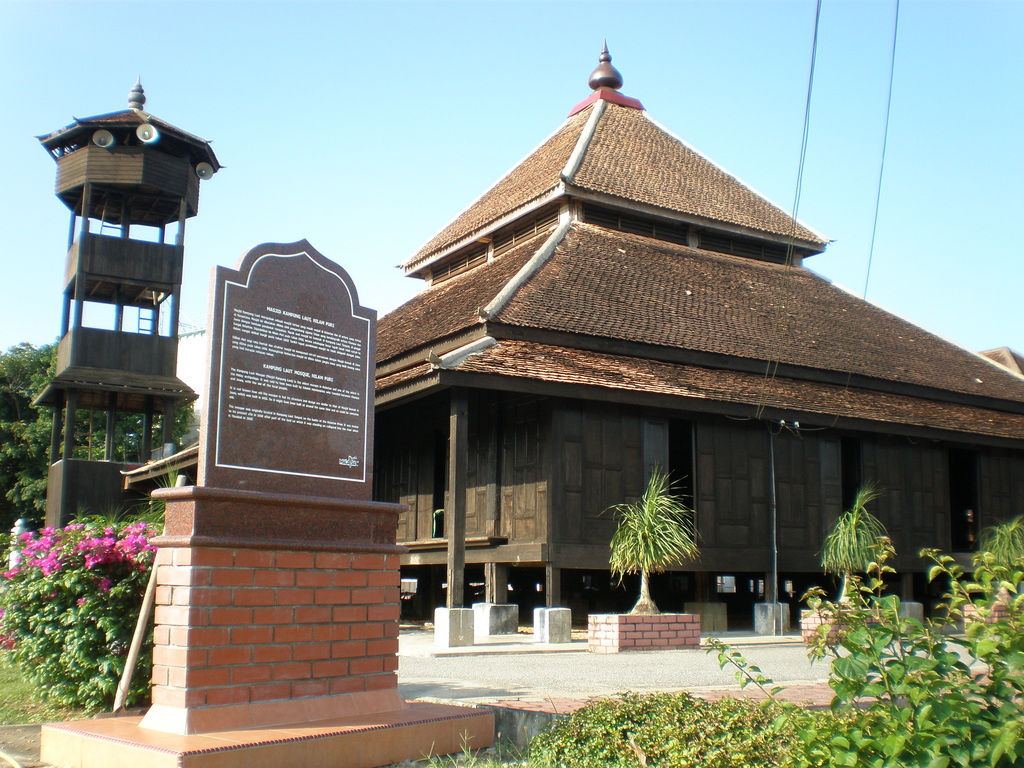
Kampung Laut Mosque, built in the 15th century, reflecting the southeast Asian local architecture.

A similar integration of foreign and local influences could be seen on the Indonesian islands of Sumatra and Java, where mosques, including the Ampel Mosque, were first established in the 15th century. Early Javanese mosques took design cues from Hindu, Buddhist, and Chinese architectural influences, with tall timber, multi-level roofs similar to the pagodas of Balinese Hindu temples; the ubiquitous Islamic dome did not appear in Indonesia until the 19th century. In turn, the Javanese style influenced the styles of mosques in Indonesia's Austronesian neighbors: Malaysia, Brunei, and the Philippines. The Kampung Laut Mosque is considered to be the oldest mosque in Malaysia, its design includes a three-tier pyramidal roofs, the mosque and its minaret are made of timber, while the floor of the whole mosque is raised one meter above ground, which is made for flood protection and natural cooling.

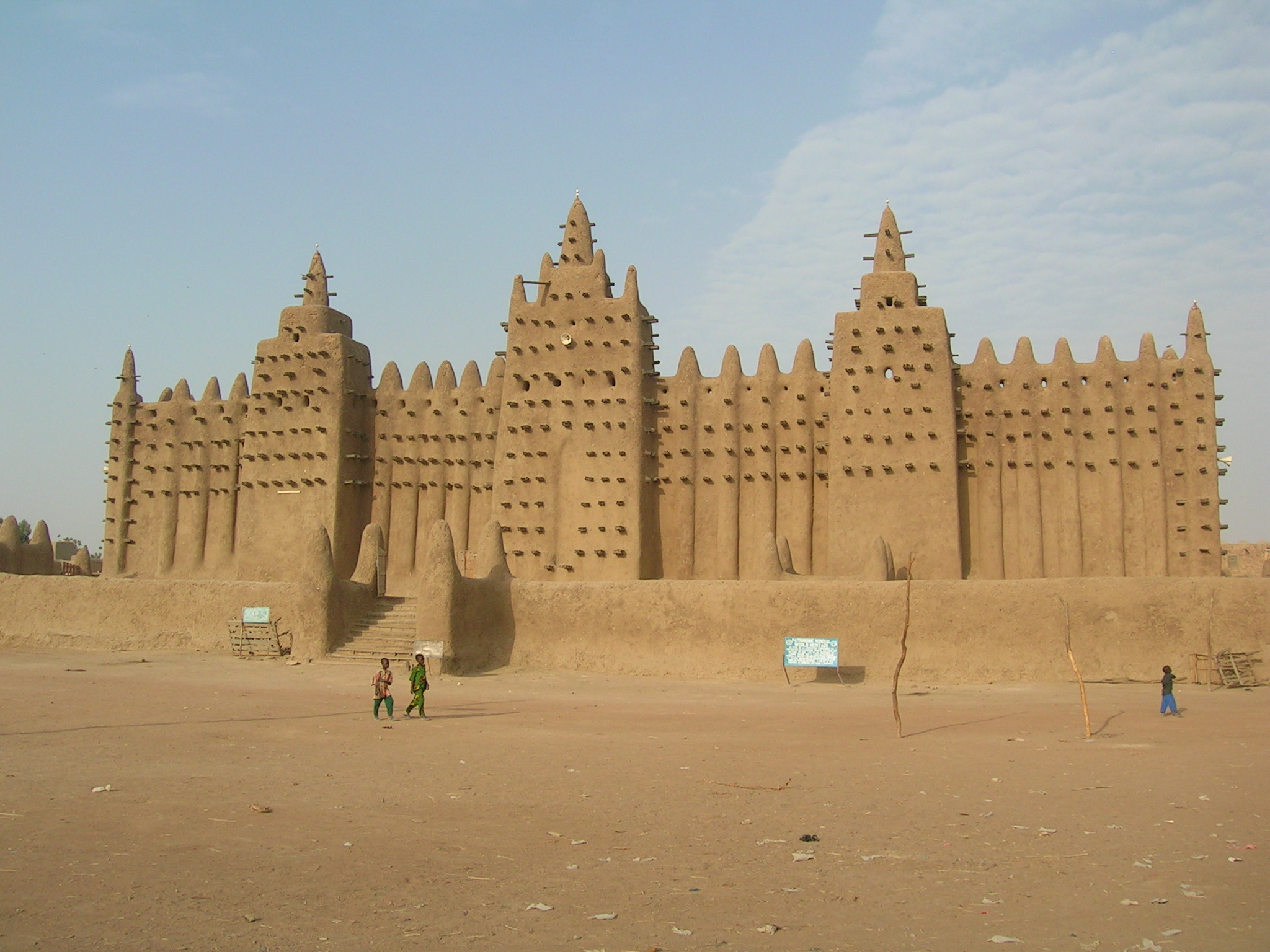
Great Mosque of Djenné built around the 13th century in Sudano-Sahelian style

Another indigenous style to West Africa is the Sudano-Sahelian with its use of mudbricks and adobe plaster, examples of this style include the Great Mosque of Djenné in Mali, the largest mud-brick building in sub-Saharan Africa, and the Agadez Grand Mosque, in Niger.

The Ottomans developed an architectural style characterized by large central domes (sometimes surrounded by multiple smaller domes), pencil-shaped minarets, and open façades. Mosques from the Ottoman period are still scattered across Eastern Europe, but the most rapid growth in the number of mosques in Europe has occurred within the past century as more Muslims have migrated to the continent. Many major European cities are home to mosques, like the Grand Mosque of Paris, that incorporate domes, minarets, and other features often found with mosques in Muslim-majority countries. The first mosque in North America was founded by Albanian Americans in 1915, but the continent's oldest surviving mosque, the Mother Mosque of America, was built in 1934. As in Europe, the number of American mosques has rapidly increased in recent decades as Muslim immigrants, particularly from South Asia, have come in the United States. Greater than forty percent of mosques in the United States were constructed after 2000.

== Religious functions ==
=== Prayers ===
Prayer at Jama Masjid in Delhi, India

There are two holidays (Eids) in the Islamic calendar: ʿĪd al-Fiṭr and ʿĪd al-Aḍḥā, during which there are special prayers held at mosques in the morning. These Eid prayers are supposed to be offered in large groups, and so, in the absence of an outdoor Eidgah, a large mosque will normally host them for their congregants as well as the congregants of smaller local mosques. Some mosques will even rent convention centers or other large public buildings to hold the large number of Muslims who attend. Mosques, especially those in countries where Muslims are the majority, will also host Eid prayers outside in courtyards, town squares or on the outskirts of town in an Eidgah.

=== Ramadan ===
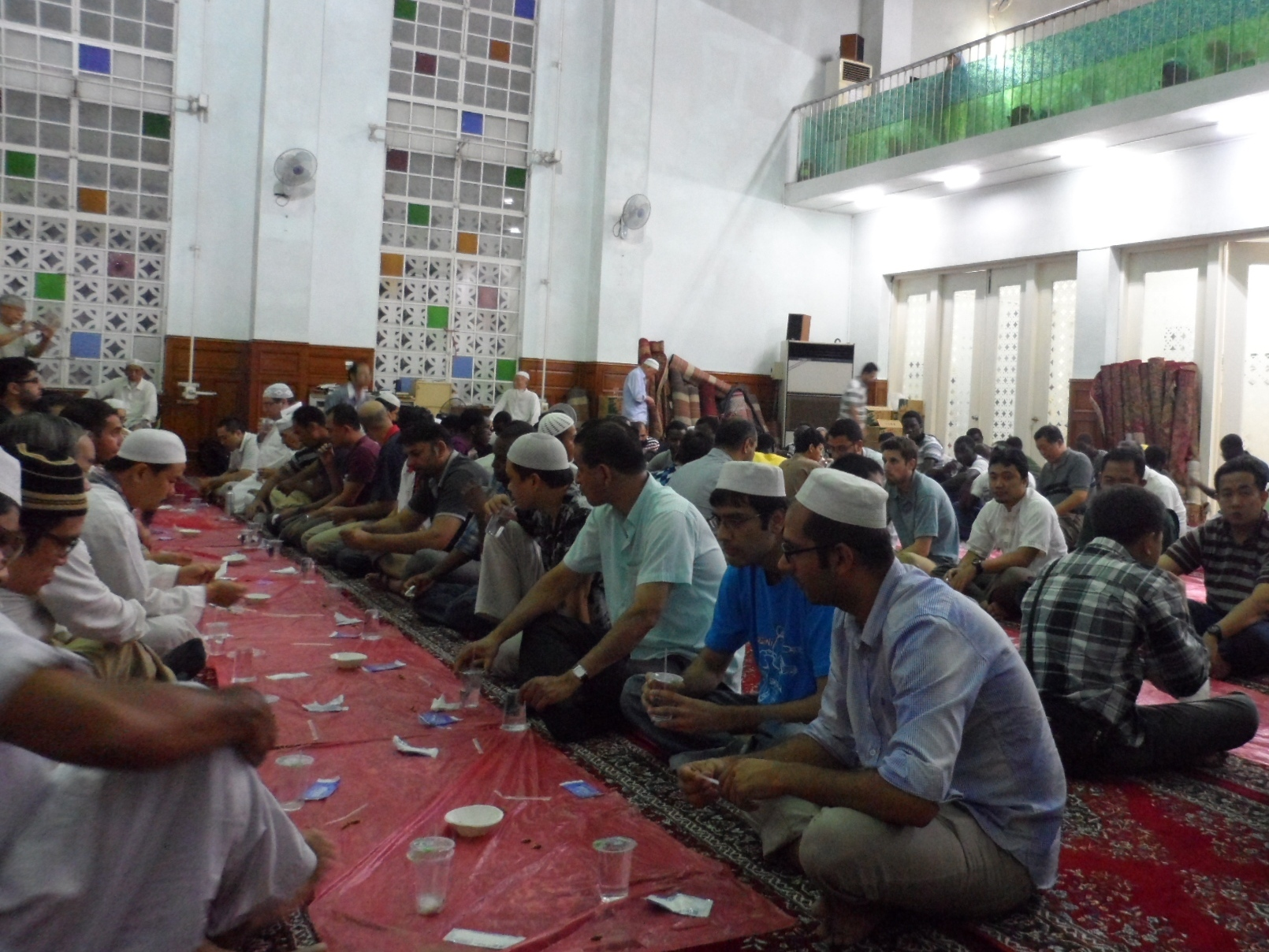
Iftar at Taipei Grand Mosque, Taiwan during Ramadan

Islam's holiest month, Ramaḍān, is observed through many events. As Muslims must fast during the day during Ramadan, mosques will host Ifṭār dinners after sunset and the fourth required prayer of the day, that is Maghrib. Food is provided, at least in part, by members of the community, thereby creating daily potluck dinners. Because of the community contribution necessary to serve iftar dinners, mosques with smaller congregations may not be able to host the iftar dinners daily. Some mosques will also hold Suḥūr meals before dawn to congregants attending the first required prayer of the day, Fajr. As with iftar dinners, congregants usually provide the food for suhoor, although able mosques may provide food instead. Mosques will often invite poorer members of the Muslim community to share in beginning and breaking the fasts, as providing charity during Ramadan is regarded in Islam as especially honorable.

Following the last obligatory daily prayer (ʿIshāʾ) special, optional Tarāwīḥ prayers are offered in larger mosques. During each night of prayers, which can last for up to two hours each night, usually one member of the community who has memorized the entire Quran (a Hafiz) will recite a segment of the book. Sometimes, several such people (not necessarily of the local community) take turns to do this. During the last ten days of Ramadan, larger mosques will host all-night programs to observe Laylat al-Qadr, the night Muslims believe that Muhammad first received Quranic revelations. On that night, between sunset and sunrise, mosques employ speakers to educate congregants in attendance about Islam. Mosques or the community usually provide meals periodically throughout the night

During the last ten days of Ramadan, larger mosques within the Muslim community will host Iʿtikāf, a practice in which at least one Muslim man from the community must participate. Muslims performing itikaf are required to stay within the mosque for ten consecutive days, often in worship or learning about Islam. As a result, the rest of the Muslim community is responsible for providing the participants with food, drinks, and whatever else they need during their stay.

=== Charity ===
The third of the Five Pillars of Islam states that Muslims are required to give approximately one-fortieth of their wealth to charity as Zakat. Since mosques form the center of Muslim communities, they are where Muslims go to both give zakat and, if necessary, collect it. Before the holiday of Eid ul-Fitr, mosques also collect a special zakat that is supposed to assist in helping poor Muslims attend the prayers and celebrations associated with the holiday.

== Architecture ==
=== Styles ===
Four types of Mosques

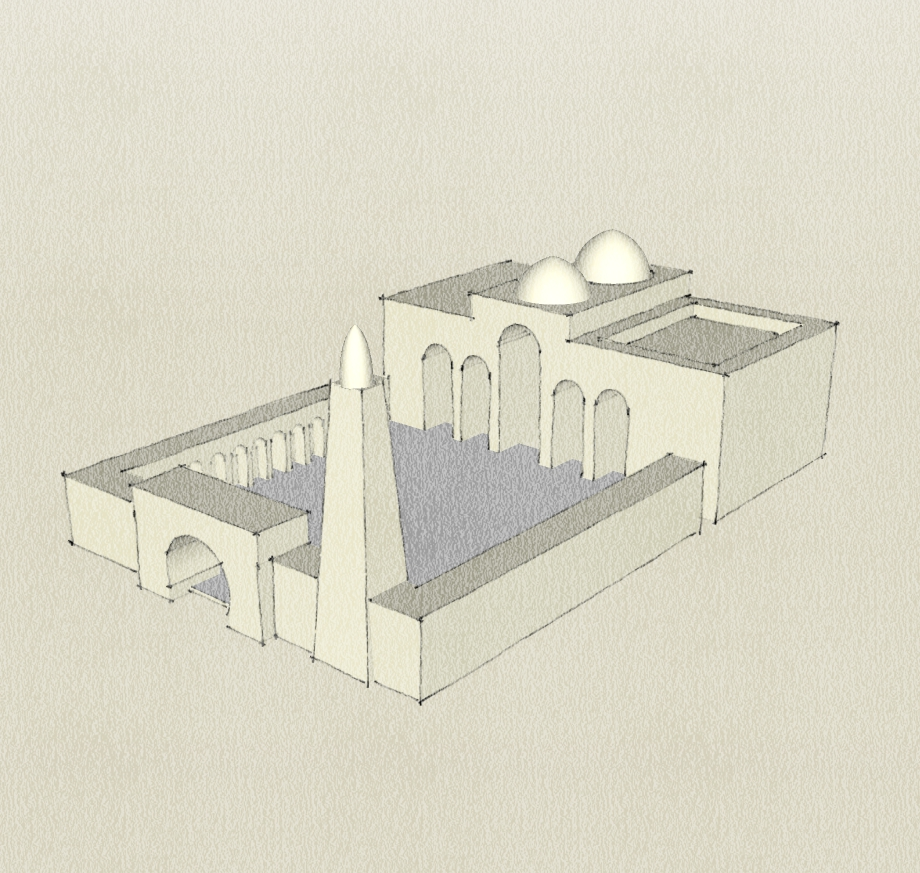
Hypostyle Mosque

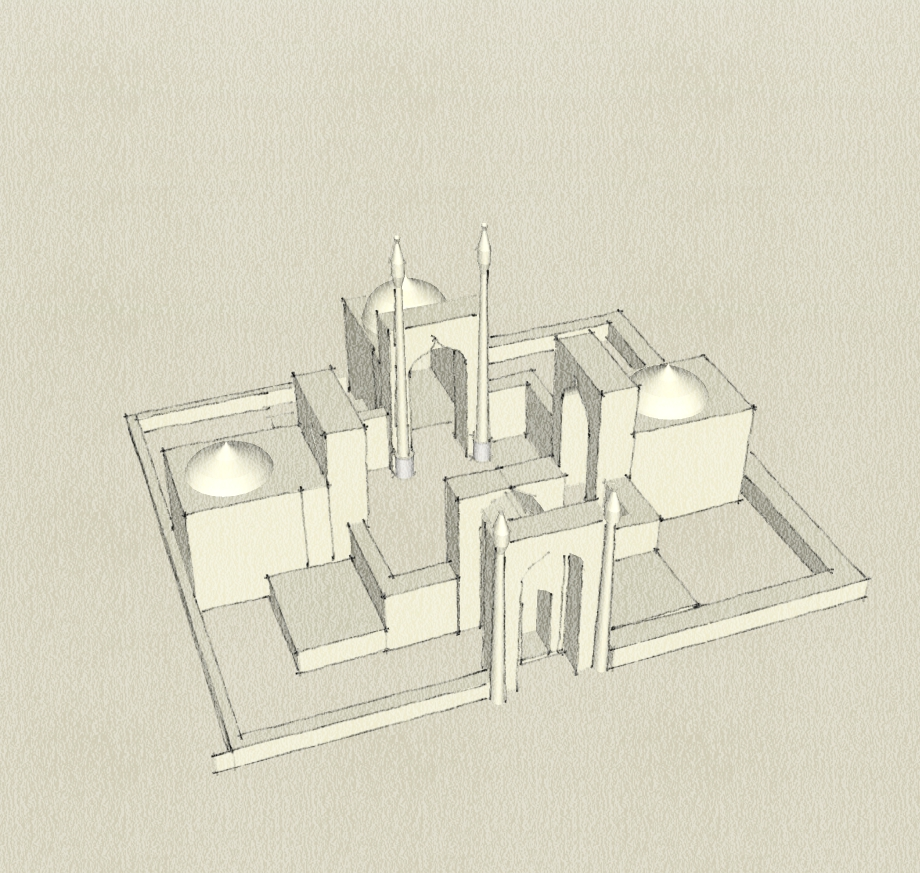
Four-Iwan Mosque

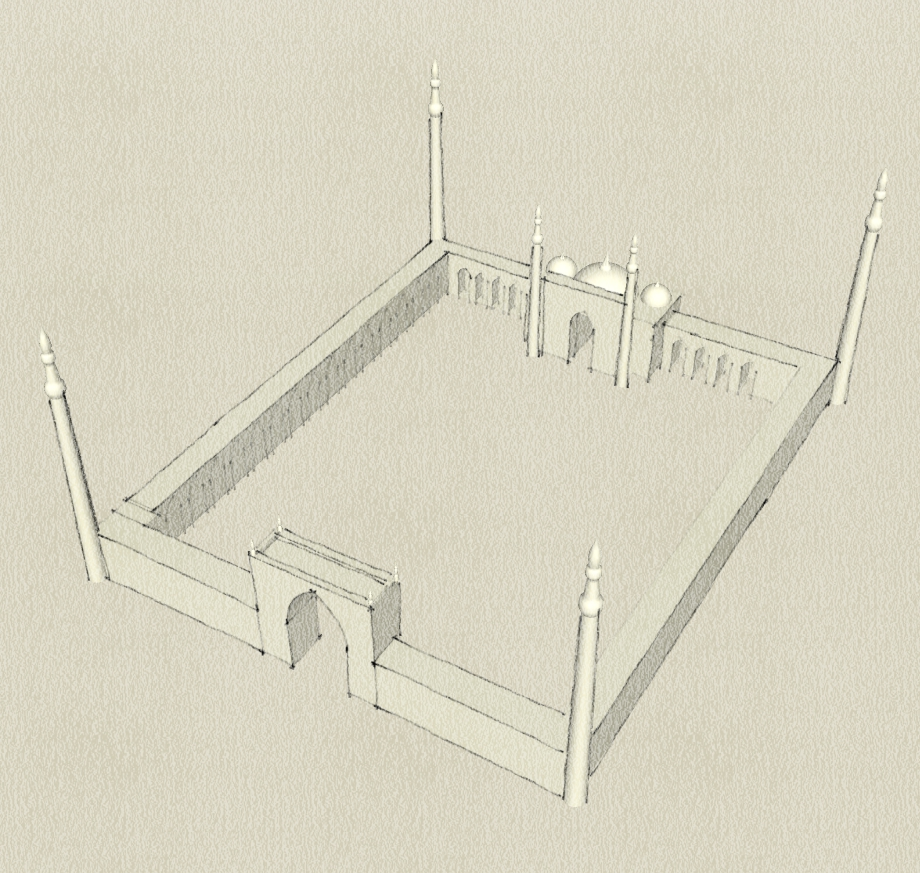
Three-Domed Mosque

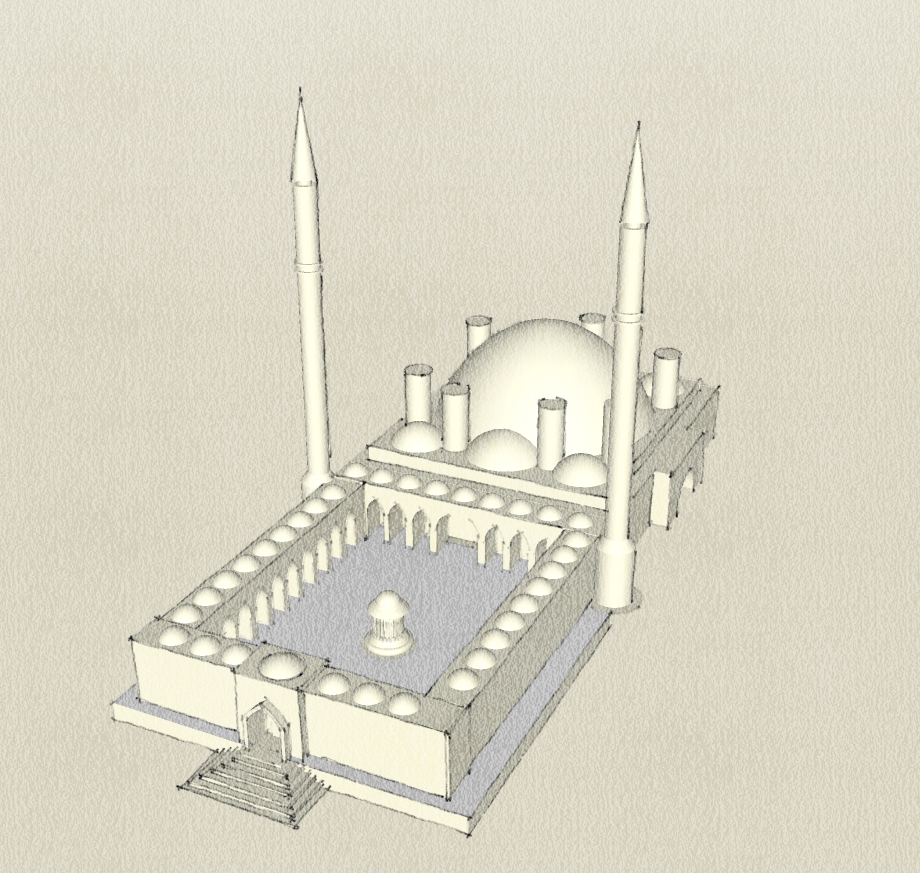
Central-Domed Mosque

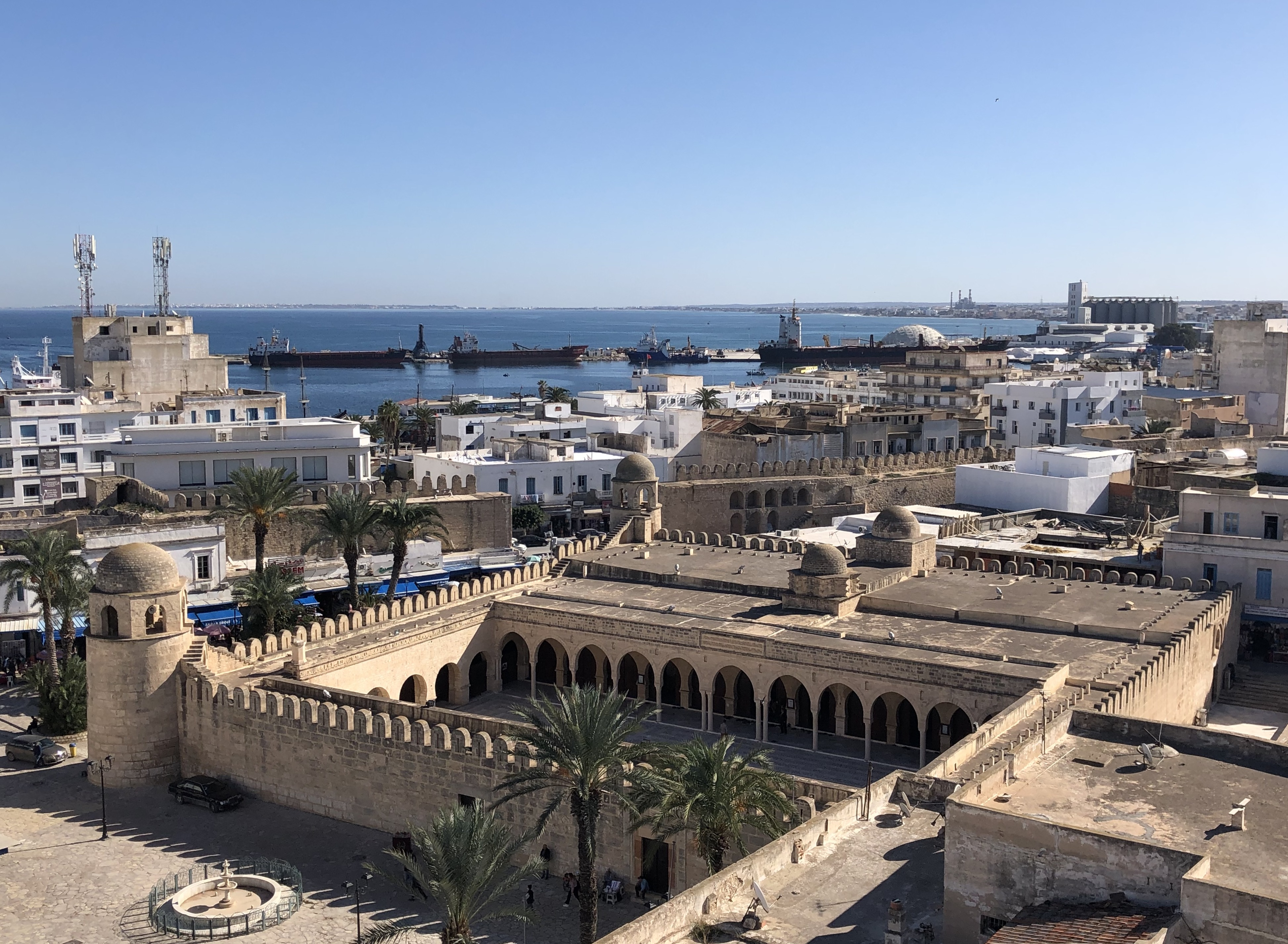
The Great Mosque of Sousse is an example of a hypostyle prayer hall mosque with a courtyard (sahn) surrounded by arcades (riwaqs)

Arab-plan or hypostyle mosques are the earliest type of mosques, pioneered under the Umayyad Dynasty, and based on the plan of the early Prophet's mosque in Medina. These mosques have square or rectangular plans with an enclosed courtyard (sahn) and covered prayer hall. Historically, in the warm Middle Eastern and Mediterranean climates, the courtyard served to accommodate the large number of worshippers during Friday prayers. Most early hypostyle mosques had flat roofs on prayer halls, which required the use of numerous columns and supports. Frequently, hypostyle mosques have outer arcades (riwaq) so that visitors can enjoy the shade. Arab-plan mosques were constructed mostly under the Umayyad and Abbasid dynasties. The simplicity of the Arab plan limited the opportunities for further development, the mosques consequently losing popularity. One of the most notable hypostyle mosques is the Great Mosque of Cordoba in Spain, the building being supported by over 850 columns, other notable examples include the Umayyad Mosques of Damascus and Aleppo in Syria, the now-ruined Great Mosques of Al-Malwiya and Abu Dulaf in Samarra and the Qibli Mosque (the main mosque within the Al-Aqsa Mosque Compound) in Jerusalem, in addition to the Great Mosque of Kairouan, and Al-Zaytuna Mosque in Tunisia and Al-Qarawiyyin Mosque in Fez. Al-Azhar Mosque, Al-Hakim Mosque and the Mosque of Ibn Tulun in Cairo.

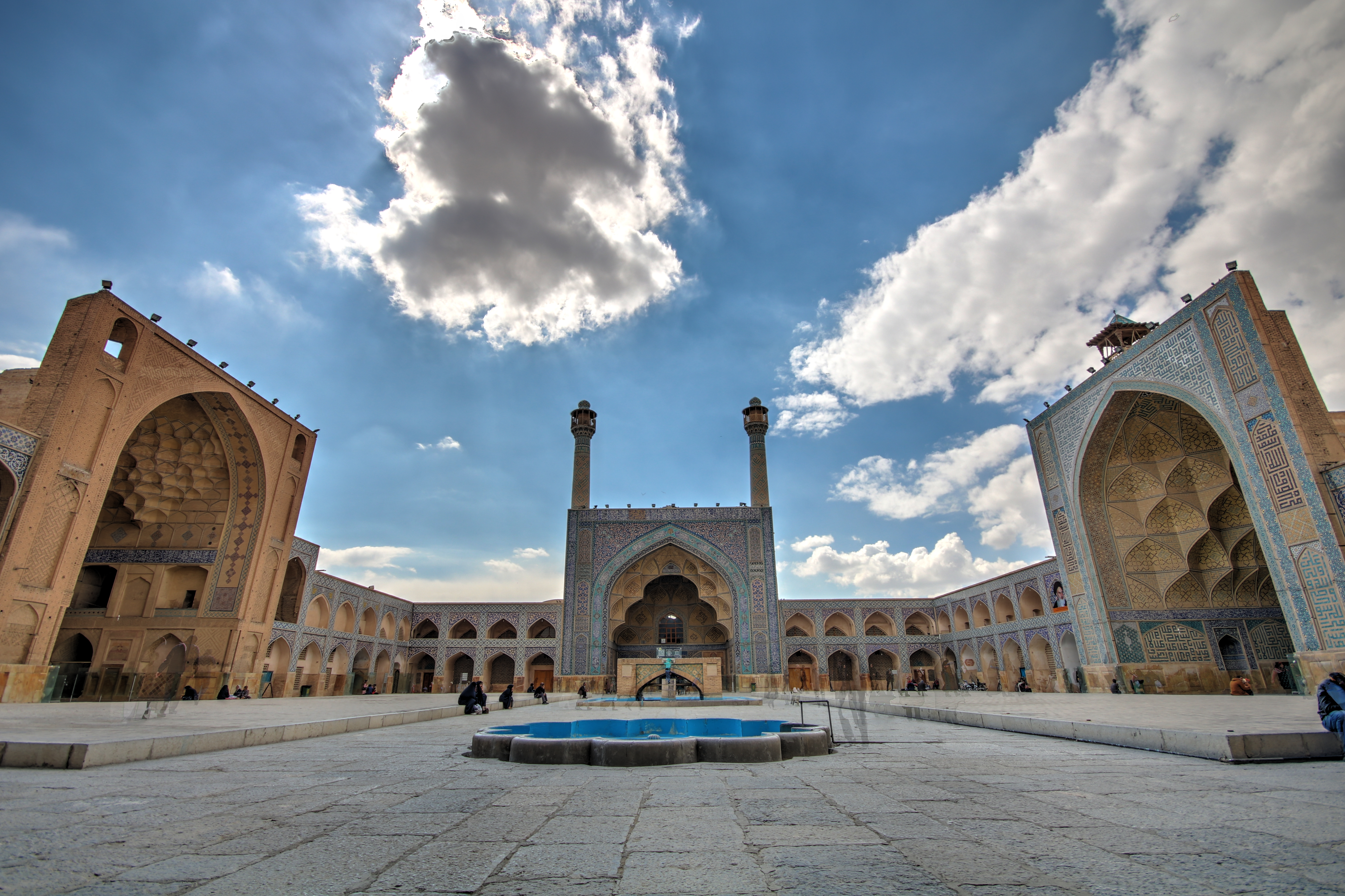
Main courtyard of the Jameh Mosque of Isfahan, with a four-iwan layout typical of mosques in Iran and Central Asia

The first departure within mosque design started in Persia (Iran). The Persians had inherited a rich architectural legacy from the earlier Persian dynasties, and they began incorporating elements from earlier Parthian and Sassanid designs into their mosques, influenced by buildings such as the Palace of Ardashir and the Sarvestan Palace. Thus, Islamic architecture witnessed the introduction of such structures as domes and large, arched entrances, referred to as iwans. During Seljuq rule, as Islamic mysticism was on the rise, the four-iwan arrangement took form. The four-iwan format, finalized by the Seljuqs, and later inherited by the Safavids, firmly established the courtyard façade of such mosques, with the towering gateways at every side, as more important than the actual buildings themselves. They typically took the form of a square-shaped central courtyard with large entrances at each side, giving the impression of gateways to the spiritual world. The Persians also introduced Persian gardens into mosque designs. Soon, a distinctly Persian style of mosques started appearing that would significantly influence the designs of later Timurid, and also Mughal, mosque designs. A prominent example of the four-Iwan layout mosque outside of Central Asia is the Mosque of Sultan Hasan in Cairo, an anomalous in Mamluk architecture.

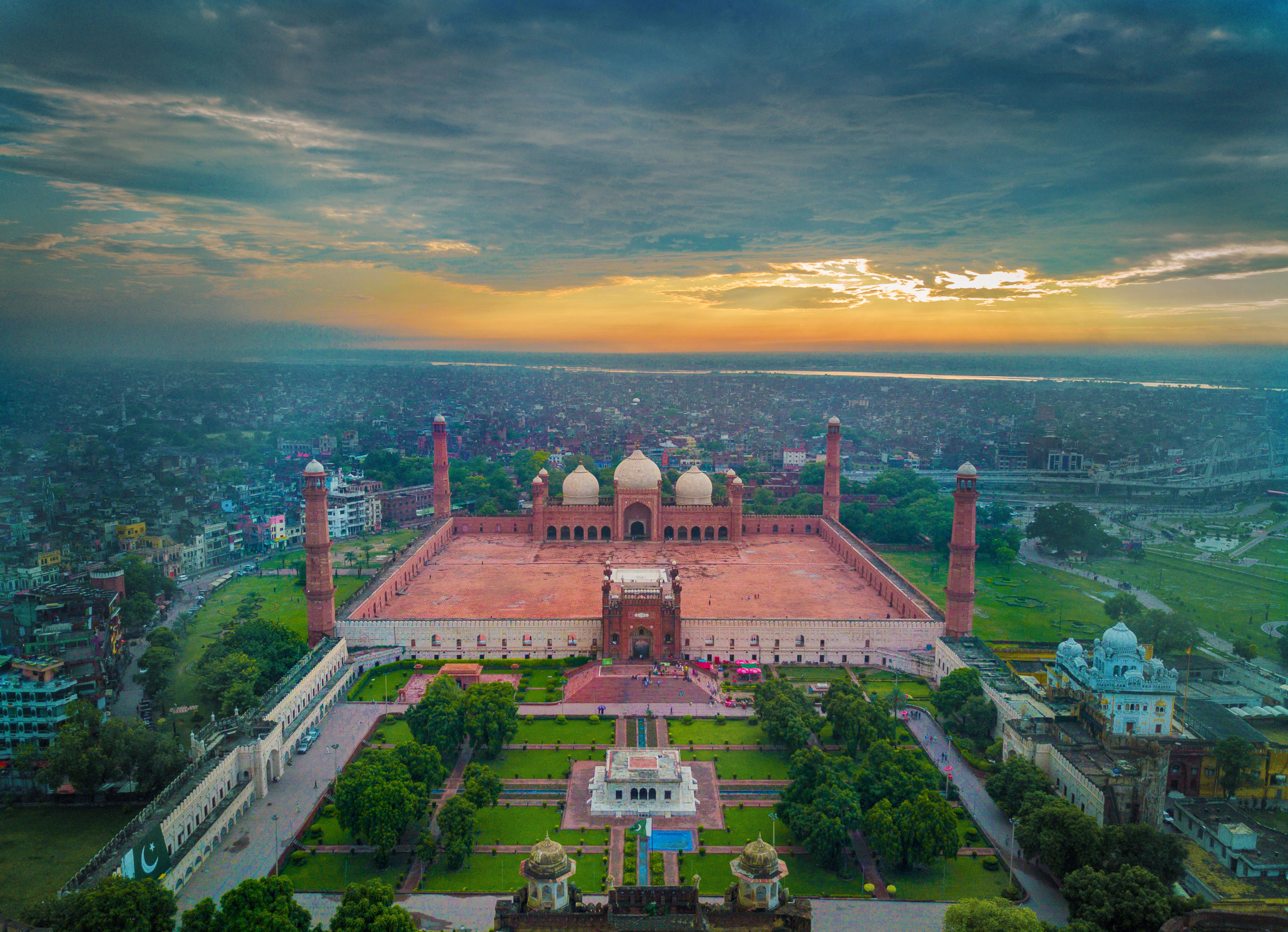
Badshahi Mosque in Lahore, is an example of a three-dome mosque found in India, Pakistan and Bangladesh.

The three-dome layout is a prominent plan in South Asia, it was developed as a result of the fusion between Islamic architecture and local South Asian traditions during the Mughal era, which created a three-dome mosque style with an extensive walled courtyard. the most notable examples of that are influenced by this plan are the Jama Masjid and Moti Masjid in India, the Badshahi Mosque, Dai Anga Mosque, and Sunehri Mosque in Pakistan, and the One Row Mosque, Sat Gambuj Mosque, and Nayabad Mosque in Bangladesh.

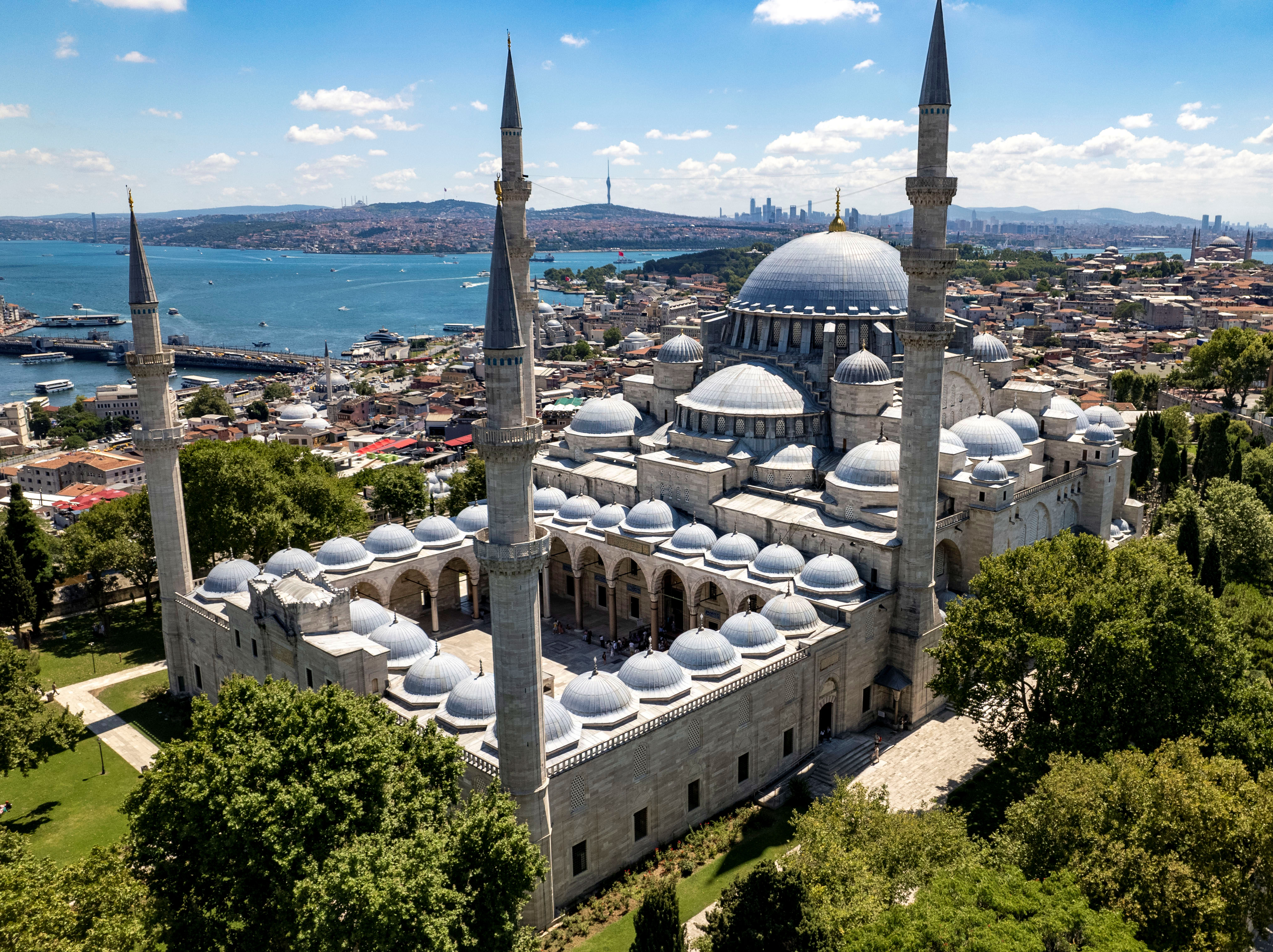
Süleymaniye Mosque in Istanbul, with a central dome layout typical of mosques in Turkey and the Balkans

The Ottomans introduced central dome mosques in the 15th century. These mosques combine the courtyard characteristic of the early Islamic mosques with a large central-domed prayer hall. In addition to having a large central dome, a common feature is smaller domes that exist off-center over the prayer hall or throughout the rest of the mosque, where prayer is not performed. This style was heavily influenced by Byzantine architecture with its use of large central domes. One of the most notable imperial Ottoman mosques is the Süleymaniye Mosque in Istanbul, the mosque has foundations that go 12 m into the ground, and it is covered by a large central dome that measures 26 meters in diameter, that is contained within 2 semi-domes, and small domes on either side that measure between 5 and 10 m in diameter. On the other hand, the latter bigger dome of the Selimiye Mosque in Edrine, which measures 31.1 m in diameter, is held by giant squinches instead of the semi-domes. Both mosques are considered to be the best works of Mimar Sinan.

Examples of other historical mosque architectural styles

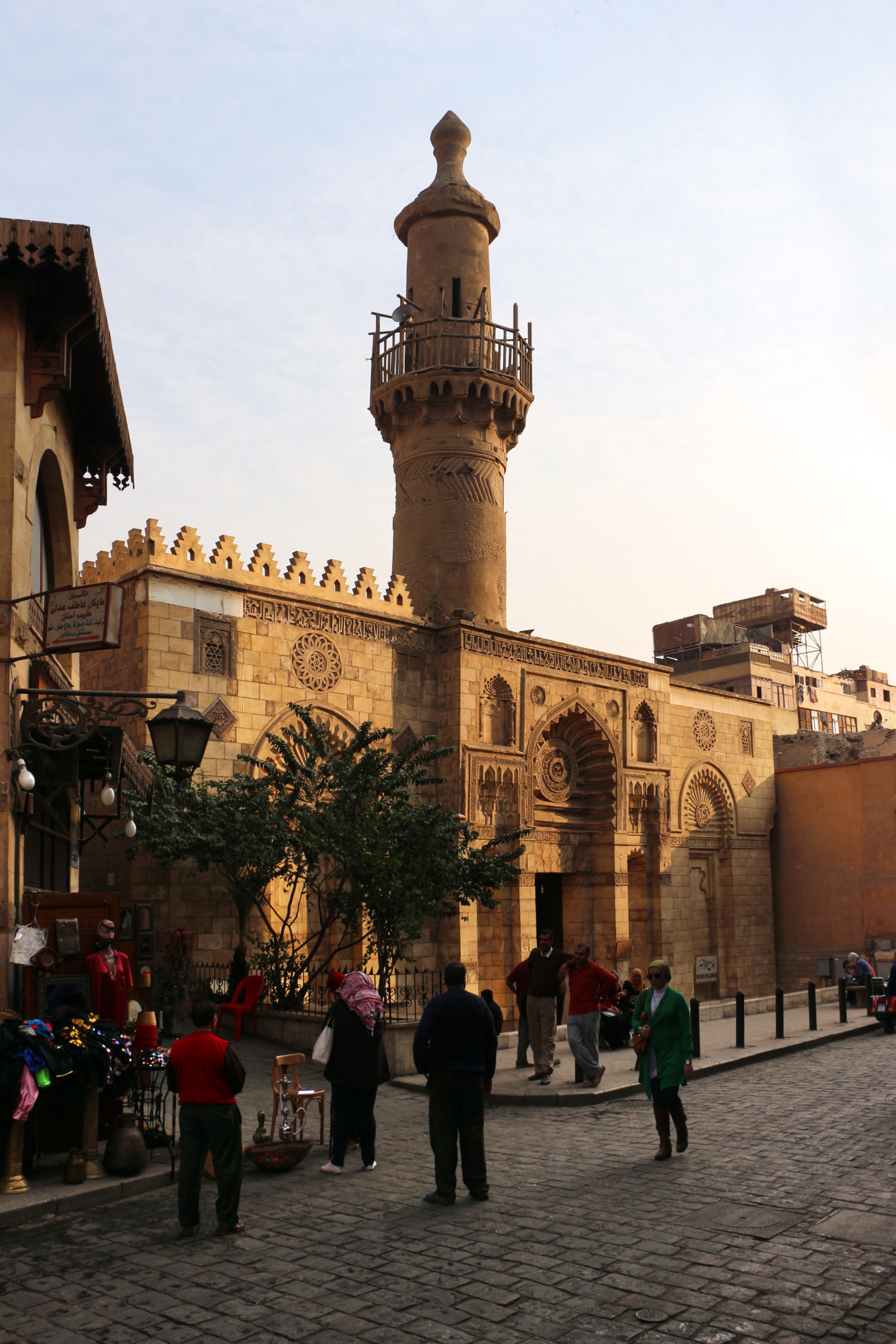
Aqmar Mosque, Cairo, Egypt (built in 1125–6)

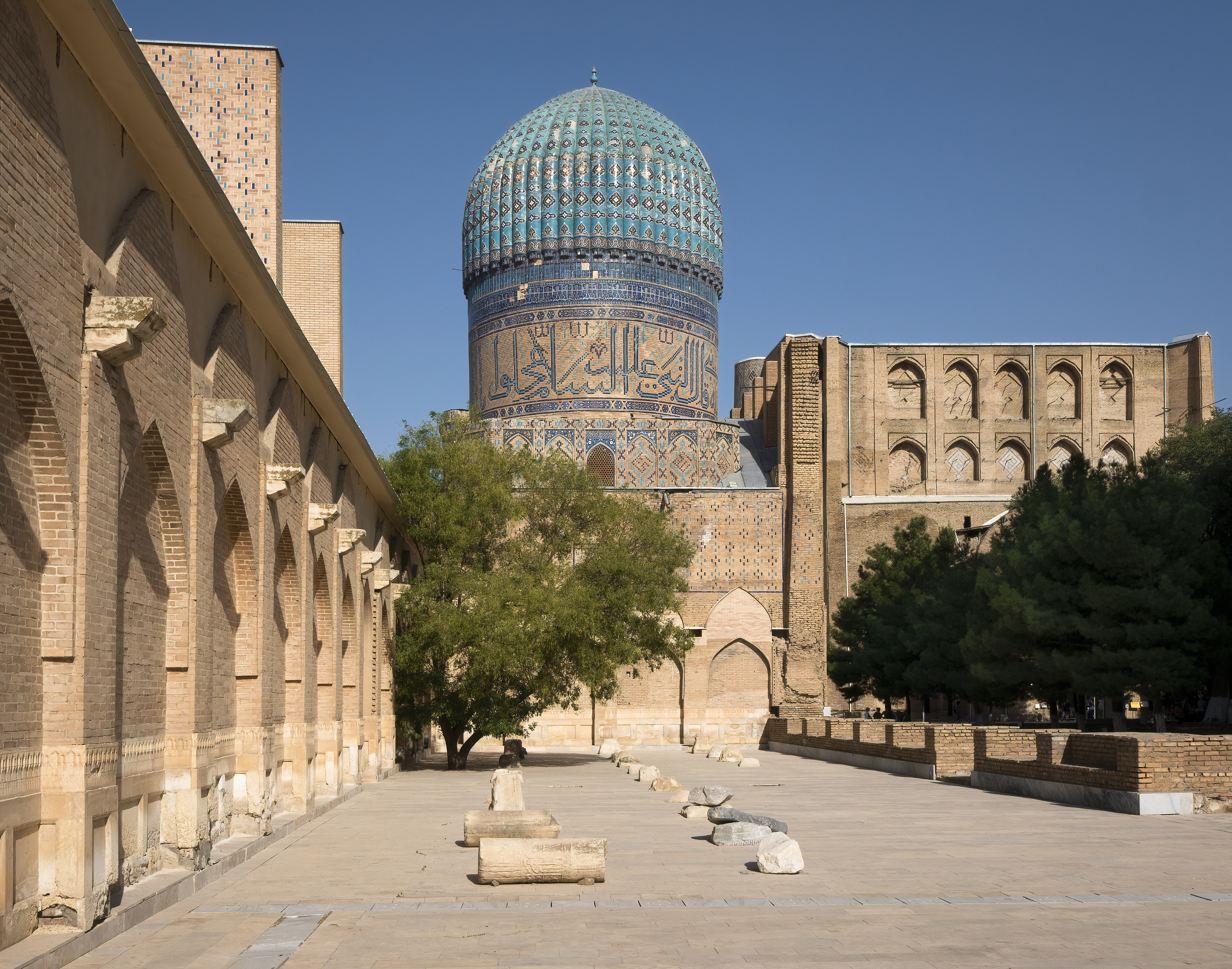
Bibi-Khanym Mosque, Samarkand, Uzbekistan (completed in 1404)

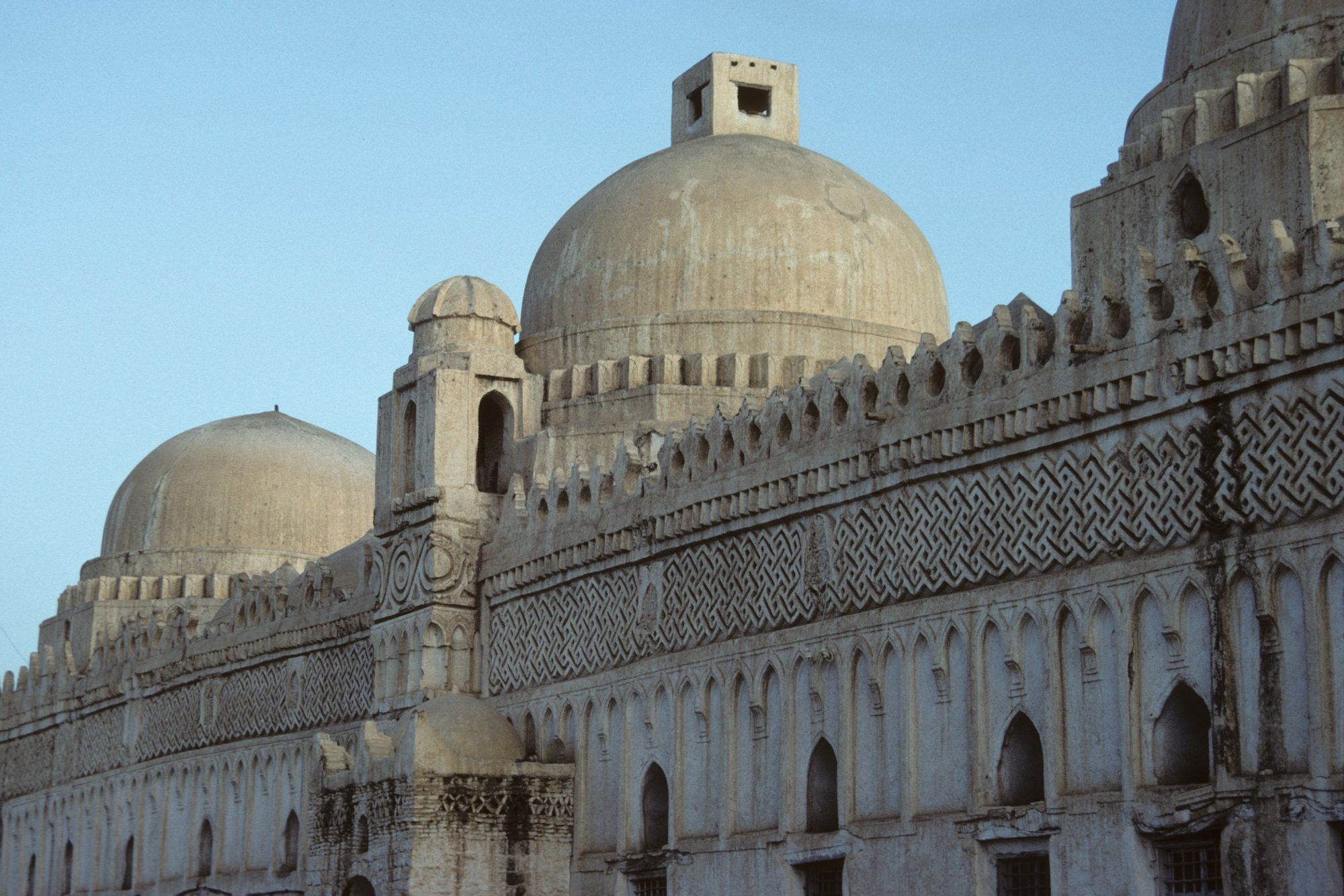
Mudhaffar Mosque, Taiz, Yemen (13th century)

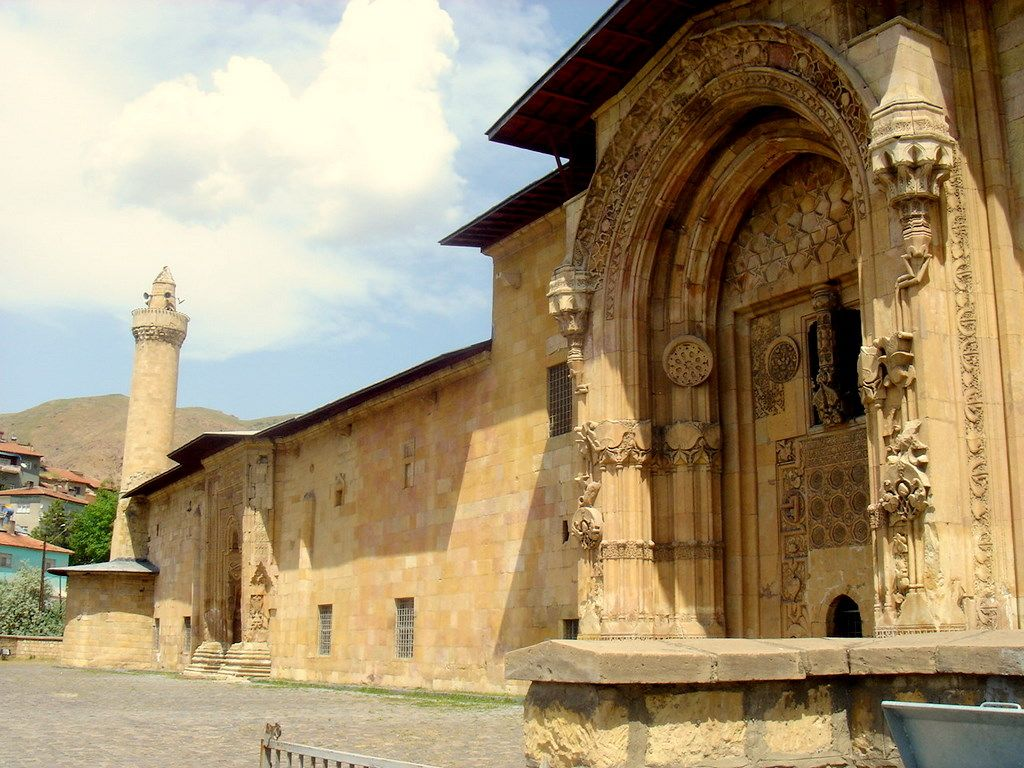
Divriği Great Mosque, Divriği, Turkey (built in 1228–9)

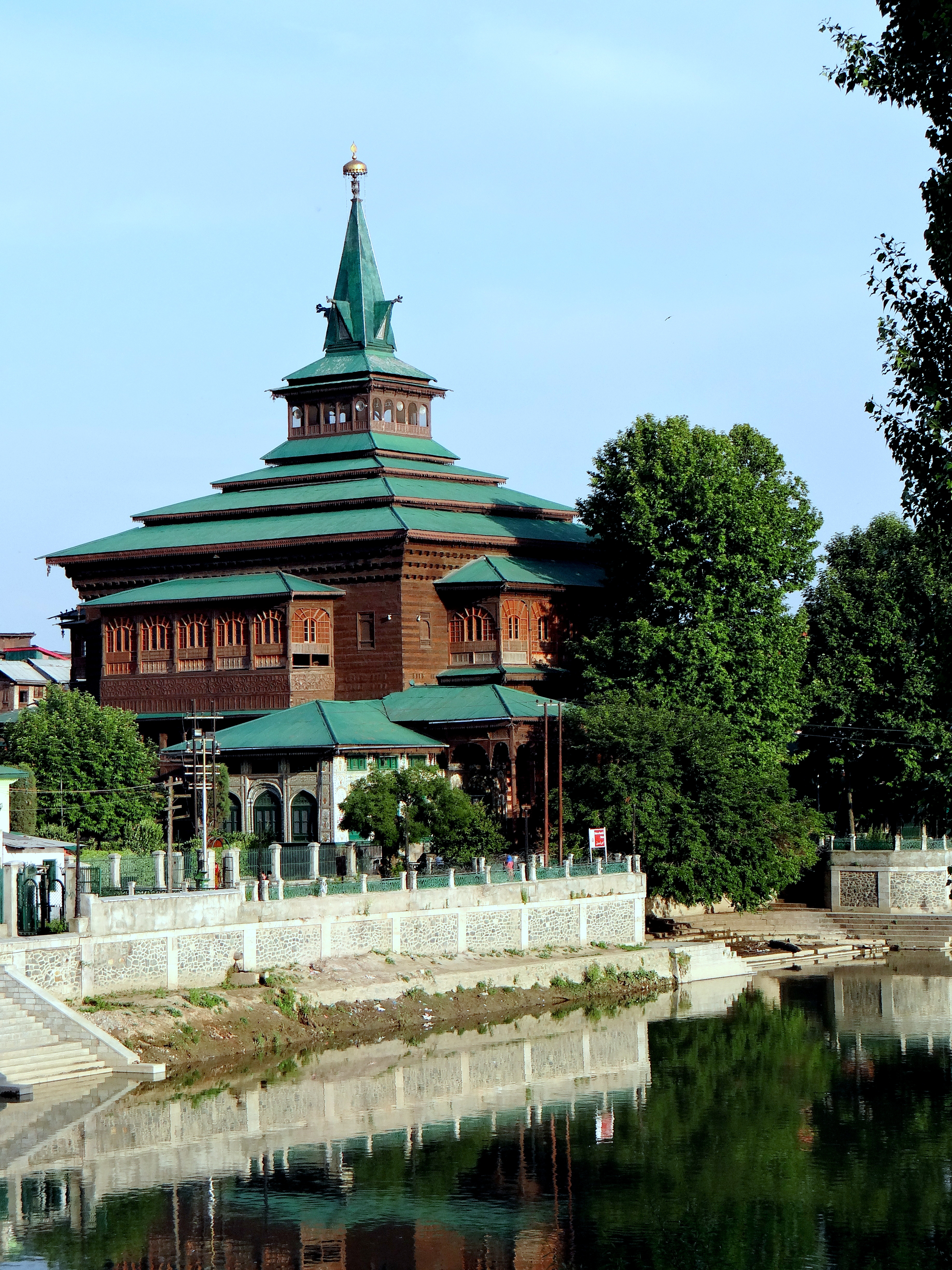
The Khanqah-e-Moula, a 14th-century mosque in Srinagar, Jammu and Kashmir, India

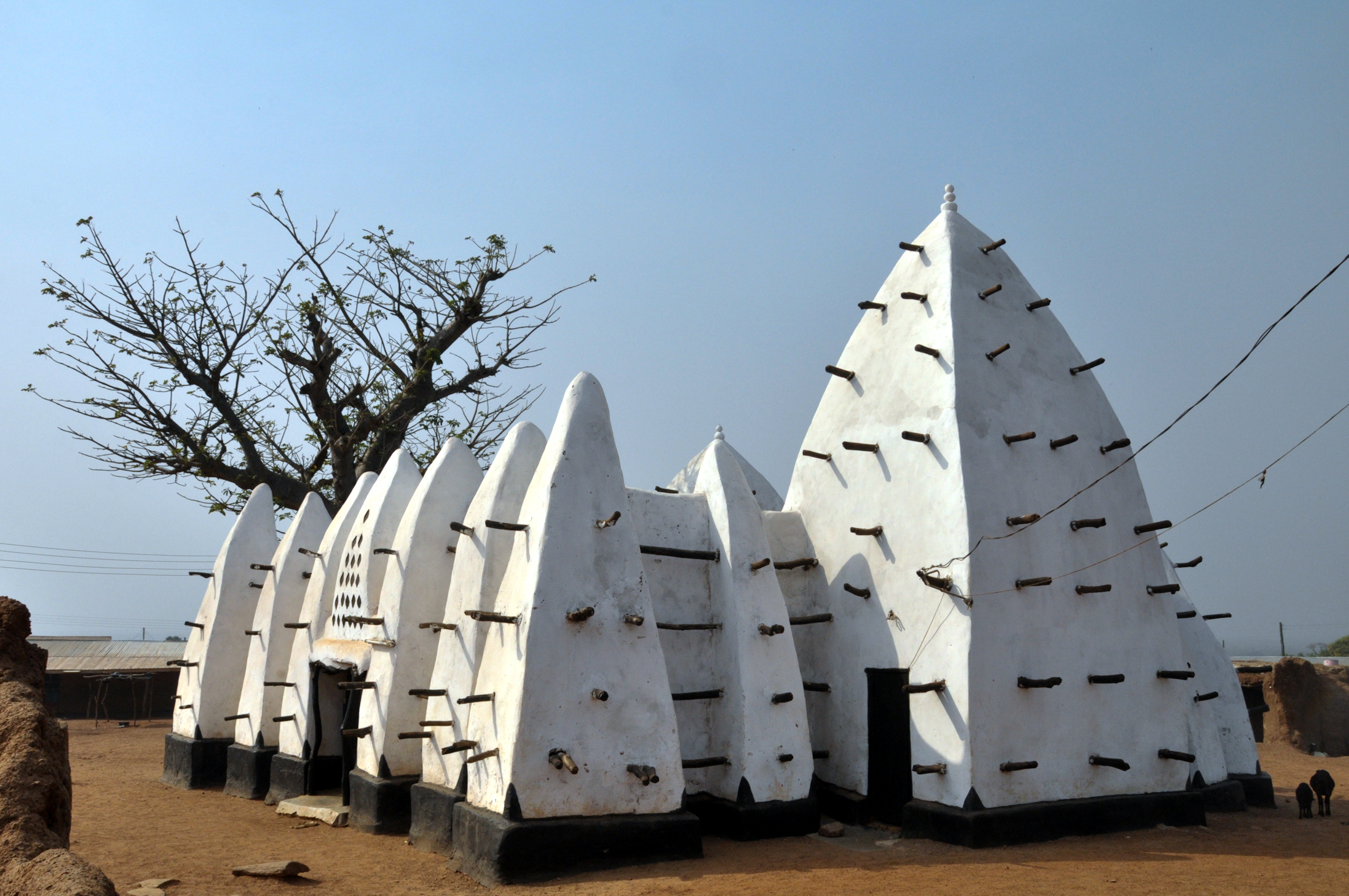
Larabanga Mosque, Ghana founded in 1421

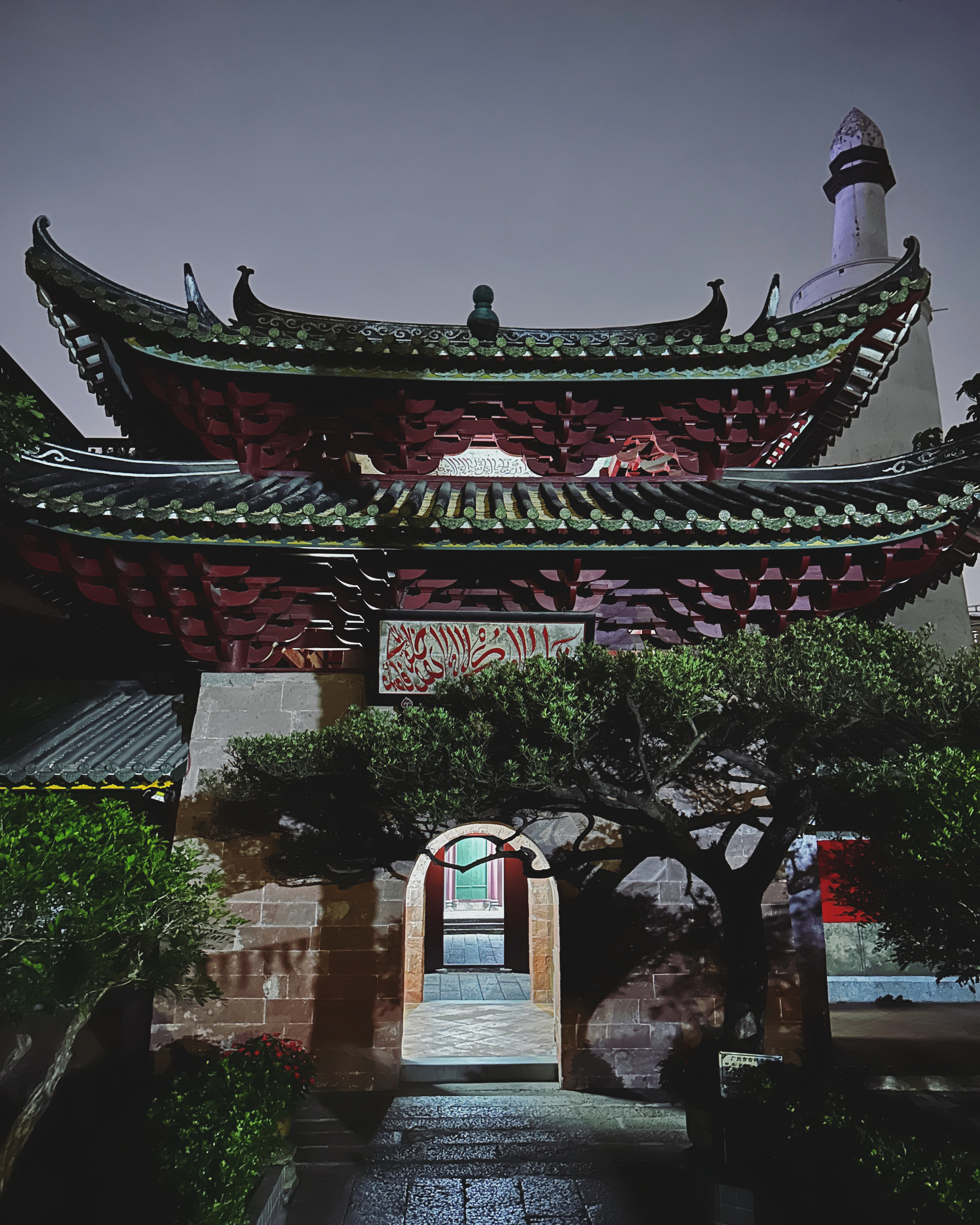
Huaisheng Mosque in Guangzhou, China, dating back to 627 CE

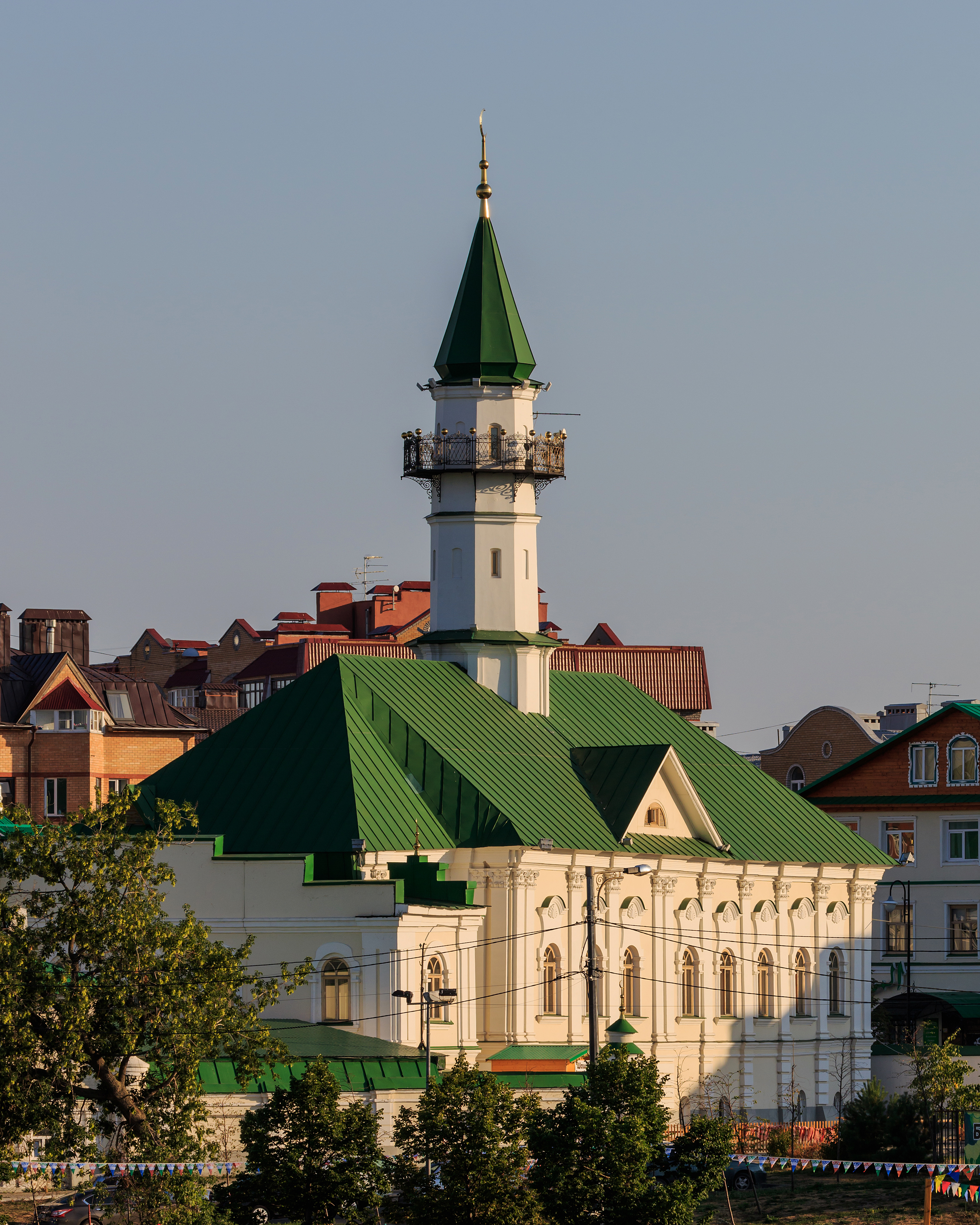
Marjani Mosque, oldest active mosque in Tatarstan, Russia (completed in 1770)

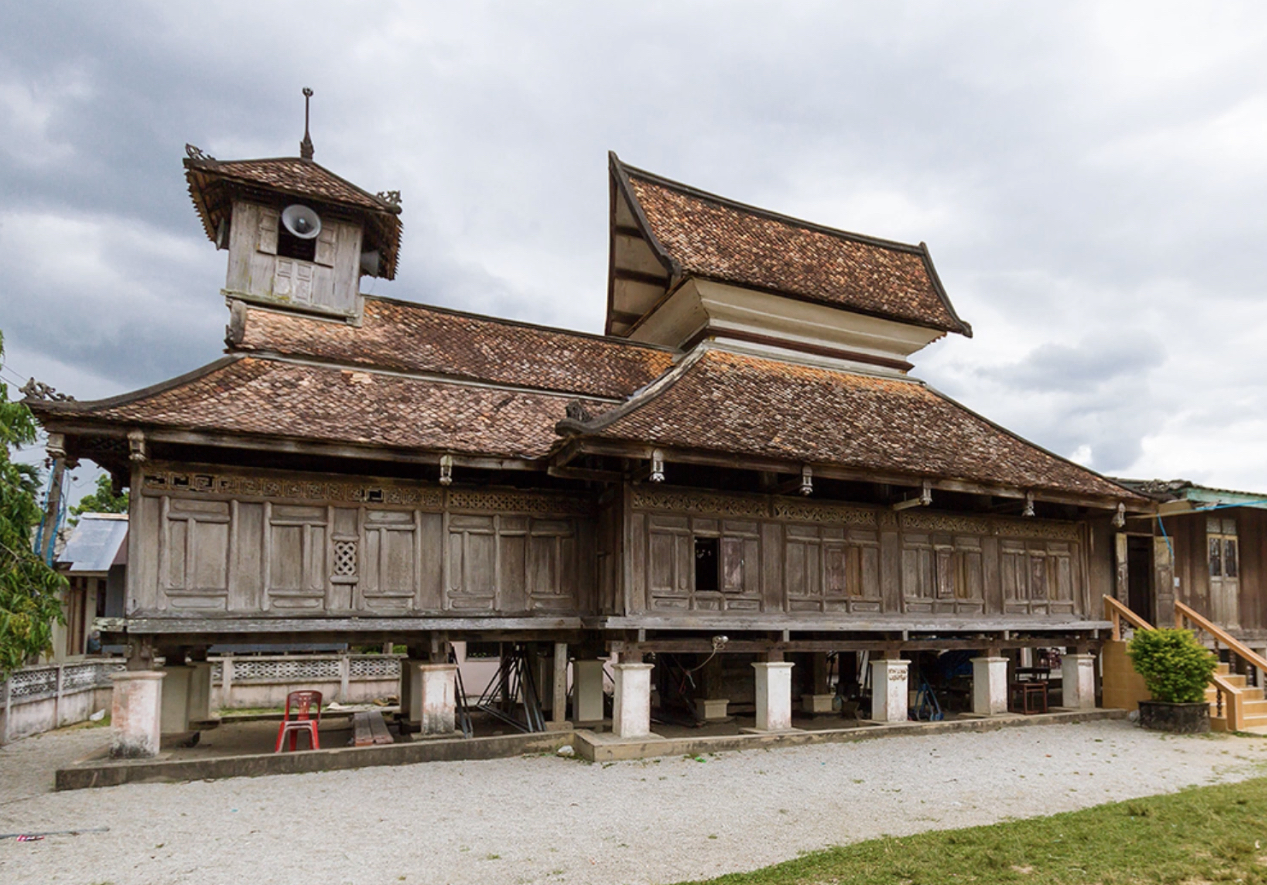
Talo Mano Mosque, in Narathiwat, Thailand built in 1634

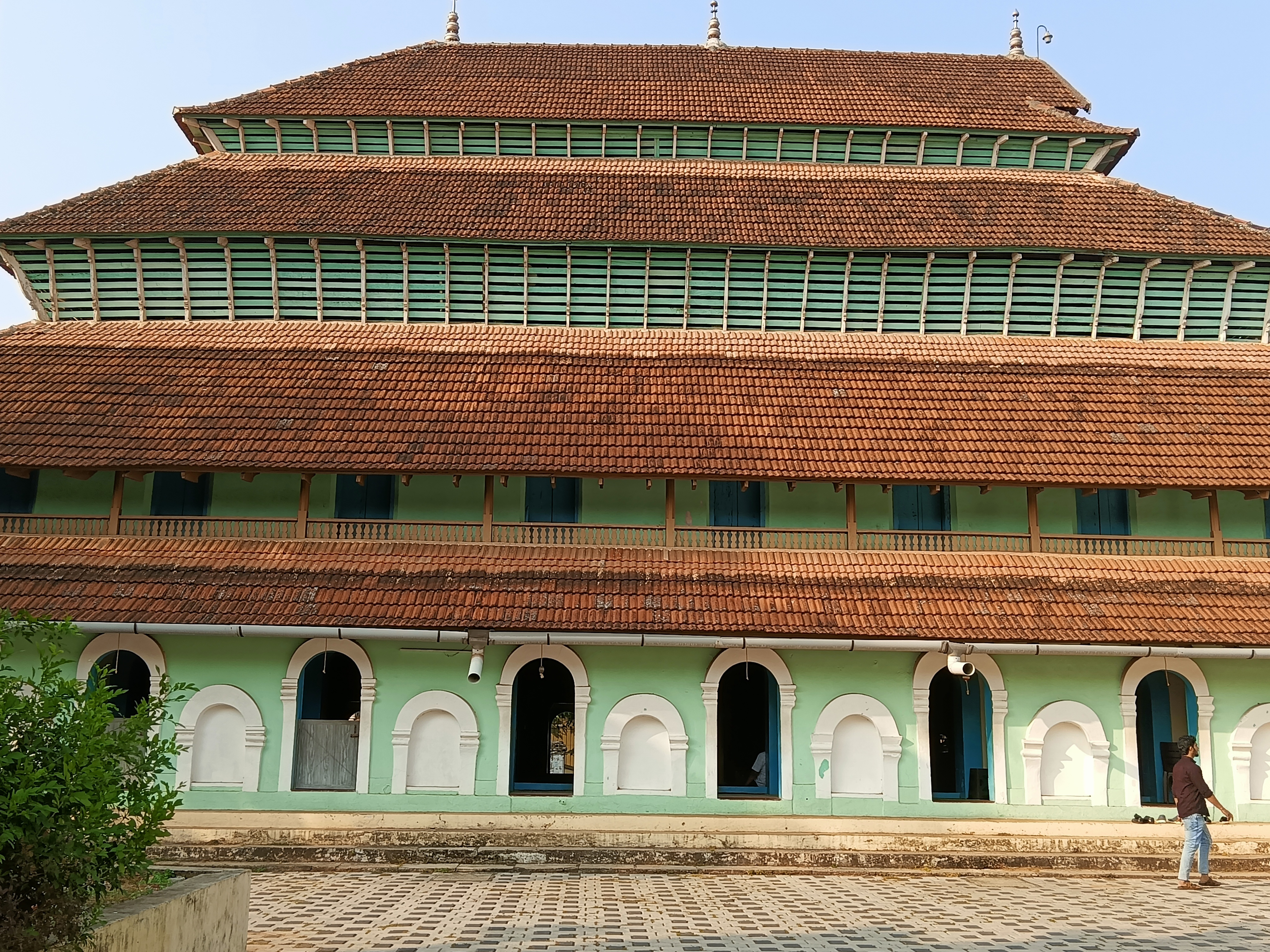
Mishkal Mosque, Calicut, Kerala, India, dating back to the 14th century

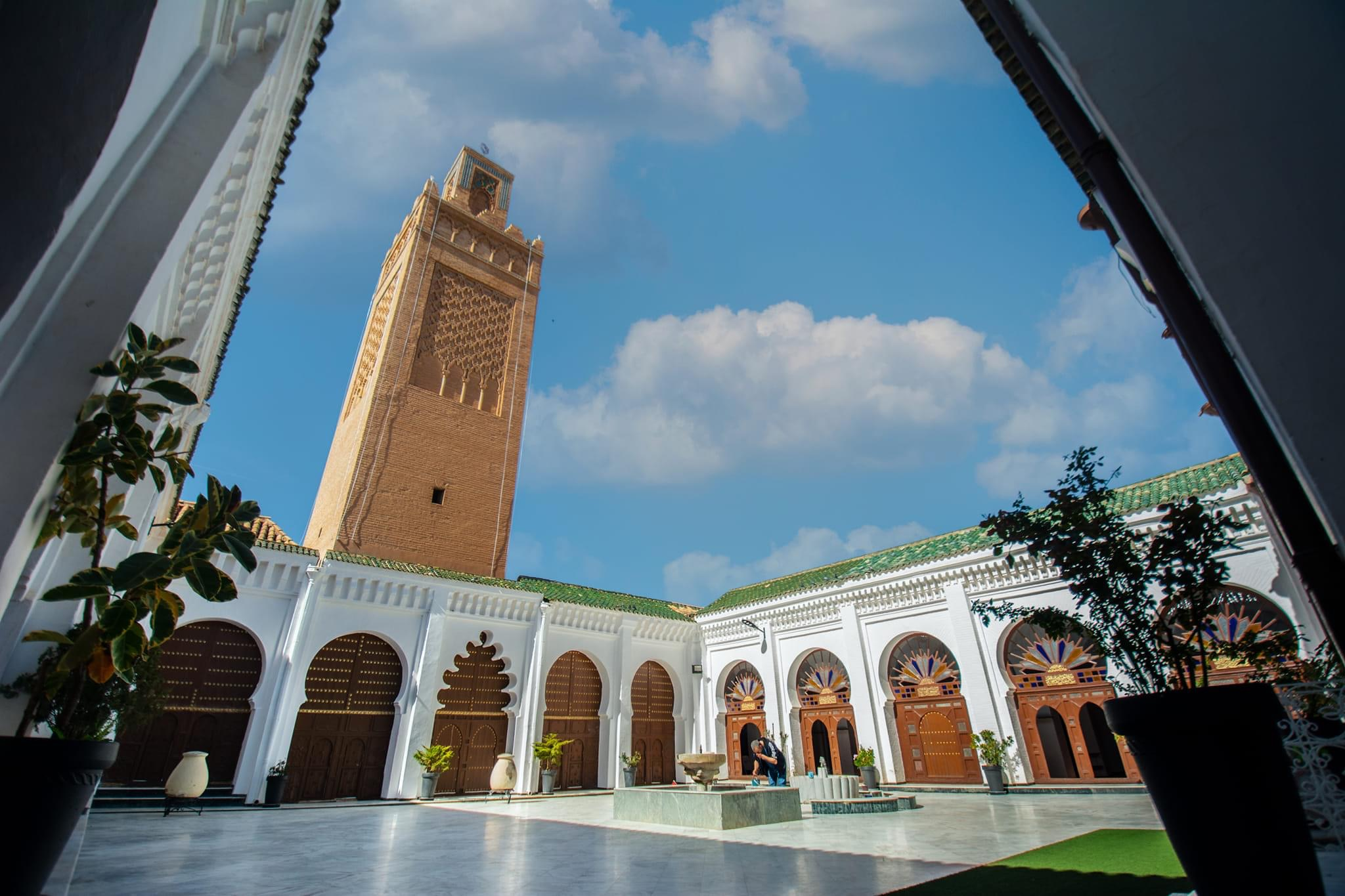
Great Mosque of Tlemcen, in Algeria, its minaret and courtyard date to 1236

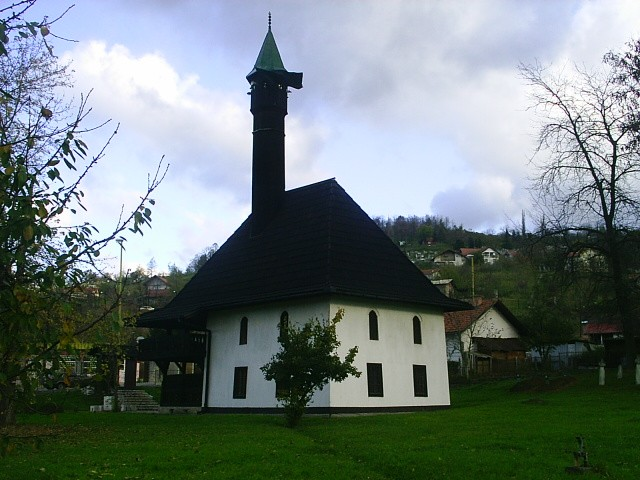
Huseina Čauša Džamija, 17th-century traditional wooden mosque in Tuzla, Bosnia and Herzegovina

==== Decoration ====
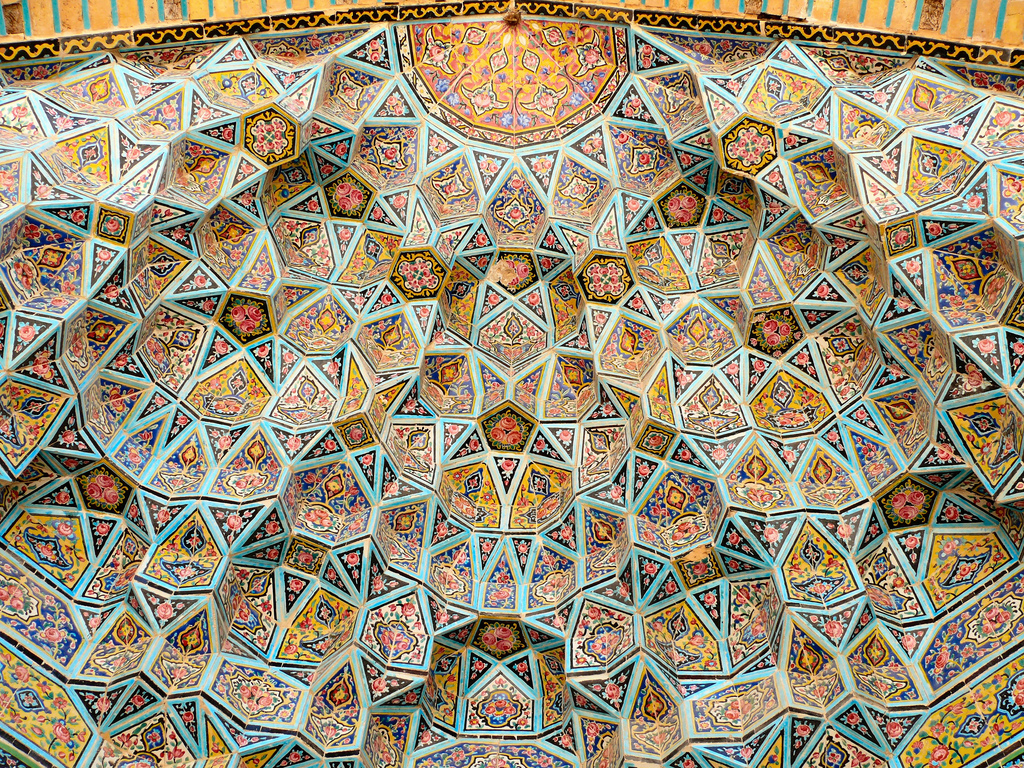
Muqarnas vault in the Nasir al-Mulk Mosque in Shiraz, Iran

Islam forbids figurative art, on the grounds that the artist must not imitate God's creation. Mosques are, therefore, decorated with abstract patterns and beautiful inscriptions. Decoration is often concentrated around doorways and the miḥrāb. Tiles are used widely in mosques. They lend themselves to pattern-making, can be made with beautiful subtle colors, and can create a cool atmosphere, an advantage in the hot Arab countries. Quotations from the Quran often adorn mosque interiors. These texts are meant to inspire people by their beauty, while also reminding them of the words of Allah.

=== Prayer hall ===
The prayer hall, also known as the muṣallá (Arabic: مُصَلَّى), rarely has furniture; chairs and pews are generally absent from the prayer hall so as to allow as many worshipers as possible to line the room. Some mosques have Islamic calligraphy and Quranic verses on the walls to create a more religious atmosphere for worshippers.

Often, a limited part of the prayer hall is sanctified formally as a masjid in the sharīʿah sense (although the term masjid is also used for the larger mosque complex as well). Once designated, there are onerous limitations on the use of this formally designated masjid, and it may not be used for any purpose other than worship; restrictions that do not necessarily apply to the rest of the prayer area, and to the rest of the mosque complex (although such uses may be restricted by the conditions of the waqf that owns the mosque).

In many mosques, especially the early congregational mosques, the prayer hall is built in the hypostyle form (the roof held up by a multitude of columns). One of the finest examples of the hypostyle-plan mosques is the Great Mosque of Kairouan in Tunisia.

Usually opposite the entrance to the prayer hall is the qibla wall (the direction of Mecca, and thus the direction towards which Muslims should face for prayer), the visually emphasized area inside the prayer hall. The qibla wall should, in a properly oriented mosque, be set perpendicular to a line leading to Mecca, where the Kaaba is located. Congregants pray in rows parallel to the qiblah wall and thus arrange themselves so they face Mecca. In the qibla wall, usually at its center, is the miḥrāb, a niche or depression indicating the direction of Mecca. Usually the mihrab is not occupied by furniture either. A raised minbar (pulpit) is located to the right side of the mihrab for a khaṭīb (preacher), or some other speaker, to offer a khuṭbah (sermon) during the ritual Friday prayers.

The mihrab serves as the location where the imam or mullah leads the five daily prayers on a regular basis. Left to the mihrab, in the front left corner of the mosque, sometimes there is a kursu (Turkish: kürsü, Bosnian: ćurs/ћурс), a small elevated plateau (rarely with a chair or other type of seat) used for less formal preaching and speeches.

Hypostyle prayer hall of the Qibli Mosque (Al-Aqsa Mosque) in Jerusalem, Palestine

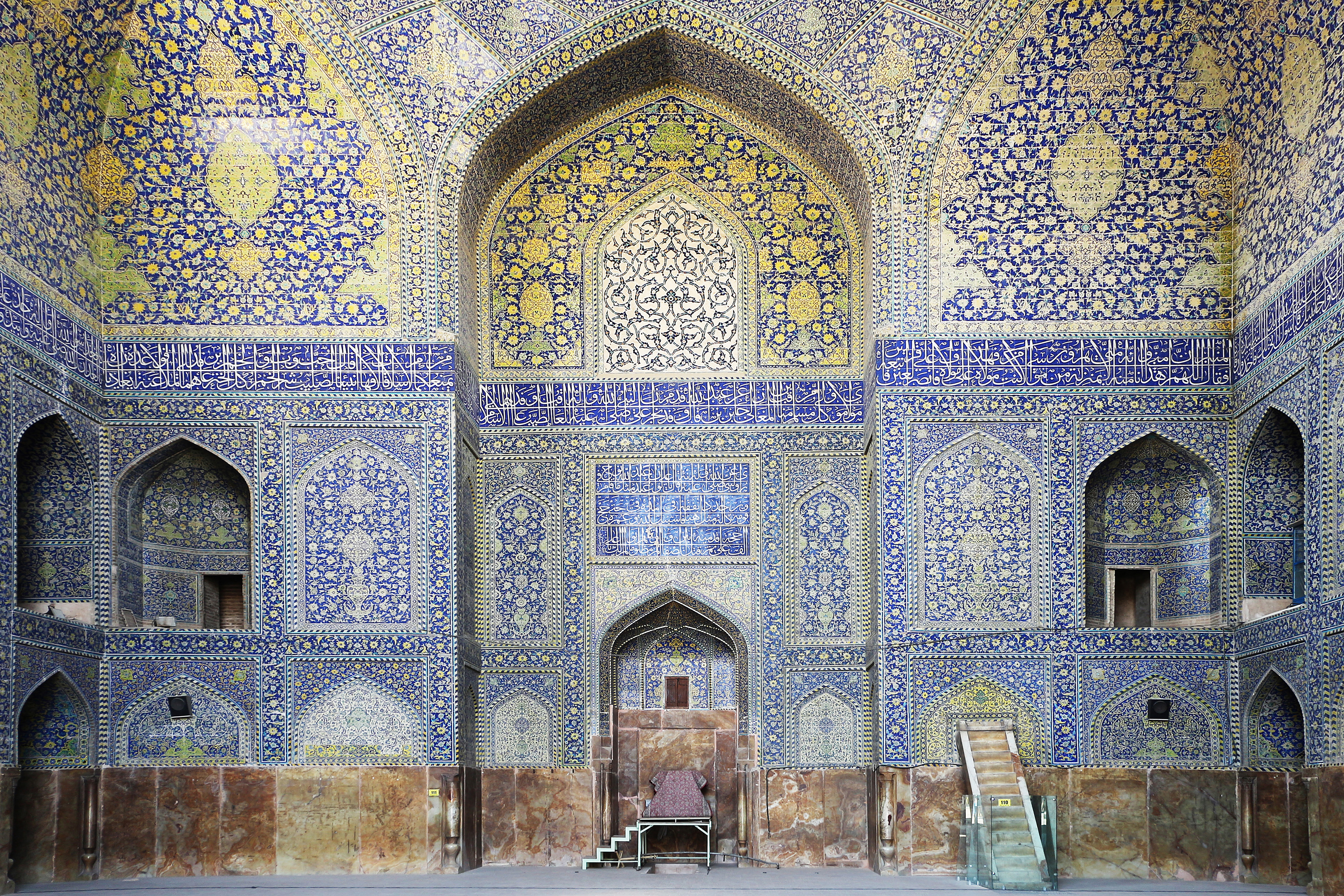
The Persian style prayer hall of the Shah Mosque in Isfahan, Iran

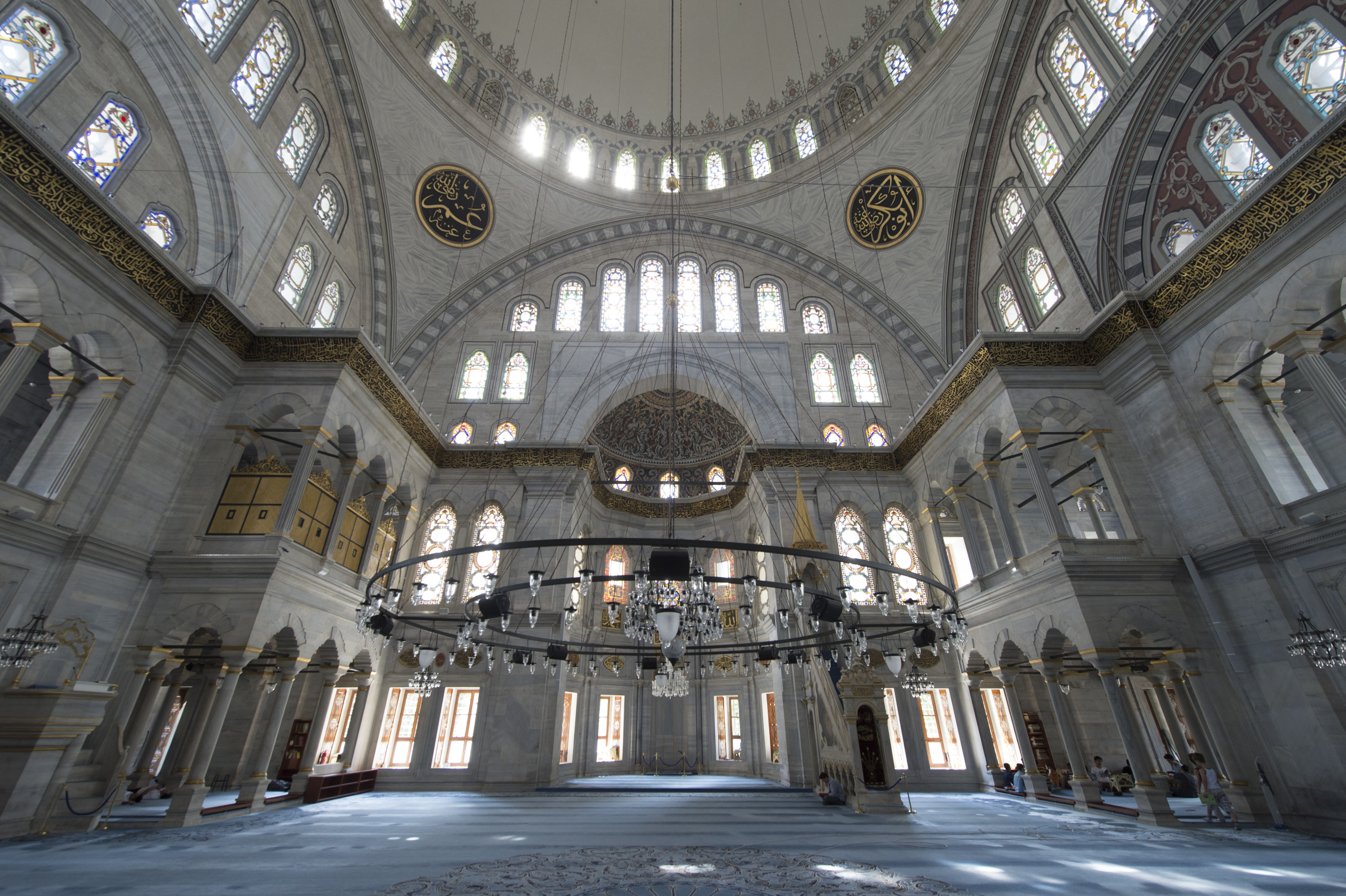
Ottoman Baroque architecture prayer hall of the Nuruosmaniye Mosque in Istanbul, Turkey

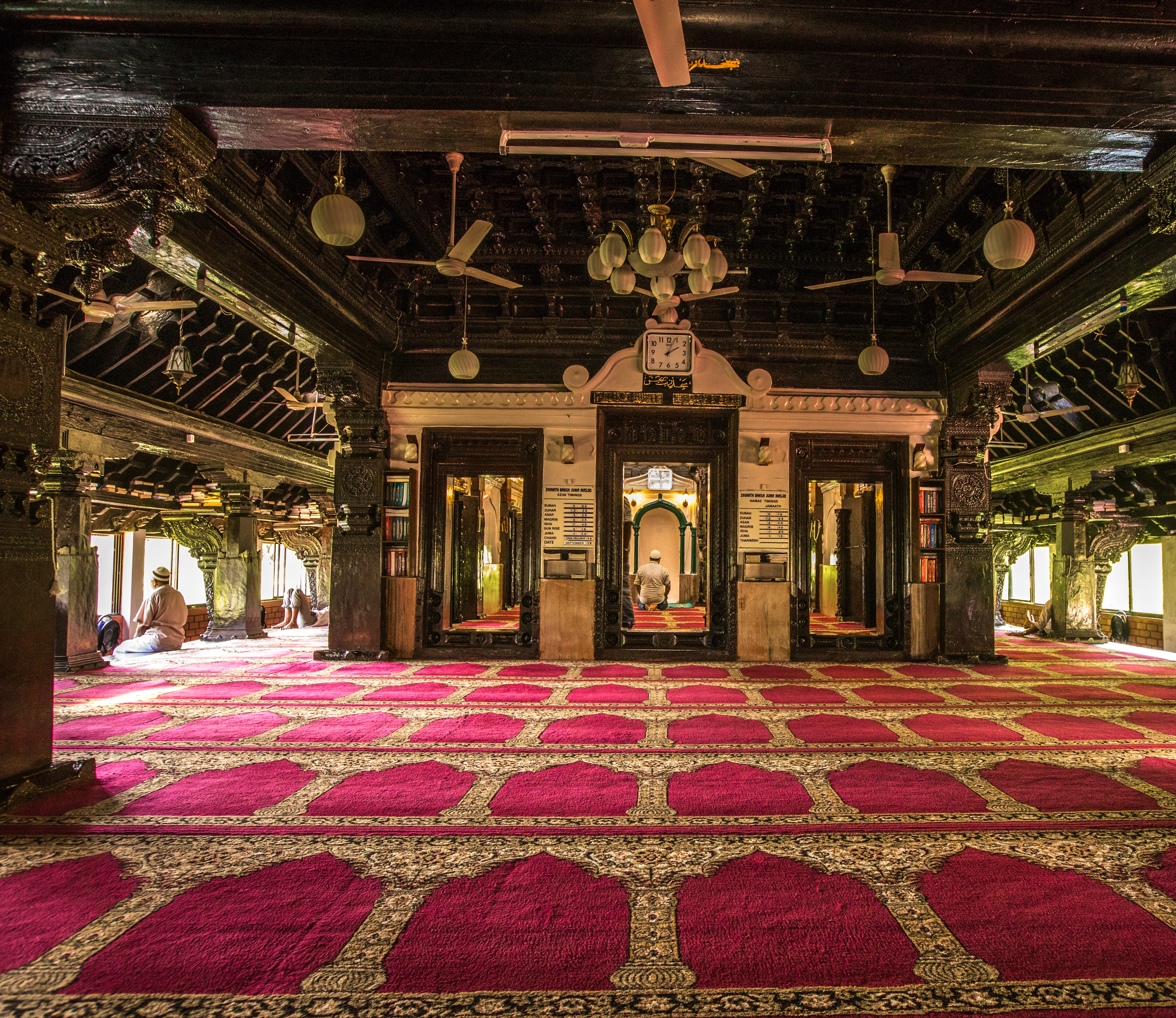
Central prayer hall with Dravidian style of the Masjid Zeenath Baksh, in Dakshina Kannada, India, from the Kingdom of Mysore period

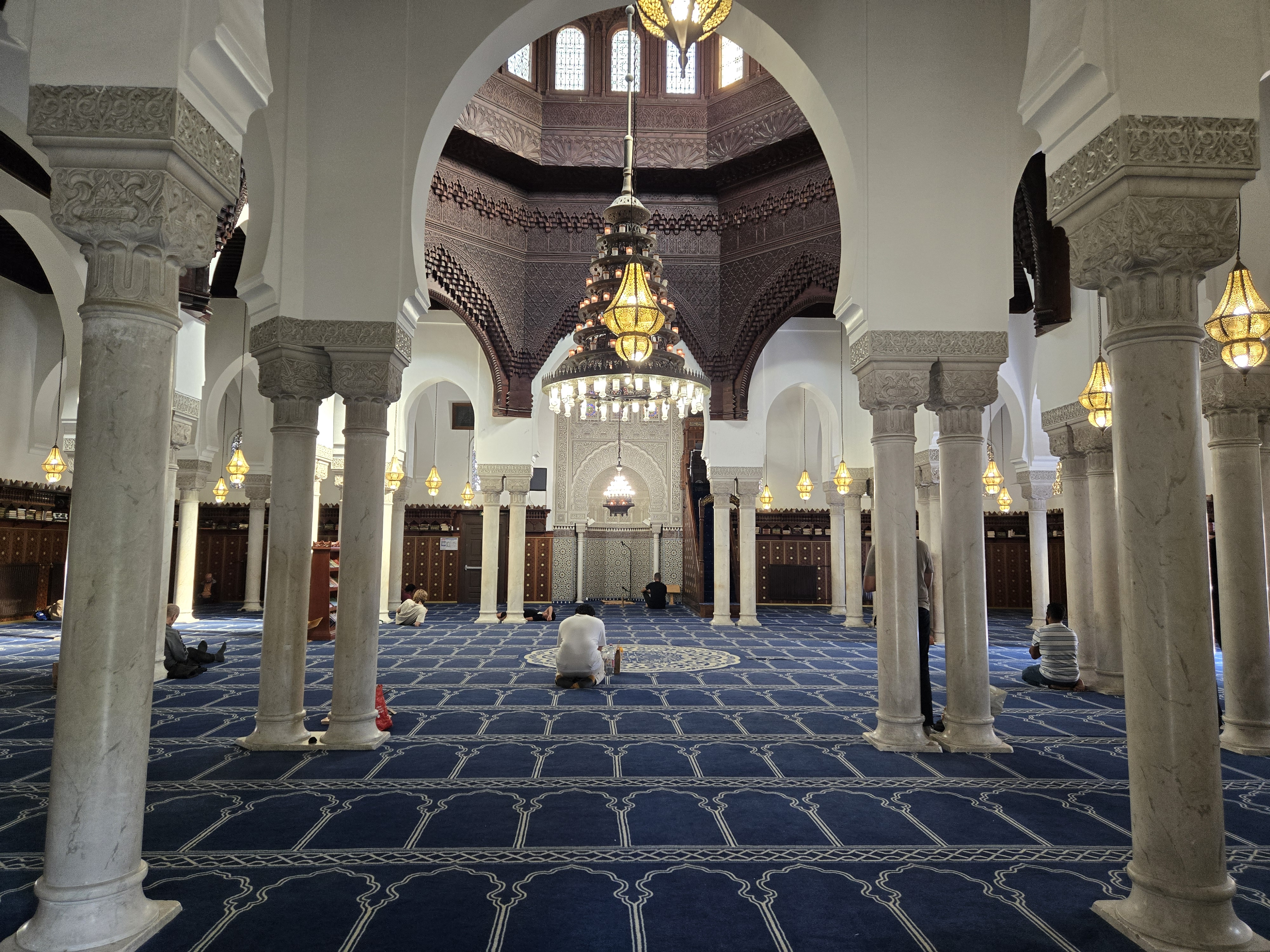
Moorish Revival prayer hall of the Grand Mosque of Paris in France

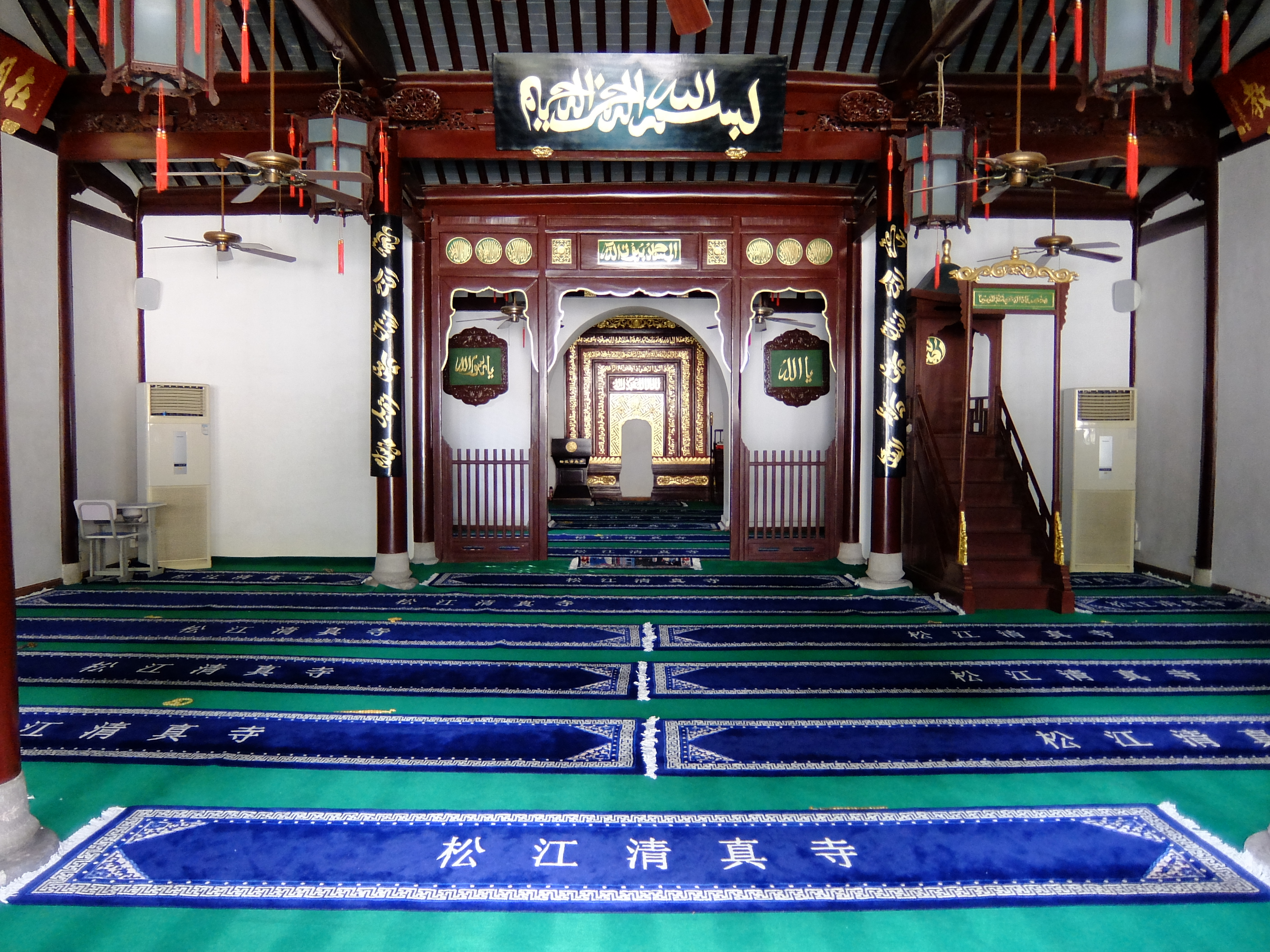
Chinese Islamic-style prayer hall of the Songjiang Mosque in Shanghai, China (established in 1368)

==== Mihrab and minbar ====
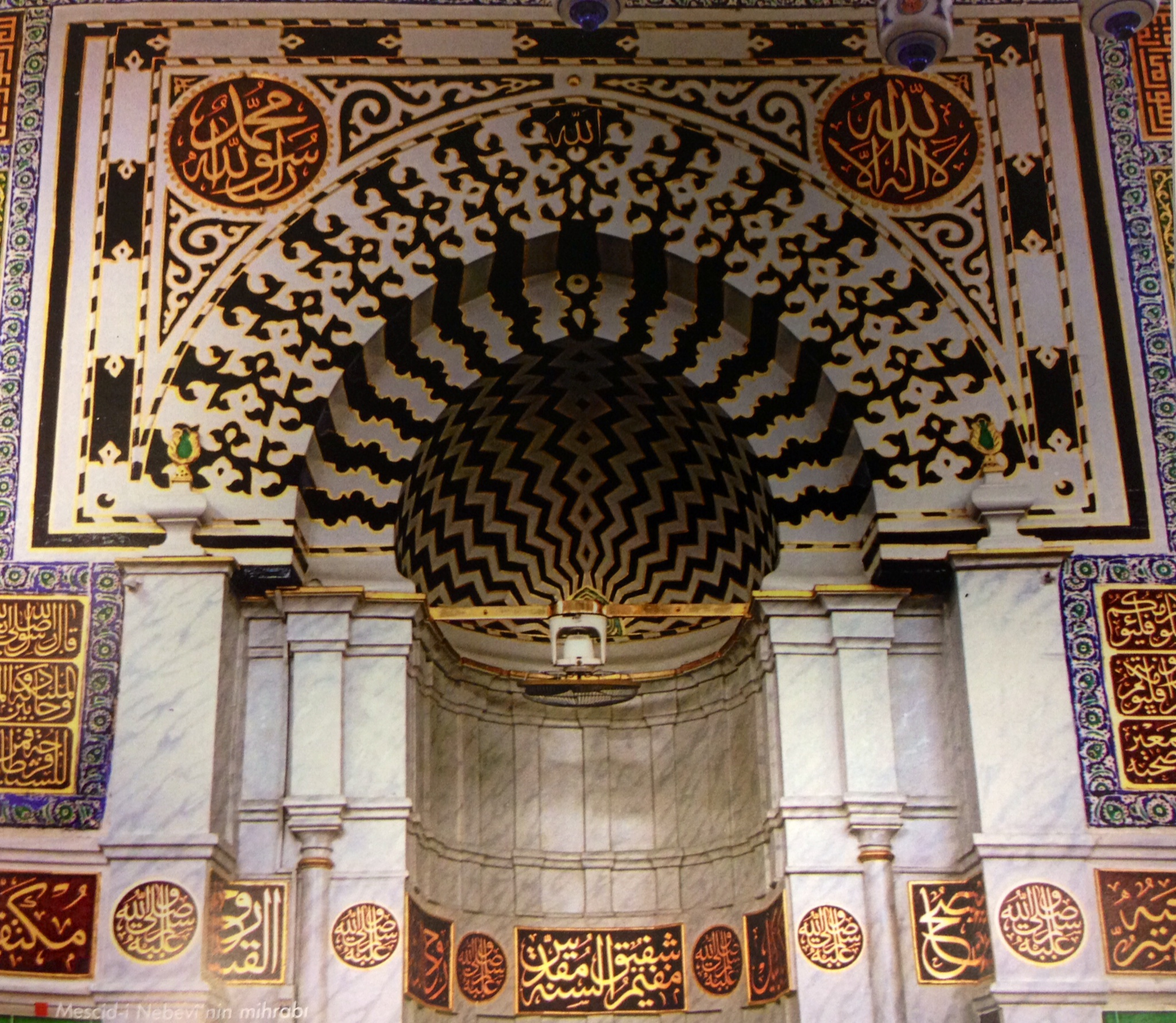
The Uthmani Mihrab, the principal mihrab of the Prophet's Mosque, Medina, Saudi Arabia

A miḥrāb, also spelled as mehrab is a semicircular niche in the wall of a mosque that faces the qiblah (i.e. the "front" of the mosque); the imam stands in this niche and leads prayer. Given that the imam typically stands alone in the frontmost row, this niche's practical effect is to save unused space. The minbar is a pulpit from which the Friday sermon is delivered. While the minbar of Muhammad was a simple chair, later it became larger and attracted artistic attention. Some remained made of wood, albeit exquisitely carved, while others were made of marble and featured friezes.

=== Minarets ===
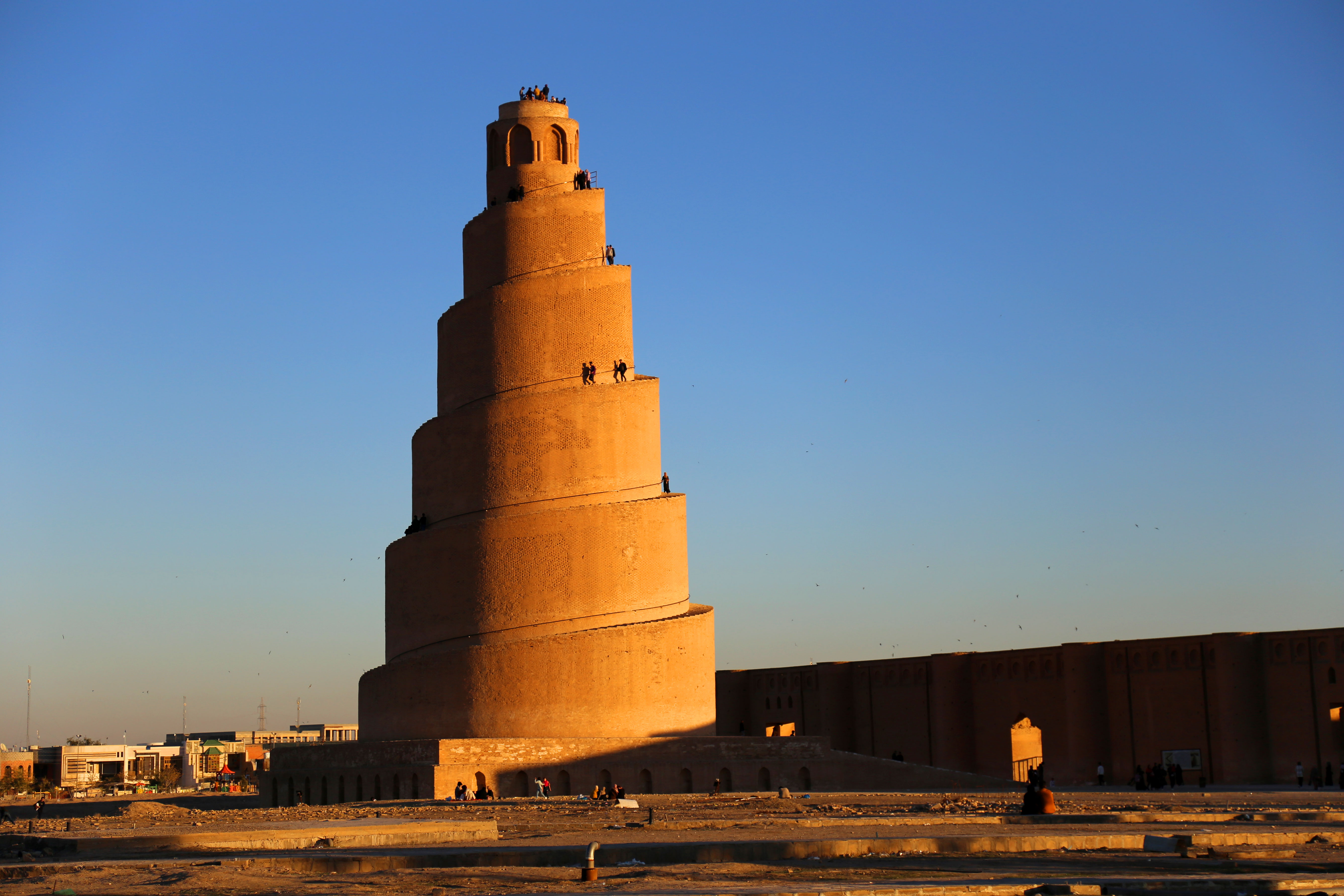
The spiral "Malwiya" minaret of the Abbasid Great Mosque of Samarra, in Iraq (built in 850) was the largest mosque at the time.

A common feature in mosques is the minaret, the tall, slender tower that usually is situated at one of the corners of the mosque structure. The top of the minaret is always the highest point in mosques that have one, and often the highest point in the immediate area.

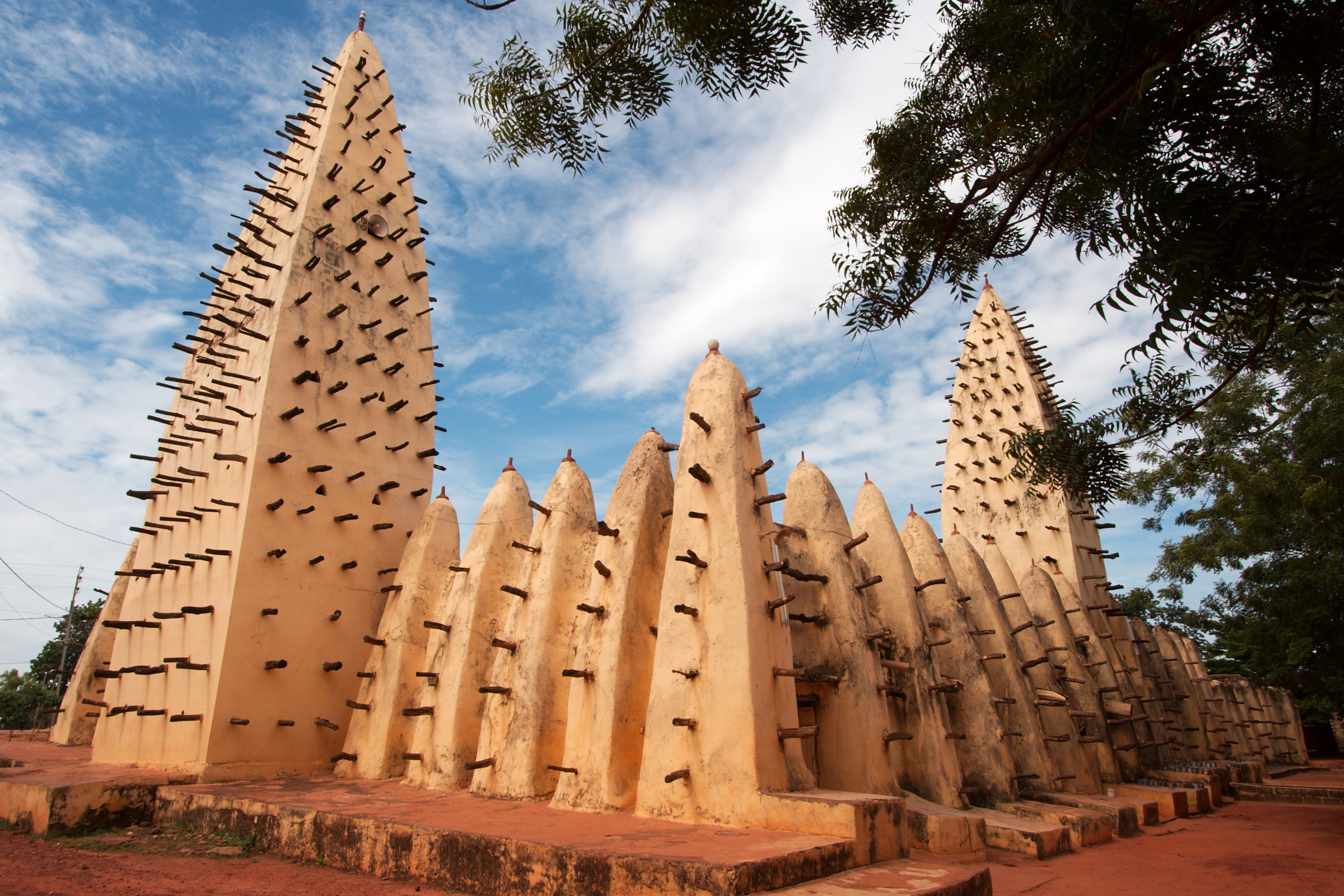
Two minarets made of clay with twenty layers of horizontal protruding wooden sticks from the Great Mosque of Bobo-Dioulasso in Burkina Faso

The origin of the minaret and its initial functions are not clearly known and have long been a topic of scholarly discussion. The earliest mosques lacked minarets, and the call to prayer was often performed from smaller structures or elevated platforms. The early Muslim community of Medina gave the call to prayer from the doorway or the roof of the house of Muhammad, which doubled as a place for prayer. The first confirmed minarets in the form of towers date from the early 9th century under Abbasid rule and they did not become a standard feature of mosques until the 11th century. These first minaret towers were placed in the middle of the wall opposite the qibla wall. Among them, the minaret of the Great Mosque of Kairouan in Tunisia, dating from 836, is well-preserved and is one of the oldest surviving minarets in the world today.

Before the five required daily prayers, a Mu'adhdhin (Arabic: مُـؤَذِّن) calls the worshippers to prayer from the minaret. In many countries like Singapore where Muslims are not the majority, mosques are prohibited from loudly broadcasting the Adhān (Arabic: أَذَان, Call to Prayer), although it is supposed to be said loudly to the surrounding community. The adhan is required before every prayer. Nearly every mosque assigns a muezzin for each prayer to say the adhan as it is a recommended practice or Sunnah (Arabic: سُـنَّـة) of the Islamic prophet Muhammad. At mosques that do not have minarets, the adhan is called instead from inside the mosque or somewhere else on the ground. The Iqâmah (Arabic: إِقَـامَـة), which is similar to the adhan and proclaimed right before the commencement of prayers, is usually not proclaimed from the minaret even if a mosque has one.

=== Courtyard ===
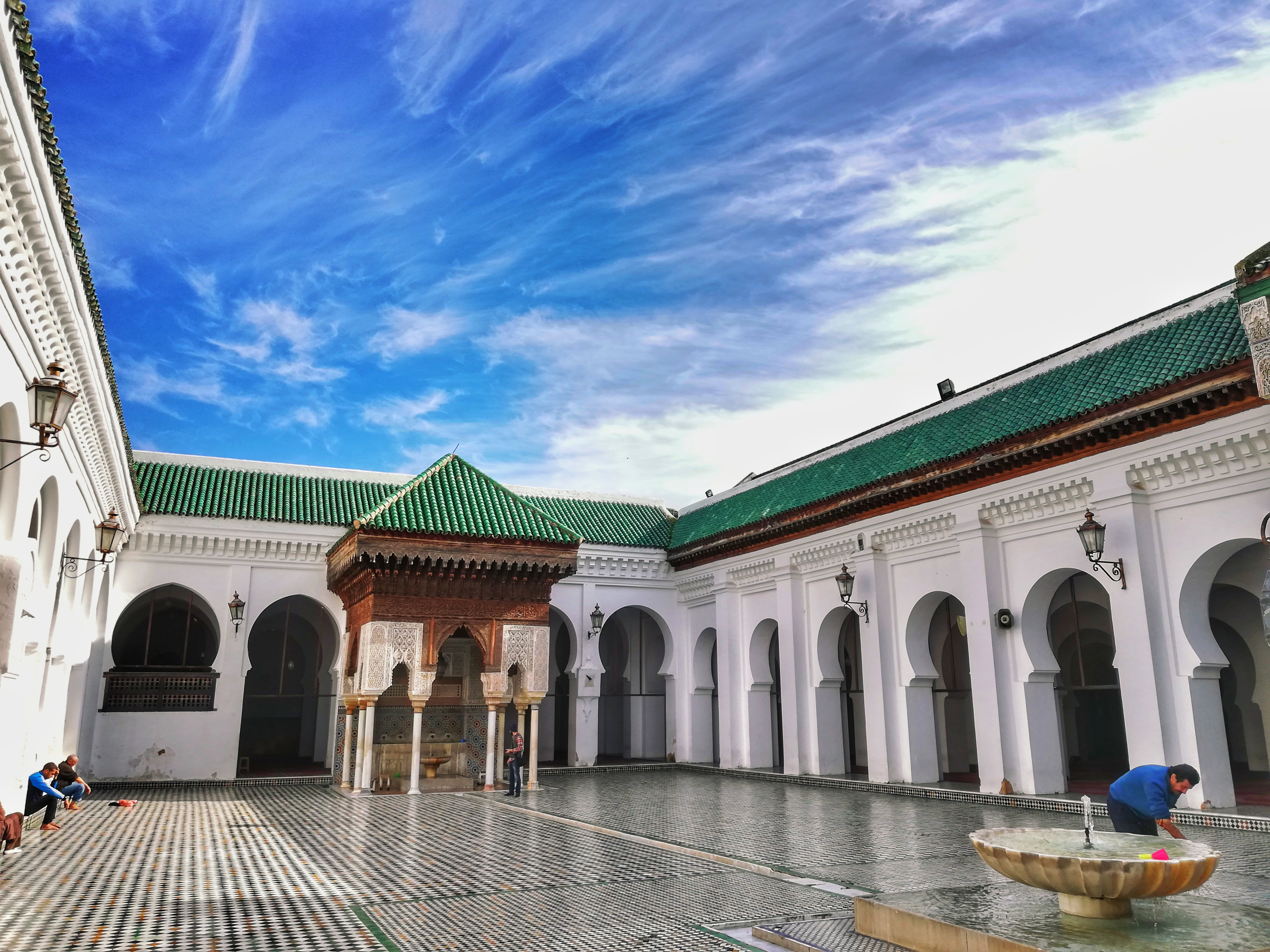
The courtyard (sahn) of the Qarawiyyin Mosque, in Fez, Morocco (established in 859), including the central fountain and one of the Saadian-era pavilions

The courtyard (Sahn) is a common feature of many congressional mosques, it usually includes a fountain or a small water pool for ablution (Wudu).

=== Domes ===
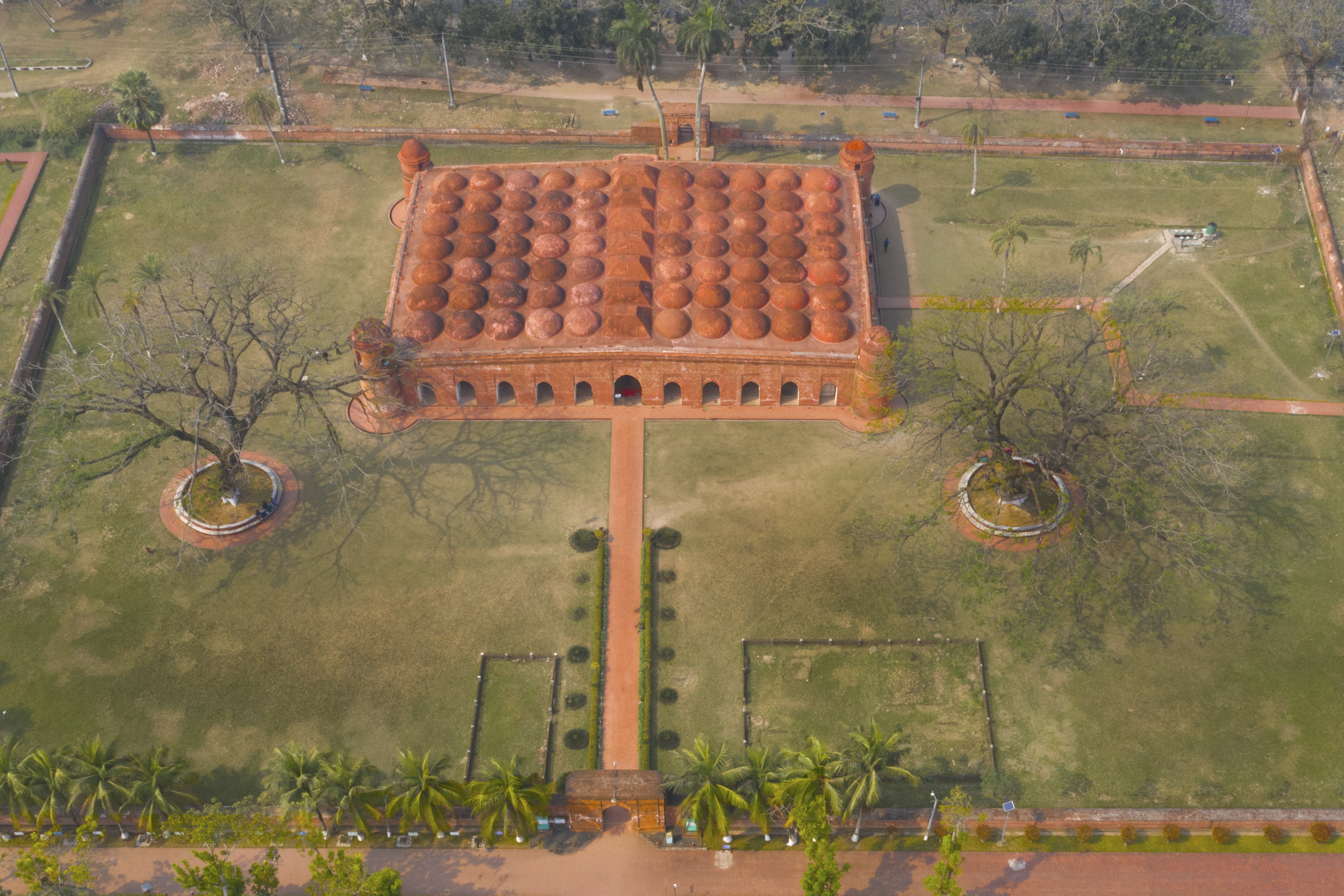
Sixty Dome Mosque in Bagerhat, Bangladesh (built in 1459)

Domes have been a prominent feature in mosque architecture for centuries, evolving both in form and function. Traditionally placed above the main prayer hall, they symbolize the connection between the earthly and divine, often representing the vaults of heaven and sky. Initially, domes were small structures above the mihrab, but over time, they expanded to cover the entire roof of the prayer hall. The shape of the dome evolved from simple hemispherical forms to more complex designs, with the Mughals in India popularizing the onion-shaped dome, which became a hallmark of South Asian and Arabic mosque architecture. The design and function of domes have been influenced by various cultures, including Persian, Byzantine, and Central Asian traditions, each contributing to the techniques and aesthetics used in their construction. Today, domes continue to serve both structural and spiritual purposes, with modern innovations further enhancing their functionality and sustainability.

Structural and functional roles

Domes not only serve as architectural focal points but also enhance mosque acoustics, amplifying the sound of the prayer and the sermon. Structurally, they allow vast interior spaces with minimal internal supports and they make the mosque appear bigger on the inside. Their placement above the prayer hall symbolizes the connection between the earthly and the divine, reinforcing the mosque's spiritual purpose.

Origin of mosque domes

The origin of domes in mosque architecture can be traced back to the early Islamic period, particularly under the Umayyad Caliphate (661–750 CE). The Umayyads, played a key role in incorporating domes into mosque architecture, drawing heavily from pre-Islamic Byzantine and Sassanian traditions. One of the earliest and most significant examples is the Dome of the Rock in Jerusalem, constructed in 691 CE by the Umayyad Caliph Abd al-Malik. This structure was not a mosque but a shrine, yet it set a precedent for the use of domes in Islamic architecture, symbolizing the vault of heaven and the connection between the divine and earthly realms.

Initially, domes in mosques were modest in size and positioned above the mihrab, emphasizing their symbolic function as markers of spiritual focus. As the Islamic empire expanded, architects incorporated techniques from different regions.

Persian and Byzantine influences

Whilst squinches and pendentives were not first used in mosques, they were later incorporated in dome design and were essential in transitioning from square rooms to circular domes. Squinches, which originated in Persian and Roman architecture, fill the corners of a square space to support a dome, while pendentives, a Byzantine innovation, allowed smooth transitions from a square base to a circular dome. These techniques are exemplified by the Dome of Soltaniyeh.

Domes in South Asian mosque architecture

Domes became a defining feature of South Asian mosque architecture during the Delhi Sultanate and reached their peak under the Mughal Empire. Influenced by Persian and Central Asian traditions, the Mughals introduced the iconic onion-shaped domes, seen in landmarks like the Jama Masjid in Delhi and the Badshahi Mosque in Lahore. These domes were not only visually striking but also represented remarkable engineering, using techniques such as iron dowels for strength and timber centering for precision. The Mughal architectural style still influences mosque design today.

Modern innovations

One prime example of modern innovation is the Masjid Raja Haji Fi Sabilillah in Malaysia, which features a Low-E (low emissivity) glass dome. The use of Low-E glass allows for significant energy efficiency by reducing heat gain while still allowing natural light to illuminate the interior space. This technique helps to maintain a comfortable temperature inside the mosque, minimizing reliance on air conditioning, and promoting sustainability. Another example is Zebun Nessa Mosque in Bangladesh with its iconic pink color, built with concrete in order to soften the harsh industrial surroundings.

Mosques with modernist designs

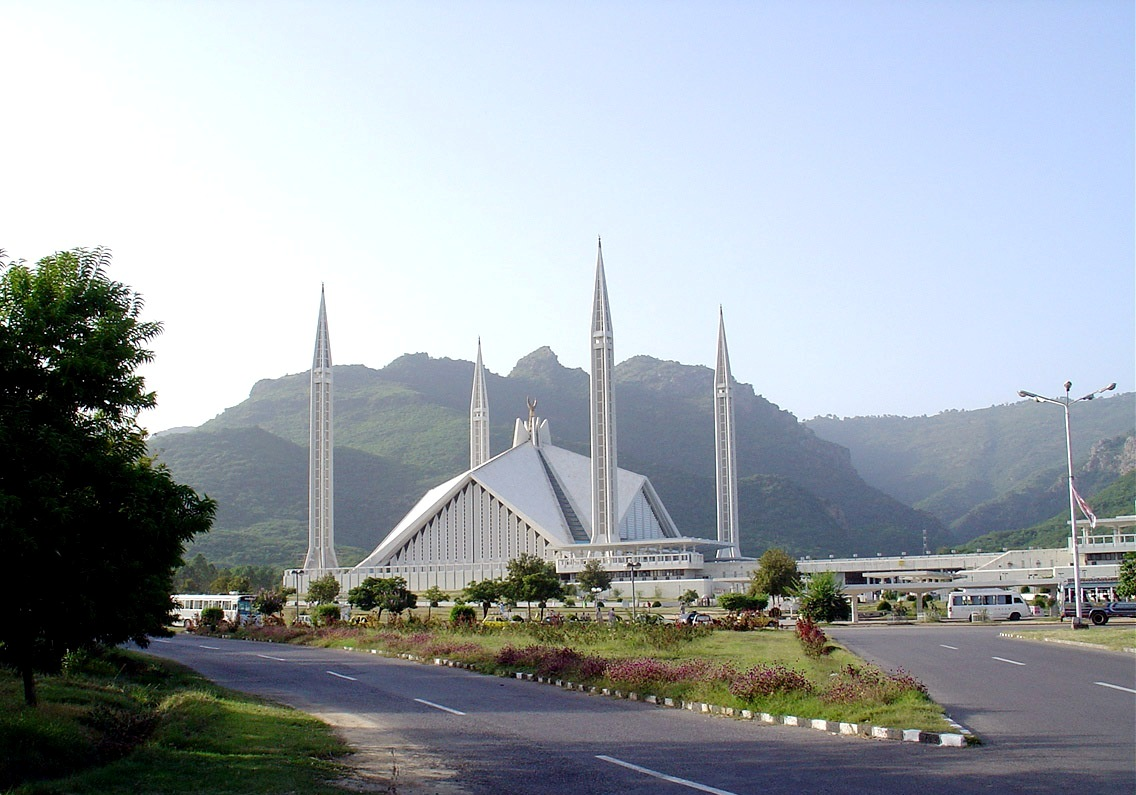
The modern Faisal Mosque in Islamabad, Pakistan

Exterior of Istiqlal Mosque in Jakarta, Indonesia

=== Ablution facilities ===
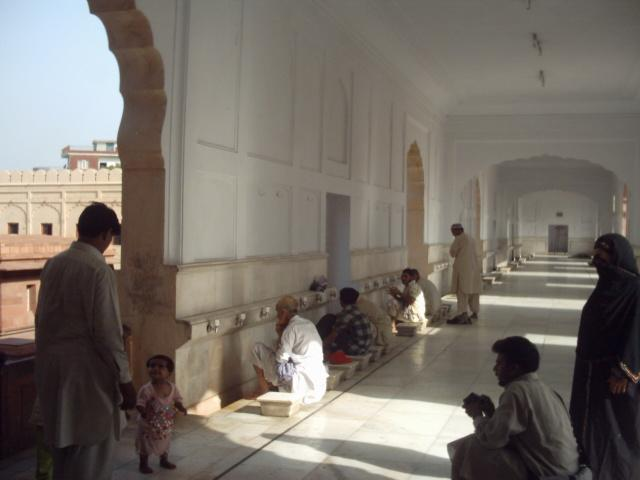
The wudu ("ablution") area, where Muslims wash their hands, forearm, face and feet before they pray. Example from the Badshahi Mosque, Lahore, Pakistan.

As ritual purification precedes all prayers, mosques often have ablution fountains or other facilities for washing in their entryways or courtyards. Worshippers at much smaller mosques often have to use restrooms to perform their ablutions. In traditional mosques, this function is often elaborated into a freestanding building in the center of a courtyard. This desire for cleanliness extends to the prayer halls where shoes are disallowed to be worn anywhere other than the cloakroom. Thus, foyers with shelves to put shoes and racks to hold coats are commonplace among mosques.

=== Contemporary features ===
Modern mosques have a variety of amenities available to their congregants. As mosques are supposed to appeal to the community, they may also have additional facilities, from health clinics and clubs (gyms) to libraries to gymnasiums, to serve the community.

=== Symbols ===
Certain symbols are represented in a mosque's architecture to allude to different aspects of the Islamic religion. One of these feature symbols is the spiral. The "cosmic spiral" found in designs and on minarets is a references to heaven as it has "no beginning and no end". Mosques also often have floral patterns or images of fruit and vegetables. These are allusions to the paradise after death.

=== Inter-religious conversion ===
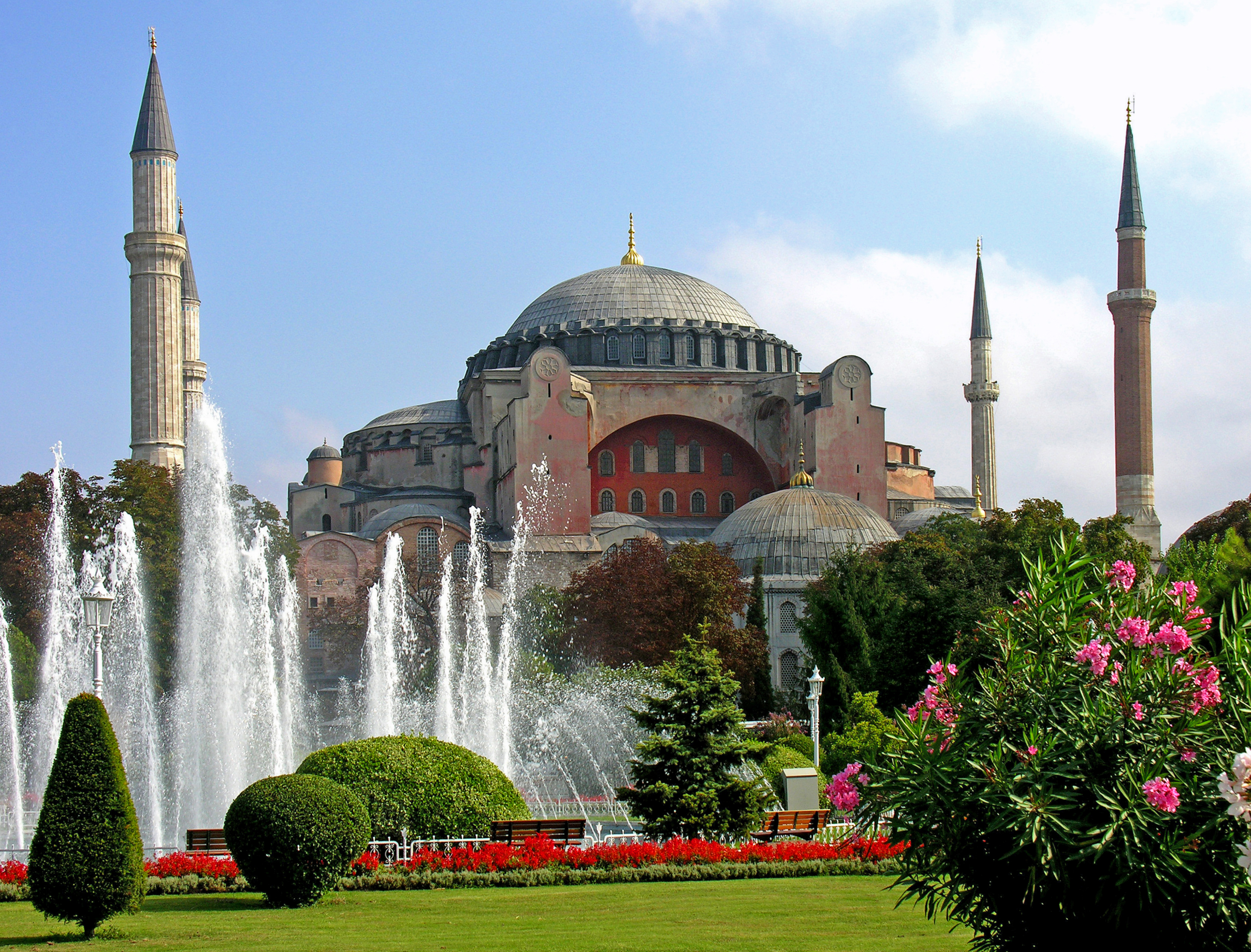
The Hagia Sophia in Istanbul, Turkey, built in 360, was converted into a mosque after the Ottoman conquest of Constantinople in 1453.

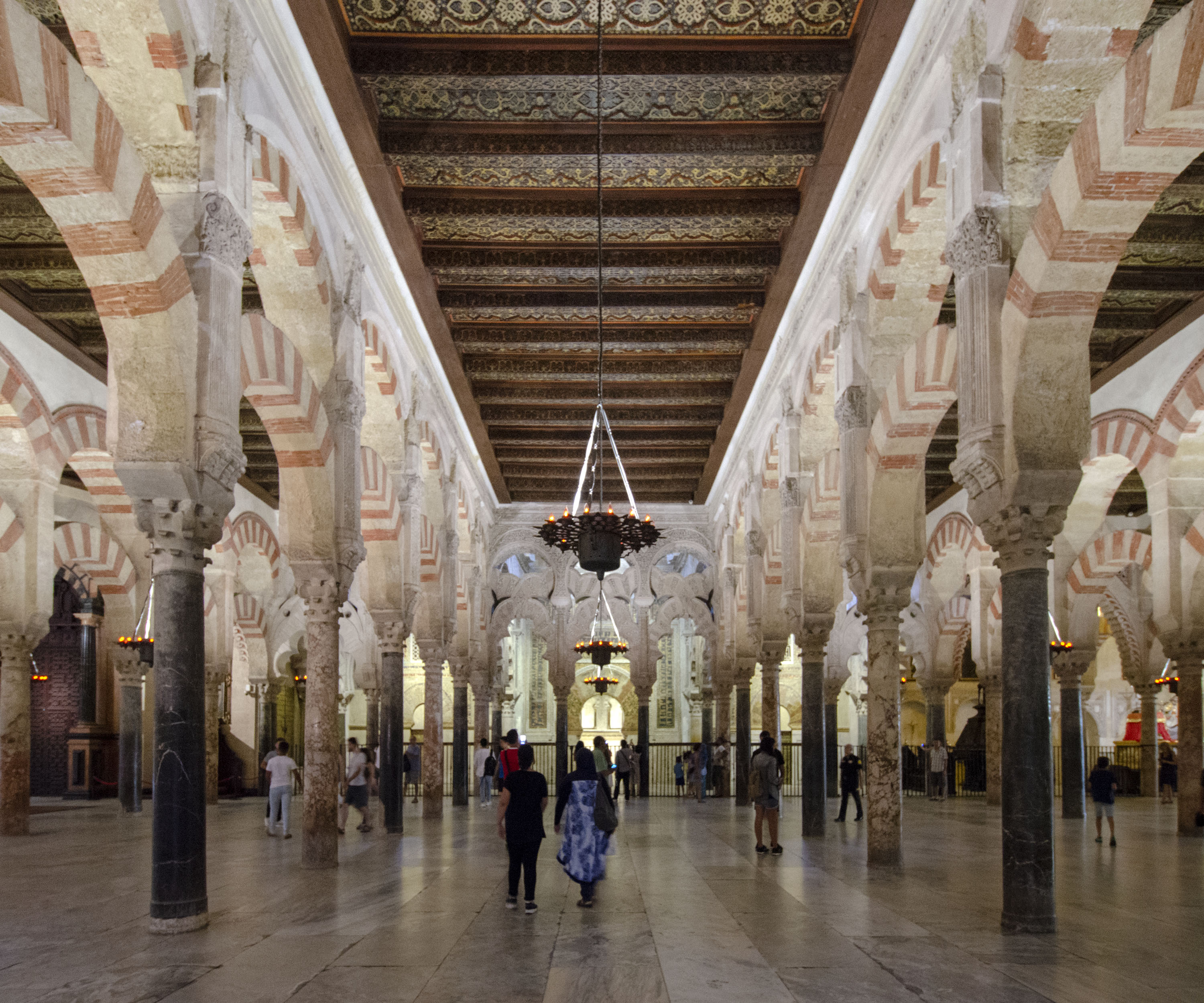
The Mosque–Cathedral of Córdoba in Spain, built in 785, was converted into a cathedral in 1236.

According to early Muslim historians, towns that surrendered without resistance and made treaties with the Muslims were allowed to retain their churches and the towns captured by Muslims had many of their churches converted to mosques. One of the earliest examples of these kinds of conversions was in Damascus, Syria, where in 705 Umayyad caliph Al-Walid I bought the church of St. John from the Christians (which used to be a Roman temple and an Aramean temple prior to that), and had it demolished and rebuilt as a mosque in exchange for building a number of new churches for the Christians in Damascus. Overall, Abd al-Malik ibn Marwan (Al-Waleed's father) is said to have transformed 10 churches in Damascus into mosques.

The process of turning churches into mosques were especially intensive in the villages where most of the inhabitants converted to Islam. The Abbasid caliph al-Ma'mun turned many churches into mosques. Several of the early mosques in the Ottoman Empire were originally churches or cathedrals from the Byzantine Empire, with the Hagia Sophia (one of those converted cathedrals) informing the architecture of mosques from after the Ottoman conquest of Constantinople. In some instances mosques have been established on the places of Jewish or Christian sanctuaries associated with Biblical personalities who were also recognized by Islam.

Mosques have also been converted for use by other religions, notably in southern Spain, following the conquest of the Moors in 1492. The most prominent of them is the Great Mosque of Cordoba, itself constructed on the site of a church demolished during the period of Muslim rule. Outside of the Iberian Peninsula, such instances also occurred in southeastern Europe once regions were no longer under Muslim rule, like the Seven Saints Church, in Sofia, Bulgaria.

== Rules and etiquette ==
=== Prayer leading ===
Appointment of a prayer leader is considered desirable, but not always obligatory. The permanent prayer leader (imam) must be a free honest individual and is authoritative in religious matters. In mosques constructed and maintained by the government, the prayer leader is appointed by the ruler; in private mosques, appointment is made by members of the congregation through majority voting. According to the Hanafi school of Islamic jurisprudence, the individual who built the mosque has a stronger claim to the title of imam, but this view is not shared by the other schools.

Leadership at prayer falls into three categories, depending on the type of prayer: five daily prayers, Friday prayer, or optional prayers. According to the Hanafi and Maliki school of Islamic jurisprudence, appointment of a prayer leader for Friday service is mandatory because otherwise the prayer is invalid. The Shafi'i and Hanbali schools argue that the appointment is not necessary and the prayer is valid as long as it is performed in a congregation. A slave may lead a Friday prayer, but Muslim authorities disagree over whether the job can be done by a minor. An imam appointed to lead Friday prayers may also lead at the five daily prayers; Muslim scholars agree to the leader appointed for five daily services may lead the Friday service as well.

All Muslim authorities hold the consensus opinion that only men may lead prayer for men. Nevertheless, women prayer leaders are allowed to lead prayer in front of all-female congregations.

=== Cleanliness ===
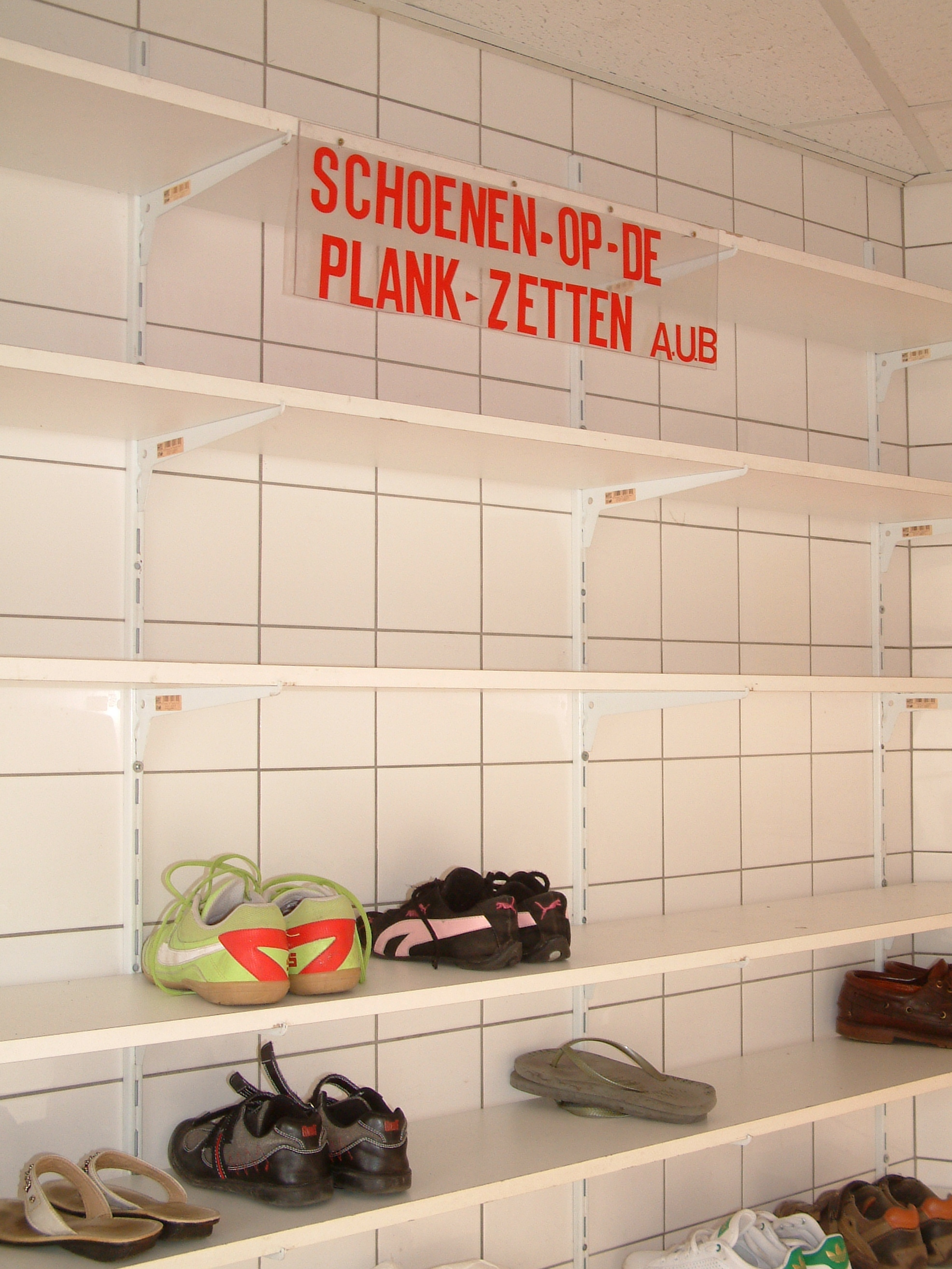
Storage for shoes

All mosques have rules regarding cleanliness, as it is an essential part of the worshippers' experience. Muslims before prayer are required to cleanse themselves in an ablution process known as wudu. Shoes must not be worn inside the carpeted prayer hall. Some mosques will also extend that rule to include other parts of the facility even if those other locations are not devoted to prayer. Congregants and visitors to mosques are supposed to be clean themselves. It is also undesirable to come to the mosque after eating something that smells, such as garlic.

=== Dress ===
Islam requires that its adherents wear clothes that portray modesty. Men are supposed to come to the mosque wearing loose and clean clothes that do not reveal the shape of the body. Likewise, it is recommended that women at a mosque wear loose clothing that covers to the wrists and ankles, and cover their heads with a hijāb (Arabic: حِجاب), or other covering. Many Muslims, regardless of their ethnic background, wear Middle Eastern clothing associated with Arabic Islam to special occasions and prayers at mosques.

=== Concentration ===
As mosques are places of worship, those within the mosque are required to remain respectful to those in prayer. Loud talking within the mosque, as well as discussion of topics deemed disrespectful, is forbidden in areas where people are praying. In addition, it is disrespectful to walk in front of or otherwise disturb Muslims in prayer. The walls within the mosque have few items, except for possibly Islamic calligraphy, so Muslims in prayer are not distracted. Muslims are also discouraged from wearing clothing with distracting images and symbols so as not to divert the attention of those standing behind them during prayer. In many mosques, even the carpeted prayer area has no designs, its plainness helping worshippers to focus.

=== Gender separation ===
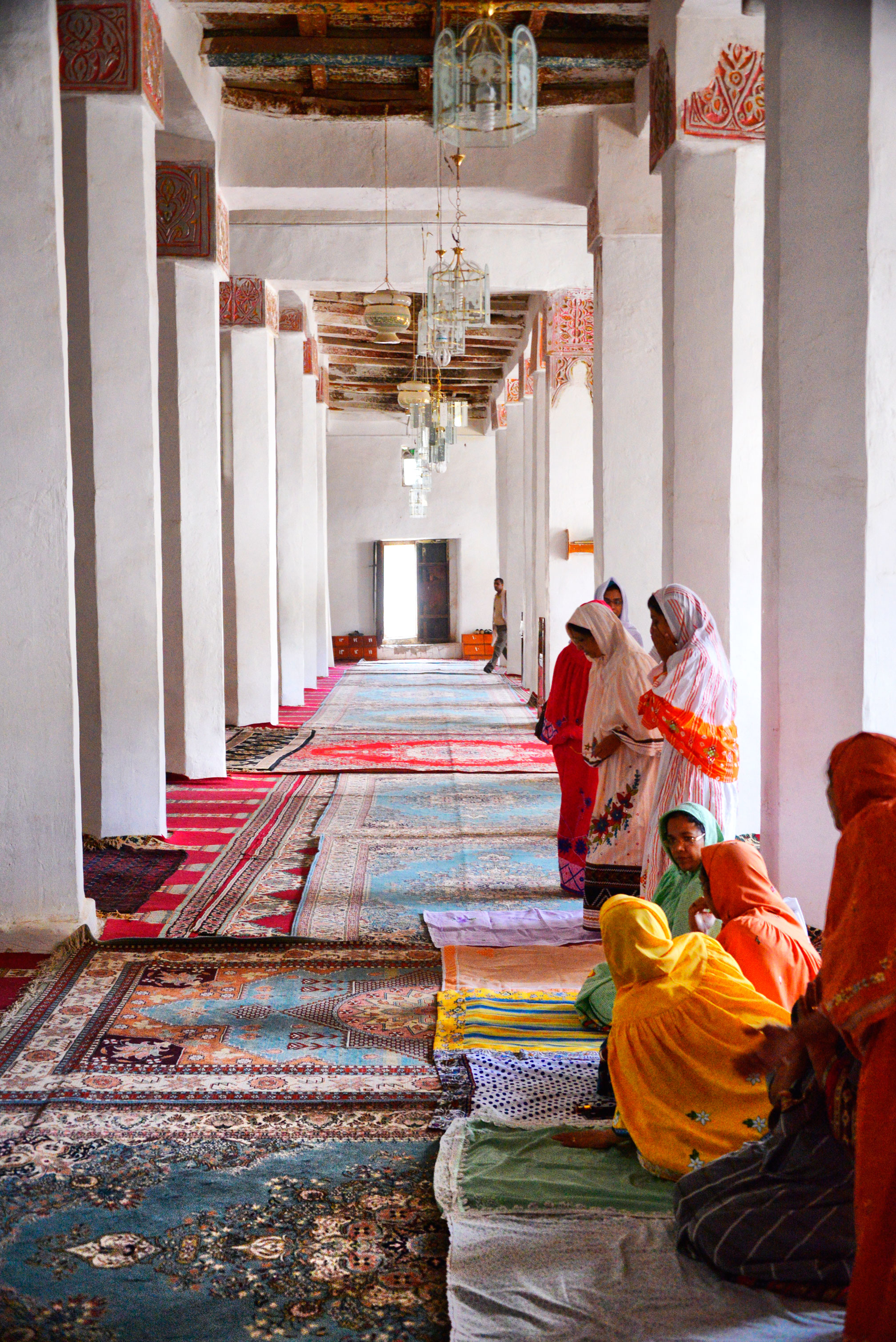
Women in the historical Queen Arwa Mosque in Jibla, Yemen

There is nothing written in the Qur'an about the issue of space in mosques and gender separation. Traditional rules have segregated women and men. By traditional rules, women are most often told to occupy the rows behind the men. In part, this was a practical matter as the traditional posture for prayer – kneeling on the floor, head to the ground – made mixed-gender prayer uncomfortably revealing for many women and distracting for some men. Traditionalists try to argue that Muhammad preferred women to pray at home rather than at a mosque, and they cite a ḥadīth in which Muhammad supposedly said: "The best mosques for women are the inner parts of their houses," although women were active participants in the mosque started by Muhammad. Muhammad told Muslims not to forbid women from entering mosques. They are allowed to go in. The second Sunni caliph 'Umar at one time prohibited women from attending mosques especially at night because he feared they might be sexually harassed or assaulted by men, so he required them to pray at home. Sometimes a special part of the mosque was railed off for women; for example, the governor of Mecca in 870 had ropes tied between the columns to make a separate place for women.

Many mosques today will put the women behind a barrier or partition or in another room. Mosques in South and Southeast Asia put men and women in separate rooms, as the divisions were built into them centuries ago. In nearly two-thirds of American mosques, women pray behind partitions or in separate areas, not in the main prayer hall; some mosques do not admit women at all due to the lack of space and the fact that some prayers, such as the Friday Jumuʻah, are mandatory for men but optional for women. Although there are sections exclusively for women and children, the Grand Mosque in Mecca is desegregated. In a number of mosques the women section is located above the main prayer hall, elevated in the background as stairs-separated gallery or plateau (surface-shortened to the back relative to the bottom main part). It usually has a perforated fence at the front, through which the imam or mullah and the other male worshippers in the main hall can be partially seen.

=== Non-Muslim inclusion ===
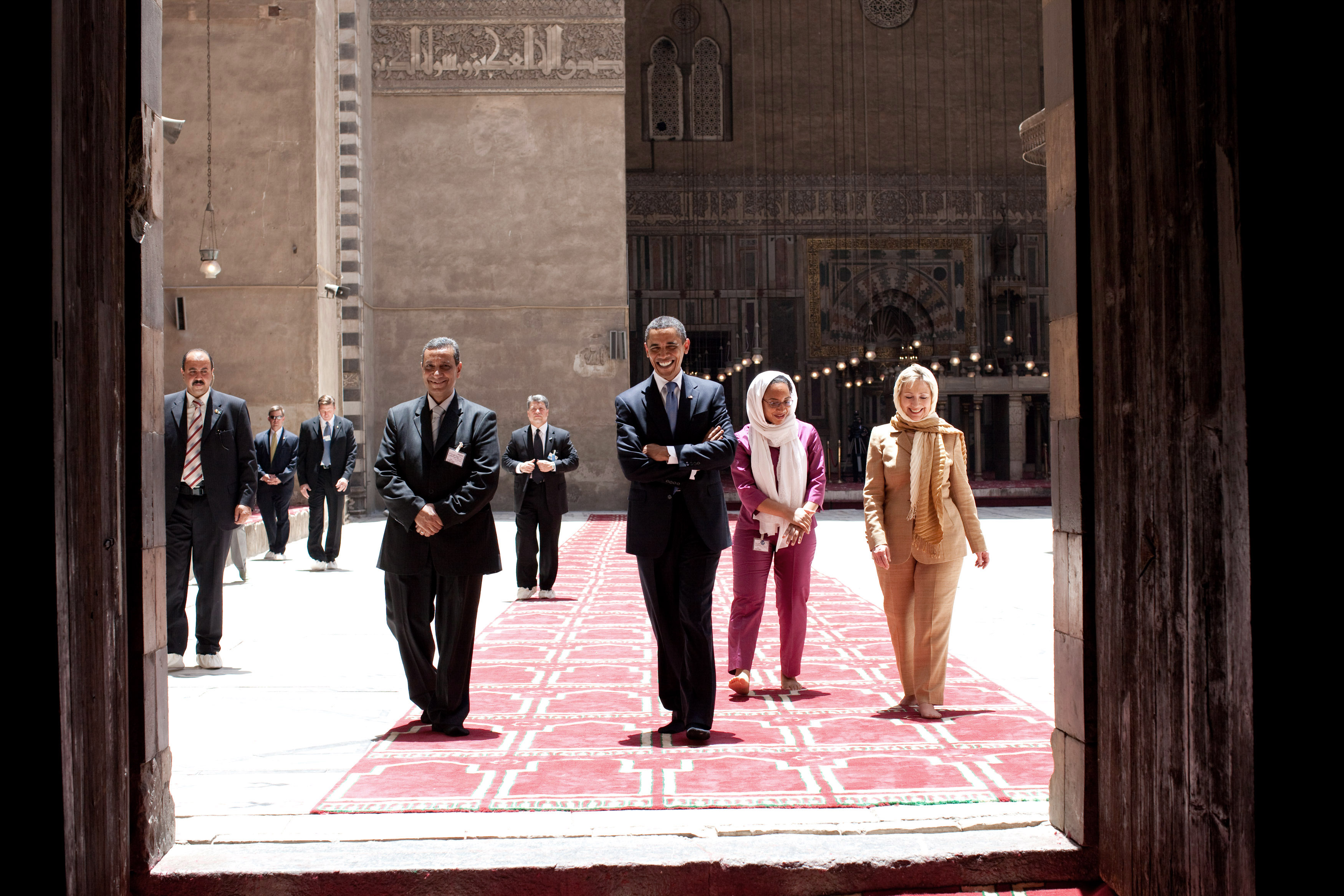
President Obama and Secretary Clinton visiting the Mosque-Madrasa of Sultan Hasan in Cairo

Under most interpretations of sharia, non-Muslims are permitted to enter mosques provided that they respect the place and the people inside it. A dissenting opinion and minority view is presented by followers of the Maliki school of Islamic jurisprudence, who argue that non-Muslims may not be allowed into mosques under any circumstances.

The Quran addresses the subject of non-Muslims, and particularly polytheists, in mosques in two verses in its ninth chapter, Sura At-Tawba. The seventeenth verse of the chapter prohibits those who join gods with Allah (polytheists) from maintaining mosques:

It is not for the polytheists to maintain the mosques of Allah while they openly profess disbelief. Their deeds are void, and they will be in the Fire forever.

The twenty-eighth verse of the same chapter is more specific as it only considers polytheists in the Masjid al-Haram in Mecca:

O believers! Indeed, the polytheists are "spiritually" impure, so they should not approach the Sacred Mosque after this year. If you fear poverty, Allah will enrich you out of His bounty, if He wills. Surely, Allah is All-Knowing, All-Wise.

According to Ahmad ibn Hanbal, these verses were followed to the letter at the times of Muhammad, when Jews and Christians, considered monotheists, were still allowed to Al-Masjid Al-Haram. The Umayyad caliph Umar II later forbade non-Muslims from entering mosques, and his ruling remains in practice in present-day Saudi Arabia. Today, the decision on whether non-Muslims should be allowed to enter mosques varies. With few exceptions, mosques in the Arabian Peninsula as well as Morocco do not allow entry to non-Muslims. For example, the Hassan II Mosque in Casablanca is one of only two mosques in Morocco currently open to non-Muslims.

There are many other mosques in the West and Islamic world which non-Muslims are welcome to enter. Most mosques in the United States, for example, report receiving non-Muslim visitors every month. Many mosques throughout the United States welcome non-Muslims as a sign of openness to the rest of the community as well as to encourage conversions to Islam.

In modern-day Saudi Arabia, the Grand Mosque and all of Mecca are open only to Muslims. Likewise, Al-Masjid Al-Nabawi and the city of Medina that surrounds it are also off-limits to those who do not practice Islam. For mosques in other areas, it has most commonly been taken that non-Muslims may only enter mosques if granted permission to do so by Muslims, and if they have a legitimate reason. All entrants regardless of religious affiliation are expected to respect the rules and decorum for mosques.

In modern Turkey, non-Muslim tourists are allowed to enter any mosque, but there are some strict rules. Visiting a mosque is allowed only between prayers; visitors are required to wear long trousers and not to wear shoes, women must cover their heads; visitors are not allowed to interrupt praying Muslims, especially by taking photos of them; no loud talk is allowed; and no references to other religions are allowed (no crosses on necklaces, no cross gestures, etc.) Similar rules apply to mosques in Malaysia, where larger mosques that are also tourist attractions (such as the Masjid Negara) provide robes and headscarves for visitors who are deemed inappropriately attired.

In certain times and places, non-Muslims were expected to behave a certain way in the vicinity of a mosque: in some Moroccan cities, Jews were required to remove their shoes when passing by a mosque; in 18th-century Egypt, Jews and Christians had to dismount before several mosques in veneration of their sanctity.

The association of the mosque with education remained one of its main characteristics throughout history, and the school became an indispensable appendage to the mosque. From the earliest days of Islam, the mosque was the center of the Muslim community, a place for prayer, meditation, religious instruction, political discussion, and a school. Anywhere Islam took hold, mosques were established, and basic religious and educational instruction began.

== Role in contemporary society ==
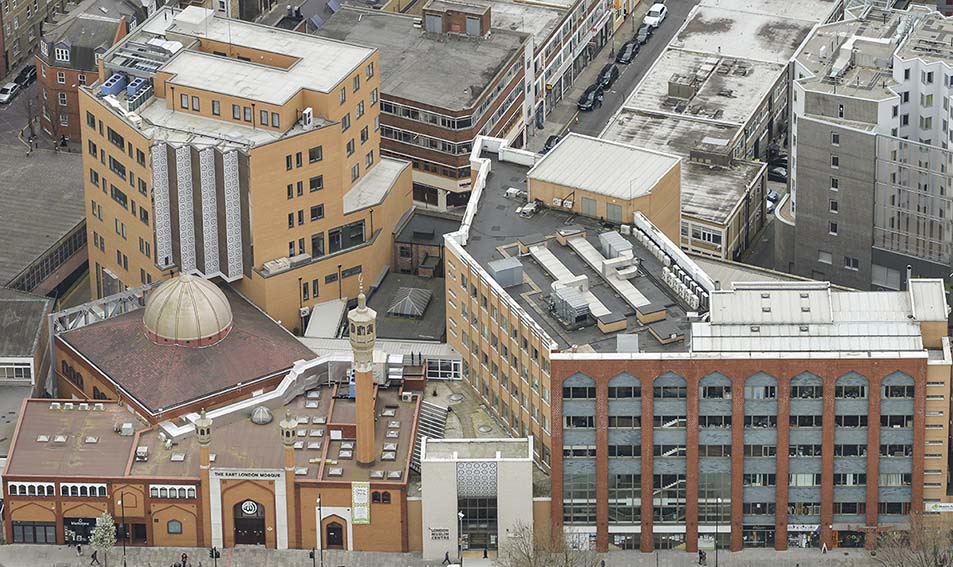
The East London Mosque was one of the first in Britain to be allowed to use loudspeakers to broadcast the adhan.

=== Political mobilization ===
The late 20th century saw an increase in the number of mosques that deliver politics and economy related lectures. While some governments in the Muslim world attempted to limit the content of Friday sermons to strictly religious topics, there are also independent preachers who deliver khutbas that address social and political issues, often in emotionally charged terms. Common themes include social inequalities, necessity of jihad in the face of injustice, and the universal struggle between good and evil. In Islamic countries like Bangladesh, Pakistan, Iran, and Saudi Arabia, political subjects are preached by some imams at some of the Friday congregations. Mosques often serve as meeting points for political opposition in times of crisis.

Countries with a minority Muslim population are more likely than Muslim-majority countries of the Greater Middle East to use mosques as a way to promote civic participation. Studies of US Muslims have consistently shown a positive correlation between mosque attendance and political involvement. Some of the research connects civic engagement specifically with mosque attendance for social and religious activities other than prayer. American mosques host voter registration and civic participation drives that promote involving Muslims, who are often first- or second-generation immigrants, in the political process. As a result of these efforts as well as attempts at mosques to keep Muslims informed about the issues facing the Muslim community, regular mosque attendants are more likely to participate in protests, sign petitions, and otherwise be involved in politics. Research on Muslim civic engagement in other Western countries "is less conclusive but seems to indicate similar trends".

=== Frequency of attendance ===
The frequency by which Muslims attend mosque services vary greatly around the world. In some countries, weekly attendance at religious services is common among Muslims while in others, attendance is rare. A study of American Muslims did not find differences in mosque attendance by gender or age.

Percentage of Muslims who attend mosque at least once a week, 2009–2012
Countries	Percentage
Ghana	99%
Liberia	94%
Ethiopia	93%
Uganda	93%
Guinea-Bissau	92%
Mozambique	92%
Kenya	91%
Niger	88%
Nigeria	87%
Democratic Republic of the Congo	85%
Cameroon	84%
Djibouti	84%
Tanzania	82%
Chad	81%
Mali	79%
Indonesia	72%
Jordan	65%
Senegal	65%
Afghanistan	61%
Egypt	61%
Pakistan	59%
Malaysia	57%
United Kingdom (Note: Survey was conducted in 2016, not 2009–2012.)	56%
Palestine	55%
Iraq	54%
Spain	54%
Bangladesh	53%
Thailand (Note: Survey was only conducted in the southern five provinces.)	52%
Yemen (Note: Survey was conducted in 2013, not 2009–2012. Sample was taken from entire population of Yemen, which is approximately 99% Muslim.)	51%
Israel (Note: Survey was conducted in 2015, not 2009–2012.)	49%
Italy	49%
Canada (Note: Survey was conducted in 2016, not 2009–2012.)	48%
Algeria (Note: Survey was conducted in 2008, not 2009–2012.)	47%
Tunisia	47%
United States of America	47%
Turkey	44%
Australia (Note: Survey was conducted in 2015, not 2009–2012.)	40%
Morocco	40%
Germany (Note: Survey was conducted in 2008, not 2009–2012.)	35%
Lebanon	35%
Libya (Note: Survey was conducted in 2013, not 2009–2012. Sample was taken from entire population of Libya, which is approximately 97% Muslim.)	35%
Bosnia and Herzegovina	30%
France (Note: Survey was conducted in 2016, not 2009–2012.)	30%
Tajikistan	30%
Belgium	28%
Iran (Note: Survey was conducted in 2008, not 2009–2012.)	27%
Saudi Arabia (Note: Survey was conducted in 2008, not 2009–2012.)	27%
Denmark	25%
Netherlands	24%
Kyrgyzstan	23%
Kosovo	22%
Bulgaria (Note: Survey was conducted in 2017, not 2009–2012.)	21%
(Russia) Russian Federation	19%
(Georgia (country)) Georgia (Note: Survey was conducted in 2017, not 2009–2012.)	14%
Kazakhstan	10%
Uzbekistan	9%
Albania	5%
Azerbaijan	1%

=== Political controversy ===
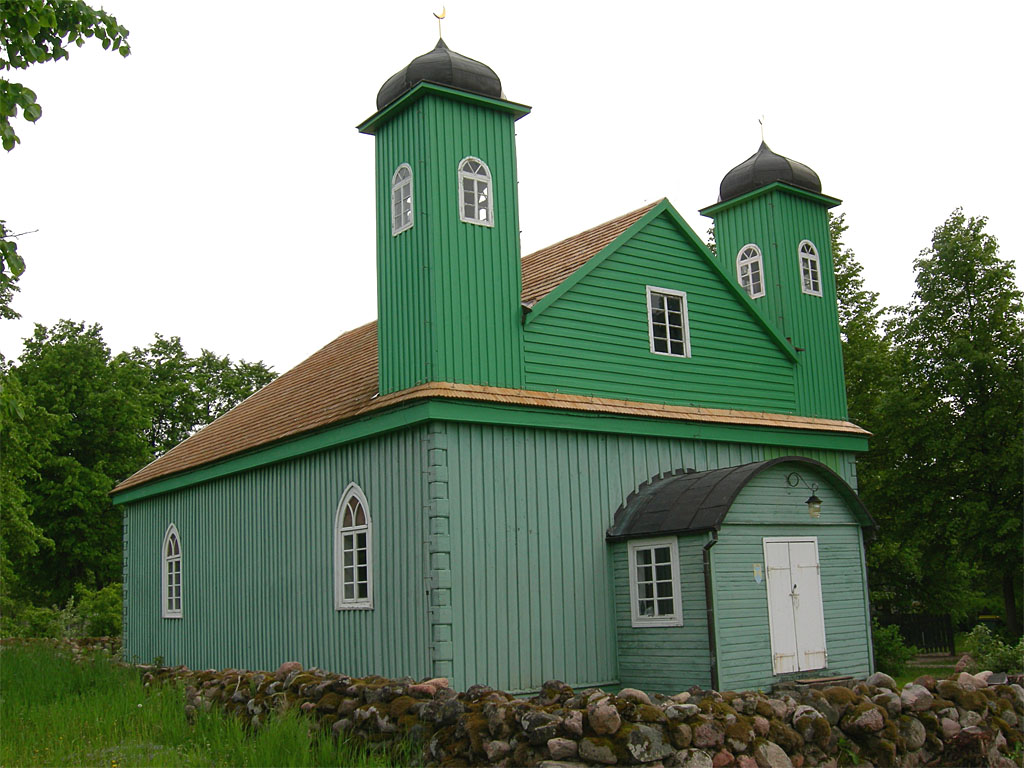
Historic wooden Kruszyniany Mosque, used by the Polish Tatar community, and targeted by an Islamophobic attack in 2014

In the western world, and in the United States in particular, anti-Muslim sentiment and targeted domestic policy has created challenges for mosques and those looking to build them. There has been government and police surveillance of mosques in the US and local attempts to ban mosques and block constructions,

Since 2017, Chinese authorities have destroyed or damaged two-thirds of the mosques in China's Xinjiang province. Ningxia officials were notified on 3 August 2018 that the Weizhou Grand Mosque would be forcibly demolished because it had not received the proper permits before construction. Officials in the town said that the mosque had not been given proper building permits, because it is built in a Middle Eastern style and includes numerous domes and minarets. The residents of Weizhou alarmed each other through social media and finally stopped the mosque destruction by public demonstrations.

=== Role in violent conflicts ===
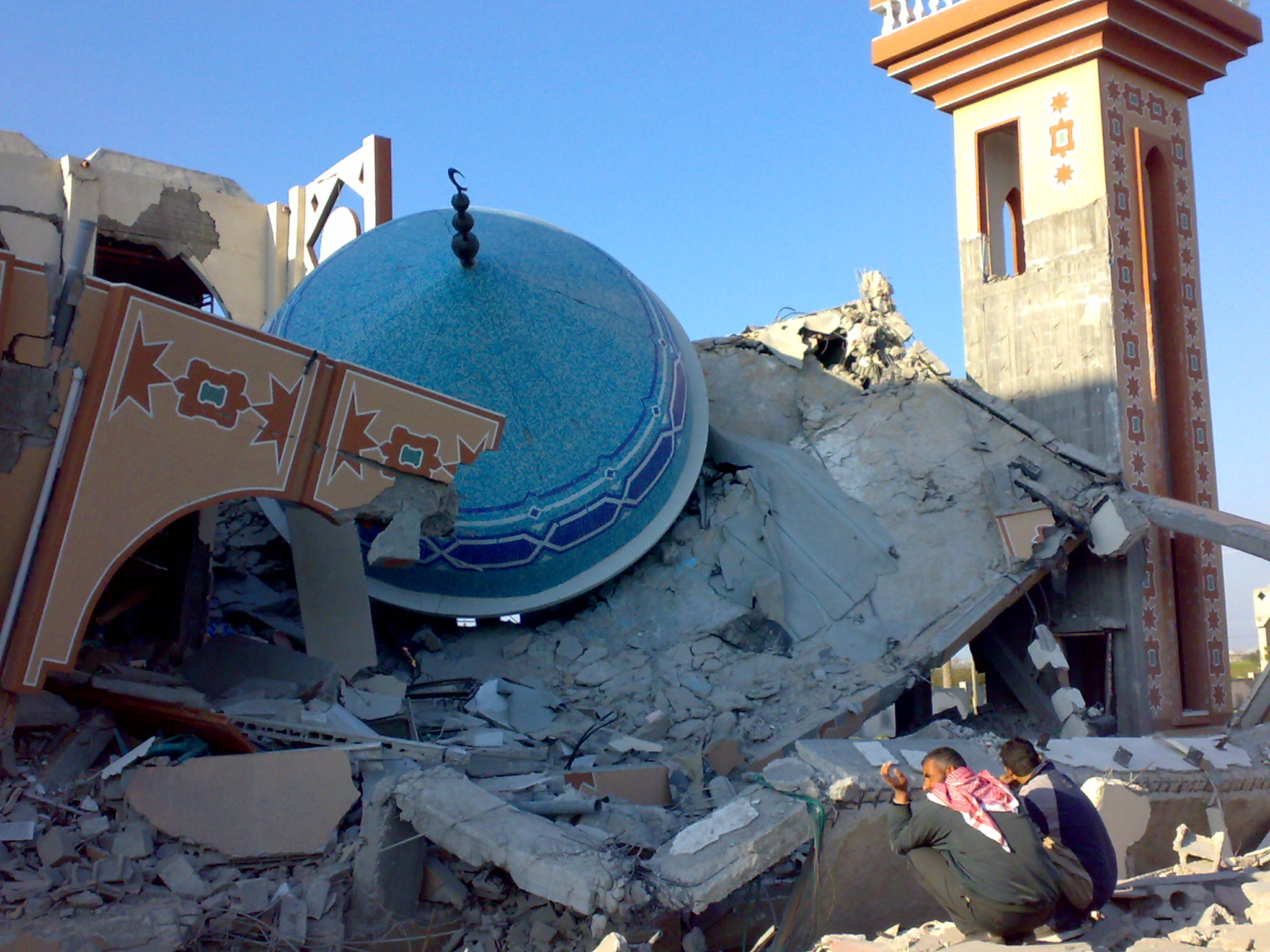
Mosque in Gaza, destroyed during the Gaza War in 2009

As they are considered important to the Muslim community, mosques, like other places of worship, can be at the heart of social conflicts. The Babri Mosque in India was the subject of such a conflict up until the early 1990s when it was demolished. Before a mutual solution could be devised, the mosque was destroyed on December 6, 1992, as the mosque was built by Babur allegedly on the site of a previous Hindu temple marking the birthplace of Rama. The controversy surrounded the mosque was directly linked to rioting in Bombay (present-day Mumbai) as well as bombings in 1993 that killed 257 people.

Bombings in February 2006 and June 2007 seriously damaged Iraq's al-Askari Mosque and exacerbated existing tensions. Other mosque bombings in Iraq, both before and after the February 2006 bombing, have been part of the conflict between the country's groups of Muslims. In June 2005, a suicide bombing killed at least 19 people at an Afghan Shia mosque near Jade Maivand. In April 2006, two explosions occurred at India's Jama Masjid. Following the al-Askari Mosque bombing in Iraq, imams and other Islamic leaders used mosques and Friday prayers as vehicles to call for calm and peace in the midst of widespread violence.

A study 2005 indicated that while support for suicide bombings is not correlated with personal devotion to Islam among Palestinian Muslims, it is correlated with mosque attendance because "participating in communal religious rituals of any kind likely encourages support for self-sacrificing behaviors that are done for the collective good."

Following the September 11 attacks, several American mosques were targeted in attacks ranging from simple vandalism to arson. Furthermore, the Jewish Defense League was suspected of plotting to bomb the King Fahd Mosque in Culver City, California. Similar attacks occurred throughout the United Kingdom following the 7 July 2005 London bombings. Outside the Western world, in June 2001, the Hassan Bek Mosque was the target of vandalism and attacks by hundreds of Israelis after a suicide bomber killed 19 people in a night club in Tel Aviv. Although mosquegoing is highly encouraged for men, it is permitted to stay at home when one feels at risk from Islamophobic persecution.

=== Saudi influence ===
Although the Saudi involvement in Sunni mosques around the world can be traced back to the 1960s, it was not until later in the 20th century that the government of Saudi Arabia became a large influence in foreign Sunni mosques. Beginning in the 1980s, the Saudi Arabian government began to finance the construction of Sunni mosques in countries around the world. An estimated US$45 billion has been spent by the Saudi Arabian government financing mosques and Sunni Islamic schools in foreign countries. Ain al-Yaqeen, a Saudi newspaper, reported in 2002 that Saudi funds may have contributed to building as many as 1,500 mosques and 2,000 other Islamic centers.

Saudi citizens have also contributed significantly to mosques in the Islamic world, especially in countries where they see Muslims as poor and oppressed. Following the fall of the Soviet Union, in 1992, mosques in war-torn Afghanistan saw many contributions from Saudi citizens. The King Fahd Mosque in Culver City, California and the Islamic Cultural Center of Italy in Rome represent two of Saudi Arabia's largest investments in foreign mosques as former Saudi king Fahd bin Abdul Aziz al-Saud contributed US$8 million and US$50 million to the two mosques, respectively.

== See also ==
- Dambana
- Holiest sites in Islam
- Jama'at Khana
- Lists of mosques
- Symbolism of domes
