= Great Mosque of Djenné =

Mosque in Djenné, Mali

- الجامع الكبير في جينيه
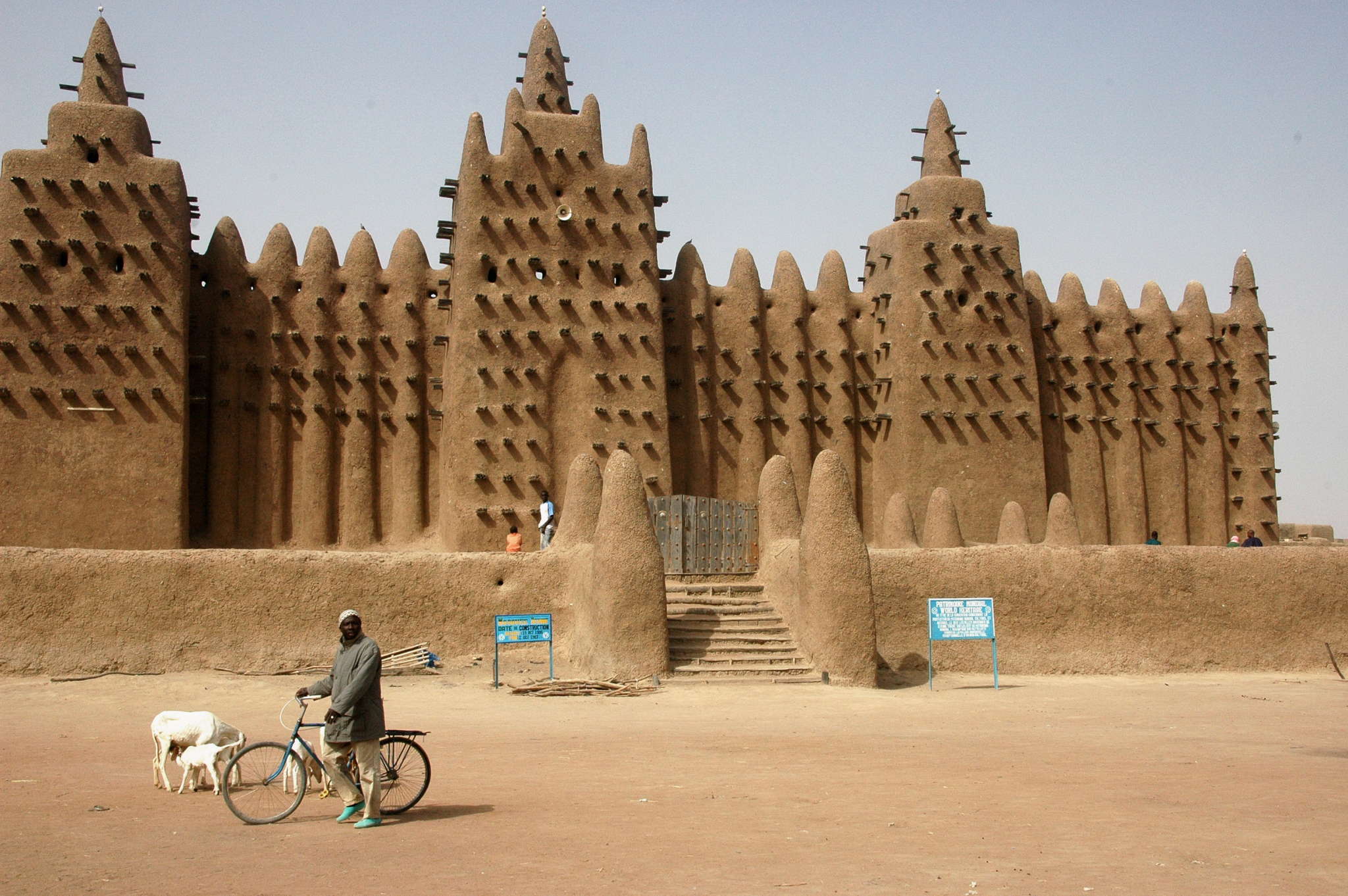
- The Great Mosque's signature trio of minarets overlooks the central market of Djenné.

Religion
- Affiliation: Islam
- Status: In use

Location
- Location: Djenné, Mopti, Mali
- Interactive map of Great Mosque of Djenné
- Coordinates: 13°54′19″N 4°33′20″W

Architecture
- Type: Mosque
- Style: Sudano-Sahelian
- Completed: 13th–14th century; rebuilt in 1906

Specifications
- Height (max): 16 metres (52 ft)
- Minaret: 3
- Materials: Adobe

The Great Mosque of Djenné (Note: Arabic: الجامع الكبير في جينيه, romanized: al-Jāmiʻ al-Kabīr fī Jinih) in the Sudano-Sahelian architectural style is the largest adobe brick building in the world. The mosque is located in the city of Djenné, Mali, on the flood plain of the Bani River. The first mosque on the site was built around the 13th century, but the current structure dates from 1907. As well as being the centre of the community of Djenné, it is one of the most famous landmarks in Africa. Along with the "Old Towns of Djenné", it was designated a World Heritage Site by UNESCO in 1988.

== History ==
=== The First Mosque ===
The actual date of construction of the first mosque in Djenné is unknown, but dates as early as 1200 and as late as 1330 have been suggested. The earliest document mentioning the mosque is Abd al-Sadi's Tarikh al-Sudan which gives the early history, presumably from the oral tradition as it existed in the mid-seventeenth century. The Tarikh states that a Sultan Kunburu became a Muslim at the end end of the 6th century of the hijra (circa 1200 AD) and had his palace pulled down and the site turned into a mosque. He built another palace for himself near the mosque on the east side. His immediate successor built the towers of the mosque while the following Sultan built the surrounding wall.

According to 'a more recent interpretation' presented by the architectural historian Labelle Prussin, the mosque built by Koy Kounboro was razed by his successor Malaha Tampo, who built a new mosque; this was subsequently replaced by the Songhay ruler Askia Mohammed who "rebuilt the original mosque of Koy Kounboro" at the end of the 15th century. With the Moroccan invasion at the end of the 16th century the Songhay mosque was again destroyed and "that of Tanapo rebuilt." This was the mosque referred to in the Tarikh al-Sudan, the ruins of which were later observed and recorded by French explorers in the 19th century. According to Prussin, "(this) Moroccan mosque was far too sumptuous for the puritanical tastes of Sheku Ahmadu, the Fulbe Massina ruler who controlled the city early in the nineteenth century, so in 1830 he removed its roof timbers and had a more austere structure built on the site of the original Kounboro mosque." This mosque was later replaced by a French-sponsored madrasa at the same time as the new Great Mosque was built in 1909.

After the Tarikh al-Sudan, there is no other written information on the Great Mosque until the French explorer René Caillié visited Djenné in 1828, years after it had been allowed to fall into ruin, and wrote "In Jenné is a mosque built of earth, surmounted by two massive but not high towers; it is rudely constructed, though very large. It is abandoned to thousands of swallows, which build their nests in it. This occasions a very disagreeable smell, to avoid which, the custom of saying prayers in a small outer court has become common."

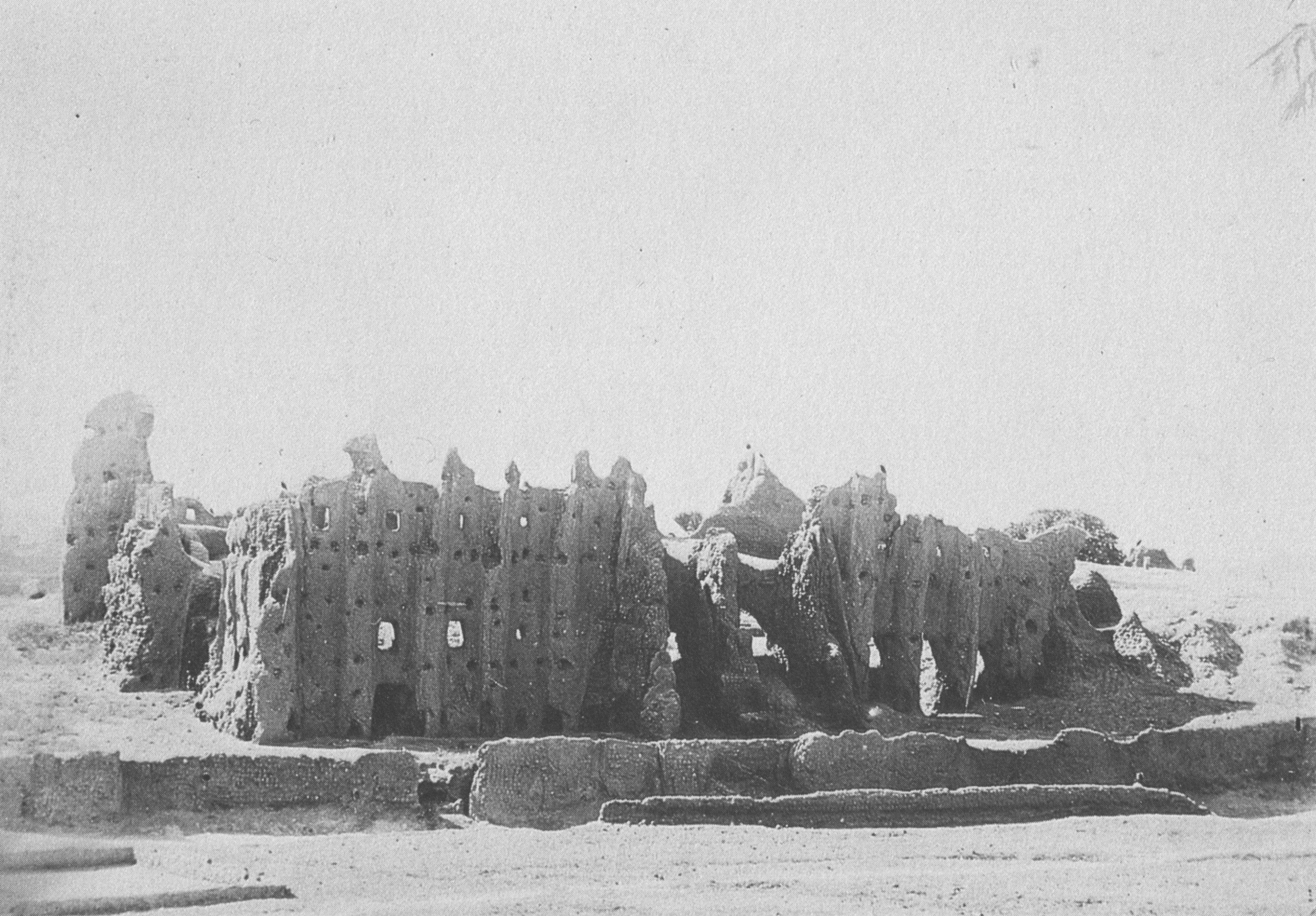
Photo taken by Albert Rousseau in 1893–94

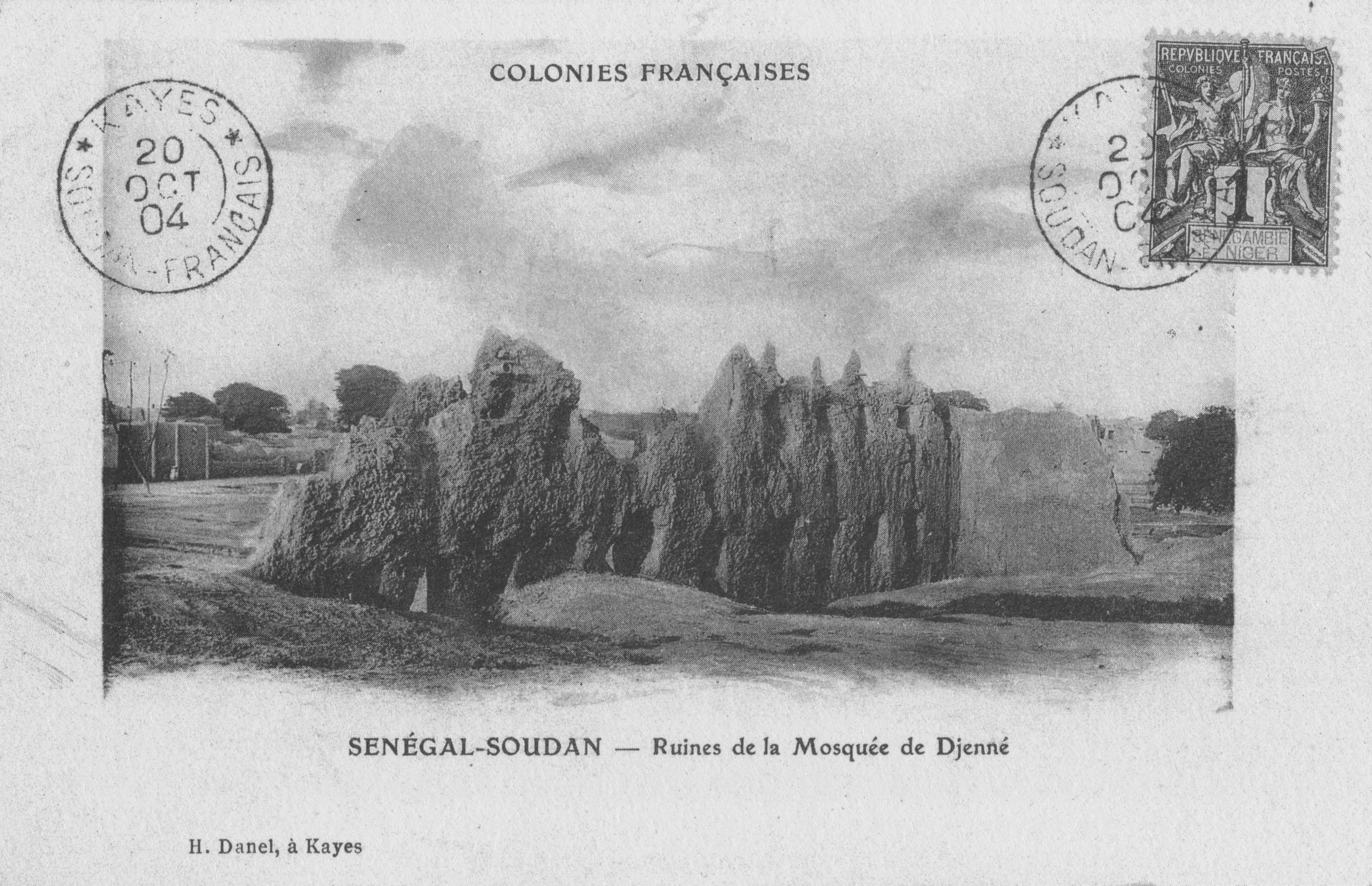
Photo taken by H. Danel in or before 1904

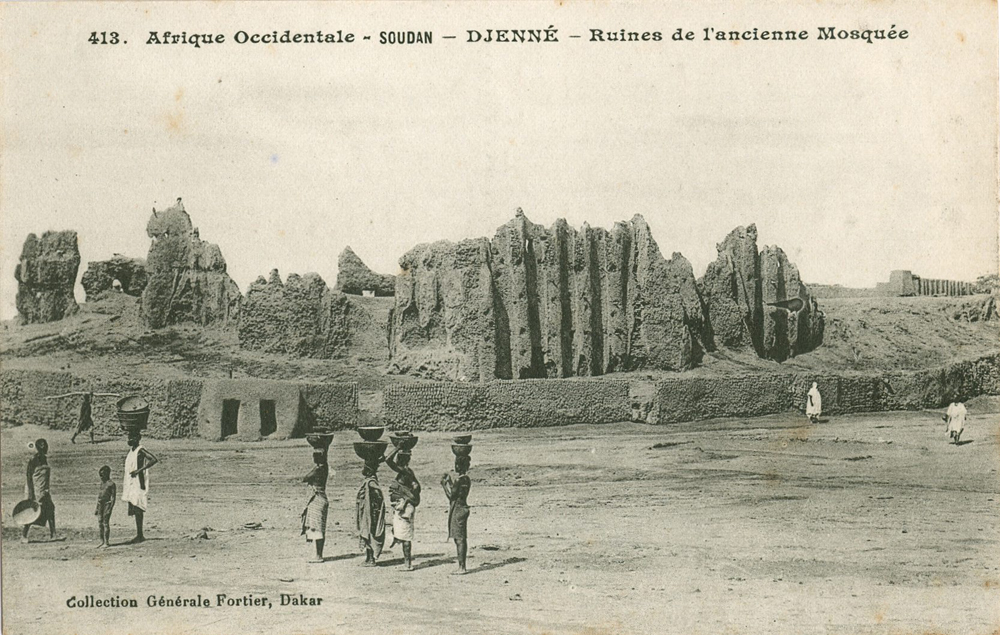
Photo taken by Edmond Fortier in 1906

=== Seku Amadu's mosque ===
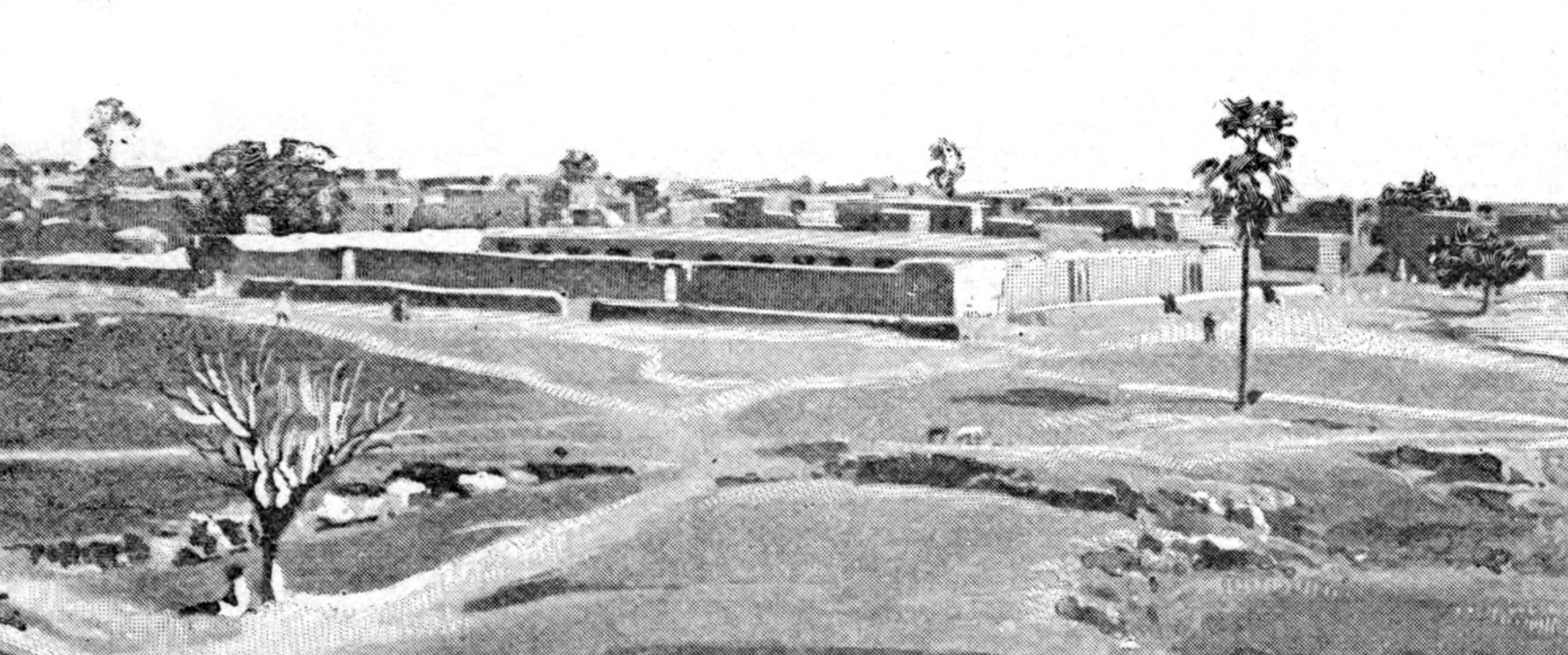
Seku Amadu's mosque from the southwest as it looked in 1895. From Félix Dubois' Tombouctou la Mystérieuse.

Ten years before René Caillié's visit, the Fulani leader Seku Amadu had launched his jihad and conquered the town. Seku Amadu appears to have disapproved of the existing mosque and allowed it to fall into disrepair. This would have been the building that Caillié saw. Seku Amadu had also closed all the small neighbourhood mosques. Between 1834 and 1836, Seku Amadu built a new mosque to the east of the existing one on the site of the former palace. The new mosque was a large, low building, lacking any towers or ornamentation. French forces led by Louis Archinard captured Djenné in April 1893. Soon after, the French journalist Félix Dubois visited the town and described the ruins of the original mosque. At the time of his visit, the interior of the ruined mosque was being used as a cemetery. In his 1897 book, Tombouctou la Mystérieuse (Timbuktu the mysterious), Dubois provides a plan and a drawing as to how he imagined the mosque looked before being abandoned.

=== Present mosque ===
In 1906, the town arranged for the original mosque to be rebuilt and for a school to be constructed on the site of Seku Amadu's mosque. The rebuilding was completed in 1907 using forced labour under the direction of Ismaila Traoré, head of Djenné's guild of masons. From photographs taken at the time, it appears the position of at least some of the outer walls follows those of the original mosque but it is unclear whether the columns supporting the roof kept to the previous arrangement. What was almost certainly novel in the rebuilt mosque was the symmetric arrangement of three large towers in the qibla wall. There has been debate about to what extent the design of the rebuilt mosque was subject to French influence, although it is unlikely that French engineers worked on the building at all.

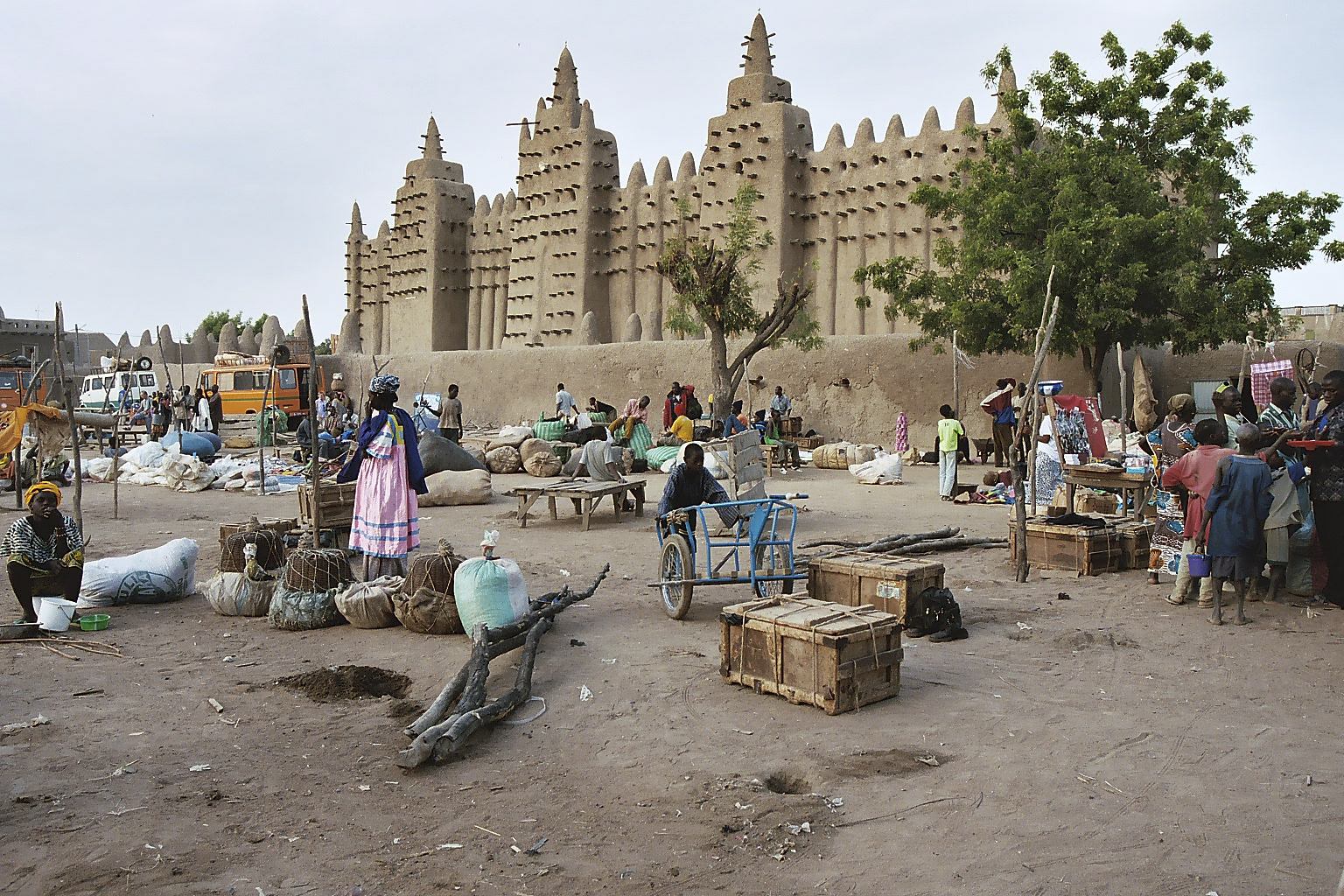
The current mosque, photographed in 2003, behind the town's market

Dubois revisited Djenné in 1910 and was shocked by the reconstructed mosque. He believed that the French colonial administration were responsible for the design and wrote that it looked like a cross between a hedgehog and a church organ. He thought that the cones made the building resemble a baroque temple dedicated to the god of suppositories. By contrast, Jean-Louis Bourgeois has argued that the French had little influence except perhaps for the internal arches and that the design is "basically African." Ismaila Traoré, head of Djenne's guild of masons and renowned throughout the Sahel, was the architect for the reconstruction of the Djenné mosque.

French ethnologist Michel Leiris, in his account of travelling through Mali in 1931, states that the new mosque is indeed the work of Europeans. He also says that local people were so unhappy with the reconstructed building that they refused to clean it, only doing so when threatened with prison. Jean-Louis Bourgeois however, recorded that the rebuilt mosque was constructed by Djenné's traditional local guild of masons, traditionally responsible for the building and maintenance of the town's original mosque and of Djenné's other buildings, using traditional techniques and with minimal French involvement. A problem concerning the mosque arose from Djenné's local politics: most of the city's inhabitants – including the Islamic elite who were harassed by Seku Amadu and humiliated by the destruction of the old mosque – wanted an exact rebuilding of the old mosque in their vision.

The terrace in front of the eastern wall includes two tombs. The larger tomb to the south contains the remains of Almany Ismaïla, an important imam of the 18th century. Early in the French colonial period, a pond located on the eastern side of the mosque was filled with earth to create the open area that is now used for the weekly market.

Electrical wiring and indoor plumbing have been added to many mosques in Mali. In some cases, the original surfaces of mosques have even been tiled over, destroying their historical appearances and in some cases compromising the building's structural integrity. While the Great Mosque has been equipped with a loudspeaker system, the citizens of Djenné have resisted modernization in favor of the building's historical integrity. Many historical preservationists have praised the community's preservation effort, and interest in this aspect of the building grew in the 1990s.

The mosque is seen in the 2005 film Sahara.

== Design ==
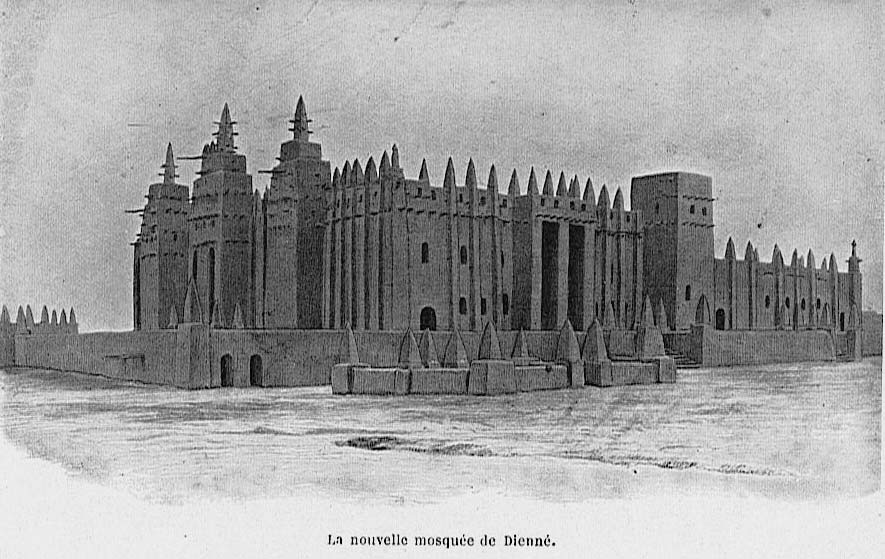
View of the Great Mosque from the northeast as it looked in 1910. From Félix Dubois' Notre beau Niger.

The walls of the Great Mosque are made of sun-baked earth bricks (called ferey), and sand and earth-based mortar, and are coated with a plaster which gives the building its smooth, sculpted look. The walls of the building are decorated with bundles of rodier palm (Borassus aethiopum) sticks, called toron, that project about 60 cm (2.0 ft) from the surface. The toron also serve as readymade scaffolding for the annual repairs. Ceramic half-pipes also extend from the roofline and direct rain water from the roof away from the walls.

The mosque is built on a platform measuring about 75 m × 75 m (246 ft × 246 ft) that is raised by 3 metres (9.8 feet) above the level of the marketplace. The platform prevents damage to the mosque when the Bani River floods. It is accessed by six sets of stairs, each decorated with pinnacles. The main entrance is on the northern side of the building. The outer walls of the Great Mosque are not precisely orthogonal to one another so that the plan of the building has a noticeable trapezoidal outline.

The prayer wall or qibla of the Great Mosque faces east towards Mecca and overlooks the city marketplace. The qibla is dominated by three large, box-like towers or minarets jutting out from the main wall. The central tower is around 16 metres in height. The cone shaped spires or pinnacles at the top of each minaret are topped with ostrich eggs. The eastern wall is about a metre (3 ft) in thickness and is strengthened on the exterior by eighteen pilaster like buttresses, each of which is topped by a pinnacle. The corners are formed by rectangular-shaped buttresses decorated with toron and topped by pinnacles.

The prayer hall, measuring about 26 by 50 metres (85 by 164 ft), occupies the eastern half of the mosque behind the qibla wall. The mud-covered, rodier-palm roof is supported by nine interior walls running north–south which are pierced by pointed arches that reach up almost to the roof. This design creates a forest of ninety massive rectangular pillars that span the interior prayer hall and severely reduce the field of view. The small, irregularly-positioned windows on the north and south walls allow little natural light to reach the interior of the hall. The floor is composed of sandy earth.

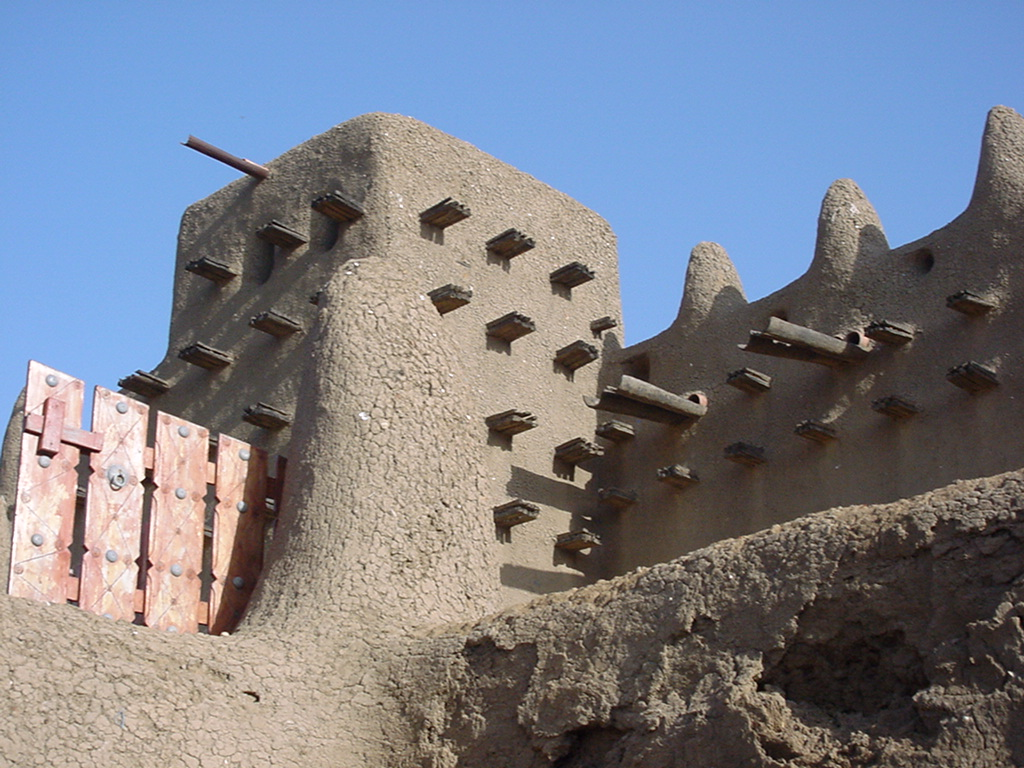
Bundles of rodier palm sticks embedded in the walls of the Great Mosque are used for decoration and serve as scaffolding for annual repairs.

In the prayer hall, each of the three towers in the qibla wall has a niche or mihrab. The imam conducts the prayers from the mihrab in the larger central tower. A narrow opening in the ceiling of the central mihrab connects with a small room situated above roof level in the tower. In earlier times, a crier would repeat the words of the imam to people in the town. To the right of the mihrab in the central tower is a second niche, the pulpit or minbar, from which the imam preaches his Friday sermon.

The towers in the qibla wall do not contain stairs linking the prayer hall with the roof. Instead there are two square towers housing stairs leading to the roof. One set of stairs is located at the southwestern corner of the prayer hall while the other set, situated near the main entrance on the northern side, is only accessible from the exterior of the mosque. Small vents in the roof are topped with removable inverted kiln-fired bowls, which when removed allow hot air to rise out of the building and so ventilate the interior.

The interior courtyard to the west of the prayer hall, measuring 20 m × 46 m (66 ft × 151 ft), is surrounded on three sides by galleries. The walls of the galleries facing the courtyard are punctuated by arched openings. The western gallery is reserved for use by women.

Though it benefits from regular maintenance, since the facade's construction in 1907, only small changes have been made to the design. Rather than a single central niche, the mihrab tower originally had a pair of large recesses echoing the form of the entrance arches in the north wall. The mosque also had many fewer toron with none on the corner buttresses. It is evident from published photographs that two additional rows of toron were added to the walls in the early 1990s.

== Cultural significance ==
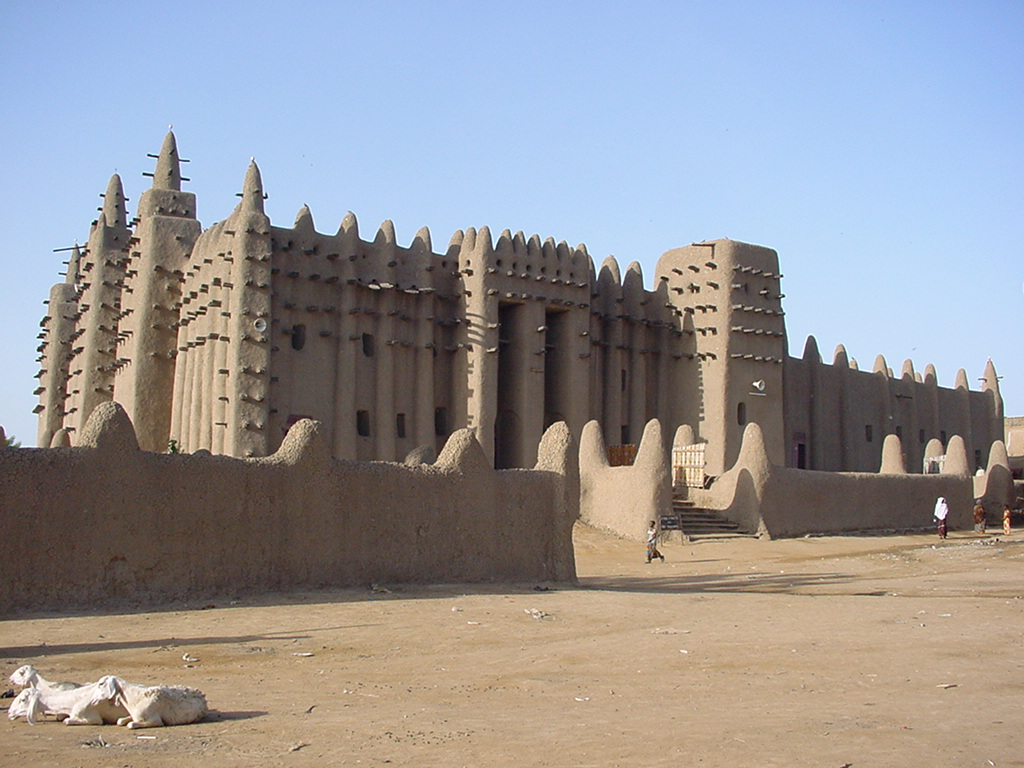
The main entrance is in the north wall

The entire community of Djenné takes an active role in the mosque's maintenance during an annual festival. This includes music and food, but is mainly to repair the damage inflicted on the mosque in the past year (mostly erosion caused by the annual rains and cracks caused by changes in temperature and humidity). In the days before the festival, the plaster is prepared in pits. It requires several days to cure but needs to be periodically stirred, a task usually falling to young boys who play in the mixture, thus stirring up the contents. Men climb onto the mosque's built-in scaffolding and ladders made of palm wood and smear the plaster over the face of the mosque.

Another group of men carries the plaster from the pits to the workmen on the mosque. A race is held at the beginning of the festival to see who will be the first to deliver the plaster to the mosque. Women and girls carry water to the pits before the festival and to the workmen on the mosque during it. Members of Djenné's masons guild direct the work, while elderly members of the community, who have already participated in the festival many times, sit in a place of honour in the market square watching the proceedings.

In 1930, an inexact replica of the mosque was built in the town of Fréjus in southern France. The imitation, the Missiri mosque, was built in cement and painted in red ochre to resemble the colour of the original. It was intended to serve as a mosque for the Tirailleurs sénégalais, the West African colonial troops in the French Army who were posted to the region during the winter.

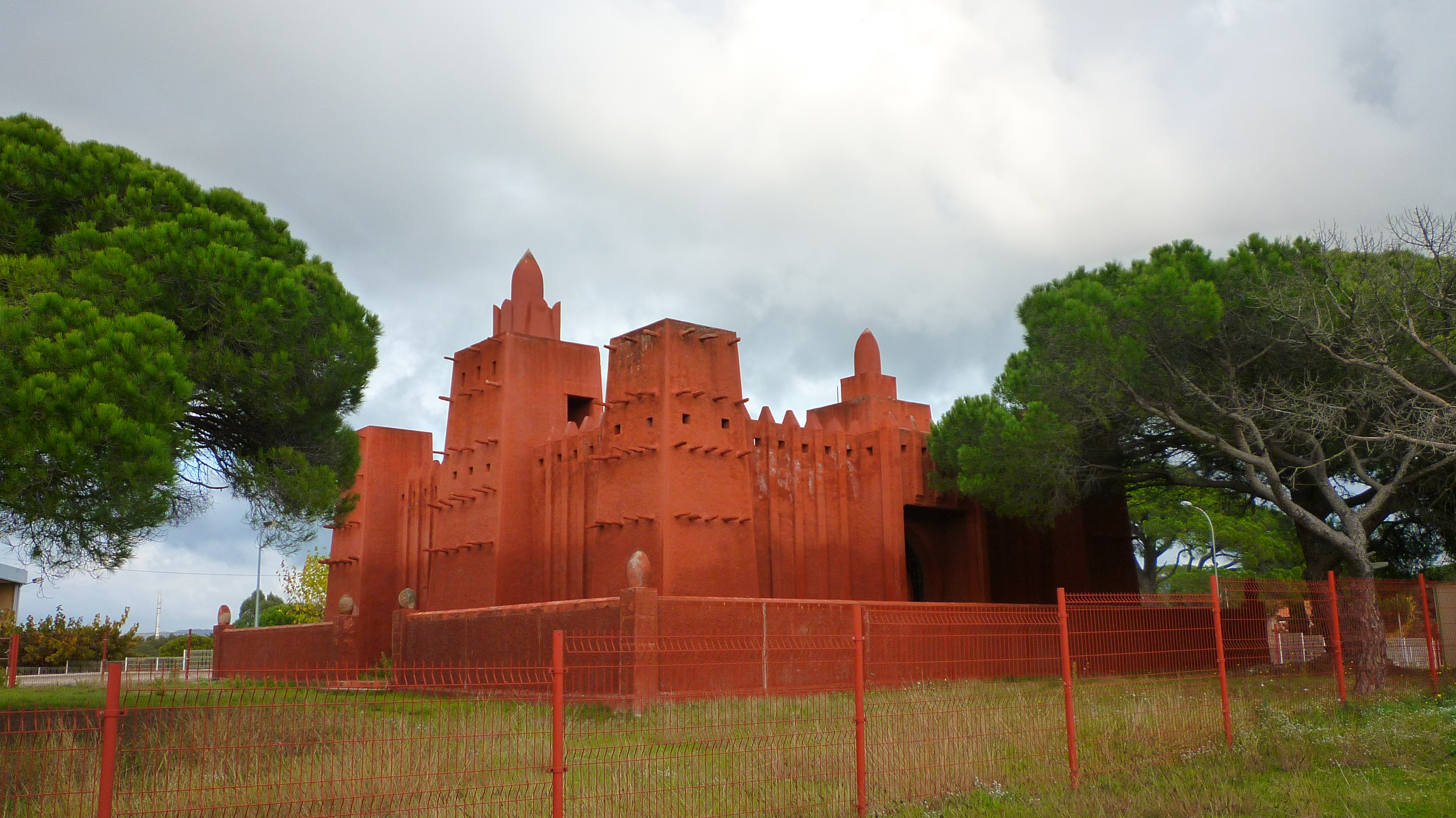
A 1930 replica of the mosque in the French commune of Fréjus

The original mosque presided over one of the most important Islamic learning centers in Africa during the Middle Ages, with thousands of students coming to study the Quran in Djenné's madrassas. The historic areas of Djenné, including the Great Mosque, were designated a World Heritage Site by UNESCO in 1988. While there are many mosques that are older than its current incarnation, the Great Mosque remains the most prominent symbol of both the city of Djenné and the nation of Mali.

On 20 January 2006, the sight of a team of men hacking at the roof of the mosque sparked a riot in the town. The team were inspecting the roof as part of a restoration project financed by the Aga Khan Trust for Culture. The men quickly disappeared to avoid being lynched. In the mosque the mob ripped out the ventilation fans that had been presented by the US Embassy at the time of the Iraq War and then went on a rampage through the town. The crowd ransacked the Cultural Mission, the mayor's home, destroyed the car belonging to the imam's younger brother and damaged three cars belonging to the Imam himself. The local police were overwhelmed and had to call in reinforcements from Mopti. One man died during the disturbances.

On Thursday 5 November 2009, the upper section of the southern large tower of the qibla wall collapsed after 75 mm (3 inches) of rain had fallen in a 24-hour period. The Aga Khan Trust for Culture funded the rebuilding of the tower.

The mosque features on the coat of arms of Mali.

== 3D documentation with laser-scanning ==
The 3D documentation of the Djenné Mosque was carried out in 2005 using terrestrial laser-scanning. This formed part of the Zamani Project that aims to document cultural heritage sites in 3D to create a record for future generations.

== Video games ==
The mosque is a Wonder Building in the historical strategy games Sid Meier's Civilization V, Age of Empires II, and Age of Empires IV.

== See also ==
- Lists of mosques
- List of mosques in Africa
- African Architecture
- Islamic architecture
- Islam in Mali
- West African Mosques
