= Grand Mosque of Bobo-Dioulasso =

Mosque in Houet, Hauts-Bassins, Burkina Faso

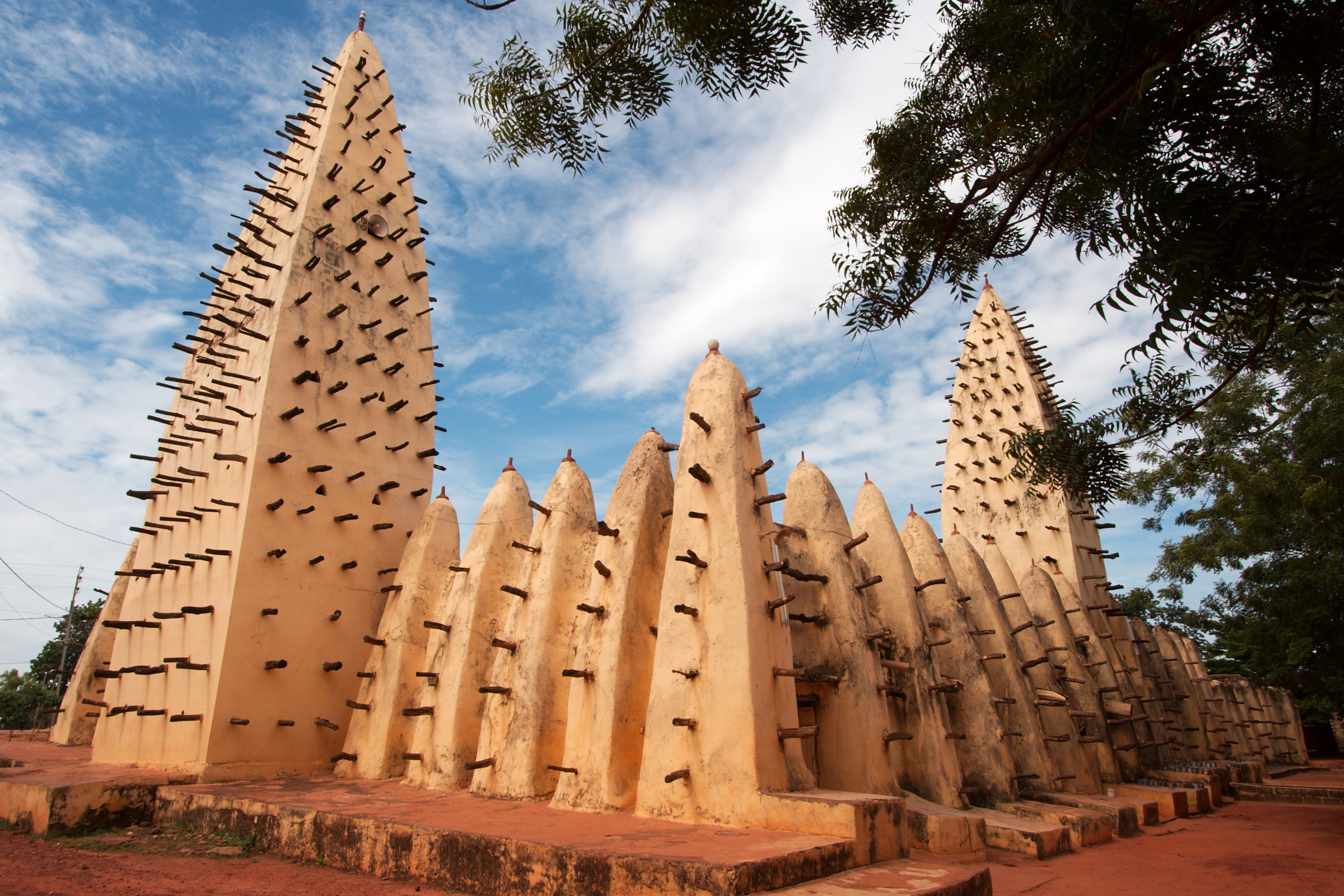

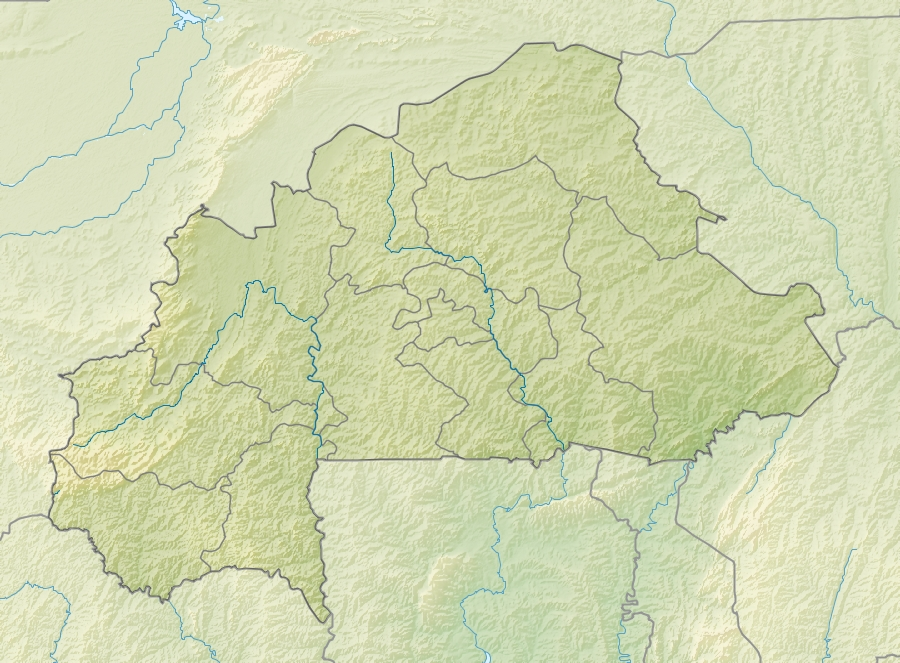
- Location within Burkina Faso

Religion
- Affiliation: Islam

Location
- Location: Bobo-Dioulasso, Houet, Hauts-Bassins
- Country: Burkina Faso
- Interactive map of Grand Mosque of Bobo-Dioulasso
- Coordinates: 11°10′40″N 4°17′45″W

Architecture
- Type: mosque
- Groundbreaking: 1812
- Completed: 1832

Specifications
- Minaret: 2
- Materials: Mud bricks; timber

The Grand Mosque of Bobo-Dioulasso is a mosque in Bobo-Dioulasso, Houet Province, Hauts-Bassins Region, Burkina Faso.

== History ==
At the end of the 18th century, the area where the mosque is currently located was under the rule of Kingdom of Sia. At that time, the kingdom was in danger due to the hostility from the Kénédougou Kingdom. Tieba Traoré, the king of Kénédougou Kingdom, mobilized his troops towards the capital of Sia. The King of Sia was desperate to look for assistance to defend his kingdom. He eventually met with a local Islamic religious leader Almamy Sidiki Sanou who was ready to help. In return, Sanou requested King of Sia to construct a mosque. The Kénédougou Kingdom was stopped around 30 km from the capital of Sia, and eventually, the Grand Mosque of Bobo-Dioulasso was constructed.

The construction of the mosque started in 1812 and was completed in 1832. Since then, the mosque has undergone several renovations for enlargement and reparation. In 1983, a tin roof was constructed to cover part of the courtyard.

== Architecture ==
The mosque was constructed from mud brick, projected wooden beams and horizontal beams. It consists of two minarets. The prayer hall consists of two parts which were constructed at different periods. The older section of the prayer hall is located at the eastern end and consists of seven transverse aisles. The newer section is located at the western end and consists of two more transverse aisles.

== See also ==
- Islam in Burkina Faso
- West African Mosques
