= Missiri Mosque =

- Mosquée de Missiri
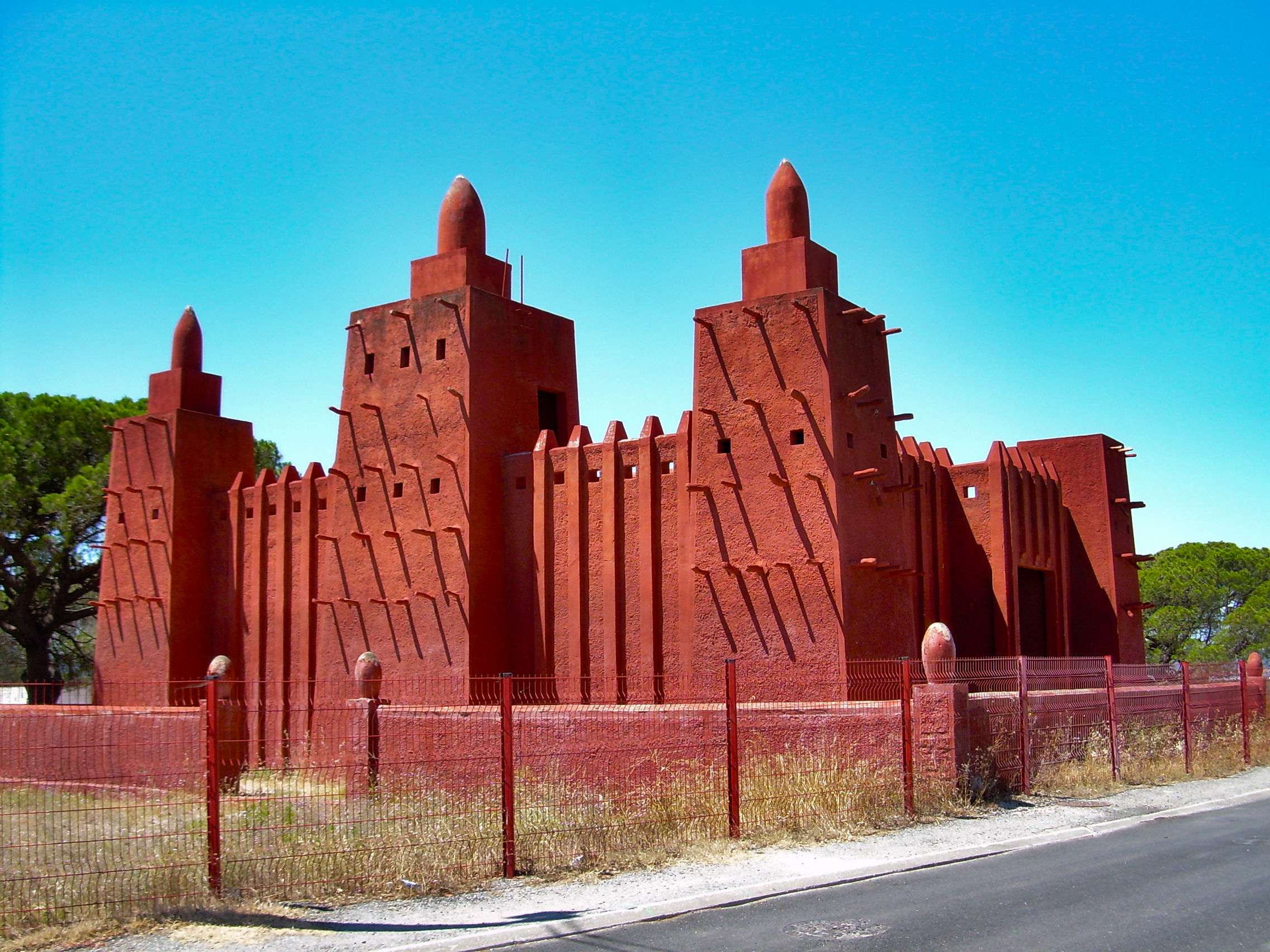

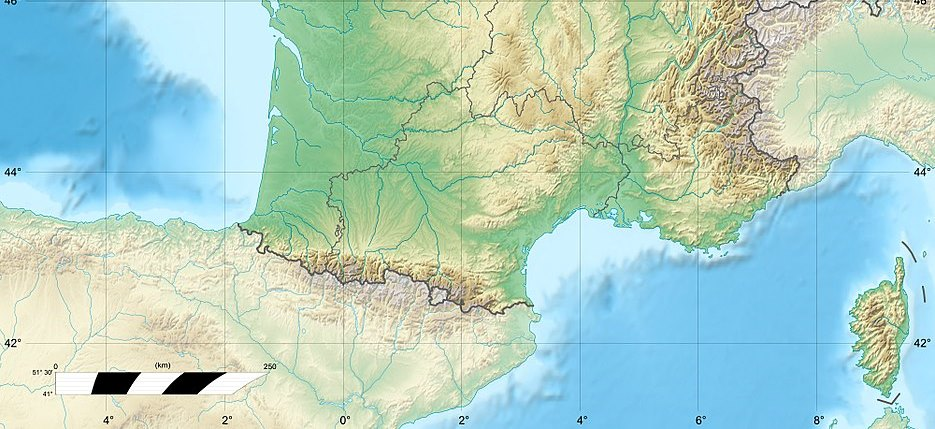
- Location within France South
- Interactive map of the Missiri Mosque area

General information
- Status: closed
- Type: Community center
- Architectural style: Neo Sudano-Sahelian
- Location: Fréjus, Provence-Alpes-Côte d'Azur, France
- Coordinates: 43°27′27.59″N 6°43′37.71″E
- Current tenants: French army
- Construction started: 1928
- Completed: 1930

Monument historique
- Official name: Mosquée Missiri
- Designated: 1987
- Reference no.: PA00081616

The Missiri Mosque (French: Mosquée de Missiri) is a former French military community center inspired by sub-Saharan Islamic architecture. It was constructed in 1928–1930 for the Senegalese Tirailleurs based in military camps in Fréjus, in the southern France. Although its appearance evokes that of a mosque, its purpose and uses remained secular.

The building was included in the supplementary inventory of French historic monuments on 18 June 1987.

== History ==
The Senegalese Tirailleurs (French: Tirailleurs Sénégalais) was a corps of colonial infantry in the French Army. They were initially recruited from Senegal and subsequently throughout the sub-Saharan regions of the French colonial empire. These infantry units took on the adjective "sénégalese" since that was where the first African Tirailleur regiment had been formed in 1857 by Louis Faidherbe, governor-general of French West Africa.

At the outbreak of World War I, 37 battalions of French, North African and Senegalese infantry were transferred from Morocco to France. Five Senegalese battalions were soon serving on the Western Front, while others formed part of the reduced French garrison in Morocco. On the Western Front, the Senegalese Tirailleurs served with distinction at Ypres and Dixmude during the First Battle of Ypres in late 1914, at the capture of Fort Douaumont in October 1916, during the Battle of Chemin des Dames in April 1917 and at the Second Battle of the Marne in 1918. Losses were particularly heavy in Flanders (estimated from 3,200 to 4,800) and Chemin des Dames (7,000 out of 15,500 tirailleurs engaged).

In 1915, the French high command realized that the war would last far longer than they had originally imagined. They authorized a major recruitment drive in West Africa and 93 Senegalese battalions were raised between 1915 and 1918. The harsh conditions of trench warfare were a particular source of suffering to the un-acclimatized African soldiers and, after 1914/15, the practice was adopted of withdrawing them to the south of France for training and re-equipping each winter.

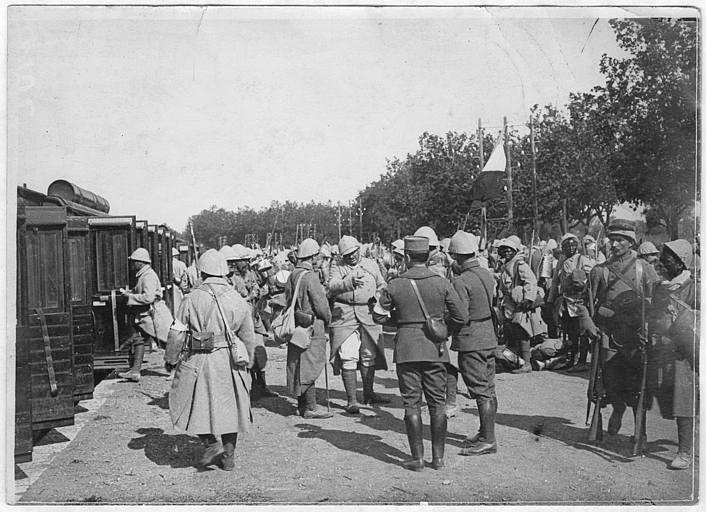
The departure of Senegalese tirailleurs at Fréjus for the front in 1915.

Fréjus welcomed, on the initiative of General Joseph Gallieni, then military governor of Paris, the first overseas troops in 1915 and became a transition site for these soldiers, allowing them to acclimatize before their departure for the front. Military camps and hospitals were then built to accommodate troops coming from the then French colonies in Africa and French Indochina.

After the war, not everyone is repatriated. As early as 1925, the military imagined building a community center for the colonial troops so that the soldiers would not feel too isolated outside their home country and to combat homesickness and improve moral. They decided to build the Missiri after tensions with their comrades-in-arms, the Tirailleurs indochinois who had built in Fréjus, as early as 1917, the Hông Hiên Tu pagoda dedicated to Vietnamese Buddhism of the Mahayana tradition.

During the interwar period and after the Second World War, the military camps around Fréjus developed their role as training centers, before departure for external operations for the French Far East Expeditionary Corps in Indochina, Madagascar and later North Africa. The last unit of Senegalese Tirailleurs was disbanded in 1962.

The building was included in the supplementary inventory of French historic monuments on 18 June 1987. The site is nowadays more a monument than a place of prayer and worship in this roofless building with its unfinished murals. The mosque is the property of the French Ministry of Armed Forces. The museum of the Troupes de Marine in Fréjus is in charge of its preservation.

== Description ==
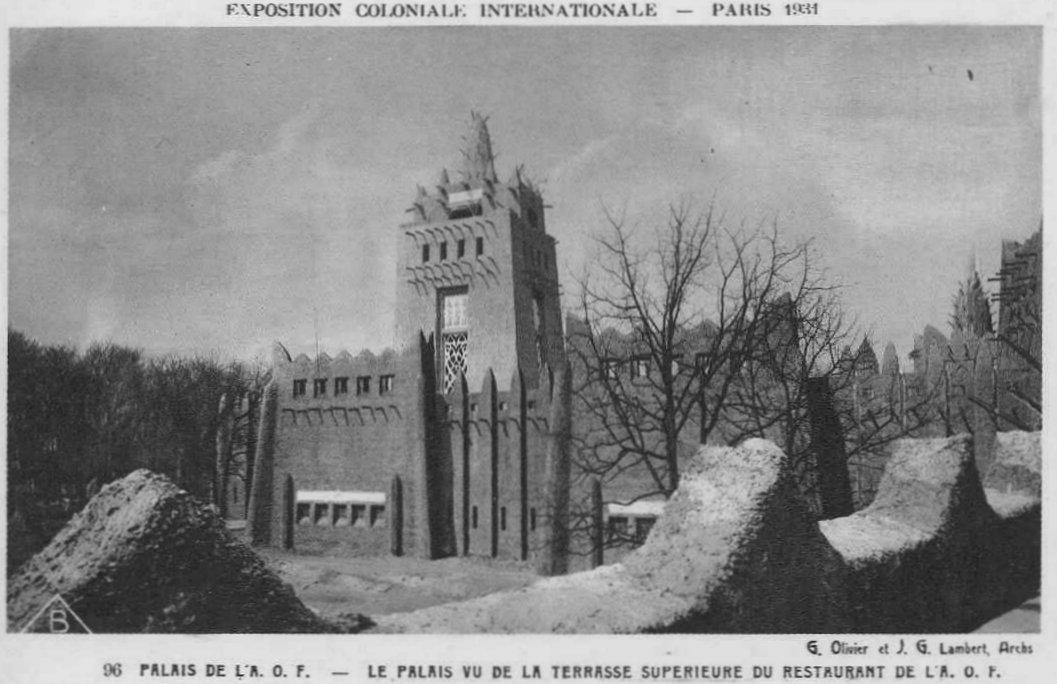
French West Africa Pavilion at the Paris Colonial Exposition in 1931, imitating the Great Mosque of Djenné in Mali.

The building stands on the outskirts of Fréjus in the former military camp of Caïs. Captain Abdel Kader Mademba, supported by Colonel Lame, then commander in arms, took the initiative for the project and built a mosque in the Caïs camp on the road to Bagnols-en-Forêt.

The construction started in 1928. Completed in 1930, it received the name of Missiri, which means "mosque" in the western African language Bambara. Its architecture is inspired by that of the Great Mosque of Djenné in Mali. A second replica of this mosque existed in France. Built in the Bois de Vincennes, for the Paris Colonial Exposition of 1931, it was demolished shortly after the end of the exhibition.

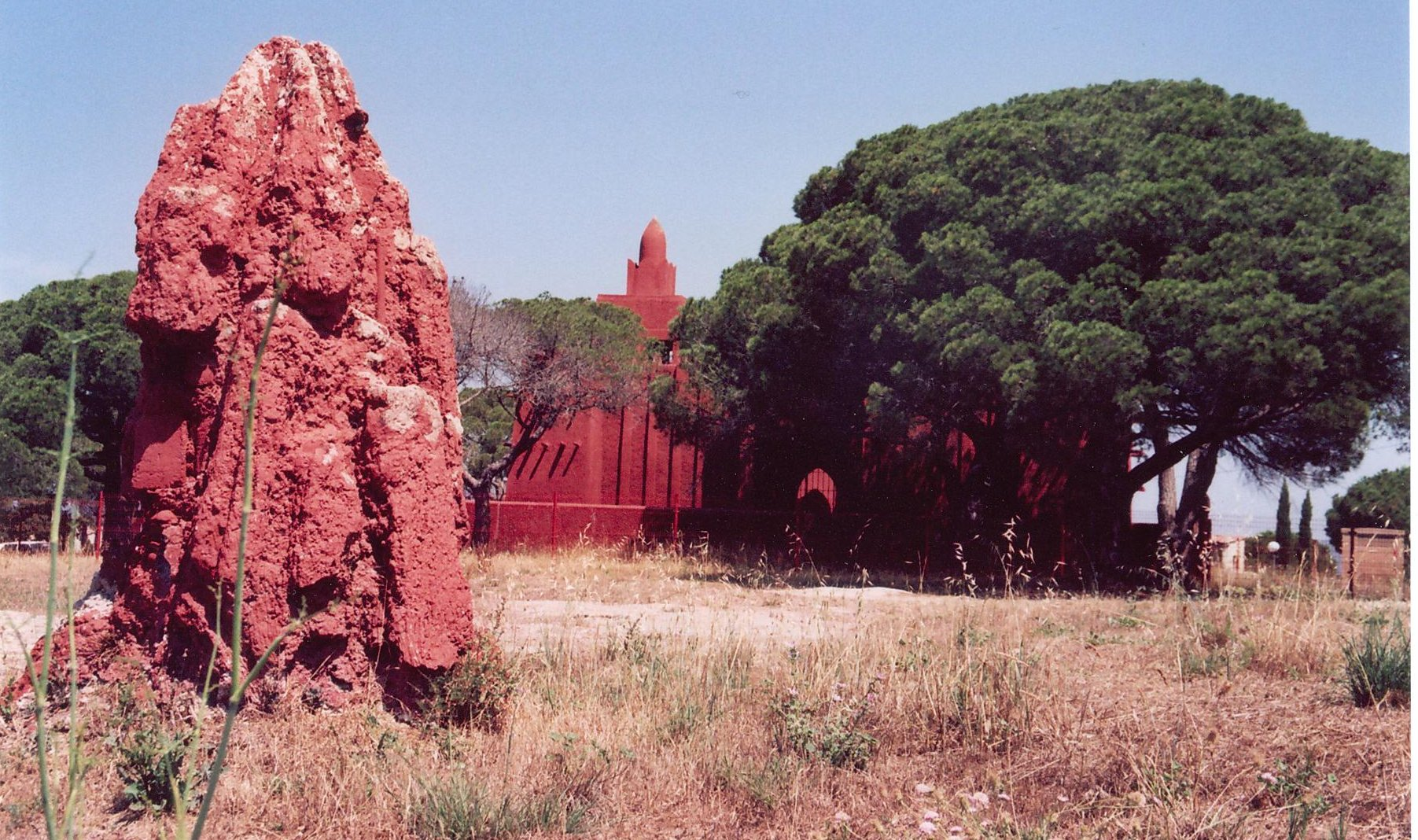
Reconstructed termite mounds next to the Missiri mosque.

At the time, it was embellished with African huts and reconstructed termite mounds with the aim of, according tho Captain Abdel Kader Mademba "giving the black skirmishers the illusion, as faithful as possible, of the materialization of a setting similar to the one they had left; that he finds there, in the evening, during interminable palaver, the echoes of the tam-tam echoing against the walls of a familiar construction, evocative of visions likely to soften the feeling of isolation from which he is sometimes afflicted, placing him, as it were, in a native atmosphere."

The French newspaper L'Illustration devoted an article on 2 June 1928 to the undertaking of Captain Abdel Kader Mademba:

La future mosquée, de cette couleur rouge, sombre et vive à la fois, qu'avait le Pavillon de l'Afrique occidentale française aux Arts décoratifs, sera faite en agglomérés et en ciment. Ce sera une œuvre collective où chacun apportera sa part. Déjà, le maire de Fréjus a offert une partie des matériaux (sable et pierres) pour rien ; d'autre part, l'aviation maritime s'est chargée des transports ; enfin, la main d'œuvre, abondante et gratuite, sera assurée par la garnison et les coloniaux de là bas. Cependant, les frais demeurent encore considérables. Il faut prévoir, nous écrit le lieutenant-colonel J. Ferrandi, secrétaire général de "La France militaire", une dépense d'environ, 50 000 francs.

— L'Illustration (2 June 1928)

The future mosque, of that same red color, dark and bright at the same time, which the French West Africa Pavilion at the Decorative Arts had, will be made of agglomerates and cement. It will be a collective work where everyone will contribute their share. Already, the mayor of Fréjus has offered a part of the materials (sand and stones) for nothing; on the other hand, the maritime aviation has taken care of the transport; finally, the labor, abundant and free, will be provided by the garrison and the colonials from there. However, the costs were still considerable. It is necessary to foresee," wrote Lieutenant-Colonel J. Ferrandi, Secretary-General of "La France Militaire", "an expenditure of approximately 50,000 francs.

— L'Illustration (2 June 1928)

The Missiri mosque is entirely made of reinforced concrete covered with red plaster, to match the soil tones around Fréjus (the original is made of mudbricks with a dominant yellow ochre color). It has a square floor plan with four wings surrounding a central courtyard opening onto the galleries with horseshoe arches. The corners are flanked by turrets and two large central towers, to the east and west, shelter the stairs leading to the terrace. On the outer walls, plastered concrete spikes imitate the wooden beams holding the mudbrick structure of the original mosque. Inside, the murals depicting a camel and Senegalese Tirailleurs are unfinished. With its external wall measuring 21 m × 21 m (69 ft × 69 ft), the Missiri has a central uncovered 9 m × 9 m (30 ft × 30 ft) courtyard.

Although its appearance evokes that of a mosque, its purpose and uses remained secular. The Missiri does not include a wall directed to Mecca, a mihrab or a covered prayer area, which are important architectural elements of a proper place of worship for Muslims. Muslim Senegalese tirailleurs prayed in an open area (musalla) outside Missiri.

== See also ==
- Islam in France
- List of mosques in France
- Tata of Chasselay
