= Agadez Mosque =

Mosque in Agadez, Tchirozerine, Niger

- Mosquée d'Agadez
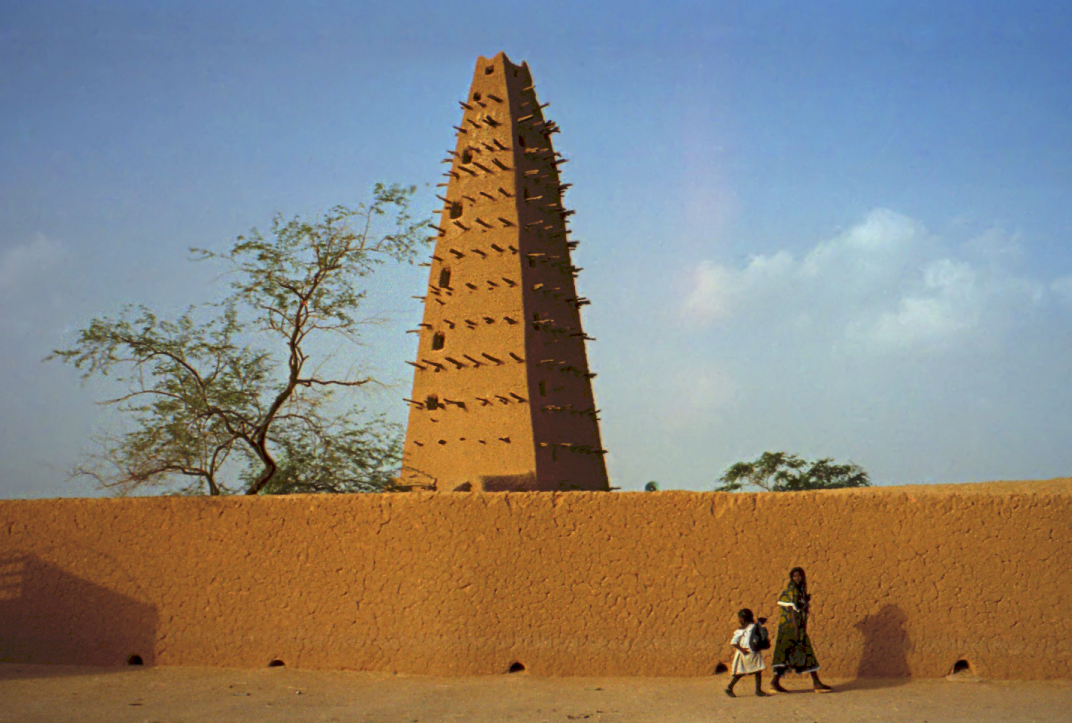

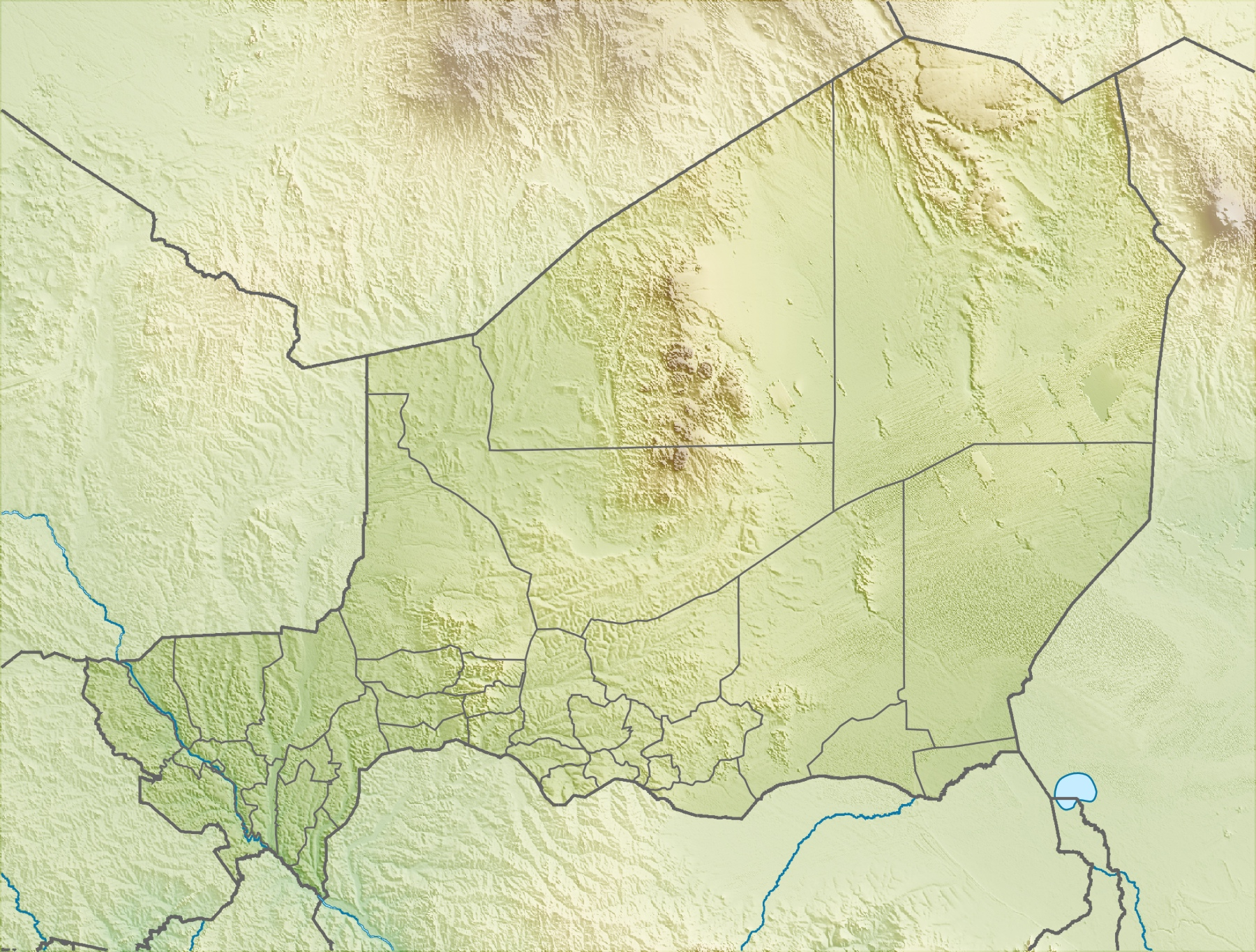
- Location within Niger

Religion
- Affiliation: Sunni Islam
- Ecclesiastical or organisational status: Mosque
- Status: Active

Location
- Location: Agadez, Tchirozerine, Niger
- Interactive map of Agadez Mosque
- Coordinates: 16°58′27.0″N 7°59′18.2″E

Architecture
- Type: Mosque
- Established: 1515
- Materials: Mud-bricks

Agadez Mosque (French: Mosquée d'Agadez) is a prominent mosque in Agadez, Tchirozerine Department, Niger. It was made of clay and is the tallest mud-brick structure in the world. The Agadez mosque is the most prominent religious center located in the central part of the Republic of the Niger, and has been a place of worship for centuries.

The mosque hosts thousands of Muslims for Friday's prayers. Every year, Muslims travel long distance to visit the mosque for tourism and spiritual purposes.

== History ==
The mosque was built in 1515 at the time when the city was captured by the Songhai Empire. It was restored and some of it was rebuilt in 1844.

This mosque was built by Imam Bakhili, a famous Muslim scholar, who originated from the Algeria region. Legend has it that he built this mosque in a single night between Isha prayer and dawn.

Due to the mosque bearing some resemblance to the construction techniques used in structures around Timbuktu, it is believed that the Tuareg people went there in order to learn the architectural techniques for the construction of the mosque. By using local available materials, which were dried in the sun, the builders created a long-lasting durable structure.

The central shrine in Agadez is accompanied by a minaret which is some 27 meters (89 feet) tall, making it the tallest ever constructed of mud brick. The mosque serves as a compass for the people to get around the city, and at one point of time throughout its history, served as a watchtower.

The mosque is a beacon of the long-running history of the city that has survived the harsh desert environment.

== See also ==
- Lists of mosques
- List of mosques in Africa
- West African Mosques
