= Old Towns of Djenné =

- Villes anciennes de Djenné (French)
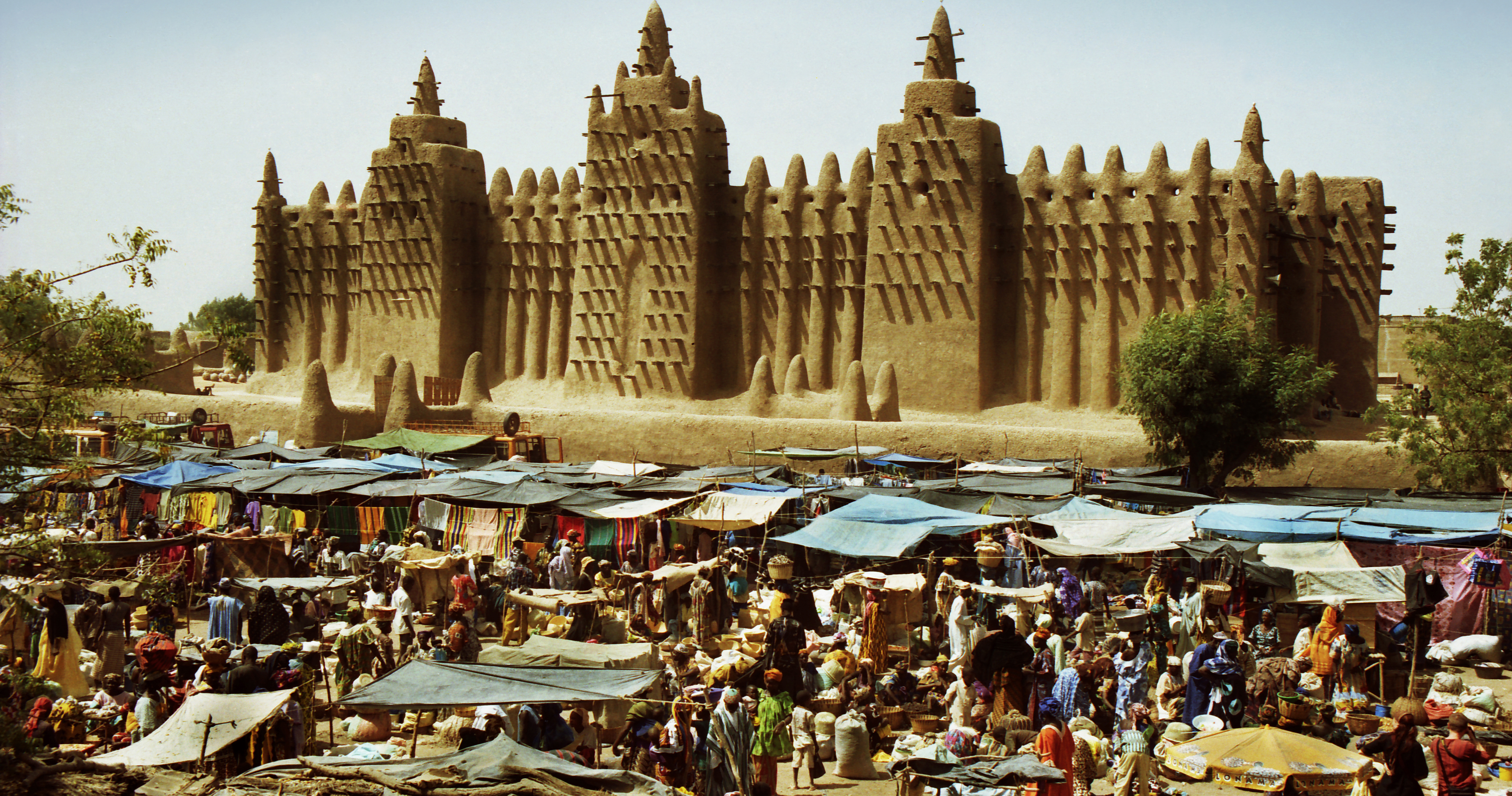
- Great Clay Mosque

- Location within Mali
- 13°54′23.004″N 4°33′18″W
- Type: Settlement
- Location: Djenné, Mali

UNESCO World Heritage Site
- Official name: Old Towns of Djenné
- Type: Cultural
- Criteria: (iii)(iv)
- Designated: 1988
- Reference no.: 116rev
- Region: African States

The Old Towns of Djenné (Arabic: مدن جنة القديمة, romanized: mudun Janna al-qadīma, French: villes anciennes de Djenné) is an archaeological and urban ensemble located in the city of Djenné, in Mali. It comprises four archaeological sites, namely Djenné-Djeno, Hambarkétolo, Kaniana, and Tonomba. In 1988, it was inscribed by the UNESCO on the World Heritage list.

== History ==
Inhabited since 250 B.C., Djenné became a market centre and an important link in the trans-Saharan gold trade. In the 15th and 16th centuries, it was one of the centres for the propagation of Islam. Its traditional houses, of which nearly 2,000 have survived, are built on hillocks (toguere) as protection from the seasonal floods.

== WHS status ==
The Republic of Mali initially submitted a nomination to UNESCO for World Heritage status for Djenné in 1979 but the advisory committee (ICOMOS) observed that the "anarchic urbanization has modified the environment of the most significant complexes" and recommended that any decision be deferred until information on the urban development of the town and the protection of historic sites had been provided by the Malian government.

After a further review, the ICOMOS committee recommended that the nomination should be broadened to include the town of Djenné together with the surrounding archaeological sites of Djenné-Djéno, Hambarketolo, Tonomba and Kaniana. The committee argued that "the definition of a large zone of protection can only help Malian authorities to control urban development and conserve the archaeological reserves and the natural site of the inland delta." The Republic of Mali submitted a broadened nomination which was approved by the UNESCO World Heritage Committee in 1988 as the "Old Towns of Djenné". For the archaeological sites the Committee cited Criterion (iii): "bear a unique or at least exceptional testimony to a cultural tradition or to a civilization which is living or which has disappeared" while for the town they cited Criterion (iv): "be an outstanding example of a type of building, architectural or technological ensemble or landscape which illustrates (a) significant stage(s) in human history".

Beginning in 2005 the reports of the World Heritage Committee included criticism of what the committee considered to be the lack of progress in tackling the problems arising from the conservation status of the town. In its 2005 report, while praising the efforts in restoring the adobe building and improving the sanitation, the Committee commented on the lack of a development plan and requested that the World Heritage Centre, ICOMOS and the ICCROM undertake, in collaboration with the Malian Government a study of alternative solutions to relieve urban development pressure.

The 2006 report produced by the Committee was more critical. It commented that "The inhabitants and the elected officials have the impression of living in a protected area where, in their view, nothing is allowed." and provided a list of issues that it considered to be the consequences of the intense development pressure. These included the lack of respect for building regulations, the inappropriateness of houses with regards to comfortable living areas and family composition, the desire of the population to transform the spatial organisation of the houses using modern materials, the lack of technical and financial resources and competence within the Djenné to resolve the city’s urban development and sanitation problems. The Committee made a number of recommendations including the preparation of a management plan and the production of a map identifying the boundaries of the archaeological sites.

== Sources ==
This article incorporates text from a free content work. Licensed under CC BY-SA IGO 3.0 (license statement/permission). Text taken from Old Towns of Djenné, UNESCO World Heritage Centre.
