= West African forest zone =

In West Africa, the forest zone refers to the southern part of the region once covered by tropical rainforest. Sometimes this region is referred to as Guinea to distinguish it from the grassland-covered Sudan, drier Sahel and per-arid Sahara. It is made-up of vegetation having mainly trees and consist of the following local biotic communities: -mangrove swamp forest (salt and fresh water swamp) -tropical rain forest.

== Extent ==
The forest zone of West Africa, in the strict sense, covers all of Liberia and Sierra Leone, most of Guinea, the southern halves of Côte d'Ivoire and Nigeria, and parts of Ghana, Togo and Guinea-Bissau.

The Dahomey Gap splits the forest zone into two halves by producing an area of much drier climate - Accra receives less than 760 millimetres (30 inches) of rainfall per year - between the wetter regions capable of supporting rainforest. The western forest zone is known as the Upper Guinea forests, and extends from Guinea to western Togo, and the eastern forest zone is known as the Lower Guinea forests, and extends from southeastern Benin through southern Nigeria and into Cameroon.

To the north, as the length for which the region is affected by the Intertropical Convergence Zone declines, the dry season becomes too long to support rainforest except in the wettest areas of the far west. Thus the forest fades out, except on some rivers, north of about 7 N in the east and 9° N in the west.

== Geography ==
Except for the extreme east near Mount Cameroon, the forest zone is entirely with a series of Precambrian cratons and has not been tectonically active in Phanerozoic periods. (It is believed that these cratons came together near the end of the Precambrian). Most of it is flat to undulating lowland, with mountains only on its northern fringe, rising to 1948 metres in the Loma Massif. Many rivers cross the forest zone, with the most important being the Niger and the Volta.

== Climate ==
Being so close to the equator, the forest zone experiences almost no variation in temperatures across the year. The climate is consistently hot, with maxima typically being about 31 °C and minima around 24 °C. In the Fouta Djallon and around Mont Nimba, maxima are about 27 °C but minima can be relatively low at 16 °C.

The major factor governing the climate of the forest zone is rainfall. During the northern summer, a vast area of very low pressure centred on India extends a trough across the region. This trough reaches its most northerly position between July and September driving extremely moist westerly winds onto the coast from the Atlantic and producing extremely heavy rain of as much as thirty inches per month in lowland sites in Guinea, Sierra Leone and Liberia. As this trough moves north and south, it creates two rainy seasons on the extreme southern coast: a heavy one between May and July and a lighter one in October and November.

During the northern winter, an anticyclone develops over the Sahara and drives dry northeasterly winds over the region, creating a dry season except in the extreme southeast (where the monsoonal low over Southern Africa has the unusual effect of producing westerly winds on its northern flank north of the equator). This effect is sufficiently widespread that the driest months of January and February are not totally dry on the coast as they are further inland (though average rainfall is typically only 1 inch per month even in Abidjan).

Total annual rainfall decreases with distance from the coast and is also heavily influenced by the aspect of the coastline. In the wettest areas of Guinea, Sierra Leone and Liberia, average annual rainfall ranges from 3000 to 5000 millimetres (120 to 200 inches), whilst in Abidjan it is about 2050 millimetres (81 inches), in Lagos 1800 millimetres (71 inches) and about 1400 millimetres (55 inches) at the northern edge of the forest.

== Land use and demographics ==
In the eastern part of the forest zone, because of the influence of Mount Cameroon, soils are often fertile and there are large areas of subsistence farming. Major crops include millet, yams and rice, whilst plantation agriculture is extensive on the best soils, producing chiefly cocoa. Further west, due to the ancient geology of the region, soils are much less fertile and farming becomes chiefly confined to the raising of perennial crops, with cocoa remaining pre-eminent. Forestry, however, has devastated much of the natural rainforest in countries such as Côte d'Ivoire and Liberia, and farmers without land have been pushed onto land with soil very marginal for agriculture by population growth, which, despite frequent warfare, continues to be among the highest in the world.

The eastern part of the forest zone is one of the most heavily populated parts of Africa, largely owing to its abundant and highly reliable rainfall and the fertile alluvial soils. Whilst this region contains numerous large cities, the most important being Lagos, Ibadan and Port Harcourt, both of which have grown into mega-cities since the 1970s, the majority of its population remains rural and dependent upon subsistence farming. Major ethnic groups include the Igbo and Yoruba. The western part is less populated but is similar demographically to the east, with numerous African tribes predominating. The major cities here are Abidjan and Conakry.

== Flora, fauna and conservation ==
Because of its history of glacial epochs, and also the strong seasonality of rainfall, the West African forest zone is not nearly so rich in plant species as other tropical forest areas. There are, however, many species unique to the area, and numerous valuable plants native to the region, including such timber trees as iroko (Chlorophora excelsa).

The fauna includes many endemic mammal species, most of which are now highly endangered because of deforestation. The most famous is the pygmy hippopotamus (Hexaprotodon liberiensis), whilst the royal antelope (Neotragus pygmaeus) is one of the smallest hoofed mammals in the world and is remarkable for its ability to leap up to ten times its body size.

Though many national parks and strict nature reserves exist to protect what remains of the forests in this region, most of them exist only on paper because of lack of finance. Thus, the future of the forests of this region is in grave doubt.
