= Jambukhu =

Jambukhu (also spelled Diambokho, Dyambukhu, Diambougou, or Jambuxu) is a historical region in western Mali. It borders Diafunu to the north, Guidimakha to the west, Kaarta and Tiringa to the east, and the Senegal River to the south.

== History ==
Dyambokho is named after the Dyambo clan, rulers of the area during the Wagadu period, along with the Bidanessi. As the Wagadu Empire was collapsing, the Bathily clan moved into the region. Samba Yaate Jagolla, chief of Senghelu, allied with the Bidanessi to keep the newcomers contained in Tiringa. Eventually Maxan Jabise Jaguraga arrived from Wagadu proper and allied with the Bathily to defeat him. At the time, the capital of Jambukhu was at Kandia.

In the mid 18th century Guimba Kinty, king of Khasso (1737-1757), established his capital at Koniakary, and Jambukhu became the heartland of his kingdom, the most powerful state on the upper Senegal at the time. The second half of the century saw constant conflict between Khasso and its eastern neighbor, Kaarta. The throne alternated between different branches of the Khassonke ruling family, with Jambukhu falling under the Dembaya line. In 1796 this arrangement broke out into a civil war, however, and in 1800 Moussoukro Bo, king of Kaarta, sacked Koniakary and occupied Jambukhu.

In 1854 the Toucouleur Empire took control of the right bank of the upper Senegal, and El Hajj Umar Tall built an important tata in Koniakary to defend Jambukhu from encroachment by the French and their allies. Toucouleur domination was heavy, however, and the Khassonke ruling classes quickly rebelled. Thierno Jibi, the local Toucouleur commander, defeated the rebels in Jambukhu and re-established control in 1856, but the Khassonke statelets of the left bank were able to preserve their independence under French protection. A devastating famine hit the region in these years as well. Moriba, chief of Sero, remained loyal and became the most important local leader in Jambukhu in the 1860s.

In the 1870s Tall's successor Ahmadu Tall placed his brother Bassirou Tall in charge in Koniakary, where he clashed with Moriba. Sero rebelled in 1874, supported by Diafunu, and met with success initially but was eventually sacked by Muntaga Tall, the Toucouleur faama of Nioro.

In December 1890, a French column took Koniakary on the way to conquering Nioro, ending Toucouleur hegemony in the area and integrating it into French Sudan.

== See also ==
- Marena Diombougou
