= Nioro Region =

Nioro
- Region
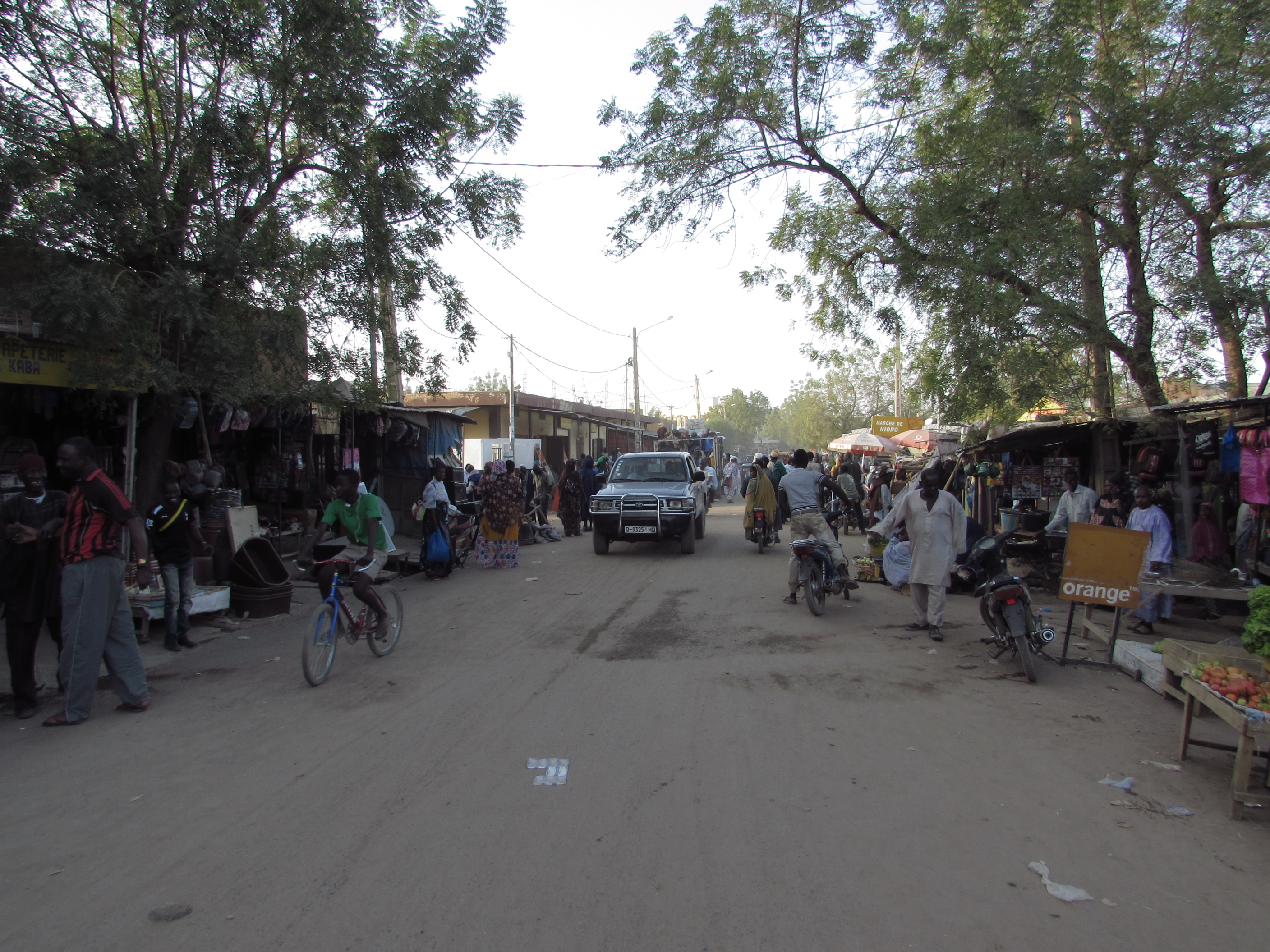
- Street in Nioro du Sahel

- Location of Nioro Region in Mali
- Interactive map of Nioro
- Coordinates: 15.230833°N 9.591389°W
- Country: Mali
- Capital: Nioro du Sahel

Area
  - Total: 23,350 km^{2} (9,020 sq mi)

Population (2023)
  - Total: 668,831
  - Density: 28.64/km^{2} (74.19/sq mi)

Nioro Region is an administrative region in western Mali. It was created from parts of the former Kayes Region and has its capital at Nioro du Sahel. The region lies on the border with Mauritania and includes parts of the historical areas of Kaarta and Kingui.

== Geography ==
Nioro Region is located in western Mali, north-east of the city of Kayes and borders Mauritania. It covers an area of 23,350 km². The climate is dry; rainfall occurs mainly during the short rainy season. Annual precipitation in the area ranges roughly between 200 and 500 mm and is concentrated in a few months of the year. The vegetation is accordingly characterised by dry shrubland, grassland and agricultural land.

== History ==
Administratively, the area long belonged to Kayes Region after Mali’s independence. The creation of a separate Nioro Region had already been envisaged in the administrative reform of 2012, but was implemented in the new territorial division only with Law No. 2023-006 of 13 March 2023 on the creation of new administrative regions in the Republic of Mali.

== Administrative divisions ==
The region is divided into six cercles.

Cercle code	Cercle	Communes
1101	Nioro du Sahel	10
1102	Diéma	5
1103	Diangounté Camara	4
1104	Sandaré	3
1105	Troungoumbé	5
1106	Béma	4

== Population ==
In 2023, the region had a population of 668,831. The population is ethnically diverse. The main population groups include Soninke, Peul/Fulbe, Bambara and Moorish groups. Islam is the predominant religion practiced by 99.7% of the population; Nioro du Sahel has importance as a religious centre of Hamallism.

Year	Population
1998	307,613
2009	440,698
2023	668,831

Ethnicity in Nioro (2022)
1. Soninke (43.5%)
2. Fula (25.3%)
3. Bambara (18.0%)
4. Arab (6.45%)
5. Khassonké (2.50%)
6. Malinké (1.67%)
7. Kakolo (0.97%)
8. Other (1.70%)
Mother tongues in Nioro region (2022 census)
1. Maraka / Soninké (43.49%)
2. Fula (24.62%)
3. Bambara (20.59%)
4. Maure (5.73%)
5. Kassonké (2.59%)
6. Malinke (1.19%)
7. Other Malian (1.53%)
8. Other African (0.02%)
9. Other foreign (0.24%)

== Economy ==
The economy of the region is predominantly rural. Rain-fed farming, livestock raising and local trade play an important role. Because of its location in the Sahel, agricultural production is strongly dependent on rainfall; dry periods and irregular rainy seasons directly affect harvests, pastureland and water availability. In the area around Nioro du Sahel, livestock farming has traditionally been of great importance, with cattle, sheep and goats serving both local supply and regional trade. The town of Nioro du Sahel functions as the administrative, market and transport centre for the surrounding area.
