= Tambacara =

- Town
- Location in Mali
- Coordinates: 15°04′12″N 10°50′18″W
- Country: Mali
- Region: Kayes Region
- Cercle: Yélimané Cercle
- Commune: Diafounou Tambacara
- Time zone: UTC+0 (GMT)

Tambacara or Tambakara is a small town and principal settlement of the Diafounou Tambacara commune of Diafounou Tambacara, in the Cercle of Yélimané in the Kayes Region of south-western Mali, near the border of Mauritania.

== History ==
Tambacara is one of the traditional capitals of the Diafunu region, along with the nearby rival village of Gory. It was founded by the Dukure clan from Wagadu in the 12th century.

El Hajj Umar Tall captured Diafunu from Kaarta in 1854, installing talibes in Tambacara and Gory to educate the locals on Islam. In 1866, after Tall's death, his son and successor Ahmadu Tall placed his brother Nuru in charge of the territory, based in Tambacara. Diafunu soon rebelled against the Toucouleur, however, supporting Sero Diamanou in their rebellion against Muntaga Tall, the Toucouleur governor of Nioro.
