= Diafounou =

Diafounou Jafunu
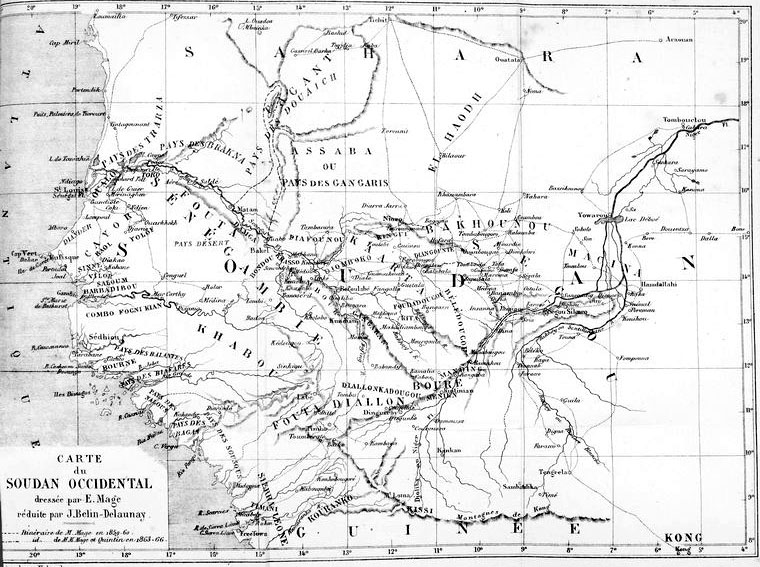
- An 1872 map of the Western Sudan, with Diafunu in the center
- Capital: Tambacara and Gory
- Common languages: Soninke
- Demonym: Diafununke
- History
  - Arrival of the Dukure clan: 12th century
  - Incorporation into French Sudan: 1890

Diafounou, also spelled Diafunu, Zafunu, or Dyahunu, is a historical region and former Soninke dyamare centered around the upper Kolinbiné River in what is now the Kayes Region of western Mali.

== Name ==
The name 'Diafunu' means "people of Dia". It first appears in the written record in the work of Al-Bakri (1068) and is mentioned regularly by other Arabic authors, with various spellings.

== History ==
=== Founding ===
The earliest inhabitants of Diafunu were the Djikine clan. According to legend, they descend from Sirman-méssané, son of Dinga and his second wife, Assakule.

In the 12th century, Diafunu saw a massive influx of immigrants leaving Wagadu (the Ghana Empire). The most powerful of these was the Dukure clan, whose two branches founded the villages of Tambacara and Gory. The old capital of the area, Sain Demba, was destroyed. The two Dukure branches initially agreed that the oldest male would rule as tunka (king), but this arrangement quickly broke down. Instead they split Diafunu into upper and lowers parts, ruled respectively from Tambacara and Gory, with overall kingship going to the eldest male of the whole clan.

=== Regional Power? ===
Yaqut al-Hamawi, writing in the 1220s, describes Diafunu as a powerful kingdom. The king passed through Marrakesh on a pilgrimage, and the scene showcases the relative power of the Diafunu monarch over his Almoravid host:

"The king of Zafun(u) is more powerful and more versed in the art of ruling than [other West African princes]. And this is the reason for which the [people of] the Veil Wearers [meaning, the Almoravids] recognize his superiority, by demonstrating to him their obedience and turning to him [in order to obtain his aid] in case of important affairs of state. One year, while going on pilgrimage to Mecca, this king arrived to the Maghreb, in the realm of the Veil Wearer al-Lamtuni, "prince of the Muslims". The latter greeted the king on foot while the king of Zafanu did not dismount from his horse [to greet him]"

This image of a powerful regional power, however, does not match the local Soninke oral traditions. It is possible that this reference is actually to the Kingdom of Diarra or to Wagadu itself.

=== Tributary State ===
In any case Diafunu's power was ephemeral, dissipating by the 1150s. The old capital, Sain Demba, was destroyed in the wars accompanying the fall of Wagadu. Diafunu supported Soumaoro Kante and the Sosso Empire against Sundiata Keita and the rising Mali Empire, and was conquered. It was one of the main provinces of Mali in the 14th century.

Information about Diafunu in the following centuries is sparse. It was raided by the Moroccan Orman and the Moors, and warred with neighboring Khasso. The region was a tributary to Kaarta from approximately 1774 to 1854, ruled by a governor based in Yelimane.

=== The Toucouleur Period ===
In 1854, El Hajj Umar Tall took Yelimane and broke Kaartanke power in the region, with the men of Gory playing a key role in the battle. After Tall's death, his successor Ahmadu placed some of his brothers in important positions, with Muntaga Tall running the entire region from Nioro, Bassirou Tall under him in Koniakary, and Nuru Tall put in charge of Diafunu itself in 1874. Nuru's capricious and violent rule quickly turned the Diafununke against him, however.

When Moriba, king of Sero, rebelled against the Toucouleur, Diafunu rose in support. Nuru was forced to seek help from his brother Bassirou. At the first battle of Tambacara the Toucouleur were defeated, but they turned to Mountaga in Nioro who by 1875 forced Moriba's surrender. Bassirou was unwilling to accept the rebel's return to the fold, however, and the two men's dispute quickly escalated into a return to war. Sero was put under siege, but relieved by reinforcements from Diafunu. Once again, Mountaga marched from Nioro and took the town, but his victory was cut short when Moriba and the Doucoure ambushed and pillaged the Toucouleur baggage train. Six months later, Mountaga returned and killed Moriba at the second battle of Tambacara, sacking the town and ending the rebellion.

In 1885 Diafunu again rose against the Toucouleur, inspired by the pan-Soninke appeal of Mahmadu Lamine Drame. Drame's son Souaiybou based himself in Gory, where he was besieged by Ahmadu for three months. The town fell in March 1887, and Souaiybou was eventually caught and killed.

=== Colonial Domination ===
The Diafununke eventually began looking to the advancing French colonial armies for protection from the Toucouleur. In December 1890, a French column took Koniakary and Yelimane, on the way to conquering Nioro and ending Toucouleur hegemony in the area. The almamy of Diafunu was named a chef de canton in 1918.

== Economy ==
Diafunu was a vital crossroads of trade routes for salt, slaves, gold, horses, and other merchandise from the 10th to 12th centuries CE, attracting merchants from as far as Sijilmasa and Ghadames.
