= Samba Ndiaye =

Soninke military engineer

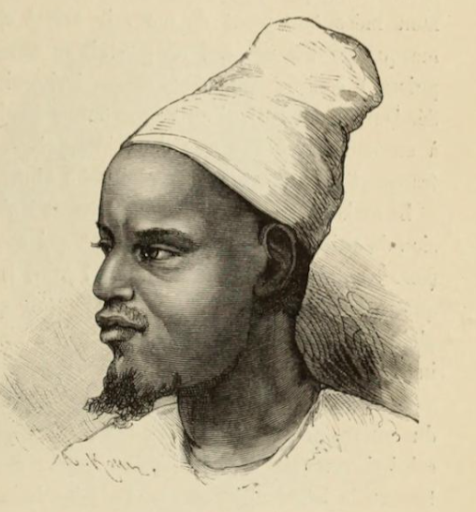
- Born: c. 1810; Tyabou, Gajaaga
- Died: c. 1890; Segou
- Military career
- Allegiance: Toucouleur Army

Samba Ndiaye was the chief military engineer of the Toucouleur Empire, as well as an artillery officer and diplomat. He was responsible for the construction of tatas in what is now modern-day Mali, including the defenses of Segou Sikoro, Koundian, Dyala, Nyamina and Nioro du Sahel. He also played a role in repairing captured French artillery.

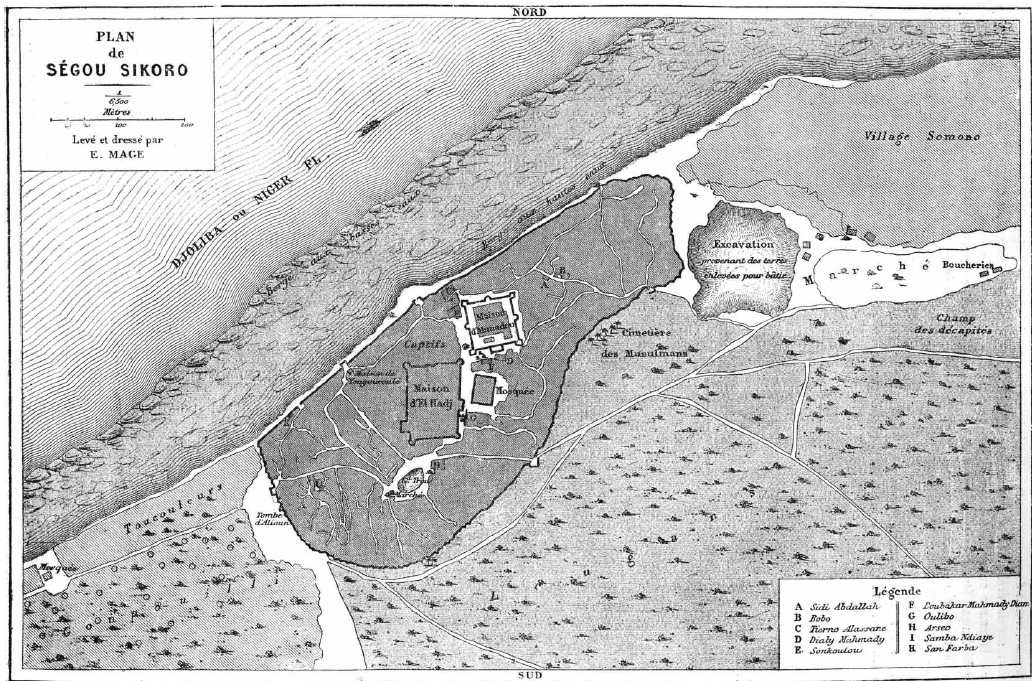
A map of Segou Sikoro in the 1860s, showing the defenses constructed by Ndiaye.

== Life ==
Samba Ndiaye was born in Tiyabu, Gajaaga, the son of a Bathily father and an Ndiaye mother around 1810. In 1825 he was taken as a hostage to Saint Louis, where he lived for over a decade, learning to speak French and Wolof. He was not educated, but apprenticed to a mason. Upon his return to the upper Senegal River valley, he became a merchant, then in 1855 joined El Hajj Oumar Tall's growing movement. Familiar with European methods, he became commander of Tall's artillery, then later the chief military engineer for fortifications.

After El Hajj Oumar Tall's death in 1864, Ndiaye served his son Ahmadu Tall as a diplomat, specializing in relations with European powers. In particular he accompanied Paul Soleillet during his time in Segou.

Ndiaye died in Segou of an illness shortly after Ahmadu was forced into exile and the city taken by the French.
