= Gory, Mali =

Gory Gori
- Commune and small town
- Location in Mali
- Coordinates: 15°6′32″N 10°45′29″W
- Country: Mali
- Region: Kayes Region
- Cercle: Yélimané Cercle

Population (2009 census)
  - Total: 10,760
- Time zone: UTC+0 (GMT)

Gory is a rural commune and small town in the Cercle of Yélimané in the Kayes Region of western Mali, near the border of Mauritania. The commune contains the following ten villages: Biladjimi, Chiguegué, Darsalam, Foungou, Gory, Gory Banda, Mongoro, Sabouciré, Sambancanou and Takoutallah. In the 2009 census the commune had a population of 10,760. The town of Gory is 25 km west of the town of Yélimané.

== History ==
Gory is one of the historical capitals of the Diafunu region, along with nearby Tambacara. It was founded c. 1206 by the Soninke Dukure clan coming from Wagadu. Gory and Tambacara are traditional rivals for leadership of Diafunu.

The men of Gory played a key role in El Hajj Umar Tall's capture of Yelimane in 1854. In 1885, however, the village led Diafunu in a rebellion against his successor Ahmadu Tall in favor of the Soninke marabout Mamadou Lamine Drame. Drame's son Souaiybou was based in Gory. Threatened by Ahmadu's forces in nearby Nioro, Gory built a tata in anticipation of a siege, which began on December 18th 1886. Over three months, the defenders sortied repeatedly and negotiations dragged on. Finally in March 1888 the defenders abandoned the town and scattered into the bush. The Toucouleurs eventually caught up to Souaiybou at Gouthioube and executed him. The French would later claim credit for killing the young man.

On May 12th 1887, while still at Gory, Ahmadu signed a protectorate treaty with the French.
