= Mourgoula =

Mouroula
- village
- Location in Mali
- Coordinates: 12°38′0″N 9°10′29″W
- Country: Mali
- Region: Kayes Region
- Cercle: Kita Cercle
- Communes of Mali: Sirakoro
- Time zone: UTC+0 (GMT)

Mourgoula is a village in the Sirakoro commune of Kayes Region in Mali. It was the site of an important tata under the Toucouleur Empire that protected the core of the state from French encroachment, along with those of Koniakary, Koundian, and Saboucire.

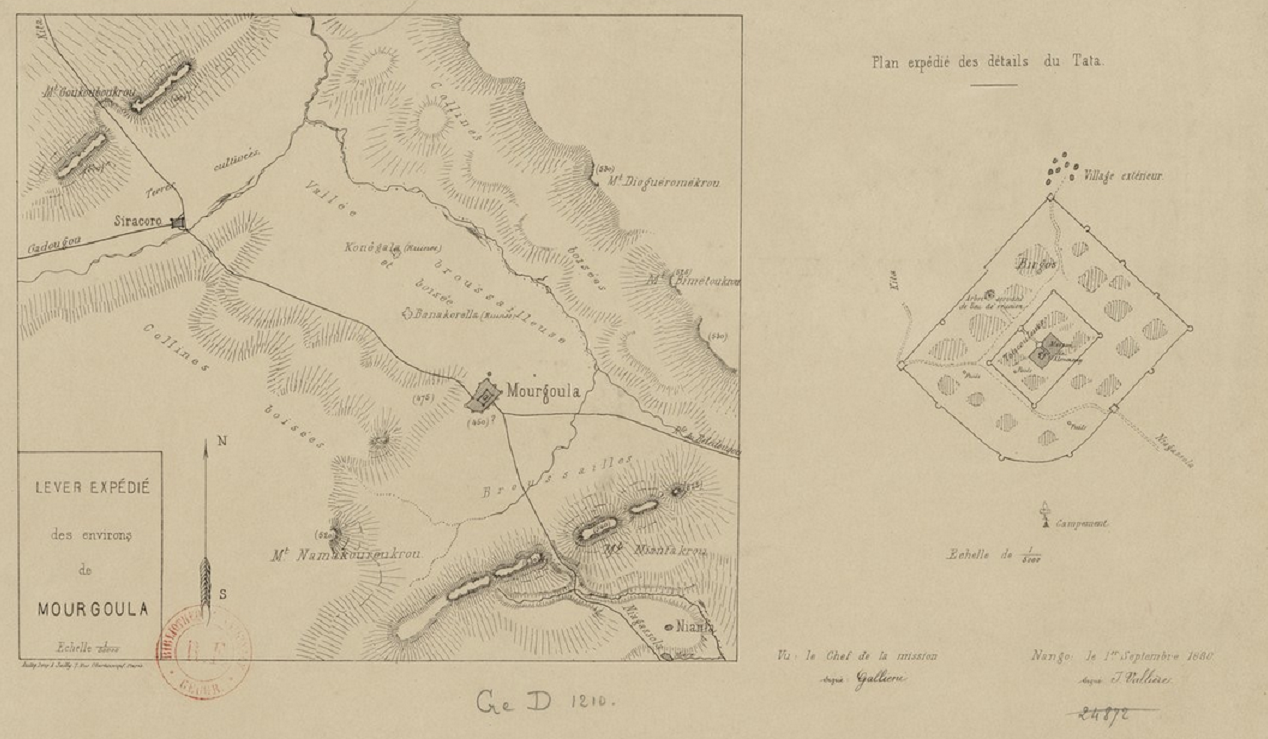
Map of Mourgoula fortress in 1880

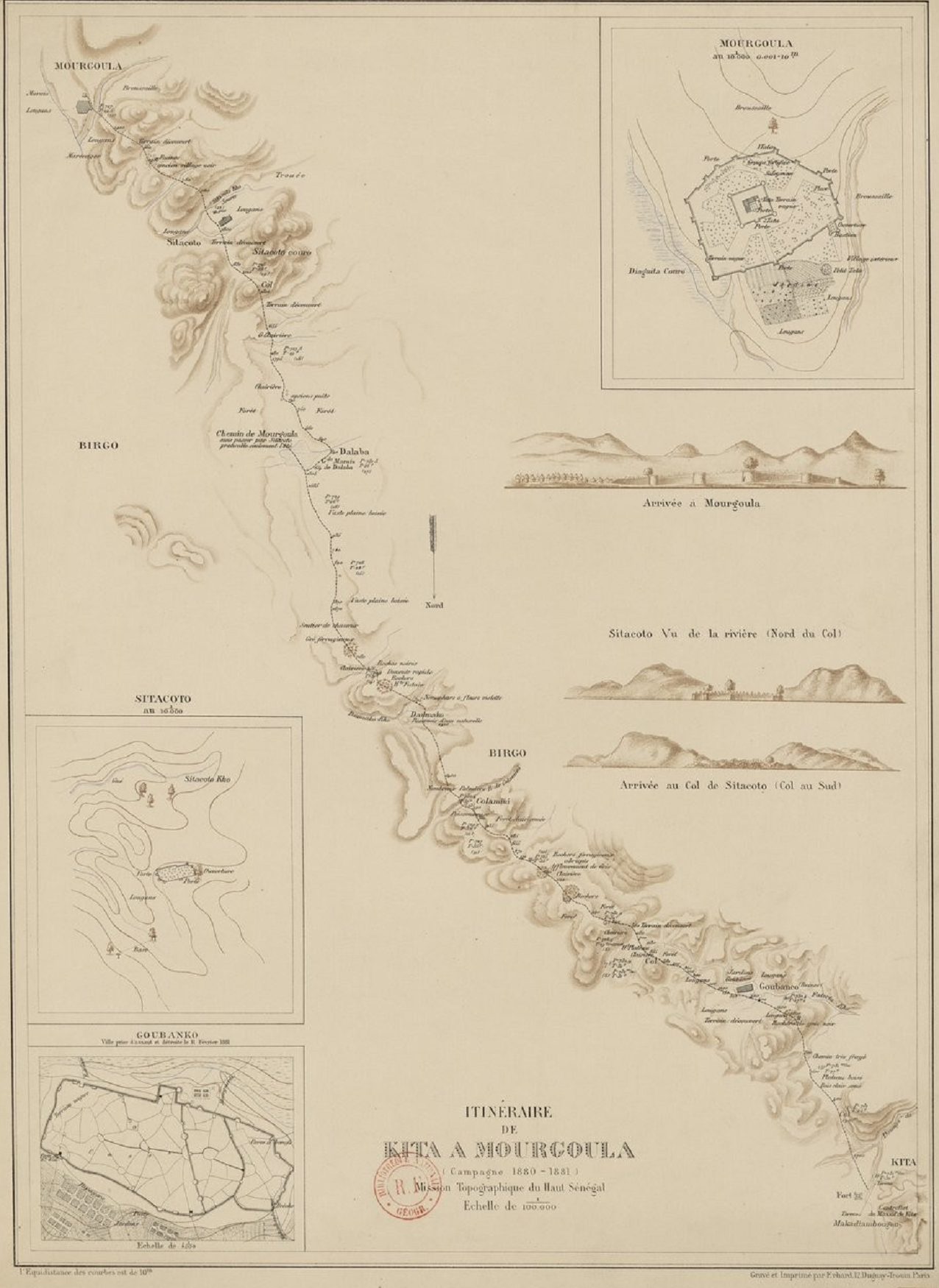
The route from Mourgoula to Kita in 1882.

The tata was commanded by Almamy Abdallah, who used it as a base to harass caravans trading with the French and plan an attack on the fort at Kita. On December 22, 1992, colonel Gustave Borgnis-Desbordes forced him to abandon his undermanned and crumbling fortress, and razed it, thereby formalizing the French protectorate of the Birgo region.
