= Koniakary Tata =

Historic fortification in Mali

- Koniakary in Mali
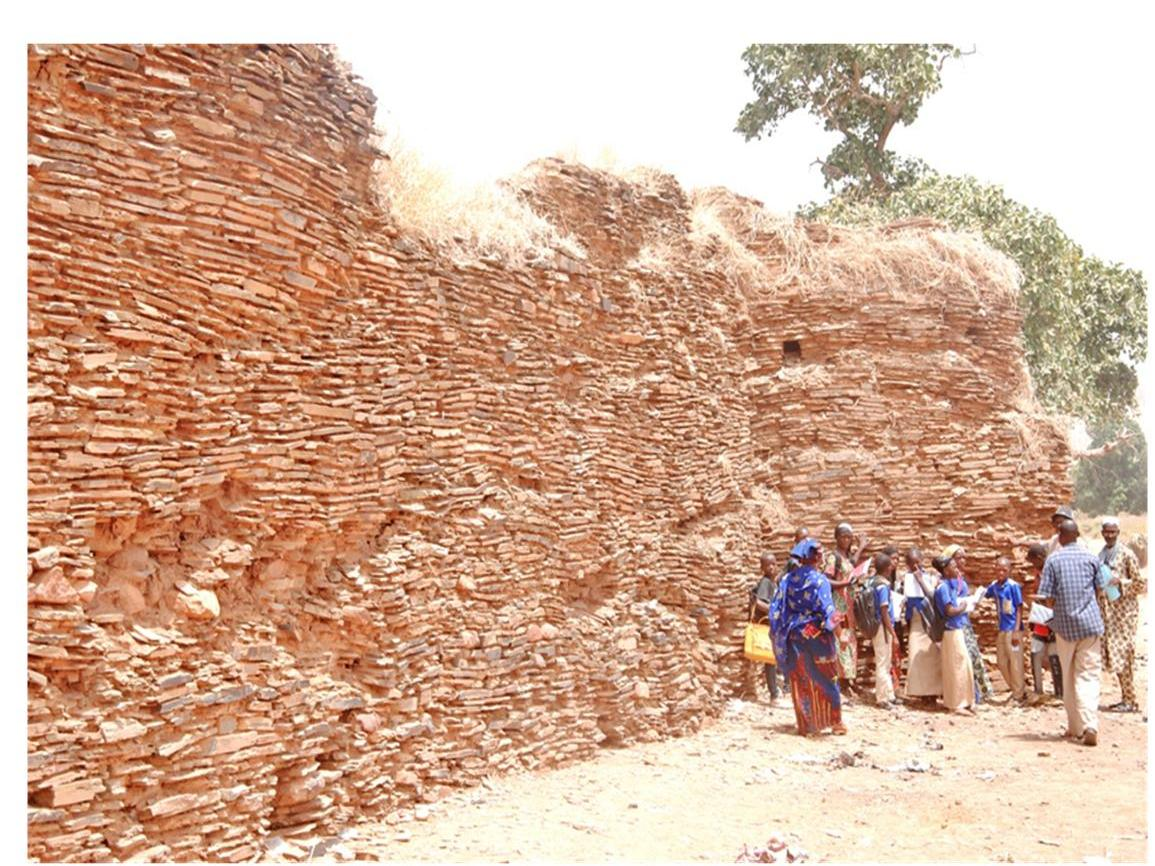

Site information
- Type: Tata (fortification)

Location
- Coordinates: 14°34′51″N 10°53′57″W

Site history
- Built: 1855
- In use: Toucouleur Empire

The tata of Koniakary is a tata built in the commune of Koniakary, 70 km (43 mi) from Kayes in Mali. It was constructed beginning in 1854 by Buna Ndiaye, an engineer serving under El Hadj Oumar Tall, though it is sometimes mistakenly credited to Samba Ndiaye. Inaugurated in January 1857, its goal was to defend the province of Jambukhu against colonial troops and their allies.

== Presentation ==
The tata had a rectangular form 115 metres (377 ft) long by 107 metres (351 ft) wide. It measured 6 metres (20 ft) high with a thickness at the base of 2 metres (6 ft 7 in).

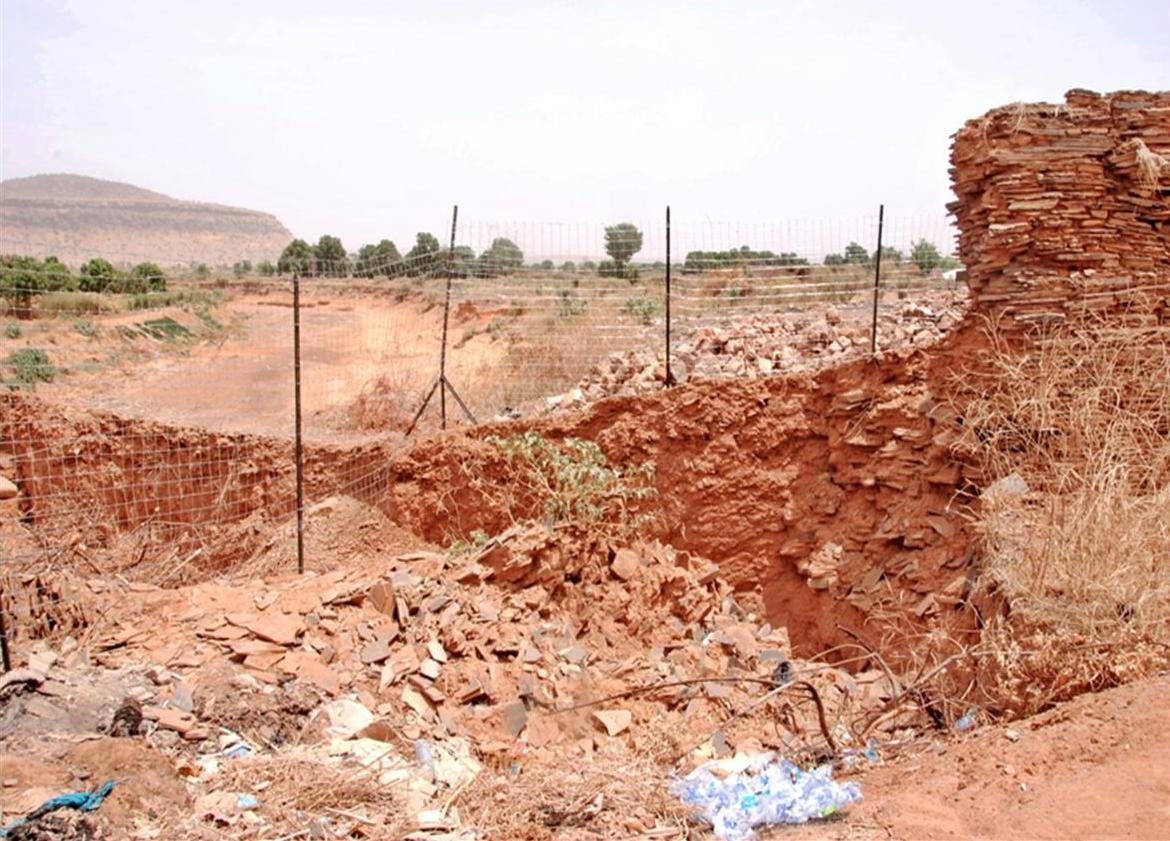
A Tata wall on the brink of ruin, photographed in 2019

The tata, with its eight towers, was built in flat stone, which was quarried 2.5 km (1.6 mi) from the site.

The French expedition to take Nioro du Sahel left after the destruction of the Koniakary tata by colonel Louis Archinard, June 15, 1890.

November 14, 2011 the Council of Ministers of Mali adopted a decree to classify the Koniakary tata as part of the national cultural patrimony of Mali.

The remains of the defensive wall are still visible today.

== See also ==
- Toucouleur Empire
