= Nioro Airport =

Airport in Mali

Nioro Airport Aéroport de Nioro
- IATA: NIX; ICAO: GANR

Summary
- Airport type: Public
- Serves: Nioro du Sahel
- Elevation AMSL: 778 ft (237 m)
- Coordinates: 15°14′20″N 9°34′35″W

Map
- Location of the airport in Mali

Runways
Direction	Length		Surface
Direction	ft	m	Surface
08/26	5,360	1,634	Asphalt
- Source: Google Maps

Nioro Airport (IATA: NIX, ICAO: GANR) (French: Aéroport Nioro) is an airport serving Nioro du Sahel in the Kayes Region of western Mali.

== See also ==
- Transport in Mali
