= Ahmadu Tall =

Ahmadu Sekou Tall
- Khalifa, Faama, Amir al-Mu'minin
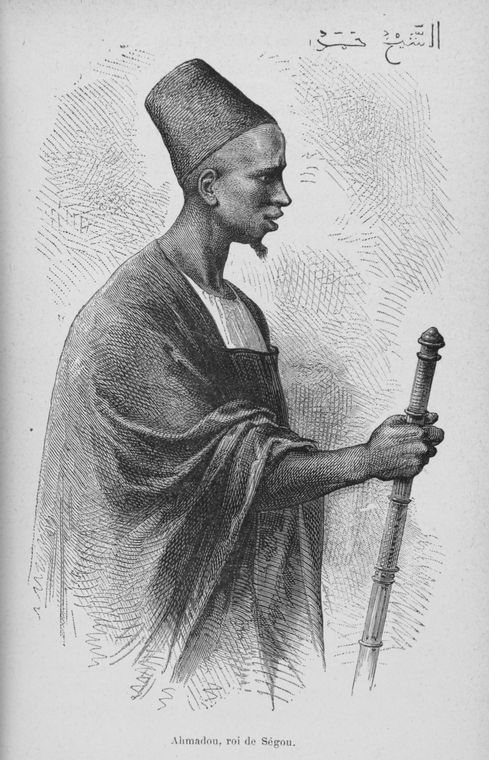
- Ahmadu Tall c. 1880
- Reign: 1864-1893
- Predecessor: Omar Saidou Tall
- Born: June 21, 1836; Sokoto Caliphate
- Died: 15 December 1897 (aged 61); Sokoto
- Father: Omar Saidou Tall
- Mother: Aisha
- Religion: Islam

Ahmad al-Madani al-Kabir at-Tijani, commonly known as Ahmadou Sekou Tall or Ahmadu Sekou (June 21, 1836 – December 15, 1897) was the Laamdo Dioulbé (ruler) of the Toucouleur Empire from 1864 to 1893 and Faama of Ségou from 1864 to 1884. He led one of the largest states in West Africa at the time, and resisted French colonial encroachment both diplomatically and militarily for decades.

== Early life ==
Ahmadu was born in 1836, during his father El Hadj Umar Tall's stay in the Sokoto Caliphate. His mother was a Hausa slave named Aisha. Although he was the oldest of Umar Tall's sons, many of his brothers looked down on Ahmadu due to his mother's low social status. He lived with his father and numerous half-brothers in Dinguiraye before the jihad was launched in 1852.

In 1859, Umar Tall officially named Ahmadu Amir al-Muminin, Commander of the Faithful, Laamdo Dioulbé in Fula. He conquered Ségou (then the heart of the Bambara Empire) on March 10, 1861. Not long afterwards, he began his conquest of the Fula empire of Massina, leaving Ahmadu as the Almami of Ségou.

== Rule ==
Umar Tall died in 1864 attempting to suppress a rebellion in Massina. Besides naming Ahmadu as his successor, he had done little to prepare him or any of his other sons to rule. Born of mothers from widely varying social and cultural backgrounds, Tall's sons were physically and emotionally distant from each other and looked to their own personal interests after his death.

After Umar Tall's death, the Toucouleur Empire was never able to function as a coherent whole. While Ahmadu's overall position at the head of the empire was widely acknowledged, he did not have any de facto of many areas nominally under his suzerainty. He ruled directly in Segou, but his cousin Tidiani Tall ran a functionally independent quasi-state based in Bandiagara, Habibou Tall ruled Dinguiraye, and Mokhtar Tall was in charge of Kaarta.

=== Confronting Rebellion ===
After 1865, Beledougou was in a permanent state of revolt, frequently armed and supported by the French. Habibou and Mokhtar rebelled in 1869, and Mokhtar was captured but then freed in a prisoner exchange in 1873. After another year of campaigning Ahmadu was able to capture re-capture both brothers and imprison them in Segou. In 1872, his forces also killed the Bambara rebel leader Boussefi in 1871 and captured an important fortress, Guemoukoura, a year later in a battle. During Ahmadu's absence, his half-brother Aguibu served as regent in Segou.

After defeating the rebels, Ahmadu reorganized the administration of the empire, but continued to rely on his half-brothers. In 1874 Muntaga Tall was made Faama of Nioro, Bassirou Tall served under him as the governor of Jambukhu based in Koniakary, and Nuru Tall was put in charge of Diafunu. In 1878 the popular Aguibou was sidelined by sending him to Dinguiraye, although Ahmadu kept some of his wives as hostages in Segou to guarantee good conduct, an insult that would play a part in Aguibou switching sides to support the French. He appointed counselors to rule alongside the provincial governors and keep an eye on them. In theory each governor was required to come to Segou every year to report on their activities, but this was poorly enforced due to the rebellions in the countryside. Faced with numerous actual and possible rebellions, Ahmadu cultivated a base of support among the Bambara natives of Segou. He relied more on his favorites than the zealous talibes who had served his father, although he maintained the latters' privileges in order to prevent them joining one of his rivals.

=== First Conflict with the French ===
By the late 1870s, Ahmadu had re-established his control over Kaarta and stabilized the situation in the Niger valley. Toucouleur power was growing, and their influence was felt once again along the upper Senegal. The French, worried that their burgeoning colonial empire was threatened, attacked. In September 1878 Governor Louis Briere de l'Isle ordered an attack on the Toucouleur ally of Logo, capturing and destroying Saboucire. This disaster crippled Toucouleur prestige in the upper valley, and the local Malinke made overtures to the French for their protection. This left the Toucouleur fortresses at Koundian and Mourgoula dangerously isolated and impotent.

In February 1880, Joseph Gallieni was sent on a diplomatic mission in an attempt to mollify Ahmadu and buy the French time to push their influence to the Niger and cripple the empire. On his way to Segou, he made contact with the Beledougou rebels and signed a treaty with the chief of Kita to build a fort there. Upon his arrival, Ahmadu kept him waiting in Nango, 40km from Segou, while he convinced him that British influence was growing. The resulting Treaty of Nango was a major diplomatic victory for the Toucouleur - the French were given trade rights and allowed to maintain their post at Bafoulabe, but recognized the empire's borders and any future conquests, guaranteed communication with the recruiting grounds in Futa Toro, and promised field guns and a regular supply of rifles and ammunition. Unfortunately for the Toucouleur, the French had no intention of ever honoring this treaty, and it as never ratified by the government. In December 1882, in their first direct act of war between the two empires, Colonel Borgnis-Desbordes captured and destroyed the tata of Mourgala.

=== In Nioro ===
In 1885, Muntaga rebelled in turn, encouraged by overtures from the French. Ahmadu returned to Kaarta and laid a long and grueling siege of Nioro. Rather than surrender, Muntaga committed suicide by blowing up his powder magazine. Ahmadu remained in Nioro after 1884, In theory, Ahmadu's position in Nioro could enable him to better monitor and restrict French activities, but he was cut off from his heartland around Segou by the rebels of Beledougou and needed weapons and munitions in order to suppress them.

As Ahmadu was clearing up the last remnanet of Muntaga's rebellion, the Soninke marabout Mamadou Lamine Drame was emerging onto the political scene. Many Soninke communities flocked to his banner, and his son Souaiybou set a base in Gory, a capital of Diafunu. Ahmadu marched his army out of Nioro in August 1886, camping in Kirane to gather troops and attempt to negotiate Souaiybou's peaceful withdrawal. But this came to nothing, and Gory built a tata in anticipation of a siege, which began on December 18th 1886. Over three months, the defenders sortied repeatedly and negotiations dragged on. Finally in March 1888 the defenders abandoned the town and scattered into the bush, where they were hunted by the Toucouleurs. Souaiybou fled, but was eventually caught and executed at Gouthioube, with both the French and Toucouleur claiming responsibility.

Gallieni returned to the Sudan as commander of the Upper Senegal in October 1886, eager to collaborate with Ahmadu in order to have a free hand against Mahmadu Lamine. Having seen their disregard for the Treaty of Nango, Ahmadu was in no hurry to appease them. In April 1887 Gallieni tried again, sending Ahmadu a draft treaty already signed. To his surprise, it was returned on May 12th affixed with the Faama's official seal. This Treaty of Gory made the Toucouleur Empire a nominal protectorate of France and resumed arms sales but was in reality only a delaying tactic which neither party expected to last. Still, Ahmadu scored a diplomatic coup by having the French protect Toucouleur officials sent into the provinces to announce the new treaty of friendship, damaging France's standing among their erstwhile allies, the Bambara rebels in Beledougou.

Gallieni's successor Louis Archinard was uninterested even in insincere diplomacy. In February 1889, acting on his own initiative, he seized Koundian. A year later Ségou fell to the colonizers. The forces of Madani, Ahmadu's son, were decimated by French artillery and prevented even from manning the city walls. Toucouleur fortresses of Ouessebougou and Koniakary fell soon after. Ahmadu, initially incapable of responding due to lack of provisions and fear of an attack from Beledougou, stockpiled food and weapons and allied himself with Alboury Ndiaye of Jolof, Abdul Bokar Kan, and Samory Toure.

Toucouleur forces engaged in a guerilla campaign in Jambukhu to prevent the French from moving beyond Koniakary, but an attempt to recapture the fortress in September 1890 ended in disaster. The French moved on Nioro in December, dispersing Bassirou Tall's contingent at Niogomera with heavy artillery on the 23rd. The city was evacuated shortler afterwards. Ahmadu's army, led by his Wolof ally Alboury Ndiaye, attempted one last stand at Youri on January 3rd 1891, but were mown down by the French machine guns.

=== In Bandiagara ===
After the fall of Nioro, Ahmadu moved to Bandiagara, forcing his younger brother Mounirou to give up power there. The Bambara of the Segou region, including those who had fought against Ahmadu for decades, were now chafing under the domination of the French and their allies such as Mademba Sy. The one-time enemies now collaborated against the foreign threat, and in March 1892 jointly besieged Sansanding.

Archinard reacted first by taking Djenne, which was brutally bombarded for refusing to renounce Ahmadu, then Mopti. The Toucouleur defensive line at Kori-Kori on the plateau was broken, and the city of Bandiagara fell on April 29th. On May 4th, Ahmadu's brother Aguibou was installed as the puppet Sultan of Massina.

== Exile ==
Despite being forced to flee Bandiagara, Ahmadu refused Archinard's offer of a comfortable retirement. He and Ndiaye fell back eastwards to modern-day Niger, where Ndiaye was killed. Ahmadu reached Sokoto, now in present-day Nigeria, and settled at Maykouki where he died in 1897.

== Personality ==
Ahmadu Tall was an enlightened and wise ruler, who treated French diplomats courteously, but did not possess the same charisma as his father. The historical traditions of Diafunu remember him as very calm, sober, pensive, and ascetic.

== Legacy ==
Ahmadu and his father are controversial figures in West Africa today; they built a powerful empire and resisted colonial encroachment, but were themselves imperialists imposing the rule of a Toucouleur minority on an often unwilling local population. Therefore, they have not become inspirational figures for post-colonial state building in the way that the Sekou Toure regime promoted Samory Toure. Ahmadu kept the empire together as a regional power, despite constant challenges and rebellions, for nearly 30 years. Although he was a Toucouleur, he has been remembered fondly by the Bambara of Segou over whom he ruled.

Ahmadu's son Muntaga joined forces with Samory Toure after the fall of Segou and served with him until his capture in 1898. In 1905 he was allowed to return to the city, where he became a prominent community leader.

Preceded by El Hajj Umar Tall	Faama of Ségou; 1864 - 1884	Succeeded by Madani Ahmadu Tall
Preceded by Muntaga Tall	Faama of Nioro; 1884 - 1890	Succeeded by French West Africa
Preceded by Mounirou Tall	Faama of Masina; 1890 - 1892	Succeeded by Aguibou Tall
