= Saad Buh =

Mauritanian Qadiriyyah Sufi

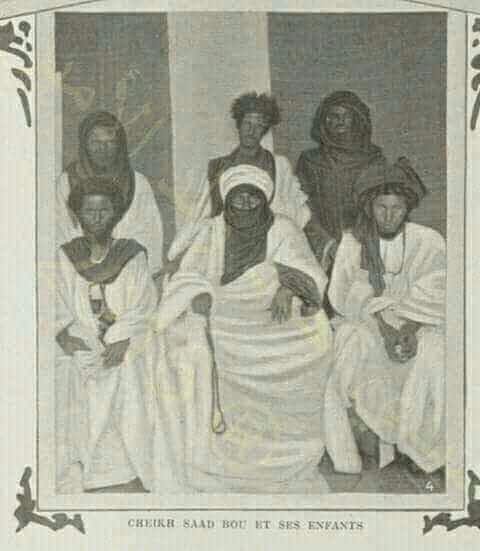
Sheikh Saad Buh pictured with his family.

Sheikh Saad Buh (Arabic: الشيخ سعد بوه) was a Moorish, Qadiriyyah, Fadiliyya Sufi from Mauritania. Buh, who settled in Trarza in the 1870s, developed a following in St. Louis, and began a pattern of visits to the peanut basin and river valley. In the late 1860s, before he was 20, Buh established ties with the French administration who were at the time trying to conquer the Senegalo-Mauritanian zone, and became involved in a network of teachers, schools and zawiyas (lodges) across the Sahel and Sahara.

Buh several times saved French explorers from local bands. He rescued Paul Soleillet, Blanchet and Fabert. Soleillet was rescued from a local band that pillaged his possessions.

Saad Buh had ties with the French for more than 50 years. He went on diplomatic missions for them- such as trying to convince Lat-Dior to let the French build their railway, or to dissuade Ma Ba from warring with the French.

In return for his aid to the French Buh sought free travel, gifts and aid for his camps in Mauritania. He gained permission from the French to tour Senegal (which was comparatively richer than Mauritania) in order to collect gifts, alms which he gave to his disciples in Mauritania.

In 1910, he wrote a letter of counsel, which became famous, to his brother Ma al-'Aynayn urging him not to wage war on the French, saying that French stability had allowed Islam to spread and acquire stability in the region. He used sources from the Quran to argue that Islam should be a pacifist religion.

== Sources ==
- Behrman, L. C., Muslim Brotherhoods and Politics in Senegal, Cambridge, 1970.
- Kingsbury, K. A., Doctoral Thesis on the Mourides of Senegal, to be published 2009. Oxford University.
- Marty, P. Études sur l'Islam au Sénégal. 2 vols. Paris: Ernest Leroux, 1917
- Robinson, D. Paths of Accommodation: Muslim societies and French colonial authorities in Senegal and Mauritania, 1880-1920. Athens, Ohio University Press (2000) ISBN 0-8214-1353-8.
