= Béma, Mali =

Béma
- Commune and town
- Location in Mali
- Coordinates: 15.044°N 9.354°W
- Country: Mali
- Region: Kayes Region
- Cercle: Diéma Cercle

Area
  - Total: 1,350 km^{2} (520 sq mi)

Population (2009 census)
  - Total: 25,749
  - Density: 19.1/km^{2} (49.4/sq mi)
- Time zone: UTC+0 (GMT)

Béma is a rural commune and small town in the Cercle of Diéma in the Kayes Region of western Mali. The commune contains 24 villages and hamlets. In the 2009 census, the commune had a population of 25,749 (12,326 men and 13,103 women). The capital city, Bamako, is 400 km to the south-east.
