= Khasso =

Former West African kingdom

Kingdom of Khasso
- 1681–1880
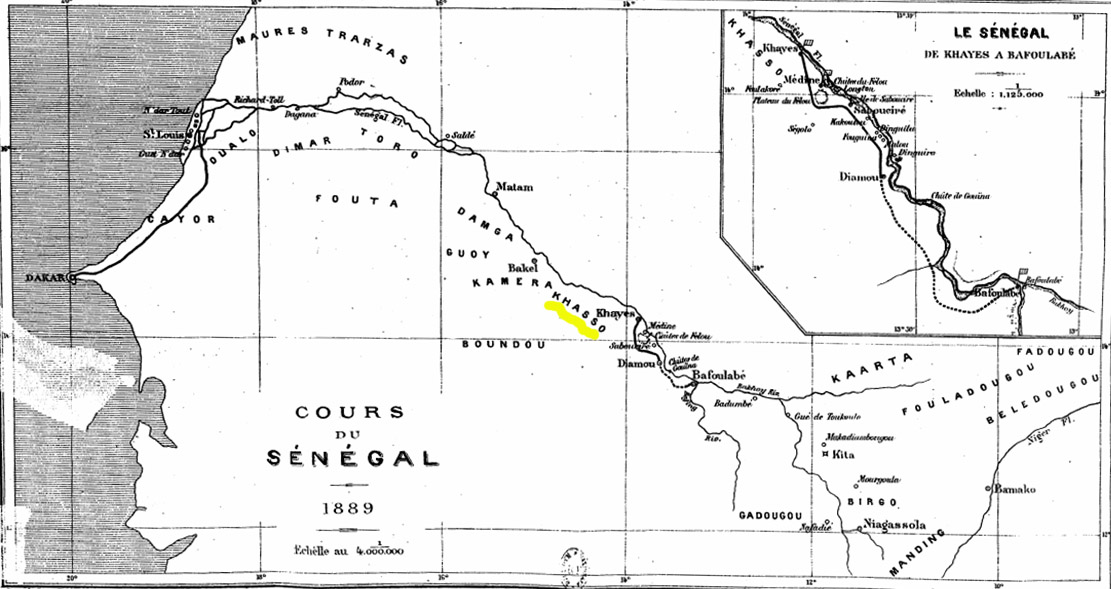
- 1889 map of the Senegal River, with Khasso highlighted.
- Capital: Kouniakary and then Médine
- Common languages: Mandinka language
- Religion: traditional African religion, Sunni Islam
- Government: Monarchy
- Historical era: Early modern period
  - Fula immigration to Khasso: before 1600
  - Battle of Toumbifara: 1681
  - Split into five smaller kingdoms: 1800
  - Incorporation into French Sudan: 1880
Succeeded by
French West Africa
- Today part of: Mali

Khasso or Xaaso is a region and former West African kingdom of the 17th to 19th centuries, occupying territory in what is today the Kayes Region of Mali. From the 17th to 19th centuries, its capital was at Medina until its fall.

Khasso straddles both banks of the upper Senegal River roughly from Kayes to Bafoulabe, in a strip at most 60 km wide. It is located at the transition point between the mountains to the south and the arid plans to the north, and between the Senegambia region and the Niger River valley.

== History ==
Over two thousand years ago, Khasso was populated by the Serer. The Khassonke people, however, were originally Fulas who immigrated to the area and integrated with the local Malinké and Soninké populations. Initially oppressed by their hosts, the Fula revolted and in 1681 under the leadership of Yamadou Hawa they won their independence in battle at Toumbifara, near Bafoulabe. They elected Séga Doua (r. 1681 - 1725), Yamadou's son, as the first fankamala, or king, of Khasso, and he quickly imposed his authority on the entire region as far as Gajaaga. Yamadou's sons Jajé Gansiri (1725-1737), Gimba Kinti (1737-1758) and Demba Séga (1758-1796) ruled over the most powerful state of the upper Senegal valley.

Upon Demba Séga's death, however, the kingdom fell into civil war and fragmented. The neighboring kingdom of Kaarta sacked the capital of Kouniakary, and Khasso fragmented into five smaller states: Dembaya (with the capital at Médine), Séro, Almamya (Silatiguiya), Diadiéya and Guimbaya. The most powerful of these was Dembaya under Hawa Demba Diallo (r. 1810–1833). These states were built by a warrior aristocracy as a means of securing slaves and plunder, with a strong army.

In November 1854 El Hajj Umar Tall completed a lightning conquest of Bambuk, and the petty kings of Khasso quickly and peacefully submitted as well. Tall built a tata in Kouniakary, whose commander functioned as regional governor. By the next year, however, the local kings were chafing under Toucouleur domination and rebelled, looking to the expanding French colonial presence for a powerful ally. In September 1855, Governor Louis Faidherbe built a fort at Medine, capital of Dembaya, and extended French protection over the so-called 'Khasso Confederation'. In reality, their control only extended to the left bank of the Senegal, and the right bank was summarily devastated by the Umarian commander, Thierno Jibi, with refugees flooding across the river.

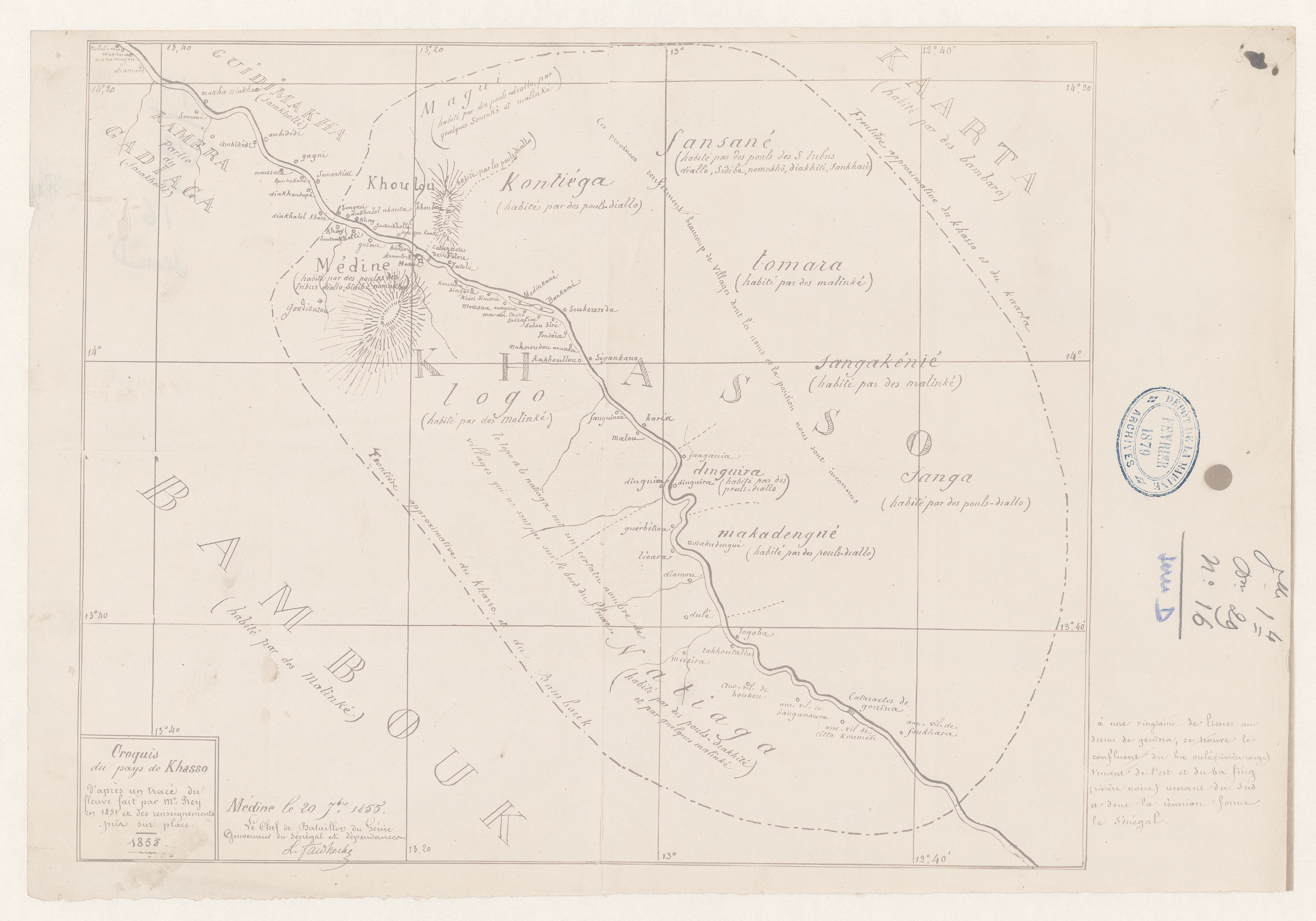
1855 map of Khasso

In 1857, Toucouleur conqueror El Hadj Umar Tall attacked Khasso as part of his jihad, but was repulsed at Medina Fort with the aid of the Khasso's French allies. This conflict and the associated refugee flows exacerbated a famine that began in 1856 and extended to 1861, emptying entire villages and driving much of the surviving population into temporary exile. However, the Khasso found themselves increasingly under French control until they were assimilated into French Sudan in 1880.

== Society and Economy ==
Like the Bambara Empire to the east, the Khasso kingdoms depended heavily on the slave trade for their economy. A family's status was indicated by the number of slaves it owned, leading to wars for the sole purpose of taking more captives. This trade led the Khasso into increasing contact with the European settlements of Africa's west coast, particularly the French. About 50% of the Khassonke population were slaves.

Prior to the Umarian jihad, Khasso was only superficially Islamic, with most of the population still practicing some degree of traditional religious beliefs. After many leaders joined the Toucouleur in the 1850s, Islam began to make inroads among the population and gradually came to dominate.

Present-day inhabitants of this region often identify themselves as Khassonké.
