= Muntaga Tall (faama) =

- Died: 1885; Nioro du Sahel
- Father: El Hajj Oumar Tall
- Religion: Islam

Muntaga or Mountaga Tall was a son of El Hajj Umar Tall, founder of the Toucouleur Empire. In 1874 he was given command of Nioro du Sahel by his brother Ahmadu Tall, and quickly had to suppress a rebellion led by the towns of Tambacara in Diafunu and Sero in Jambukhu.

In 1885 Muntaga, encouraged by overtures from the French, rebelled. Ahmadu laid a long and grueling siege of Nioro, but rather than surrender Muntaga committed suicide by blowing up his powder magazine. This internal strife played a key role in weakening the Toucouleur Empire and facilitating its conquest by the French.
