= Khassonké people =

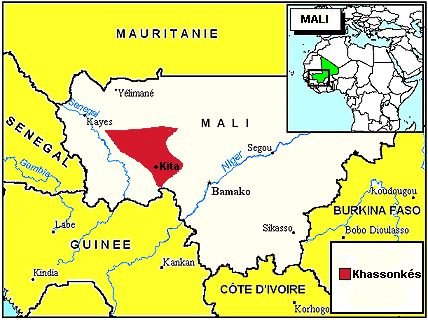
The Khassonké heartland in Mali.

The Khassonké (pronounced "kassonkay") are an ethnic group of Mali's Kayes Region. Descendants of the Fula and Malinké Khasso kingdoms, they speak the Khassonke/Xaasongaxango language, a Manding language similar to Bambara.

Their traditional musical instruments are the dundunba (a big cylindrical drum with two skins), the jingò (a small cylindrical drum with two skins), the tantanwò (a small drum), the tamandinwo (an aisselle drum), as well as lutes and harps and hunters' whistles.
