= Kouniakary =

- Urban commune and town
- Location in Mali
- Coordinates: 14°34′35″N 10°54′0″W
- Country: Mali
- Region: Kayes Region
- Cercle: Kayes Cercle

Population (2009 census)
  - Total: 8,135
- Time zone: UTC+0 (GMT)

Kouniakary or Koniakari is a town and urban commune in the Cercle of Kayes in the Kayes Region of south-western Mali. The town is located approximately 65 kilometres from Kayes city. In 2009 the commune had a population of 8135.

Koniakary was the capital of the kingdom of Khasso, and was sacked by Kaarta in 1800. In 1855, El Hadj Umar Tall constructed a tata at Koniakari to protect against the soldiers of French Colonel Louis Archinard; the tata still stands today, and has become a tourist attraction.
