= Tata (fortification) =

Fortified settlement in West Africa

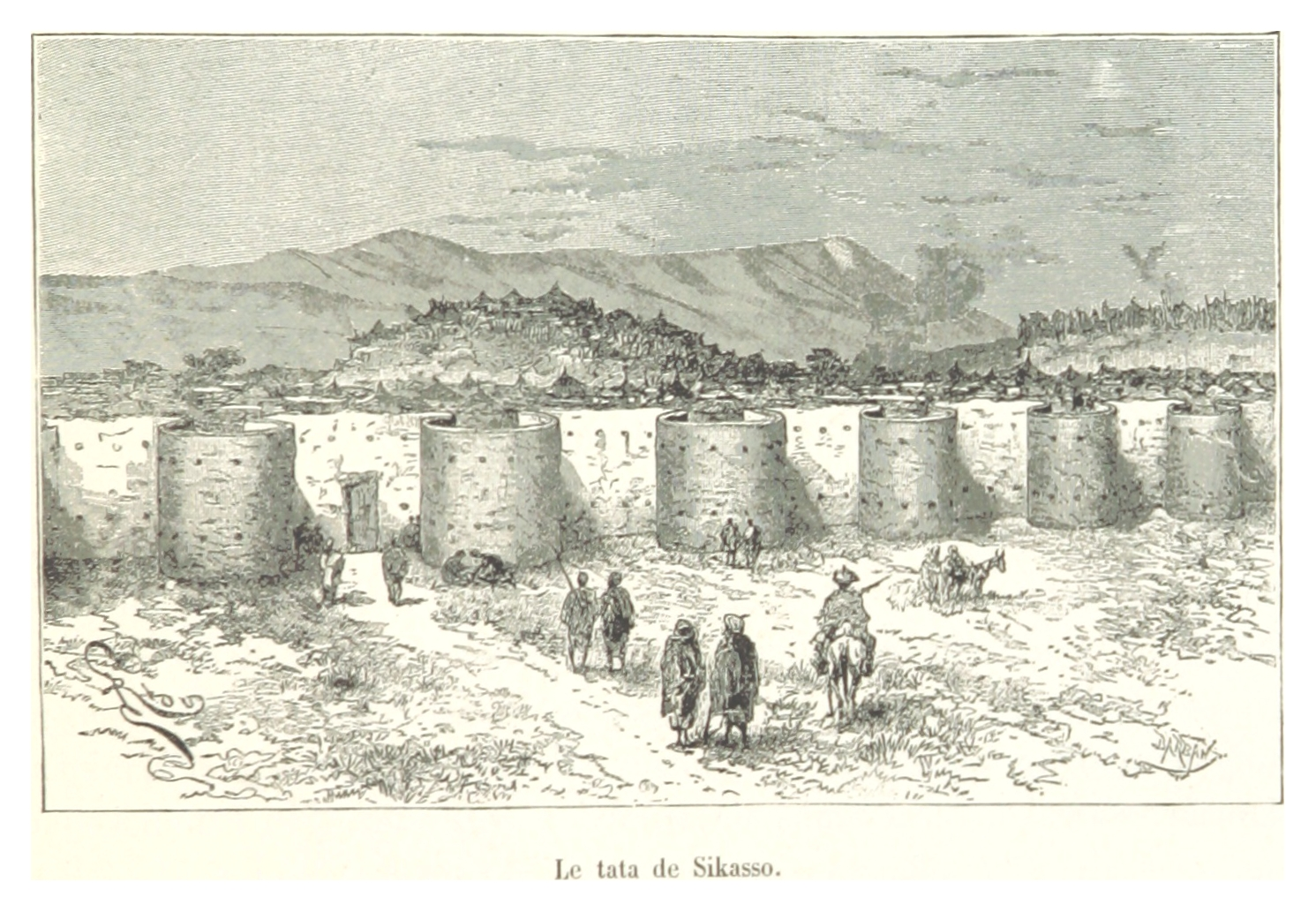
The Tata of Sikasso

A tata or tata somba is a historic type of fortification used throughout West Africa. The word is applied to the wall itself as well as the elite living spaces within it for the ruler of the tata and his court. It can also designate the defenses around a major city or other military center. The term 'tata' derives from the Mandinka language but has been used across a wide area, roughly corresponding to the former Mali Empire, since at least the 16th century.

Tata are often made of wood and rammed earth or mudbrick, but sometimes of stone as well. They usually have round or square towers, sometimes thatched, with arrow or gun slits.

Tata ruins, such as that of Maba Diakhou Bâ near Nioro du Rip in Senegal, generally date from the 19th century, though some are older. The construction materials used make them vulnerable to erosion and degradation if not maintained regularly. The tata of northern Togo and Benin are a UNESCO World Heritage Site.

== List of tatas ==
- Tata of Sikasso
- Tata of Chasselay
- Koniakary Tata
- Tata of Kansala
- Tata of Yang-Yang

== Images ==
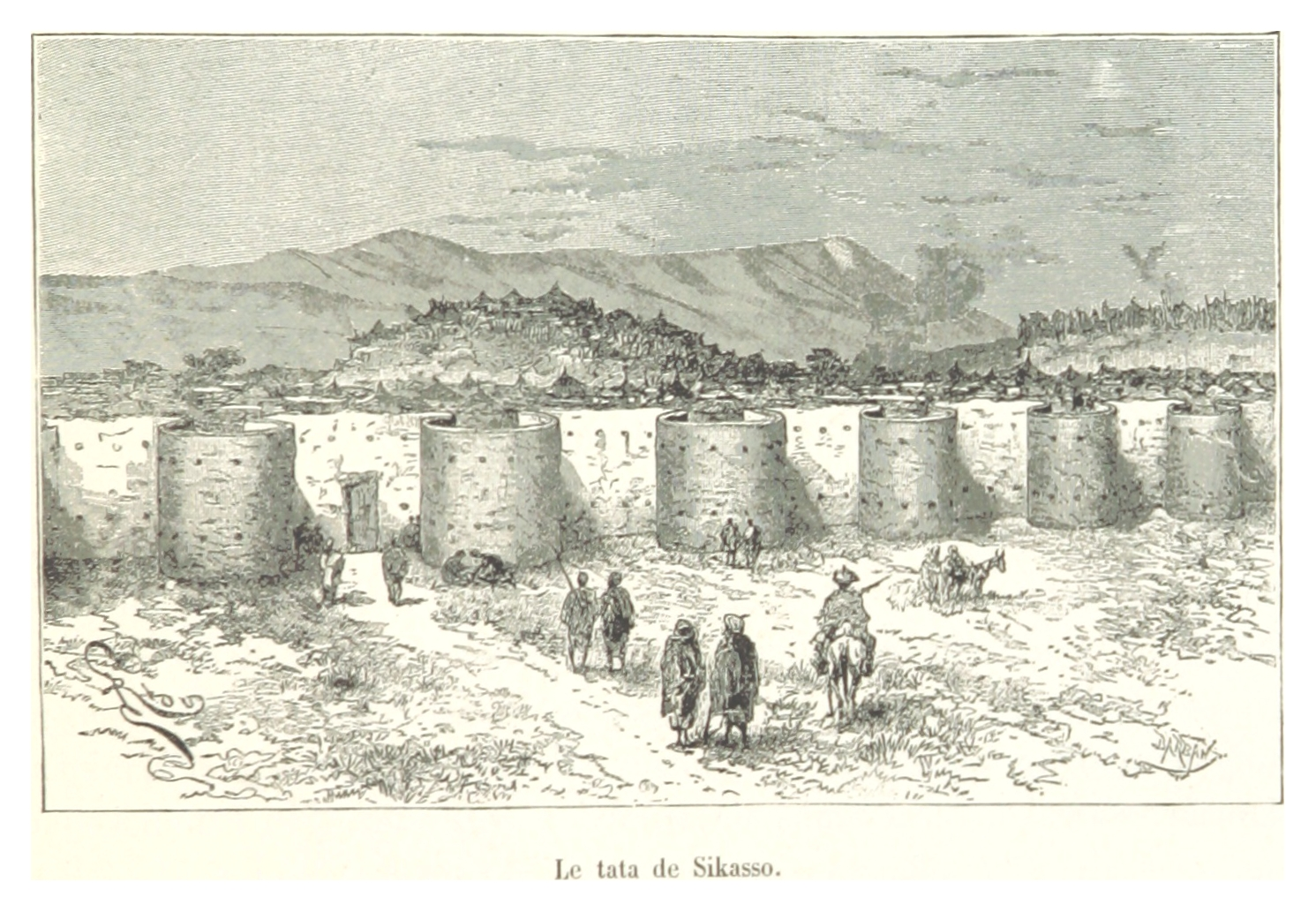
The Tata of Sikasso, illustration by Édouard Riou

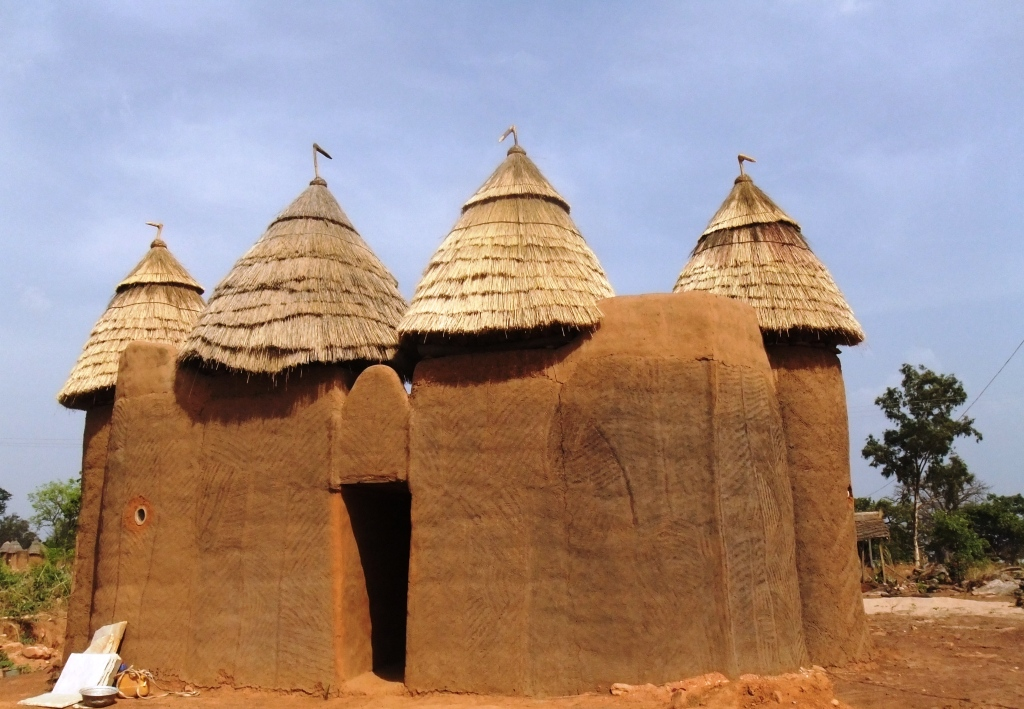
A tata in Kouaba in Bénin

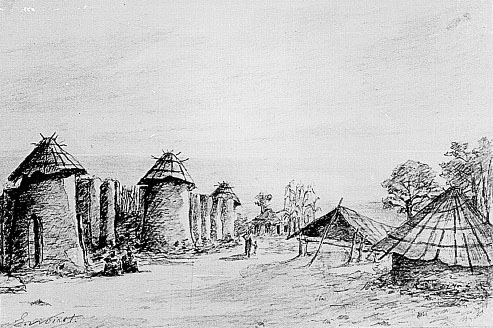
The tata of Kédougou in Sénégal (1881)

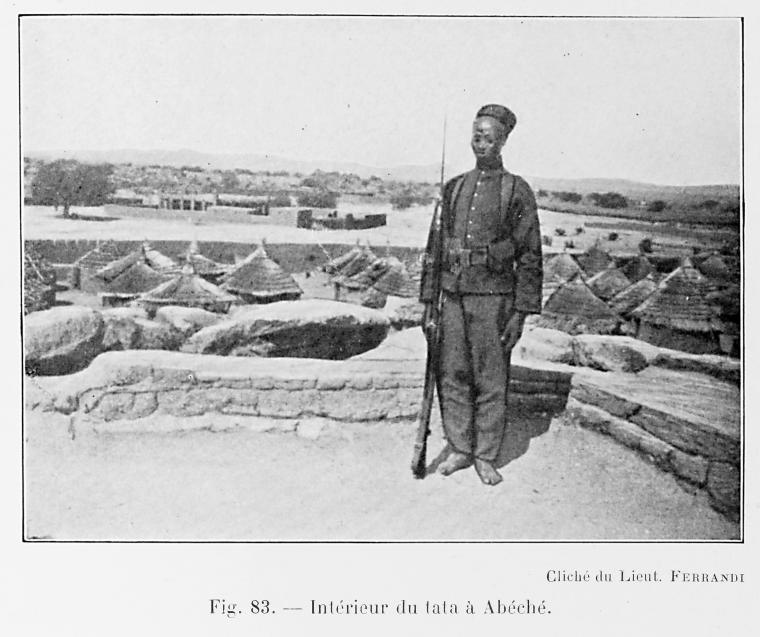
Interior of the tata of Abeche in Chad (1918)

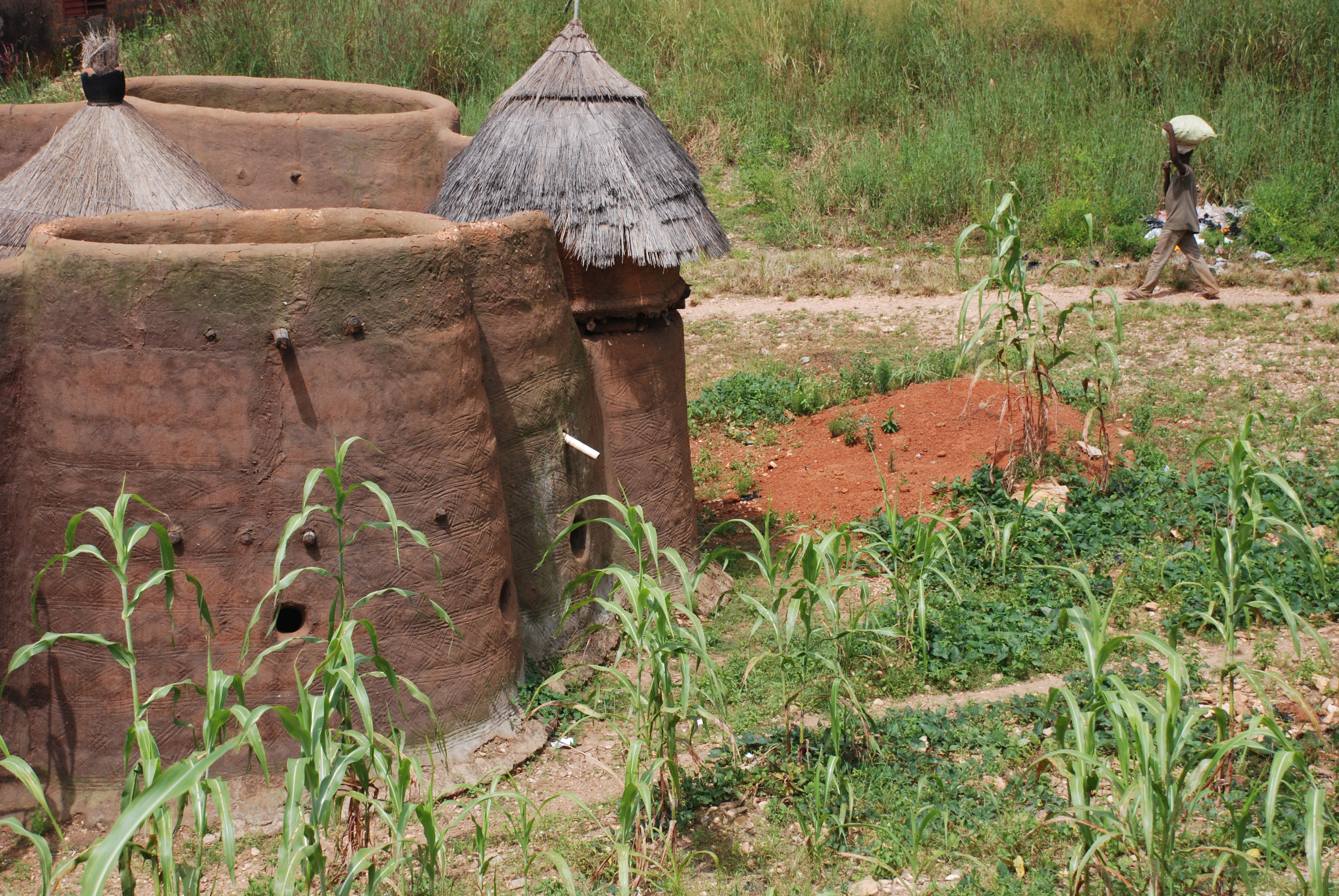
A reconstructed tata somba in Benin

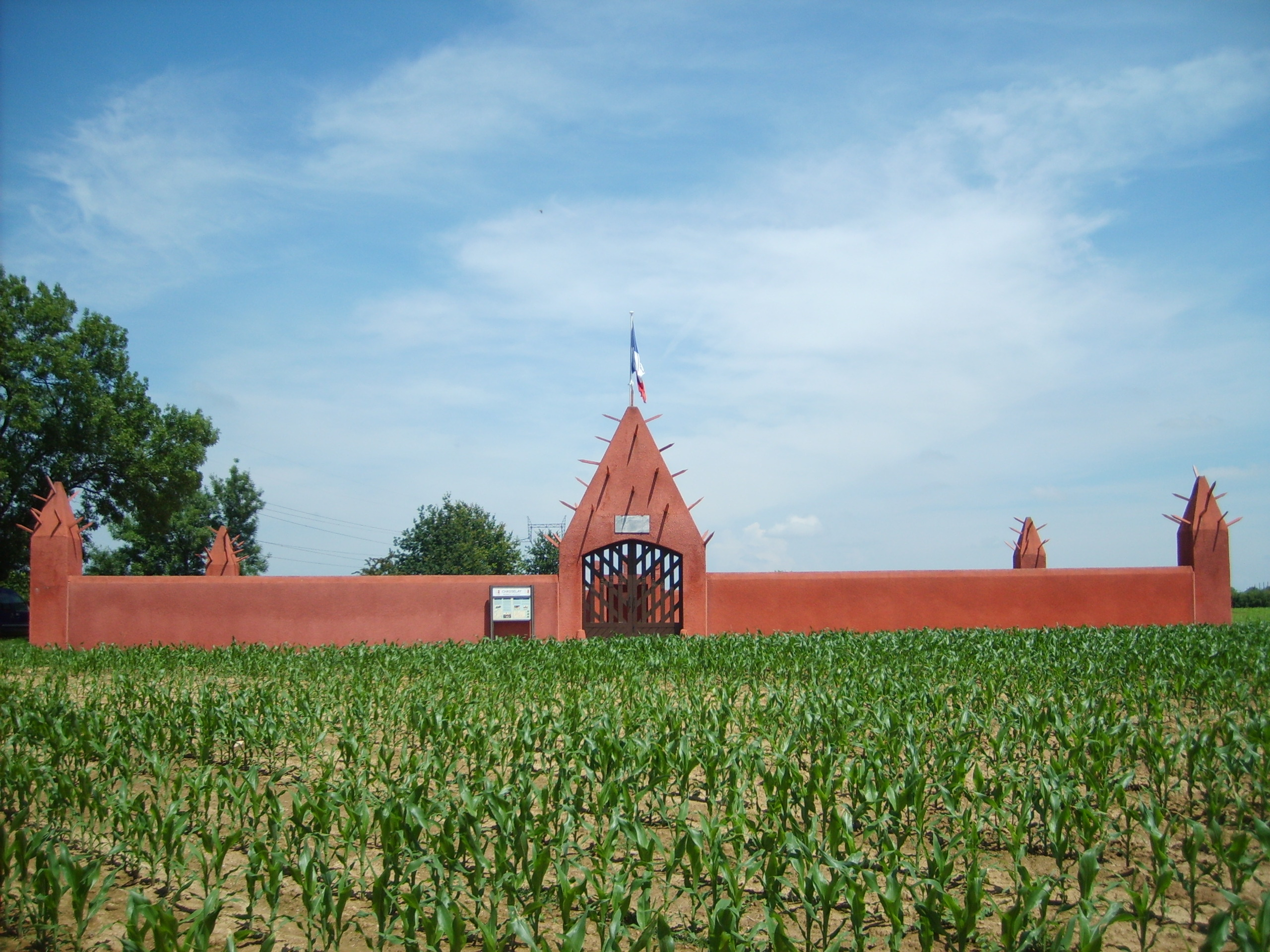
The Tata of Chasselay

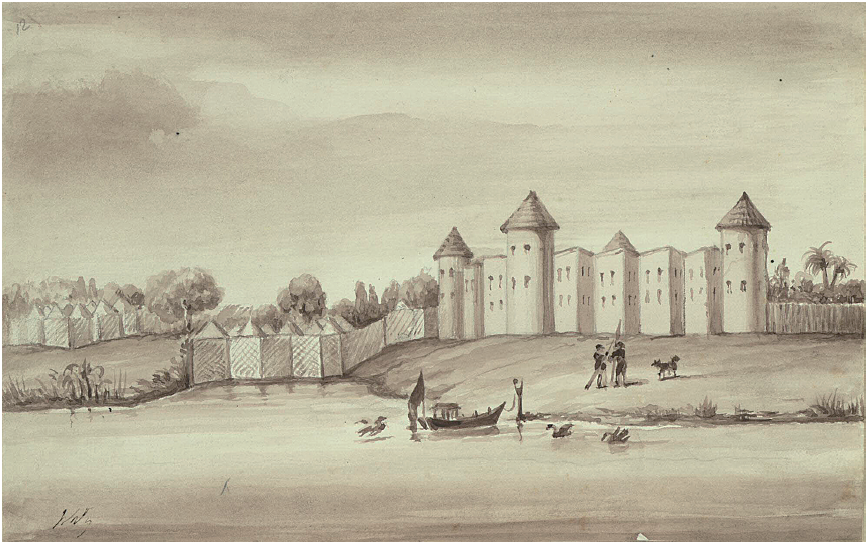
The tata of Kankelefa (1849)

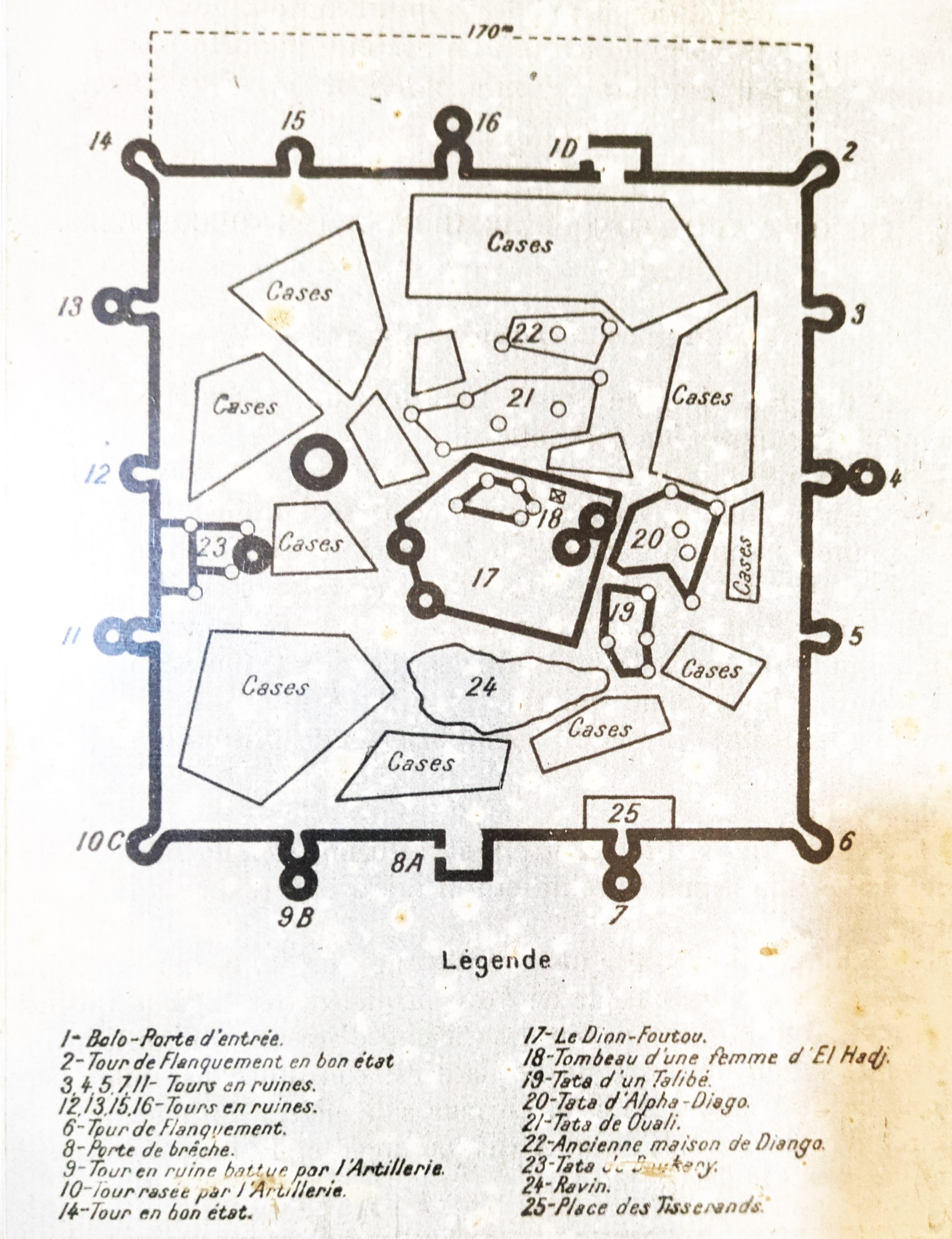
The tata of Yang-Yang, Senegal

== Bibliography ==
- Canós-Donnay, Sirio (2022). "Fluid fortresses in changing states: Tàta in southern Senegal (13th–19th centuries AD)". In Ibsen, Timo; Ilves, Kristin; Maixner, Birgit; Messal, Sebastian; Schneeweiß, Jens (eds.). Fortifications in their Natural and Cultural Landscape: From Organising Space to the Creation of Power. Bonn: Habelt-Verlag. pp. 69–82.
- "Tata", in Bernard Nantet, Dictionnaire de l'Afrique. Histoire, civilisation, actualité, Larousse, Paris, 2006 (nouvelle édition), p. 280 ISBN 2-03-582658-6
- Raymond Mauny, "Du nouveau sur les murs Tata de Dakar", Notes africaines, No. 17, Dakar, 1943, p. 14-15
- C. Meillassoux, "Plans d'anciennes fortifications (Tata) en pays Malinké", Journal des Africanistes, 1966, tome 36, 1, p. 29-44
