= Kaarta =

West African state 1650 to 1890

Kingdom of Kaarta Kaarta
- c.1650–1890
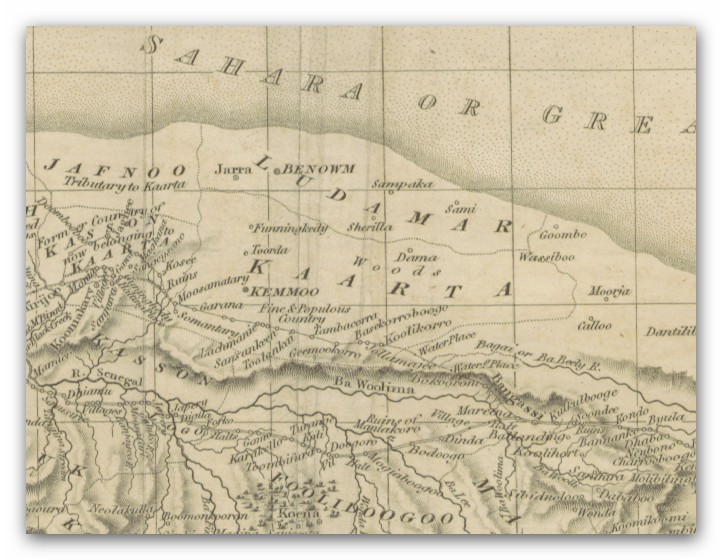
- The Kingdom of Kaarta on a map, published 1825
- Capital: Diangounté, Nioro du Sahel.
- Common languages: Bambara
- Religion: traditional African religion
- Government: Monarchy
- Faama
  - 1650-1710: Massa
  - 1754-58: Sey Bamana Coulibaly
- History
  - Massa founds the kingdom: c.1650
  - Re-established: 1754
  - Conquest by the Toucouleur Empire: 1854
  - Conquered by France: 1890
  - Annexed by France: 1904
- Currency: cowries, mithqal
Preceded by	Succeeded by
Songhai Empire	Toucouleur Empire
- Today part of: Mali

Kaarta, (Also known as Ka'arta or the Massassi State) was a Bambara kingdom that arose after the fall of the Songhai Empire in what is today the western half of Mali and lasted until its destruction by Umar Tall in the 1850s.

== History ==
=== Early history ===
According to legend, Sounsan, the first capital of Kaarta was founded near Mourdiah around 1635 by Sunsana, son of Niangolo. His son Massa (r. 1650-1710) was famously productive both on the farm and in the bedroom, expanding his power and holdings by marrying his many daughters to men who would come fight for him by raiding his neighbors. In 1710 rule passed to his son Benefali (r. 1710-1745), who fought a long war against the rising power of Bitòn Coulibaly and the Segou Empire. Benefali's son Foulakoro (r. 1745-1754) besieged Mourdiah, whose inhabitants begged for aid from Coulibaly. He came to Kaarta with an army, defeated Foulakoro, and captured him. The faama of Kaarta soon died in captivity.

=== Re-Founding ===
Kaarta was re-established by Sey Bamana Coulibaly, who had fled Segou in 1754. He was succeeded by his brother Deniba Bo, who ruled from 1758-1761. In these early years, the rulers raided continuously to overrun weaker neighbors and acquire captives.

Faama Sira Bo (r. 1761-1781) led a re-emergence of Kaarta as a regional power, establishing a permanent capital at Diangounté or Guemou and vassalizing Diarra and Khasso in 1777, as well as raiding Beledougou and Bambuk. Sira Bo was succeeded by Desse Koro, who was defeated in battle by Mansong Diarra in 1794. Bodian Moriba (r.1818-1832) re-asserted the kingdom's power, made an alliance with Segou, ending 30 years of war, and moved the capital from Yélimané to Nioro du Sahel.

=== Fall to the Toucouleur ===
The kingdom was destroyed as an independent force in 1854 by El Hadj Umar Tall's jihad. He seized Nioro, and put the Faama Mamady Kandian and his entire family to death, ending the Massassi dynasty. After his death, his son Mokhtar Tall was made governor of the region. He rebelled against his older brother Ahmadu Tall in 1869, but was ultimately defeated and imprisoned in 1873. He was replaced by Muntaga Tall. In 1885, encouraged by overtures from the French, Muntaga rebelled in turn, but was forced to commit suicide when Ahmadu besieged Nioro.

=== French Conquest ===
In 1878 the French governor of Senegal Briere de l'Isle sent a French force against the Kaarta Toucouleur vassal state along the north bank of the Senegal River. Blocked by the colonial minister in Paris, he argued that they were a threat to the Senegalese Imamate of Futa Toro (then a French client state) with which the British were poised to interfere. The Ministry gave in and on 7 July 1878, a French force destroyed the Kaarta Toucouleur fort at Sabouciré, killing their leader, Almany Niamody. This portion of the Kaarta vassals was then incorporated into the Khasso protectorate kingdom.

French Colonel Louis Archinard later conquered the entire territory of the former Kaarta kingdom in 1890, which was formally annexed into French West Africa in 1904.

== Government ==
Political power was tightly controlled by the Massasi clan, and succession rarely caused conflict like it did in the Segou Empire. They ensured that the military leadership, the tondjon, was loyal, and the core of the army answered directly to the king. Positions of power went to members of the clan who traditionally tended to the royal family's guardian spirit.

== Economy ==
Kaarta was an important destination and transshipment point for salt from the Saharan regions of Tagant and Hodh.

== Sources ==
- Gomez, Michael (2002). Pragmatism in the Age of Jihad: The Precolonial State of Bundu (2nd ed.). UK: Cambridge University Press. ISBN 9780521528474.
- Izard, M.; Ki-Zerbo, Joseph (1992). "From the Niger to the Volta". In Ogot, B. A. (ed.). General History of Africa vol. V: Africa from the Sixteenth to the Eighteenth Century. UNESCO.
- Page, Willie F.; Davis, R. Hunt, eds. (2005). Encyclopedia of African History and Culture. Vol. III: From Conquest to Colonization (1500–1850). Facts on File. ISBN 0-8160-5271-9.
- Robinson, David (1985). The Holy War of Umar Tal The Western Sudan in the mid-Nineteenth Century. Oxford: Clarendon Press.
