= Nioro du Sahel =

- Commune and town
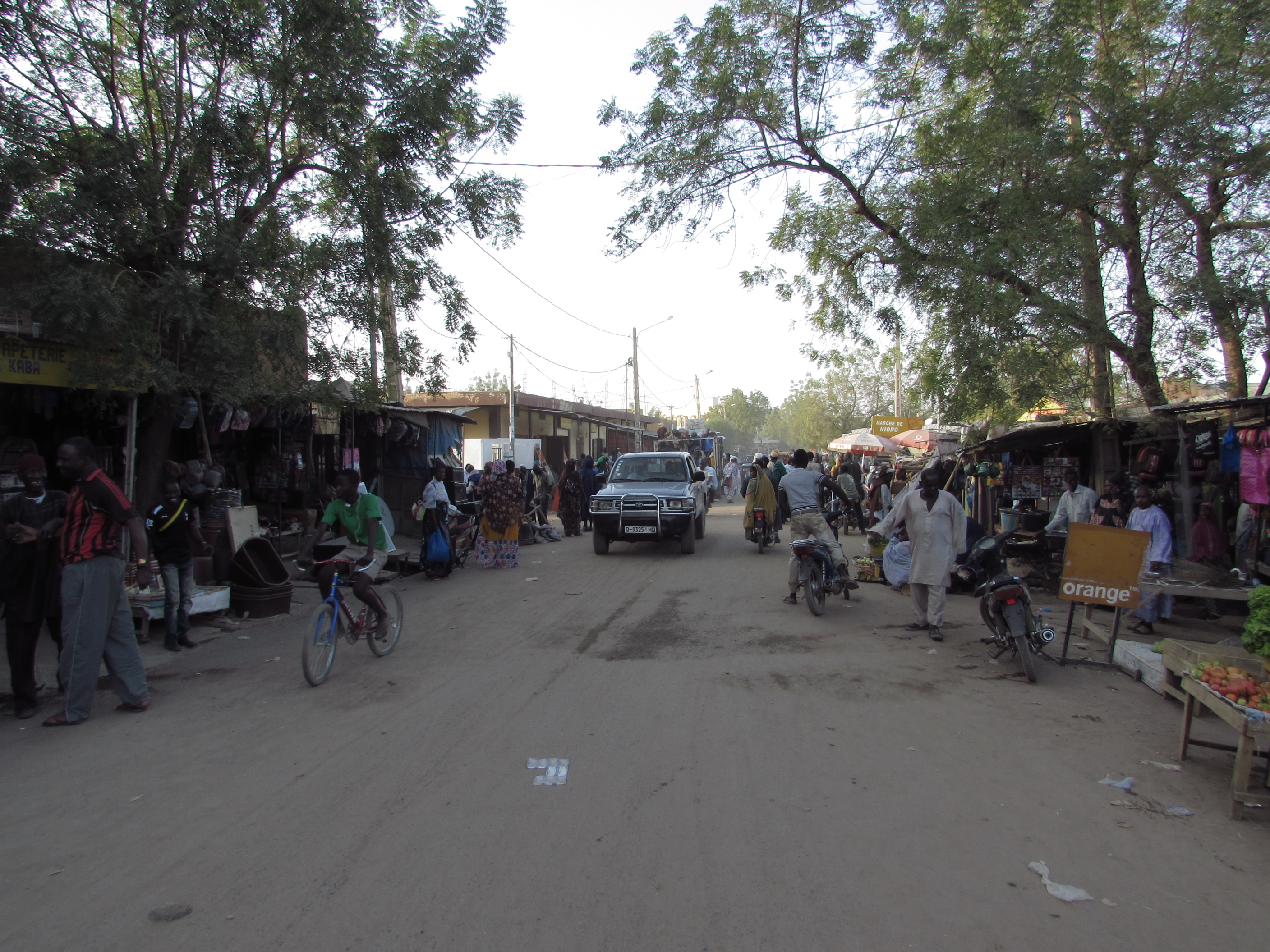

- Location in Mali
- Coordinates: 15°11′N 9°33′W
- Country: Mali
- Region: Nioro Region
- Cercle: Nioro du Sahel Cercle

Government
  - Mayor: Abbas Sylla

Population (2023)
  - Total: 109,565
- Time zone: UTC+0 (GMT)

Nioro du Sahel (often referred to as simply Nioro) is a town and urban commune in the Nioro Region of western Mali, 241 km from the city of Kayes. It is located 443 kilometres or 275 miles (by road) north-west of the Malian capital Bamako. As of 2023, the commune had a population of 109,565. The town has an airstrip at Nioro Airport.

== History ==
Founded in circa 1240 by a Diawambé slave named Beydari Tamboura, Nioro was made the capital of the Bambara kingdom of Kaarta by king Bodian Moriba (r. 1818-1832), replacing Yélimané. The town became an important trading center between Upper Senegal and the Sudan.

On April 11th 1855 the Toucouleur conqueror El Hadj Umar Tall invaded Kaarta and seized Nioro, which became his capital. He had a great mosque built in Nioro in 1856, and a large Muslim community subsequently settled in the town.

After Umar Tall's death, his son Ahmadu succeeded him as head of the Toucouleur Empire. Ahmadu made his brother Muntaga Tall the Faama of Nioro in 1874. In 1885 Muntaga, encouraged by overtures from the French, rebelled. Ahmadu laid a long and grueling siege of Nioro, but rather than surrender Muntaga committed suicide by blowing up his powder magazine. After this, Ahmadu based himself in Nioro, attempting to build a fully Islamic society.

A long series of conflicts and negotiations between the Toucouleur and the French culminated in a campaign against Nioro in late 1890. Ahmadu's army, led by the Wolof king-in-exile Alboury Ndiaye, failed to defend the city against the advancing colonial army under Lieutenant Colonel Louis Archinard in January 1891. The town became one of the first cercle seats in French Sudan. Ahmadu fled eastwards to Bandiagara.

From 1910, Nioro became the centre of Hamallism, a Sufi movement that emerged from the Tijaniyyah and was founded by Sheikh Hamallah. Followers of Hamallism were actively hostile to the colonial presence and were violently repressed by the authorities, with the repression peaking in 1940–1941.

During the independence struggle that led to the creation of the Sudanese Republic in 1960, Nioro was a political stronghold of the Sudanese Union – African Democratic Rally.

== Climate ==
Climate data for Nioro (1961–1990)
Month	Jan	Feb	Mar	Apr	May	Jun	Jul	Aug	Sep	Oct	Nov	Dec	Year
Mean daily maximum °C (°F)	31.4 (88.5)	34.7 (94.5)	37.5 (99.5)	40.0 (104.0)	41.3 (106.3)	39.4 (102.9)	34.8 (94.6)	32.9 (91.2)	34.5 (94.1)	37.3 (99.1)	35.7 (96.3)	31.6 (88.9)	35.9 (96.6)
Daily mean °C (°F)	22.7 (72.9)	25.2 (77.4)	28.2 (82.8)	31.4 (88.5)	34.0 (93.2)	33.1 (91.6)	29.5 (85.1)	27.9 (82.2)	28.8 (83.8)	29.7 (85.5)	26.7 (80.1)	22.9 (73.2)	28.3 (82.9)
Mean daily minimum °C (°F)	13.5 (56.3)	16.1 (61.0)	19.1 (66.4)	23.6 (74.5)	27.2 (81.0)	27.0 (80.6)	24.6 (76.3)	23.6 (74.5)	23.6 (74.5)	22.6 (72.7)	18.2 (64.8)	14.2 (57.6)	21.2 (70.2)
Average precipitation mm (inches)	0.5 (0.02)	0.0 (0.0)	0.0 (0.0)	2.5 (0.10)	7.1 (0.28)	46.4 (1.83)	132.8 (5.23)	148.9 (5.86)	92.0 (3.62)	26.0 (1.02)	1.0 (0.04)	0.8 (0.03)	458 (18.03)
Average rainy days	0.1	0.0	0.0	0.7	2.0	5.1	11.4	10.2	9.1	3.1	0.3	0.1	42.1
Mean monthly sunshine hours	259.4	246.0	275.3	267.5	263.7	251.4	247.8	245.1	247.8	260.4	255.0	244.6	3,064
Source: NOAA
