= Amadu III =

Ruler of Hamdullahi in Mali (1830–1862)

Amadu III of Masina
- أحمد بن أحمد بن أحمد لبّو

Alamami of the Caliphate of Hamdullahi
- In office 1852 – 16 May 1862
- Preceded by: Amadu II of Masina

Personal details
- Born: 1830
- Died: 16 May 1862 (aged 31–32)

Amadu III of Masina (Arabic: أحمد بن أحمد بن أحمد لبّو, Fula: Āmadu mo Āmadu mo Āmadu Lobbo), also known as Amadu Amadu (Note: Seku Amadu III: "Seku" is the Fulani equivalent of the Arabic title "Shaykh", a religious leader. The full name of Amadu III in Arabic, the main written language of the region during his lifetime, was Aḥmad bin Aḥmad bin Aḥmad bin Muḥammad Lobbo. "bin" means "son of" and "Lobbo" was his family name. He was known as Āmadu Āmadu. European spelling and titles vary. Heinrich Barth, who visited the region in 1853-1854, calls him the Emir Hámedu of Hamd-Alláhi. Another source calls him Shekko A'hmedu ben A'hmedu, Sultan of Masina.) (1830 - 16 May 1862) was the third and last ruler of the theocratic Caliphate of Hamdullahi (Diina of Hamdullahi) in the Inner Niger Delta, now the Mopti Region of Mali. He was elected as successor to his father, Amadu II of Masina, in 1853. Throughout most of his rule he was involved in conflict with the jihadist al-Hajj 'Umar Tall, who defeated and executed him on 16 May 1862.

== Background ==
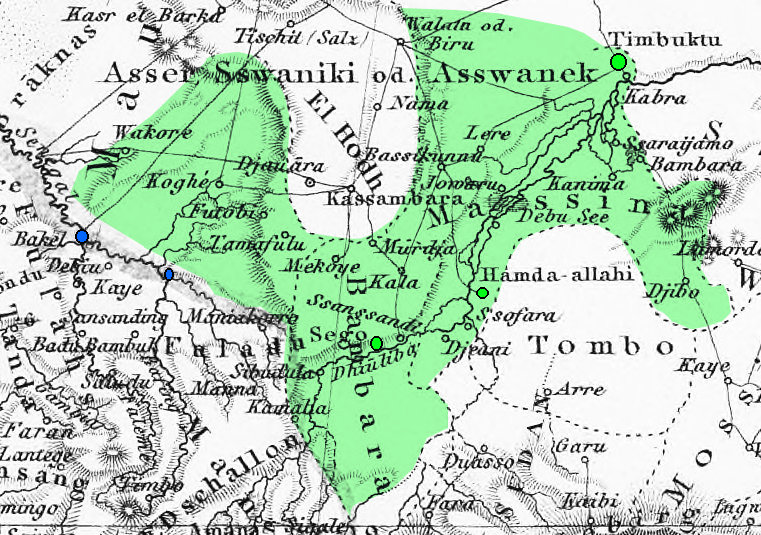
German map of the region c.1861 - Massina to the east.

Amadu III was the grandson of the founder of the Diina of Hamdullahi, Seku Amadu. Some time between 1810 and 1818 Seku Amadu (Aḥmad bin Muḥammad bin Abi Bakr Lobbo) launched a jihad against the Fulbe chiefs in Masina, tributaries of the pagan Bambara of Segu, whom he accused of idolatry. The goals of the jihad soon expanded to that of conquest of the Bambara and others in the region. Aḥmad bin Muḥammad established a large empire based on Hamdallahi, which he had founded as the capital. He received support from Tukolor and Fulbe people who were seeking independence from the Bamabara, although later he met resistance from these people when he imposed a rigorous Islamic theocracy based on the Maliki interpretation of Sharia law. The state was ruled by a council of forty elders, who gave directions to provincial governors. Most of the governors were related to Aḥmad bin Muḥammad. When Aḥmad bin Muḥammad died in 1844, he was succeeded by his son Aḥmad bin Aḥmad (Amadu II), father of Amadu III.

== Ruler ==
Ahmadu II was killed in 1852 during a raid on the Bambara. He had nominated his son as his successor. In 1853 Amadu III was elected to the position of Almami of the Diina in accordance with his father's wishes. Another candidate for election, Ba Lobbo, was passed over but remained influential as a member of the Tijani faction at court. Ba Lobbo was Amadu's uncle, and a leader in the army.

Although less learned than his grandfather and father, Aḥmad III continued their highly puritanical Islamic practices such as banning the use of tobacco and requiring full segregation of men and women. However, he was less rigid in matters of Islamic education and control, more willing to follow traditions of Fulbe social structure. During his rule tensions mounted between the more puritanical Tijaniyyah minority and the more relaxed Qadiriyya community. When the German traveler Heinrich Barth reached Timbuktu in September 1853, he was given the protection of Aḥmad al-Bakkāy, the political and religious leader of the Kunta, who refused Aḥmad III's demands to hand him over. Amadu ordered Barth's death as an infidel. The Hamdullahi forces threatened him several times during his travels in the Middle Niger.

The struggle with Segu continued in the early part of his rule, and Amadu III continued to dispatch raids deep into Segu territory until 1855. He tried to gain control of Sinsani so he could use its forces in his conflict with Segu.

== Conflict with Tukolor al-Hajj Umar Tall ==
The Tukolor religious and military leader al-Hajj 'Umar Tall, originally from Futa Toro, launched a jihad against unbelievers in 1853. He quickly overran many of the Bambara and Malinke states in the upper parts of the Senegal and Niger basins. After defeating the Bambara state of Kaarta in 1855, 'Umar proposed an alliance with Aḥmadu III to conquer the Bambara state of Segu. Aḥmadu may have suspected 'Umar's motives, and instead sent an army to attack 'Umar, which was defeated at Kassakeri in Kaarta by 'Umar's forces in 1856. Recognizing that the Masina troops were Muslim, 'Umar had their wounded treated and returned. This contrasted with his treatment of pagan prisoners.

After the defeat, one of Amadu's main advisors, al Hajj Seidou, urged him to make common cause with Bina 'Alī, the Fama (king) of Segu against 'Umar. When al-Hajj 'Umar attacked Segu in 1861, Aḥmadu III lent aid to Bina 'Alī on condition that he accept Islam. In January 1861 the Hamdullahi army was mobilized under the leadership of Ba Lobbo with 8,000 cavalry, 5,000 infantry and 1,000 musketeers and was joined at Tio, opposite Sinsani on the right bank of the Niger, by what was left of the Segu forces. In mid-February two fleets of canoes clashed in mid-stream. About 500 of Umar's troops attacked a village near Tio on their own initiative, were caught and destroyed. The next day Umar split his army into two wings, which crossed the river at night, crushed the forces of Masina and Segu at Tio and marched on to the capital of Segu. There they looted the treasures held in the Jara storehouses. In March 1861, Ba Lobbo regrouped his army and advanced towards Segu, but was defeated once more by 'Umar's forces.

'Umar faced criticism in his war against Masina, since its people were Muslims. As proof that 'Alī's conversion was a sham, 'Umar collected idols in Segu that had not been destroyed. 'Umar issued a Bayan in which he said that Ahmadu had accepted "a thousand mithqals of gold" in return for supporting 'Ali. In a public exchange of letters, 'Umar clearly demonstrated his superior Islamic learning. 'Umar may have been trying to win over the Tijanis under Ba Lobbo. An attempt to arrange peace between Aḥmadu III and 'Umar was not successful, and 'Umar invaded Masina.

== Defeat and death ==
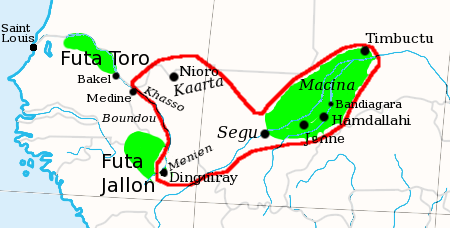
Territory controlled by al-Hajj 'Umar at the time of his death.

In 1862 'Umar advanced into Masina, receiving deserters and meeting little resistance. Amadu III was joined by the Kunta under Ahmad al-Bekkay, who had until then been his enemies but supported him in the face of aggression by a Muslim, which was contrary to the law. Before the decisive battle 'Umar proposed to fight a duel with Aḥmadu III, but the latter refused. Aḥmadu was defeated in battle on 15 May 1862 at Cayawal, and 'Umar occupied Hamdallahi. Aḥmadu was captured and decapitated. Ba Lobbo briefly continued resistance against the Tokolor, but the death of Amadu III and the loss of Hamdullahi marked the end of the Massina Empire as an effective force in the region.

Despite al-Hajj 'Umar's eloquent justifications, the controversy over the war against the Muslim state of Masina continued after the death of Amadu III. A revolt broke out against 'Umar in 1863, and he was killed in 1864. Although 'Umar did not have time to establish control of Masina, his nephew al-Tijānī (Tidiani Tall) succeeded. It was not until 1897 that the French took control of the region.

== Notes and references ==
Notes

Citations

Sources

- Anene, Joseph C.; Brown, Godfrey Norman (1968). Africa in the Nineteenth and Twentieth Centuries: A Handbook for Teachers and Students. Ibadan University Press. ISBN 9780175112593.
- Ayandele, E. A. (1979-04-19). African Historical Studies. Routledge. ISBN 978-0-203-98808-4.
- Barth, Heinrich (1857). Travels and discoveries in North and Central Africa: Being a journal of an expedition undertaken under the auspices of H. B. M.'s government, in the years 1849-1855. Harper & Brothers. p. 287.
- Flint, John E. (1977-01-20). The Cambridge History of Africa. Cambridge University Press. ISBN 978-0-521-20701-0.
- Holt, P. M.; Lambton, Ann K. S.; Lewis, Bernard (1977-04-21). The Cambridge History of Islam. Cambridge University Press. ISBN 978-0-521-29137-8.
- Hunwick, John O. (2003-06-01). Arabic Literature of Africa. BRILL. p. 212. ISBN 978-90-04-12444-8.
- Klein, Martin A. (1998-07-28). Slavery and Colonial Rule in French West Africa. Cambridge University Press. ISBN 978-0-521-59678-7.
- Levtzion, Nehemia (2012-09-21). History Of Islam In Africa. Ohio University Press. p. 140. ISBN 978-0-8214-4461-0.
- Martin, B. G. (2003-02-13). Muslim Brotherhoods in Nineteenth-Century Africa. Cambridge University Press. p. 92. ISBN 978-0-521-53451-2.
- Merriam-Webster (1999-09-01). Merriam-Webster's Encyclopedia of World Religions. Merriam-Webster. p. 1116. ISBN 978-0-87779-044-0.
- Roberts, Richard L. (1987). Warriors, Merchants, and Slaves: The State and the Economy in the Middle Niger Valley, 1700-1914. Stanford University Press. p. 82. ISBN 978-0-8047-6613-5.
- Robinson, David (1988). La Guerre sainte d'Al-Hajj Umar: le Soudan occidental au milieu du XIXe siècle. KARTHALA Editions. ISBN 978-2-86537-211-9.
- Saad, Elias N. (1983). Social History of Timbuktu: The Role of Muslim Scholars and Notables, 1400-1900. Cambridge University Press. ISBN 978-0-521-24603-3.
