= Battle of Segou =

Battle of Ségou
Date	March 10, 1861
Location	Segou, in Mali, West Africa
Result	Toucouleur victory

Belligerents
Toucouleur Empire	Bambara Empire

Commanders and leaders
El Hajj Umar Tall; Ahmadu Tall; Alfa Umar Baila Wane	Ali Diarra; Kégué Mari Diarra

The Battle of Ségou was a decisive point in the growth of the Toucouleur Empire (1850-1890), which spread throughout the upper Niger River and Senegal River bassins in the late 19th century. It marked the destruction of the last of the Songhay successor states, the beginning of El Hadj Umar Tall's conflict with fellow Fula Jihad leader of Macina, and a Toucouleur movement to the east under pressure from French Colonial expansion in the Senegambia.

El Hadj Umar Tall, a Toucouleur conqueror who swept across West Africa from Fouta Djallon, invaded Segou and found an already shaken Bambara Empire. Well trained, regimented, and equipped with modern firearms, Umar Tall's mujahideen readily and easily defeated the Bambara, seizing Ségou itself on March 10, 1861. Umar made his son Ahmadu Tall king or "Faama", and declared an end to the Bambara Empire. The Niger River city of Ségou became the center of the Toucouleur Jihad state, and the base for its further expansion to the east.
