= Ba Lobbo =

Ba Lobbo was the nephew of Seku Amadu, the founder of the Massina Empire. He was known as an able general, and was considered as a possible successor to Seku Amadu in 1845, but was passed up in favor of the latter's son, Amadu Seku. He was also considered as possible successor to Amadu Seku in 1853, but threw his support behind Amadu Seku's son, Amadu Amadu, who became the third ruler of Massina.

In 1862, after the fall of the Empire's capital Hamdullahi to El Hadj Umar Tall's Toucouleur Empire, Amadu Amadu was captured and executed, leaving Ba Lobbo the leader of remaining Massina forces. Assembling a force of Fulas and Kountas, he succeeded in driving Umar Tall from Hamdullahi and into the cliffs of Dogon country near Bandiagara in 1864. Although Umar Tall died there in an explosion of his gunpowder reserves, his nephew Tidiani Tall succeeded him as Toucouleur emperor, and suppressed Ba Lobbo's resistance; the Massina never regained their independence as a state.

== Notes and references ==
Citations

Sources

- Bâ, Amadou Hampâté; Daget, Jacques (1975). L’empire peul du Macina, 1818-1853. Nouvelles Editions Africaines.
