= Tidiani Tall =

Tijani Tall
- Emir
- Predecessor: Umar Tall
- Successor: Muniru
- Died: 1887; Sokoto
- Aïssatou Hayatou
- Issue: Coumba Tall: Madina Tall; Fadima Tall; Addafini Abdulahi
- Father: Alfa Amadou Tall
- Religion: Islam

Tidiani Tall (c.1840 – 1887; also spelled Tijani) was a Toucouleur leader who succeeded his uncle, El Hadj Umar Tall, as head of the Toucouleur Empire in the former Massina Empire following Umar's 1864 death near Bandiagara.

Tidiani was born the son of Alfa Amadou Tall, El Hadj Umar's elder brother. While a boy, his father went to Sokoto to visit his brother during his return from the Hajj. During the next twenty years he lived with his uncle and father in Timbo, Jégunko, and Dinguiraye, all in the Futa Jallon, as well as in Nioro du Sahel in Kaarta.

He settled with his uncle in Hamdullahi, former capital of the Massina after their victory at the battle of Taayawal in 1862. Tidiani and his cousin Muhammad Makki (c.1835- 1864)(Umar's second son) were the de facto heads of the administration there. The native Fula people, led by the prince Ba Lobbo Bari and the al-Bekkay of Timbuktu, revolted and besieged Hamdullahi from June 1863 to February 1864.

In January 1864, El-Hadji Umar sent Tijani to seek help from the Dogons of Bandiagara and to form a new army. The alliance led by Balobbo entered Hamdullahi at the beginning of February 1864, and Umar and his companions escaped on the 6th of that month. On February 11, Tidiani arrived at Déguembéré, but his uncle was already dead along with his entourage, including among others his sons Muhammad Makki, Hadi and Muhammad Mahi.

Tijani succeeded in defeating Balobbo's alliance and retaking all of Massina in 1864, and made Bandiagara his capital. He retained much of the administrative apparatus of his Fula predecessors and maintained good relations with his Dogon allies. Ahmadu Tall, Umar's eldest son and Faama of Segou, was not able to re-establish control over Tijani's portion of the empire.

Tijani died in 1887 and was succeeded by Muniru, who was eventually superseded by Ahmadu Tall after the fall of Segou to the French in 1890.

| Preceded by El-Hadj Umar Tall | Emir of the Toucouleur Masina Empire; 1864–1887 | Succeeded by Saidou Tapsirou |
