= Lake Gossi =

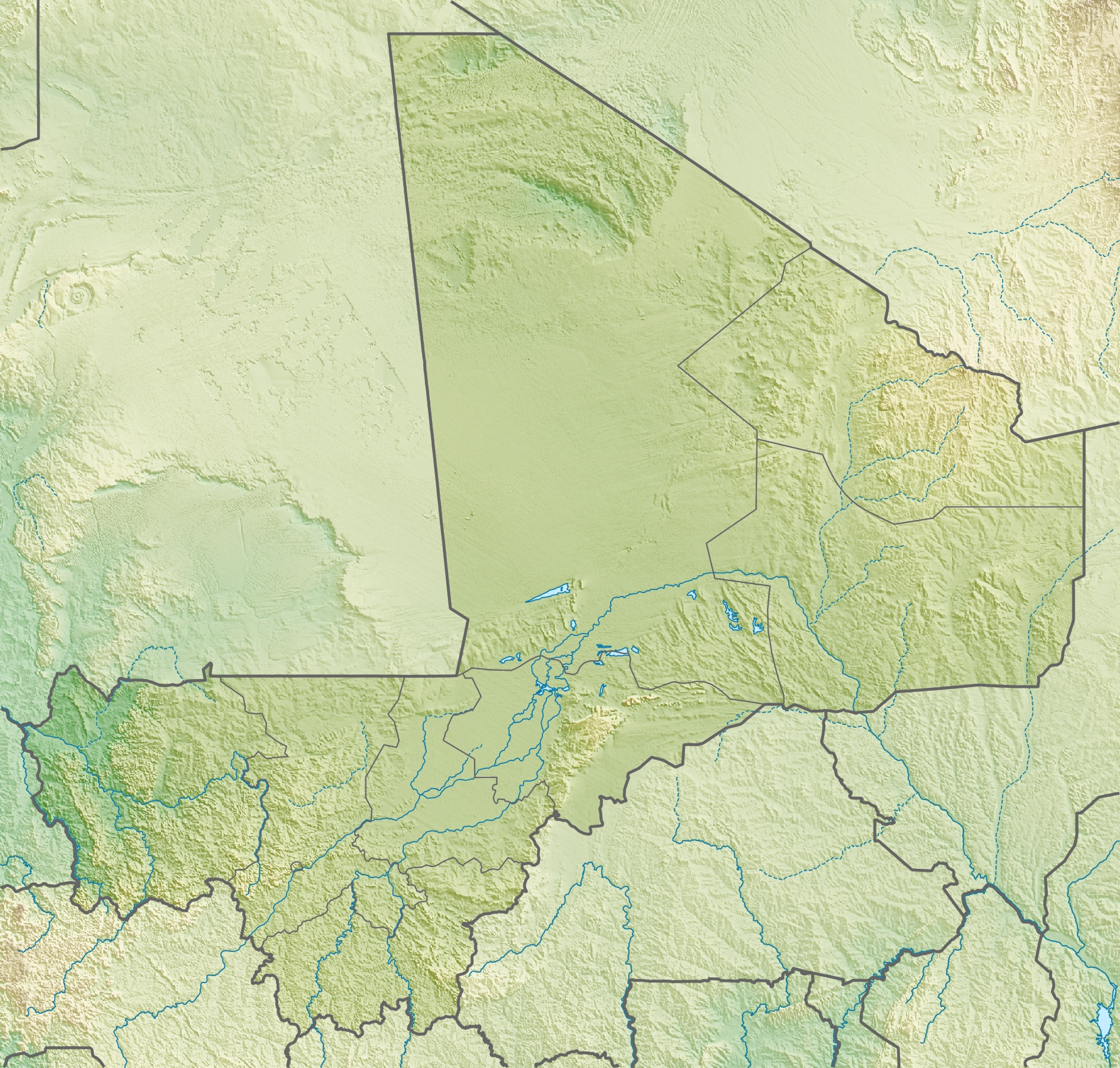
- Location within Mali
- Coordinates: 15°49′40″N 1°18′41″W
- Type: Natural freshwater lake
- Basin countries: Mali
- Max. length: 16.67 km (10.36 mi)
- Max. width: 1.33 km (0.83 mi)
- Surface elevation: 279 m (915 ft)
- Islands: numerous islands and islets, depending on how much water is in the lake
- Settlements: town of Gossi

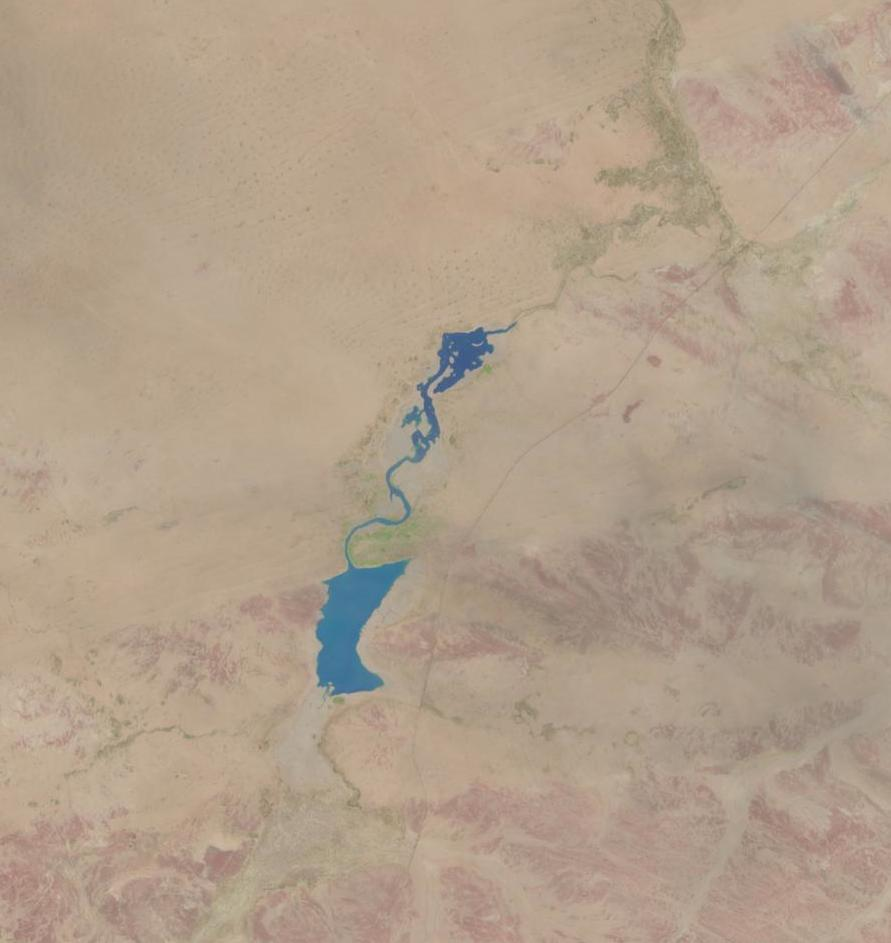
Landsat 8 natural color image of Lake Gossi and City Gossi in Mali, 2014

Lake Gossi, also known as Mare de Grossi, is a body of water near Gossi in the Cercle of Gourma-Rharous in the Tombouctou Region of Mali. The lake is near the town of Gossi.

In 1990, with lower rainfall than usual, there was competition over land use between cattle grazers and harvesting of fonio grains. Cattle spent three-quarters of their grazing time around the shores of the lake or in depressions.

During the dry season, the Tamasheq people of the region rely on the lake as an important source of water, their only alternative being pits and wells to reach groundwater that may be 50 metres (160 ft) underground.

The lake is home to a number of waterbird species.

As of 2009, the lake was sometimes visited by lone male elephants in January or February.

At the start of 1846, the forces of the Tuareg people in the Timbuktu area were surprised and defeated by a force of Fula lancers from the Massina Empire under Balobbo. As a result, for a period, Timbuktu again came under the authority of Amadu II of Masina.
