= Zawaya =

Tribes in the southern Sahara

Regions with significant populations
- Southern Sahara, especially Mauritania

Religions
- Islam

Scriptures
- Quran

Languages
- Berber, Arabic

The Zawaya are tribes in the southern Sahara who have traditionally followed a deeply religious way of life. They accepted a subordinate position to the warrior tribes, whether Arab or Berber, who had little interest in spreading Islam. The Zawaya introduced Sufi brotherhoods to the black populations south of the Sahara. The jihad movements of the Fula people in the eighteenth and nineteenth centuries have their origins with the Zawaya. Today the Zawaya are one of the castes of Mauritania.

== Background ==
The Zawaya (Note: Also, Zawāyā. The term Zawiya, plural form Zawaya, is also used in the Maghreb and West Africa for Sufi centers of religious education. The Zawaya tribes were nomadic, but followed the teachings that emanated from these centers.) were nomadic tribes from the arid lands to the north and east of the Senegal River in West Africa.

Their religious beliefs may possibly be traced back to the eleventh century Almoravid movement, although their generally more passive attitude is in contrast to that of the militant Almoravids. They gave great importance to teaching the Islamic religious sciences and to reciting the Quran.

The Zawaya attempted to avoid conflict with the stronger warrior groups by renouncing arms and paying tribute.

In the west, the Zawaya were of Berber origin, while after the fifteenth century the warrior tribes were Arab. In the center, the reverse applied. The Zawaya were Arab, while Berber or Tuareg tribes held military and political power. The Zawaya, with their passive lifestyle of herding, prayer and study, were treated with some contempt by the stronger groups, but this was mingled with respect. A story was told by the sixteenth century Timbuktu jurist al-Muṣallī, so-called because he worshiped in the mosque so often. He was a Zawaya from the west and a regular attendant at the teaching circle of the jurist Maḥmūd, grandson of Anda Ag-Muhammad in the female line. Al-Muṣallī resolved to ask for the hand of Maḥmūd's daughter in marriage. Before he could make his proposal Maḥmūd politely deflected it, saying that "birds of a feather flock together".

The separation of the tribes of this region into warrior and Zawaya tribes had probably occurred before the fifteenth century. By then some of the Zawaya were moving south to avoid the depredations of the warrior tribes, risking conflict with the sedentary populations of Chemama, Gorgol and Tagant. During the fifteenth century the Beni Ḥassān Arab nomads began to enter the region. Hassāni rulers imposed heavy tributes on the Zawaya, but did not give them effective protection against their enemies. Although subordinate to the Banū Ḥassan warriors, the Zawaya ranked above other Berbers. These in turn ranked above blacksmiths, who were said to be Jewish in origin, and mixed-race people.

== Revolt in 1673 ==
In the late seventeenth century, Awbek Ashfaga of the Banū Daymān tribe, later to style himself Nāșir al-Din ("Protector of the Faith"), emerged as a leader of the Zawaya tribes in resisting the Hassān. He was widely respected for his scholarship, purity of life and healing ability. His goal was to establish an ideal Islamic society based on the original organization of the first caliphs, where ethnic and tribal differences would be ignored. Nāșir al-Din demanded strict obedience to his authority by the Zawaya. He set out to create a secure and stable administration in the southern Sahara, led by himself, his vizier and four qāḍīs. To do so he would defeat warriors who failed to follow Islamic principles and who harmed the faithful, and would establish a theocratic state that rose above tribal divisions and followed the commands of God.

Rather than immediately attack the Hassān, in 1673 Nāșir al-Din launched his jihad with an invasion across the Senegal River into the Futa Tooro and Wolof states. This would give him control of the trade in gum with the French on the Senegal, a source of income for his new state. He then imposed the zakāt legal tax on the tributary tribes to the north of the Senegal. When one of these tribes called for assistance from the Hassān, war broke out.

Nāșir al-Din was supported by most but not all of the Zawaya, although some disputed his authority to impose the zakāt and did not assist him. There were at least three battles, in each of which the Zawaya defeated the Hassān. However, in the last battle, which probably took place in August 1674, Nāșir al-Din and many of his immediate entourage were killed.

The Zawaya elected Sīdī al-Fāḍil as Nāșir al-Din's successor, who took the name of al-Amīn.

Al-Amīn was disposed to make peace with the Hassān, and they were willing to accept his religious authority but not his right to levy the zakat. Most of the Zawaya were opposed to the peace, and deposed al-Amīn, replacing him with 'Uthmān, the former vizier and close friend of Nāșir al-Din. 'Uthmān took an aggressive stance against the Hassān, and again attempted to enforce collection of the zakāt. His tax collectors were massacred by a Trarza chief who had come to the assistance of the weaker tribes, and 'Uthmān was killed in battle by the Wolof. His successors were decisively defeated by the Hassān.

== Later history ==
Following this defeat, the Zawaya lost all temporal power and again became strictly tributary to the Hassān, and were parceled out among the Hassān groups.

They had to provide milk from their herds to the Hassān warriors and provide them with saddles. They had to let the Hassān take the first bucket of water from their wells, and had to feed and shelter Hassān women in time of need. This seems to have been a return to their condition before the revolt started. Many of the Zawaya continued their religious studies after puberty, while others engaged in commerce, agriculture, livestock management or hired out their labor where the work was consisting with their religious practices. The Zawaya were required to educate the Ḥassanī children. Although subject to the Hassān, their religious influence on their Arab masters grew.

The economic and political structure of the region changed as contact with Europeans increased. Slaves were increasingly used to mine salt and cultivate crops in the oases rather than as trade goods. The French continued to expand the gum trade, particularly after 1815. This brought increased prosperity to the Hassāni of Ida Aish, who controlled the trade to Bakel on the Senega River, and took some of the profits that the Zawaya had traditionally made from collecting and selling gum. However, a clerical leader managed to establish an alternative gum market at Medine, further upstream, competing with the Hassāni.

Both the Zawaya and the Hassāni became wealthier in slaves and material property, but a shift in the balance of power occurred as more students and clients were attracted to the Zawaya, who also acquired better arms.

The rise of the Zawaya as merchants coincided with growth in demand for religious instruction. The distinction between Zawaya and Hassāni also began to blur, as each group entered the traditional occupations of the other.

In modern Mauritania, the Zawaya and Hassāni are both considered noble castes, dominating the politics of the country.

== Wider influence ==
The Zawaya introduced sub-Saharan Africans to the two main Sufi brotherhoods. Muhammed al-Hafiz (1759/60-1830) and his people transmitted the Tijaniyyah, while the Kunta, including the scholars Shaykh Sidi Mukhtar (1729-1811) and his son Sidi Muhammad, transmitted the Qadiriyya.

There are records of Zawaya moving into the lands south of the Senegal in the seventeenth century, where they proselytized and intermarried with the local people.

Nāșir al-Din had gained support from the Torodbe clerical clan of Futa Tooro in his struggle.

After the defeat in 1674, some of the Torodbe migrated south to Bundu and some continued on to the Fouta Djallon. The Torodbe, the kinsmen of the Fulbe of the Fouta Djallon, influenced them in embracing a more militant form of Islam.

In 1726 or 1727 the Fulbe were to launch their successful jihad in the Fouta Djallon. Later the Fulbe would establish Islamic states in Futa Tooro (1776), Sokoto (1808) and Masina (1818).

In the late 1800s, Zawaya are referenced in a letter by the Kingdom of Jimma's Muslim state leader Abba Jifar II in Ethiopia to Hadiya rebel Hassan Enjamo.

The Kunta became particularly influential in the eighteenth century. Many of them moved east to the region north of Timbuktu and became salt merchants. They adopted the teachings of the fifteenth century cleric Muhammad al-Maghili, said to be the first to introduce the Qadiriyya Sufi brotherhood to the western Sudan. The Kunta produced several important clerics, of whom Sidi Mukhtar had the greatest impact. Sidi Mukhtar became the leader of a Tuareg coalition dominated by the Kunta that controlled the Niger bend and surrounding areas. He is also credited with authoring over 300 treatises. His sponsorship of the proselytizing Sufi tariqas, particularly the Qadiriyya order, meant that Islam was no longer the private religion of Saharan traders, but began to steadily spread among the black populations of the Sahel and further south.

Many West African libraries and collections of Islamic writings include works by Zawaya authors. Most of these writings are in Arabic.

Today the Zawaya continue to be in demand as teachers of the Quran in West African Islamic schools.

== Sources ==
- Amanat, Abbas; Bernhardsson, Magnus T. (2002-02-09). Imagining the End: Visions of Apocalypse from the Ancient Middle East to Modern America. I.B.Tauris. ISBN 978-1-86064-724-6.
- Fage, John D.; Tordoff, William (2002). A History of Africa. Routledge. ISBN 978-0-415-25248-5.
- Gray, Richard (1975-09-18). The Cambridge History of Africa. Cambridge University Press. p. 201. ISBN 978-0-521-20413-2.
- Hunwick, John O. (2003). Timbuktu and the Songhay Empire: Al-Sa'Di's Ta'Rikh Al-Sudan Down to 1613 and Other Contemporary Documents. BRILL. ISBN 978-90-04-12822-4.
- Isichei, Elizabeth (1997-04-13). A History of African Societies to 1870. Cambridge University Press. p. 300. ISBN 978-0-521-45599-2.
- Kane, Oumar (2004). La première hégémonie peule: le Fuuta Tooro de Koli Ten̳ella à Almaami Abdul (in French). KARTHALA Editions. ISBN 978-2-84586-521-1.
- Kane, Ousmane Oumar (2012-09-05). Non-Europhone Intellectuals. African Books Collective. ISBN 978-2-86978-506-9.
- Mohamed, Mohamed Hassan (2012-02-22). Between Caravan and Sultan: The Bayruk of Southern Morocco: A Study in History and Identity. BRILL. ISBN 978-90-04-18379-7.
- Law, Robin (2002-08-08). From Slave Trade to 'Legitimate' Commerce: The Commercial Transition in Nineteenth-Century West Africa. Cambridge University Press. p. 230. ISBN 978-0-521-52306-6.
- Stanton, Andrea L.; Ramsamy, Edward; Seybolt, Peter J.; Elliott, Carolyn M. (2012-01-05). Cultural Sociology of the Middle East, Asia, and Africa: An Encyclopedia. SAGE. ISBN 978-1-4129-8176-7.
- Willis, John Ralph (1979). Studies in West African Islamic History. Cass. p. 1. ISBN 978-0-7146-1737-4.
