= Toucouleur =

Toucouleur may be:

- Toucouleur Empire
- Toucouleur people
- Toucouleur language
