= Mabroûk, Mali =

Mabroûk
- Location within Mali
- Coordinates: 19.46583°N 1.16972°W
- Country: Mali
- Region: Tombouctou Region
- Cercle: Timbuktu Cercle

Mabroûk is a location in the Tombouctou Region of Mali. An 1880 description said the village was enclosed, with wild palms that produced inedible dates but had useful leaves and branches. Using deep wells, the inhabitants cultivated sorghum, rice, millet and wheat but not barley. Caravans from Ghadames and Rhat would pass through the village, carrying goods from the eastern Sudan to Araouane, five days journey away. The journey from Mabroûk to Timbuktu was over a sandy plain with wells along the way, but they would not be found every day.

The noted Zawāyā cleric Sidi al-Mukhtar al-Kunti (1729-1811) was born in the Erg Oralla region to the north of Mabroûk.
