= Seku Amadu =

Fulbe founder of the Massina Empire

- شيخ أحمد بن محمّد لبّو

Almami of the Caliphate of Hamdullahi
- In office c. 1818 – 1845
- Succeeded by: Amadu II

Personal details
- Born: Ahmadu mo Muḥammadu mo Abi Bakr Lobbo Barry c. 1776
- Died: 20 April 1845 (aged 68–69)
- Occupation: Cleric
- Known for: Founder of the Caliphate of Hamdullahi

Sheikhu Ahmadu (Arabic: شيخ أحمد بن محمّد لبّو, romanized: Shaykh Aḥmadu bin Muḥammadu Lobbo; Fula: Seeku Aamadu; (Note: Shaykh Ahmadu ibn Muhammadu Lobbo: "Shaykh" (or Seku) is the title of a religious leader. Ahmadu was his given name, Muhammadu was his father's name, Lobbo a secondary given name common in the family and Barry was his family name)) (c. 1776 – 20 April 1845) was the Fulbe founder of the Massina Empire (Diina of Hamdullahi) in the Inner Niger Delta, now the Mopti Region of Mali. He ruled as Almami from 1818 until his death in 1845, also taking the title sisse al-Masini.

== Early years ==
Aḥmad bin Muḥammad Būbū bin Abī Bakr bin Sa'id al-Fullānī (Fula: Aamadu Hammadi Buubu) was born around 1776 and was raised by Hamman Lobbo, his father's younger brother. Amadu was a pupil of the Qadiriyya Sufi teacher Sidi Mukhtar al-Kunti. In the Inner Niger Delta region, alliances of Fulbe traders ruled the towns like Djenné, but non-Moslem Bambara people controlled the river. The Fulbe ardo'en were tributary to the Bambara of Ségou, and practiced a form of Islam that was far from pure.

Seku Amadu may have served in the Sokoto jihad before returning to the Massina region. He settled in a village under the authority of Djenné. When his teaching brought him a large following he was expelled, and moved to Sebera, under Massina. Again he built a large following and again he was expelled. Shaykh Usman dan Fodio, who founded the Sokoto Caliphate in Hausaland in 1809, authorized him to carry out jihad in region. Originally his conquests were to have been included in the western part of the Sokoto Caliphate under Abdullahi dan Fodio of Gwandu. As with other jihad leaders, Seku Amadu received a flag from Usman dan Fodio as a visible symbol of his authority.

== Jihad ==
Amadu's views brought him into conflict with his local, pagan Fulani chief, who called for help from his suzerain, the Bambara king of Segu. The result was a general uprising under Amadou that established the Massina Empire, a theocratic Muslim Fulani state throughout the Inner Niger Delta region and extending to both the ancient Muslim centers of Djenné and Timbuktu. Amadu's jihad was probably continuous from 1810 through 1818. However, some sources suggest two events, one in 1810 and another in 1818. One estimate suggests a total of 10,000 deaths resulting from this jihad.

Seku Amadu accused the local Fulbe rulers of idolatry, and at first the jihad was directed at them. The scope was soon extended to include the Bambara and other pagan groups in the region. Seku Amadu was supported by Tukolors and other Fulbe people in Massina, escaped slaves and others looking for freedom from their Bambara masters. Among the Fulbe, Seku Amadu was supported by literate Muslims, formerly nomadic, who were influenced by the Sufi revival and were enthusiastic about Islamic reform.

In his jihad he first defeated the Segu army, then captured Djenné, whose scholars welcomed him. He was invited to take control of Massina after a Fulbe revolt in that town. By 1818 he had won control of both Djenné and Massina. In Djenné, and later in Timbuktu, the temporal leader was overthrown and replaced by scholars, while the Fulba Dikko clan became the regional power. Seku Amadu founded a capital for his new Massina Empire called Hamdullahi ("Praise God!"), northeast of Djenné, just south of the present day city of Mopti. The capital was established in 1819. He set himself up as an independent ruler.

== Massina Empire ==
Seku Amadu's theocratic state controlled the Inner Niger Delta, and exerted some authority over the nearby Timbuktu, Ségou and Kaarta. One of the main religious leaders of the jihad in Massina was Muḥammad al-Tāhir, also a student of al-Mukhtār al-Kunti. He issued a manifesto in which he declared that Seku Amadu was the spiritual heir of Askia Mohammad I, the sixteenth century ruler of the Songhai Empire. This was generally accepted in the Timbuktu region. There was little resistance to Timbuktu's informal incorporation into the new Massina empire, which soon became a center of Islamic learning. However, Seku Amadu gradually alienated the leaders of Timbuktu and of Sokoto by his extremely rigorous theology, and by his failure to treat the senior Qadiriyya leaders with the respect that they felt was their due. He also assumed the title of Commander of the Faithful in the Sudan, which the Sokoto caliph considered to be his by right. He adversely affected the trade of both Jenne and Timbuktu.

The clerical leader of Timbuktu, Sidi Muḥammad bin al-Mukhtār al-Kunti, died in 1825/6. Seku Amadu asked for formal recognition of his sovereignty over the city. He sent an emissary with a large body of troops to al-Qā'id 'Uthmān bin Bābakr, the temporal ruler, asking him to give up use of the drum and other forms of ceremony, to which 'Uthmān agreed. In 1833 'Uthmān threw off his allegiance and marched against Hamdullahi, but was defeated. However, Sidi al-Muhtar al-Saghir, the spiritual leader of Timbuktu, arranged a truce between the Tuareg and Ahmadu Lobbo under which his Fulbe forces would not occupy Timbuktu. Fines were levied against those who had participated in attack on Hamdullahi.

Seku Amadu Lobbo died on 20 April 1845, leaving control of the Massina Empire to his son, Amadu II. Under his son, Timbuktu was included in the empire for some time. Aḥmadu bin Aḥmadu Lobbo ruled over Massina from 1844 to 1852. The period of stability lasted until the Jihad led by El Hadj Umar Tall in 1862 overthrew Aḥmadu's grandson, Amadu III, and threw the region into chaos.

== Policy and influence ==
Seku Amadu ruled through a system of provincial governors, mostly his relatives, and a central council of forty elders. In Seku Amadu's theocratic state the law was based on strict observance of the Maliki interpretation of Sharia law. Qadis administered the Sharia in each province, playing an important role in the state. The rigid conformance to the law led one authority to call Masina "as near the ideal nomocratic state as is likely to be achieved."

Seku Amadu followed a policy of settling the formerly nomadic herders. He made vigorous efforts to promote Islam. Under Seku Aḥmadu Lobbo and his heirs, the Niger bend region was stable and trade flourished. However, some tension was caused by the extremely puritan attitudes of the rulers, such as banning the use of tobacco and requiring full segregation of women from men, counter to Tuareg custom.

At the height of the Empire's power, a 10,000 man army was stationed in the city, and Seku Aḥmadu ordered the construction of six hundred madrasas to further the spread of Islam. He also ordered alcohol, tobacco, music and dancing banned in accordance with Islamic law, and constructed a social welfare system to provide for widows, orphans, and the poor.

One of the most enduring results of his rule was a pastoral code regulating access to and use of the inland Niger delta region by Fula cattle herders and diverse farming communities.

== Notes and references ==
Notes

Citations

Sources

- De Bruijn, Mirjam; van Dijk, Han (2001). "Ecology and power in the periphery of Maasina: The case of the Hayre in the nineteenth century" (PDF). Journal of African History. 42 (2): 217–238. doi:10.1017/S0021853701007873. PMID 18551801. S2CID 145662350.
- Hiskett, H. (1976). "The nineteenth-century jihads in West Africa". In Fage, John Donnelly; Oliver, Roland Anthony (eds.). The Cambridge History of Africa (Volume 5). Cambridge University Press. pp. 125–169. ISBN 978-0-521-20701-0.
- Hunwick, John O. (2003). Arabic Literature of Africa (Volume 4). Brill. ISBN 978-90-04-12444-8.
- Hunwick, John (2004). "Mukhtar ibn Ahmad, al-". In Jestice, Phyllis G. (ed.). Holy People of the World: A Cross-Cultural Encyclopedia. ABC-CLIO. ISBN 978-1-57607-355-1.
- Okoth, Assa (2006). A History of Africa (Volume 1 1800-1915). Nairobi: East African Publishers. ISBN 978-9966-25-357-6.
- Saad, Elias N. (1983). Social History of Timbuktu: The Role of Muslim Scholars and Notables, 1400-1900. Cambridge University Press. ISBN 978-0-521-24603-3.
- Vikør, Knut S. (1999). "Jihād in West Africa". In Manger, Leif O. (ed.). Muslim Diversity: Local Islam in Global Contexts. Psychology Press. pp. 80–101. ISBN 978-0-7007-1104-8.
- Wilks, Ivor (1989). Asante in the Nineteenth Century: The Structure and Evolution of a Political Order. CUP Archive. p. 314. ISBN 978-0-521-37994-6.

Further reading

- Bâ, Amadou Hampaté; Daget, Jacques (1984) [1955], L'empire peul du Macina: 1818-1853 (in French), Abidjan: Nouvelles Éditions Africaines.
- Brown, William A. (1968), "Toward a chronology for the Caliphate of Hamdullahi (Māsina)", Cahiers d'études africaines, 8 (31): 428–434, doi:10.3406/cea.1968.3136.
- Brown, William A. (1969), The caliphate of Hamdullahi, 1818-1864: study in African history and tradition (PhD thesis), Madison: University of Wisconsin.
- Sanankoua, Bintou (1990), Un Empire peul au XIXe siècle: la Diina du Maasina (in French), Paris: Karthala, ISBN 2-86537-234-0
