= Mukhtar al-Kunti =

Sidi al-Mukhtar ibn Ahmad al-Kunti
- Born: 1729
- Died: 1811 (aged 81–82)
- Occupation: Imam
- Known for: Qadiriyya leader

Sidi al-Mukhtar ibn Ahmad al-Kunti (Note: Sidi al-Mukhtar ibn Ahmad al-Kunti: "Mukhtar" was his given name, "Ahmad" his father's name and "Kunta" the name of his family. He is often called "Shaykh Mukhtar" or "Sidi Mukhtar". "Shaykh" is a title given to religious leaders. "Sidi" means "Saint" or "Blessed".) (1729–1811) was a leading ʻalim of the Qadiriyya movement in the Western Sudan who played an important role in promoting the spread of Islam in West Africa in the nineteenth century.

== Origins ==
Al-Mukhtar ibn Ahmad al-Kunti was born in 1729 in the Erg Oralla region to the north of Mabroûk, Mali.

His family belonged to the Zawāyā, a group of tribes that had abandoned violence and self-defense in favor of a peaceful life of religious devotions and herding, paying tribute to the warrior groups to avoid molestation. He was a member of the influential Kunta clerical tribe, originally Arab descendants of Uqba ibn Navi Al Fihri. Many of the Kunta moved east to the region north of Timbuktu and became salt merchants. The Kunta adopted the teachings of Muhammad al-Maghili, a noted cleric around 1500 CE who was said to have introduced the Qadiriyya order of Sufis to the region.

Al-Mukhtar's father died when he was ten.

Other members of his family assisted in his education, as did members of the Kel al-Suq and Kel Hurma families. His main teacher was Shaykh Sidi Ali bin al-Najib of Araouane, a leading Qadiriyya cleric.

For a period, he was caretaker of the tomb near Oualata of Sidi Ahmed al-Kunti (aka al-Bakka'i Bu Dam'a, Arabic: سيدي أحمد الكنتي البكاي بودمعة), a Kunta saint who had died in 1515.

John Hunwick suggested that between 1754 and 1757 al-Mukhtar studied in Morocco. He married a distant cousin on his return. However, this is inconsistent with primary sources on the scholar's life, including his son's hagiography. Al-Mukhtār did not leave West Africa in his education, or in the rest of his life.

== Career ==
Al-Mukhtar succeeded Sidi Ali as Shaykh when he died. He made his base at Azawad, about 250 miles (400 km) to the northeast of Timbuktu. From Azawad he mediated in tribal disputes, particularly between the Kunta and the Barabish. Al-Mukhtar al-Kunti had outstanding leadership abilities in addition to his scholarship and spiritual qualities. Starting in 1757, already recognized as the leader of the Kunta and soon by all the other Qadiri shaykhs, he became increasingly involved in resolving disputes among the Tuareg people of the region.

Eventually al-Mukhtar came to be the recognized spiritual leader in a large region around the bend of the Niger River. In this area the Iwellemmedan people were the dominant warriors and the Kunta dominated trade as well as providing religious leadership.

He gave spiritual advice to the Ullimiden tribal chief Kawa Ag Amma.

He died at the age of 82 in 1226 AH (1811 CE) and was succeeded by his son Muhammad and then his grandson Ahmed al-Bakkay.

== Influence ==
Al-Mukhtar al-Kunti was a prolific author, said to have written three hundred treatises on aspects of Islam and its practices.

He saw himself as a mujaddid, and thought that he was inspired by the Prophet, who had appeared to him and said, "you are the true messenger to renovate my Way." In his writings he is strongly opposed to such things as charms and amulets, and to the growing numbers of mallams primarily interested in money.

Al-Mukhtar al-Kunti strongly believed that a shaykh should lead by example, following a pure asceticism informed by Islamic truth. He corresponded widely with other scholars in the arid and semi-arid lands that extend from the Kanem–Bornu Empire in the east to the Atlantic coast.

Al-Mukhtar's huge moral influence and support for the Qadiriyya tariqa meant that Islam expanded its role in the region beyond that of the private religion of merchants and scholars. The tariqa members were required to spread the message among the pagans of one God to whom all men were subordinate. Mukhtar al-Kunti trained clerics so they could establish Islamic schools in the pagan countries, and these schools could in turn spread the word further.

In response to a question on the status of the Fula people, Sidi al-Mukhtar explicitly refused to acknowledge any difference between blacks and whites.

Al-Mukhtar's pupil Shaykh Sīdyā al-Kabīr was an influential Qadiriyya cleric in Mauritania. In the Ségou Empire, his pupil Bakari was assassinated because he was unwilling to compromise with paganism.

Al-Mukhtar taught both Usman dan Fodio and Seku Amadu of the Massina Empire.

Usman dan Fodio looked up to al-Mukhtar as a teacher, and al-Mukhtar reportedly threw his support behind Usman in the campaign in which he founded the Sokoto Caliphate in 1809, saying "Usman ibn Fudi is one of the accomplished saints; his jihad is just."

== Notes and references ==
Notes

Citations

Sources

- Ajayi, Jacob F. Ade (1989). Africa in the Nineteenth Century Until the 1880s. University of California Press. p. 541. ISBN 978-0-520-03917-9.
- Fage, John D.; Tordoff, William (2002). A History of Africa. Routledge. ISBN 978-0-415-25248-5.
- Hall, Bruce S. (2011-06-06). A History of Race in Muslim West Africa, 1600-1960. Cambridge University Press. ISBN 978-1-139-49908-8.
- Hunwick, John (2004). "Mukhtar ibn Ahmad, al-". Holy People of the World: A Cross-Cultural Encyclopedia. ABC-CLIO. ISBN 978-1-57607-355-1.
- Willis, John Ralph (1979). Studies in West African Islamic History. Cass. p. 6. ISBN 978-0-7146-1737-4.
- Willis, John Ralph (1989). In the Path of Allah: The Passion of Al-Hajj ʻUmar : an Essay Into the Nature of Charisma in Islam. Psychology Press. ISBN 978-0-7146-3252-0.
