= Battle of Cayawal =

- Part of the Umarian jihad
- A map of the Upper Niger in 1862, with Cayawal highlighted for reference.
Date	May 10 – May 15, 1862
Location	Cayawal (near Jenne, Mali)
Result	Toucouleur victory

Belligerents
Toucouleur Empire	Massina Empire

Commanders and leaders
Omar Saidou Tall	Amadu III (WIA); Mamudu

Strength
30,000 soldiers	50,000 soldiers (most without modern firearms)

Casualties and losses
10,000 dead	30,000 dead

The Battle of Cayawal (also known as Tyayafal or Thiayewal) was a six day long battle between forces of the Umarian State (Toucouleur Empire) and the Massina Empire (Caliphate of Hamdullahi). It pitted the invading Umarian army of Omar Tall against those of Amadu III. The battle was a crushing victory for Umarian forces, leading to the disintegration of the Massina Empire a month later.

== Background ==
Omar Tall was a Tijaniyyah leader from the 19th century who led a Fulbe jihad in the Senegambia region and Mali. Starting with his rebellion at Dinguiraye in September 1852, he progressively conquered the states of Tambo, Bundu, Khasso and Kaarta as part of a jihad. Following a period of recruiting in Futa Toro during 1858 and 1859, he turned his attention to the Bamana Empire, whose capital Segou was lauded as the 'city of Paganism' by his forces.

Following the capture of Segou by Umarian forces, the Faama (ruler) of Bamana, Bina Ali, would take the unprecedented step of swearing allegiance to the Massina Empire. Prior to the Umarian invasion, the two states were long-time enemies, with the ruler of Massina Amadu III leading yearly attacks into Bamana territory. Such a move complicated Omar's Jihad since Massina was another jihad state of the 19th century. To attack this fellow Islamic state of Massina required novel theological arguments on Omar's end, which he duly delivered in 1861 in a work known as the Bayan. On April 13, 1862, Omar set out from Segou into the Massina Empire.

== Battle ==
On Saturday, May 10th, the Umarian and Bamana forces sighted each other at Cayawal and prepared for battle. Umarian forces numbered 30,000 soldiers armed primarily with rifles. Bamana forces numbered 50 000 soldiers and cavalry armed mostly with swords, spears and bows.

On the first day of battle, both sides took heavy losses. Tales of heroism emerged on both sides, with Amadu III leading the battle on the Massina western flank and Batu, a prominent Umarian soldier, fighting until he collapsed from eighteen spear wounds. Nonetheless on Sunday, Omar opted for a protracted battle, with the next four days spent harassing Massina forces in small skirmishes.

After four days of skirmishing, Omar opted for a decisive attack against Massina forces on Thursday, May 15. A defector close to the royal court of Massina had entered Omar's camp and gave detailed plans on enemy positions. To increase the potency of Umarian firearms, their cavalry units were dismounted and fought on foot. When the Umarian forces engaged, Massina forces were caught off guard. Umarian firearms proved decisive, with large losses suffered by Massina forces. Eventually, a wounded Amadu III abandoned the battlefield with his servants, fleeing by boat up the Niger. With this, Umarian forces had come out on top.

== Aftermath ==
The battle would be the deadliest battle of Omar's entire jihad by a wide margin. Massina forces suffered 30,000 dead while Umarian forces suffered 10,000. It effectively ended large-scale resistance on the Massinanke side. As such, the Massina capital of Hamdullahi lay defenseless in the battle's aftermath, and Omar Tall duly entered it on the 16th or 17th of May. Amadu III would fight multiple additional battles against Umarian forces following his flight, but would find no fortune as he suffered continuous defeats. Eventually, he would be caught by Umarian forces at Mopti in the end of June and be executed soon afterwards.

== Sources ==
- Robinson, David (1985). The Holy War of Umar Tal: The Western Sudan in the mid-Nineteenth Century. Oxford: the Clarendon Press.
- Oloruntimehin, B. O. (1972). The Segu Tukulor Empire. London: Longman.
- Sanankoua, Bintou (1990). Un Empire peul au XIXe siècle : la Diina du Maasina. Paris: Karthala.
