= Operation Tiésaba-Bourgou =

Multinational joint military operations

- Part of Mali War
Date	March 25-April 11, 2019
Location	Foulsaré and Serma forests, Mopti region, Mali
Result	Franco-Malian victory

Belligerents
France; Mali	Jama'at Nasr al-Islam wal Muslimin: Katiba Gourma; Ansarul Islam

Strength
~850: 700 French troops; 150 Malian troops	Unknown

Casualties and losses
1 killed, 1 injured None	15 killed (per Mali); 30 "neutralized" (per France)

Operation Tiésaba-Bourgou was a joint Franco-Malian operation against Jama'at Nasr al-Islam wal Muslimin and Ansarul Islam near the Malian, Burkinabe, and Nigerien borders.

== Prelude ==
France's Operation Barkhane and the Malian Army, since 2013, have been fighting jihadist groups in the remote parts of southern Mali, including Ménaka Cercle and Ansongo Cercle. In late March 2019, the French Chief of Staff, François Lecointre, announced that Franco-Malian forces managed to clear Menaka cercle from the Islamic State in the Greater Sahara (ISGS), and a contingent of 500 French troops moved to the Liptako-Gourma area near the tri-border area. Lecointre stated that after Malian control of the Menaka cercle, Franco-Malian forces were going to Gourma to clear out remaining jihadist areas.

Despite French attacks, the Serma and Foulsaré forests prior to the operation were hotspots of jihadist activities, with groups like Katiba Gourma, allied with JNIM, Ansarul Islam, and ISGS all harboring fighters in the areas. The Franco-Malian forces gathered three French companies and two Malian companies, which included 700 French soldiers and 150 Malian soldiers. The Burkinabe Army also deployed forces south of the Malian-Burkinabe border, to prevent the jihadist groups from fleeing south. A new camp was also established at Gossi, used as the headquarters of the operation.

== Operation ==
The operation began on March 25, from Hombori. However, most operations were delayed for 48 hours due to bad weather. The first actions began at the Foulsaré forest, when French drones launched airstrikes on jihadist positions. on March 29 and 30. On April 2, a French vehicle hit an IED in the Foulsaré forest, injuring two soldiers, one of whom succumbed to his injuries. The attack was claimed by JNIM on April 7. That same day, the first operations began against jihadist groups in the Serma forest, including one against a training camp south of Boni. Battles also broke out between Malian forces and jihadists in the village of Petedougou, on the Burkinabe border.

In mid-April, the jihadists in the Foulsaré forest fled without fighting. French forces who investigated the jihadist camps stated that weapons, vehicles, and a logistics network were discovered. By April 11, the jihadists in the Serma forest had fled.

== Aftermath ==
The Malian government stated on April 8 that 15 jihadists were killed in the operation, along with dozens of weapons and vehicles captured. On April 11, the French government stated thirty jihadists were "neutralized". One French soldier was killed, and one was injured in the fighting.
