= Nyamina =

- Commune and town
- Location in Mali
- Coordinates: 13°19′0″N 6°58′55″W
- Country: Mali
- Region: Koulikoro Region
- Cercle: Koulikoro Cercle

Area
  - Total: 1,283 km^{2} (495 sq mi)

Population (2009 census)
  - Total: 35,548
  - Density: 27.71/km^{2} (71.76/sq mi)
- Time zone: UTC+0 (GMT)

Nyamina is a small town and rural commune in the Cercle of Koulikoro in the Koulikoro Region of south-western Mali. The commune lies to the north of the Niger River and covers an area of 1,283 km^{2}. It includes the town of Nyamina and 47 villages. In the 2009 census the commune had a population of 35,548. The town lies on the left bank of the river, 80 km northeast of Koulikoro.

== History ==
According to the oral histories of the local Marka people, Nyamina was founded sometime between the 11th and 13th centuries, after the fall of the Wagadu Empire. It was the main commercial center of the region during the early decades of the Segou Empire, dominating the salt trade but also hosting important markets for slaves, firearms, cloth, and horses. The town was governed by the Diarra clan, and ruled over an area extending westwards to Kolokani and Kati. When the Niare clan, allies of Biton Coulibaly the ruler of Segou, established Bamako, Sokolono Diarra attempted to expel them but was defeated and killed.

In 1794, during the civil war following faama Ngolo Diarra's death, Nyamina was sacked and was overtaken in importance by Sansanding, further downstream.

Nyamina fell to El Hadj Omar Tall without a fight on 25 May 1860 during his campaign to integrate Segou into the Toucouleur Empire. The chaos following the Bamana collapse and Tall's death in 1864 severely restricted river trade, with Nyamina as the furthest upstream point that traders could safely visit. Riverine traffic in general declined precipitously, replaced by overland trade from Nioro du Sahel and the upper Senegal River to Segou.

A Bambara rebellion in Beledougou broke out, which raged for decades and caused the temporary abandonment of the town. In 1884 the rebels defeated a Toucouleur army at Nyamina, preventing an invasion of Beledougou from Segou.

In May 1889, Louis Archinard built a fortified post at Nyamina. This secured French contact with their Bambara allies. The next year, they completed the conquest of Segou.
