= Kunta (tribe) =

Arab tribe

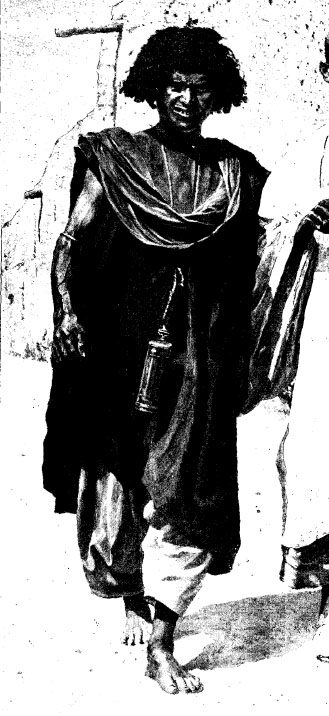
A Kunta man in the Timbuktu region c. 1908.

The Kountas or Kuntas (singular: Elkentawi or Alkanata) are described originally as Arabs, descendants of Uqba ibn Nafi. The Kunta tribe are also considered to have roots to Sidi Ahmed al-Bakkay, the founder, who died in the early 16th century. The Kunta originated in Qayrawan.

The Kunta was formed during the 15th (9th Hijri) or possibly during the 16th (10th Hijri) century. They were located in the north-west side of Sahara. The Kounta were instrumental in the expansion of Islam into sub-Saharan West Africa in the 15th century, and formed an urban elite in cities such as Timbuktu which were on the southern end of the Trans-Saharan trade. The Kunta are better known for their role as Islamic scholars. From Timbuktu, the Kunta were able to exert an enormous influence on the development of Islam in West Africa. They established a different clerical identity. They also did not use weapons when spreading the word of Islam. They are a large religious clan whose relations are the product of struggling and managing to deal with pressures such as invasions and droughts.

The Kunta tribe separated into two groups. One group went into the west while the second group moved to the Central Western Sahara and the South Western Sahara. The Kunta hold a role of prominence in the Southern Sahara that can be traced back to many centuries ago. They gained prominence in the Azawad during the lifetime of Sīdī al-Mukhtār al-Kuntī (d. 1811) and his child, Sīdī Muhammad (d. 1826).

"Kunta" is an Arabic word (كُنْتَ), meaning "you were," (2nd person, male).

== Modern history ==
Starting from the 15th century and going onward, the Kunta took the Qur'anic scholarship as "a means to wealth and therefore power as controllers of the trans-Saharan trade from Morocco to Timbuktu". This enabled the Kunta to control Qur'anic education.

During the 18th century, Timbuktu was under Kunta rule. The Kunta had a well-respected leader named Sīdī al-Mukhtār. Under the command of Shaykh Sidi al-Mukhtar in the second half of the 18th century the Kunta were successful. Sīdī al-Mukhtār helped settle the Kunta's quarrels especially among the pastoral tribes. This led the Kunta to have a great influence on commerce and urban society. They also have had great influence in northern and western Africa. In the eighteenth and nineteenth centuries, the Kunta tribe were perhaps the most prolific of any group in producing written materials.

During the 19th century, the Kunta tribe were in charge of looking after transactions in Tuat and Taoudeni known as Algeria. The Kunta clan were known to be powerful. They were part of an important lineage such as Hassan, Quraysh, Znaga and Tajakanet origin. This benefited them in areas such as religious, political and commercial advantages. They were good with the trans-Saharan trade. A few of the Kunta people were either city officials or bureaucrats.

The nomadic Kunta occupied two regions around the Niger Bend at this time: A small group in Gourma (right bank of the Niger) at Kagha (east of Timbuktu) and around Lake Garou, and a larger group north of the river between Bamba and Bourem. While the nomadic Kunta clans were "pacified" early by French colonial forces, the urban Kounta trading and religious groups to the east were instrumental in the Fulani Jihad States of the Sokoto Caliphate, Macina, and the Segou Tijaniyya Jihad state of Umar Tall.

Some leaders of the Kunta in northeast Mali have come into conflict with Tuareg and Bambara populations in towns where they once held a near monopoly on political power. In 1998–1999 and again in 2004, there were brief flare-ups of intercommunal violence between these groups near Gao and Timbuktu, a rare event in postcolonial Mali. There has even been a small ethnic Kounta insurgency, begun in 2004 by a former Army Colonel, though few attacks have been staged, and the leadership has been largely rejected by the Kunta community.

The Kuntas are described as a high-caste tribe whose political and economic pre-eminence in the region comes from their assumed descent from the Prophet. They have a leading economic position in the area of Northern Mali since the start of the 20th century. Due to their family networks, the Kunta controlled the trading routes across the borders, especially towards Algeria.

== Culture, customs, and religion ==
- Women in the Kunta tribe are treated differently from men. Kunta women are not permitted to travel during peaceful times. If they are married, then they will be more secluded inside their compounds, that their husband owns.
- Once bride-wealth is paid, Kunta husbands owe no obligations to their mothers-in-law.
- Kunta women have to dress with modesty meaning they were more restrictive in their clothing. They have to wear a hijab to cover their faces. Kunta people dress a certain way in order to follow the teachings of Islam. They wear a formal robe to show modesty.
- The Kunta were able to maintain their genealogical purity from the time of Uqba ibn Nafi' until the time of Sīdī Ahmed al-Bakka'T Bu Dam because they had a practice of killing off all children except for one. The child who was chosen by the father as his successor got to live.
- The Kunta were against secular education, particularly for girls, they feared that educated women would demand more participation in religion and governance. The Kunta also feared competition from secular schools with their Qur'anic education.
- The Kunta is one of the two major Arab confederations. The Kuntas traditionally have been pillars of the Sufi Islam generally associated with the region. The Kunta are influenced by pan-Islamist reformist piety movements.

== Relationships ==
=== Tuareg ===
The Kunta and the Tuareg have had an entangled relationship for at least a millennium. The Kunta and Tuareg have cultural ties but also have political tensions. In the early 20th century, the Tuareg and Kunta had economic inequalities because of the French, who armed the Kunta in order to conquer the local resisting Tuareg groups.

In a small rural community in Northern Mali the two group's relationship can be characterized as both conflicting and cooperative. Tuareg and Kunta relations have both mutual dependence and close cooperation in intermarriages, trading, and Qur'anic consultations. Even though, the Tuareg view themselves as a community distinct from the Kunta Arabs, the Kunta are more economically prosperous and politically dominant than many Tuareg in that region. The Kunta marabouts (Islamic scholars) interpret the Qur'an for some Tuareg residents in the community. As helpful as this may be to the Tuareg, they also see the marabouts as trouble.

Kunta groups of prestigious marabouts who dominate some parts of northern Mali economically, religiously, and politically offer higher bridewealth than most of the poorer Tuareg men can afford. This causes the Tuareg to resent Kunta men for stealing all the most beautiful women and not needing these wives to perform laborious domestic work. A few Tuareg women see these marriages as prestigious and advantageous since it frees them from arduous physical labor.

The Kunta and the Tuareg men have long competed over women to marry, interpretations of Islam, water, and for the fertility of humans, crops, and livestock.

=== French and Iwellemmedan ===
The Kunta and the French had a great relationship with each other due to their commercial interests. The Kunta had a very good view from the French especially before the French colonial occupation because Ahmad al-Bakkay al Kunti vowed to protect Hienrich Barth as he had visited Timbuktu in the year 1826.

In the year 1895 to 1896, Hourst (Lieutenant de vaisseau) made a trip to Niger having a great encounter with the Kunta. Hourst saw that the Kunta were a clan that have good relationships with one another. The Kunta saw that having a relationship with the French would help them deal with authority as it has been decreasing since the passing of Ahmad al Bakkay's death.

The Kunta were located in two known areas as one group lived in the Goruma along the Niger River at Kagha and east of Timbuktu. The other larger group were in the left bank of Haoussa to the north of the Niger River. French didn't need the Kunta group located in Goruma but rather needed an alliance with the Kunta group located in the north part of the river for political benefits. That same year, prior to the colonial occupation, Abidin al- Kunti and his sons had opposed this but it didn't stop the French-Kunta alliance to occur. The Kunta wanted to regain power and go against the Tuareg for having weakened their power by the second half of the 19th century. In the year 1899, the Kunta moved towards a formal alliance with the French by going to Timbuktu in person to show their seriousness in wanting to work with them. In the meeting, they gave valuable information on the Tuareg clan for the French to use. They also were willing to have their own people fight the Tuareg and accept the French occupation. The French were encouraging the Kunta to attack Iwellemmedan in order for them to accept this new colonial. They formed raids against them and took their goods as well as their slaves. Hammadi ould Muhammad Bu-Addi was an important figure to this alliance and he was known to the French as Hammadi. Kunta under the French colonial didn't pay tax until 1905. In 1911, Alouata replaced Hammadi as the Kunta leader.

In 1903, the Iwellemmedan officially surrendered under the French colonial but it didn't stop the tensions between the Kunta and Iwellemmedan. The Kunta had benefited more than the French but in 1903, the French still allowed the Kunta to attack them. The conflicts with one another didn't stop even with the effort of the French trying to put this conflict to an end. The Kunta had attacked the Iwellemmedan group killing 20 people. On December 25, 1908, there was a meeting with the Kunta, Iwellemmedan and Kel Ifoghas to settle their differences. They created separate zones for pasture for each one. In 1909, the French formed buffer zones separating Kunta and Iwellemmedan. This didn't put an end to the violence, in 1911 the Iwellemmedan raided the Kunta leaving 13 people dead.

=== Faidherbe ===
Faidherbe had established permanent relations with one Kunta fragment in the early nineteenth century. Faidherbe attracted a number of Kunta clerics and merchants, he signed a treaty of peace and commerce with one of their representatives from Timbuktu.

== See also ==
- Kunta family – an ethnic Kounta clan network influential in the history of religion, trade and politics of the western Sahel.
