= Mademba Sy =

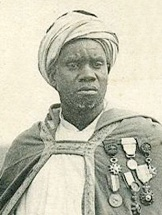
Mademba Sy

Faama Mademba Sy was a king of Sansanding, in what is today Mali.

The French colonial administration placed him as 'chief' of Massina after its conquest in the 1890s, in the new kingdom of Sansanding. In 1899 he was famously brought before a French military court on charges that he abused his authority, but he kept political support until his death.
