= Sansanding =

- Commune and town
- Location in Mali
- Coordinates: 13°43′36″N 6°0′21″W
- Country: Mali
- Region: Ségou Region
- Cercle: Ségou Cercle

Area
  - Total: 315 km^{2} (122 sq mi)
- Elevation: 283 m (928 ft)

Population (2009 census)
  - Total: 23,109
  - Density: 73.4/km^{2} (190/sq mi)
  - Ethnicities: Soninke Marka
- Time zone: UTC+0 (GMT)

Sansanding, sometimes called Sinsani, is a small town and rural commune in the Cercle of Ségou in the Ségou Region of southern-central Mali. The commune includes the town and 17 of the surrounding villages in an area of 315 square kilometers. In the 2009 census it had a population of 23,109. The town sits on the left (north) bank of the River Niger about 50 km downstream from Ségou.

The commune lies entirely to the north of the river and is crossed, from west to east, by the Canal Macina and the Fala de Boky-Wéré which carry water from the Niger to the rice polders north of Macina. The canal and Fala form part of the Office du Niger irrigation scheme.

== History ==
According to the oral histories of the local Marka people, Sansanding was founded by al-hajj Alpha Mamadu Kuma sometime between the 11th and 13th centuries, after the fall of the Wagadu Empire. Its first appearance in written records dates to 1644, when the town was visited by Abderrahmane Es Saâdi.

Sansanding was a major commercial center under the Bamana Empire, particularly after the destruction of Nyamina in a civil war in 1794.

The Scottish explorer, Mungo Park visited the town in July 1796 and again in September 1805 when he stayed for over six weeks on his last, fatal journey. At the time, Sansanding was an important commercial center with a daily market and a larger weekly market. In the account of his first visit to the town in 1796 Park gives the population as between eight and ten thousand inhabitants. During his second voyage, he left this description:

Sansanding contains, according to Koontie Mamadie's account, eleven thousand inhabitants. It has no public buildings, except the mosques, two of which though built of mud, are by no means inelegant. The market-place is a large square, and the different articles of merchandize are exposed for sale on stalls covered with mats, to shade them from the sun. The market is crowded with people from morning to night: some of the stalls contain nothing but beads; others indigo in balls; others wood ashes in balls; others Houssa and Jinnie cloth. I observed one stall with nothing but antimony in small bits; another with sulphur, and a third with copper and silver rings and bracelets. In the houses fronting the square is sold, scarlet, amber, silks from Morocco, and tobacco, which looks like Levant tobacco, and comes by way of Tombuctoo. Adjoining this is the salt market, part of which occupies one corner of the square. A slab of salt is sold commonly for eight thousand cowries; a large butcher's stall, or shade, is in the centre of the square, and as good and fat meat sold every day as any in England. The beer market is at a little distance, under two large trees; and there are often exposed for sale from eighty to one hundred calabashes of beer, each containing about two gallons. Near the beer market is the place where red and yellow leather is sold.

Besides these market-places, there is a very large space which is appropriated for the great market every Tuesday. On this day astonishing crowds of people come from the country to purchase articles in wholesale, and retail them in the different villages, &c..

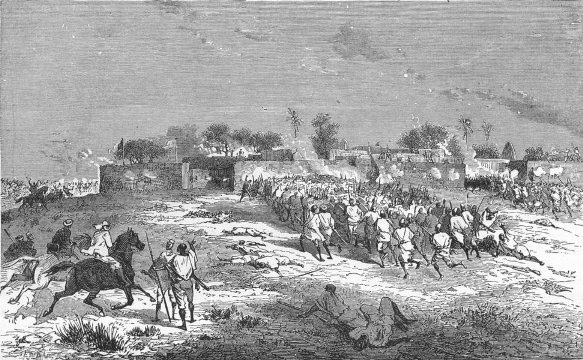
Ahmadu Tall, faama of Segou attacking Sansanding.

In the 1820s, border clashes between the Massina Empire and the Bamana of Segou cut the city of Djenne off from some of its southern trade routes, further cementing Sansanding's status as the preeminent trade town of the region. Umar Tall's conquest of the region and the ensuing instability damaged its prosperity however, and re-oriented trade routes away from the Niger towards an east-west axis.

Nevertheless, Sansanding managed to defend its independence against Umar Tall and his successor Ahmadu Tall. An attack in December 1863 succeeded in breaching the city walls, but the Toucouleur Empire troops stopped to pillage the town, giving time for the defenders to organize a successful counterattack. A siege from July to September of 1865 also failed.

Mademba Sy was Faama of Sansanding in the late 19th century. The French Colonial administration installed him as 'chief' of Massina after its conquest in the 1890s.

The population of the town at the time of the 1998 census was 6,508.
