= Ahmad al-Bakkai al-Kunti =

Ahmad al-Bakkai al-Kunti (1803 in the Azawad region north of Timbuktu – 1865 in Timbuktu) was a West African Islamic and political leader. He was one of the last principal spokesmen in precolonial Western Sudan for an accommodationist stance towards the threatening Christian European presence, and even provided protection to Heinrich Barth from an attempted kidnapping by the ruler of Massina, Amadu III. In a letter to the ruler, which was rather a fatwa he denied the former's right to have Barth arrested or killed and his belongings confiscated, as the Christian was neither a dhimmi (a non-Muslim subject of a Muslim ruler) nor an enemy of Islam, but the native of a friendly country, that is Great Britain. He went as far as to deny Ahmad Ahmad ibn Muhammad Lobbo the right to proclaim a jihad and called him "the ruler over a few huts at the outskirts of the Islamic world".

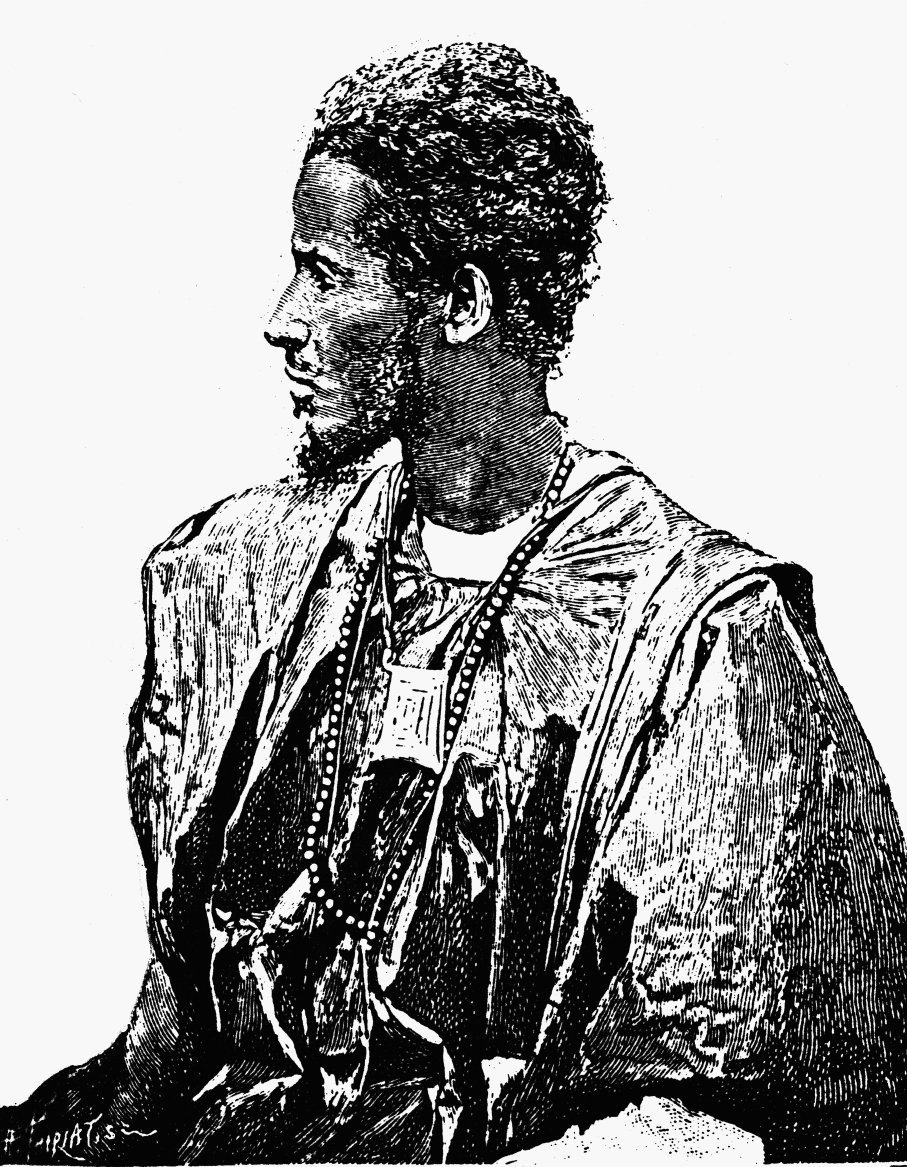
Moorish marabut of the Kunta tribe, Timbuktu region, late 19th century

Al-Bakkai was also one of the last Kunta family shaykhs, whose prestige and religious influence were interwoven with the Qadiri brotherhood and the economic fortunes of the Timbuktu region. His voluminous correspondence provides a rare, detailed glimpse into political and religious thought in 19th century West Africa regarding three primary concerns: the nature of the Imamate/caliphate in Sahelian and Sudanic communities, issues surrounding the encroaching Christian powers, and the growing politicalization of Sufi tariqah affiliation.
