= Tukulor Empire =

Sunni empire in West Africa (1852–1903)

Toucouleur Empire الخلافة التجانية Al-khilafat al-tijania
- 1852–1903
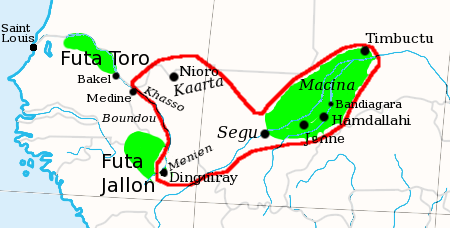
- The greatest extent of the Toucouleur Empire at the time of Omar Tall's death in 1864.
- Capital: Segou
- Common languages: Arabic (official); Fula
- Religion: Sunni Islam
- Government: Monarchy
- Caliph
  - 1852-1864: Omar Saidou Tall
  - 1864-1893: Ahmadu Tall
- Historical era: Early Colonial
  - Omar Tall declares jihad against Tamba: September 1852
  - Formally annexed into French West Africa: February 1903
Preceded by
Segu Empire
Kaarta
Massina Empire
Khasso
Kingdom of Diarra
Succeeded by
French West Africa
- Today part of: Mali; Senegal; Guinea; Mauritania

The Tukulor Empire (Note: Also known as the Tijaniyya Jihad state, the Segu Tukulor, the Tidjaniya Caliphate, the Umarian State, or the Umarian Empire.) (Arabic: الخلافة التجانية; Fula: Laamateeri Tijaani; French: Empire toucouleur) was an Islamic state in the mid-19th century founded by Omar Saidou Tall of the Toucouleur people of Senegal.

== History ==
=== Background and founding ===
Omar Tall returned from the Hajj in 1836 with the titles of El Hadj and caliph of the Tijaniyya brotherhood of the Sudan. After a long stay in Sokoto, he moved to the Fouta Djallon region (in present-day Guinea) in the 1840s. Here, he completed a major work on Tijaniyya scholarship; after this he started to focus on military struggle. Omar Tall planned to conquer new pagan territory for Islam.

Omar Tall's message appealed to a large cross-section of the Sahelian population in the mid 19th century, including Fula, Soninke, Moors, and others. Many lowerclass people had grievances against local religious or military elites. Slaves aspired to gain freedom fighting for Islam. Rootless individuals of mixed ethnic background found new social identity and opportunities. Communities under the power of Europeans looked to Tall to drive off the foreigners. Marabout families hoped to gain political power in addition to their religious influence.

His growing power and number of followers caused tension with the leaders of the Imamate. In 1851 he moved his community to found the city of Dinguiraye in what was then the Kingdom of Tamba. The king, Yambi, granted him the land in return for a yearly payment. Soon, however, Tall's continued stockpiling of weapons began to worry the Tamba leaders as well. After a series of emissaries to Tall were rebuffed, and one prominent griot even converted to Islam, Yambi pre-emptively attacked the community but was defeated in September 1852.

=== First conquests and conflict with the French ===
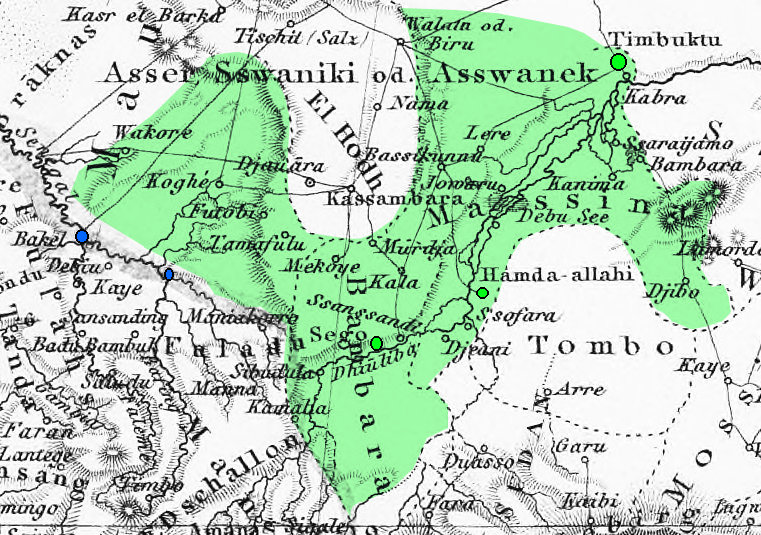
A contemporary German map showing states prior to the rise of Omar Tall, coloured to represent his empire in 1861. Conquered capitals in green, French forts in blue. The unoccupied region in the center is the waste of Hodh.

After conquering Tamba, Tall launched his jihad. His first moves were to the north, with the Jallonke general Modi Mamadu Jam leading the conquests of Makhana and Guidimakha. Tall built a tata near the city of Kayes that is today a popular tourist destination. He conquered Bambouk, then seized Nioro du Sahel, the capital of Kaarta, in April 1855, which became his capital. In 1855 and 56, his newly conquered Bambara subjects rebelled against the imposition of Islam.

After restoring control, Omar Tall turned west towards Futa Toro, Gajaaga and Bundu. This brought him into conflict with the French who were attempting to establish their commercial supremacy along the Senegal River. Tall besieged the French colonial army at Medina Fort. The siege failed on July 18, 1857, when Louis Faidherbe, French governor of Senegal, arrived with relief forces. In 1860 Omar Tall made a treaty with the French that recognized his, and his followers', sphere of influence in Futa Toro and assigned them the Bambara states of Kaarta and Segu.

=== Segou and Massina ===
With his western flank secure, Tall turned towards the Bamana Empire. He formally enthroned his son Ahmadu Tall as his successor and Amir al-Mu'minin during the campaign. The Toucouleur forces captured Nyamina without a fight on May 25, 1860, then won the battle of Witala in September, during which the cannon captured from the French were decisive. Amadu III of Masina lent aid to Bina 'Alī, the faama of Segou, on condition that he accept Islam. In January 1861 the Massina army was mobilized under the leadership of Ba Lobbo with 8,000 cavalry, 5,000 infantry and 1,000 musketeers and was joined at Tio, on the right bank of the Niger opposite Sansanding, by what was left of the Bamana forces. In mid-February two fleets of canoes clashed in mid-stream. About 500 of Umar's troops attacked a village near Tio on their own initiative, and were caught and destroyed. The next day, however, Umar split his army into two wings, which crossed the river at night and crushed the allied forces.

After a decisive victory in the Battle of Segou on March 10, 1861, Tall made the city the capital of his Toucouleur Empire. Another Bambara revolt broke out, instigated by Massina. Installing Ahmadu as faama of Segou, Tall marched down the Niger to put an end to the threat of Hamdullahi once and for all. This was controversial, as attacking a fellow Muslim power was forbidden. More than 70,000 died in the battles that followed. The most decisive was at Cayawal, where Amadu III was wounded, then captured and beheaded. Djenné fell quickly followed by Hamdullahi in May 1862.

Despite this victory, the region remained deeply unsettled. Tonjon warlords commanding remnants of the Bamana armies resisted in pockets, and raiding was endemic on all sides. Soon, a major rebellion broke out in the Massina lands led by Ba Lobbo. While suppressing the revolt in the spring of 1863, Omar Tall reoccupied the city of Hamdullahi, but in June the rebel forces besieged his army there. They captured the city in February 1864. Omar Tall fled, but was killed soon after.

=== Ahmadu Tall and decline ===
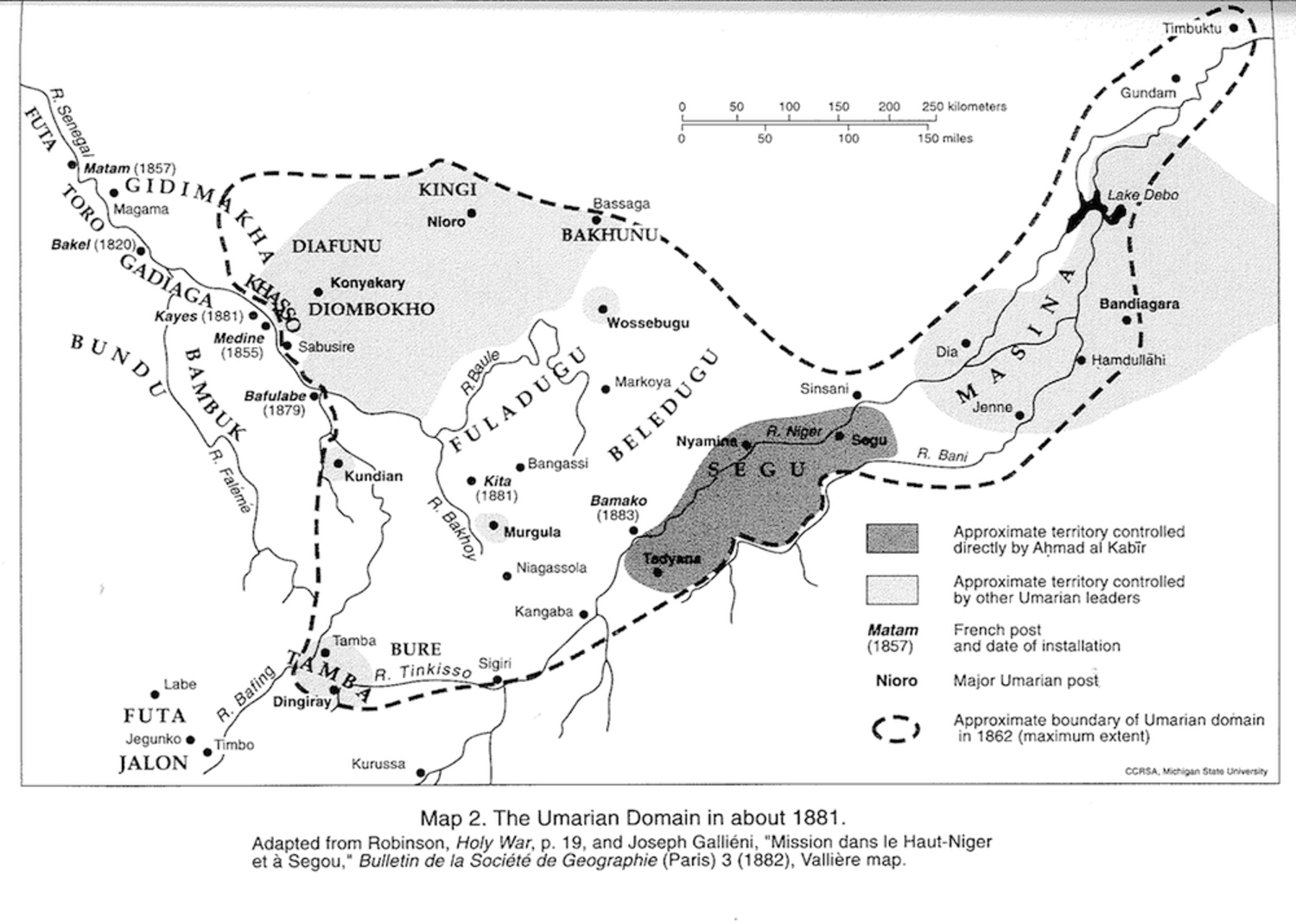
The Toucouleur Caliphate in 1881 under the reign of Ahmadu Tall.

At his death, Omar Tall's nephew Tidiani Tall contested the succession with Ahmadu Tall, continuing the war in Massina and installing his capital at Bandiagara. At Segou, Ahmadu continued to reign, fighting to centralize the empire against the resistance of the Fula aristocracy. To that end he cultivated a base of support among the Bambara natives of Segou. Still, Torodbe from Futa Toro dominated the upper ranks of the empire.

Ahmadu's brothers Aguibou and Mokhtar, who had been left in Dinguiraye during the wars against Segou and Massina, attempted to take power themselves in Nioro and Koniakary during the 1870s, but were both defeated and imprisoned. Ahmadu replaced them with another brother, Muntaga. He in turn rebelled in 1884, pushing Ahmadu to move his court to Nioro.

The French, meanwhile, continued to expand. They captured Nioro in 1891 and drove Ahmadu to Bandiagara. In 1893 the French took final control, ending the empire and sending Ahmadu into exile in Sokoto.

== Government and economy ==
One of the main aims of governance under the Toucouleur Empire was to unify the population of the state under the banner of Islam. To that end, justice and islamization were handled by a corps of qadis and marabouts. The state was funded by direct religious and secular taxes, as well as customs duties on trade.

Omar Tall's conquest of the Bamana Empire was facilitated by internal instability and decentralization, but this made rule of the middle Niger difficult. In the 1860s inflation was rampant, and troops raided widely to obtain supplies, since the state did not have a firm enough grip on the country to tax the people and pay or feed soldiers. Insecurity and the arms trade with the coast helped shift trade away from the north-south Niger routes towards an east–west axis linking Nioro to Segou.

At least by the reign of Ahmadu, the government of the Empire was highly structured, with governors of the various provinces seconded by cadis, military commanders and tax collectors, all appointed by the Khalifate. Ministers based in Segou managed various portfolios such as justice, the Niger River fleet, the public treasury, relations with Europeans and other foreign powers, commerce, etc. The army was professionalized and hierarchichal, with a core of sofas bodyguards, and commanded most of the state's budget.

== Legacy ==
A large swath of the Sahel territory that once encompassed the Toucouleur Empire is now today Muslim due to the campaigns of Omar Tall.

== See also ==
- Imamate of Futa Toro
- List of Sunni Muslim dynasties

== Sources ==
- Cissoko, Sekene Mody (1982). "Formations sociales et État en Afrique précoloniale : Approche historique". Présence Africaine. COLLOQUE SUR « LA PROBLÉMATIQUE DE L'ÉTAT EN AFRIQUE NOIRE ».
- Merriam-Webster (1999-09-01). Merriam-Webster's Encyclopedia of World Religions. Merriam-Webster. p. 1116. ISBN 978-0-87779-044-0.
- Roberts, Richard L. (1987). Warriors, Merchants, and Slaves: The State and the Economy in the Middle Niger Valley, 1700–1914. Stanford University Press. p. 82. ISBN 978-0-8047-6613-5.
