= Gossi =

- Commune and small town
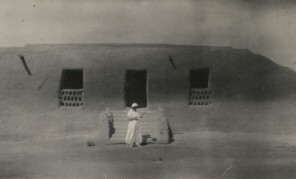

- Location in Mali
- Coordinates: 15°49′36″N 1°18′41″W
- Country: Mali
- Region: Tombouctou Region
- Cercle: Gourma-Rharous Cercle

Area
  - Total: 15,000 km^{2} (5,800 sq mi)
- Elevation: 279 m (915 ft)

Population (2009 census)
  - Total: 24,521
  - Density: 1.6/km^{2} (4.2/sq mi)
- Time zone: UTC+0 (GMT)

Gossi is a town and rural commune in the Cercle of Gourma-Rharous of the Tombouctou Region of Mali, lying northeast of Hombori and southwest of Gao. The town is just to the west of the main RN15 highway that links Mopti with Gao. It is on a seasonal lake, Mare de Gossi, and is surrounded by nature reserves in which a large herd of elephants live.

The town is the site of a large cattle market. The commune contains around 31 villages and in the 2009 census, it had a population of 24,521. Around 90% of the population are nomadic pastoralists but there are permanent settlements around Lake Gossi, Lake Ebanguemalène and Lake Agoufou.

The French Military ceded its control of a base in Gossi to the Malian Army in April 2022.

== Incidents ==
In May of 2013, the bodies of two Tuareg men were found just outside of Gossi. Just hours earlier they were stripped naked and trampled on by soldiers, only to be released at the request of a soldier who was a relative. The Minister of Defence attributed the killings to the Ganda Koy- a militia that works with the support of local authorities.

On 24 July 2014, a McDonnell Douglas MD-83 aircraft flying Air Algérie Flight 5017 crashed southeast of Gossi with 116 people on board. The flight had left Ouagadougou and was headed to Algiers. Initial reports suggested a sandstorm might have been to blame. Gossi was also the site of the capture of Mimi Ould Baba Ould El Mokhtar, believed to be responsible for a terrorist attack in Grand-Bassam, by French military forces.

In March 2022, the French military released video evidence of Russian mercenaries burying about a dozen bodies of Malians near the Gossi military base.
