= Omar Saidou Tall =

West African scholar and military leader

Oumar Foutiyou Tall
- El Hadji, Khalifa, Amir al-Mu'minin
- Reign: 1852–1864
- Successor: Ahmadu Tall
- Born: Oumar Tall c. 1796; Futa Tooro, Senegal
- Died: 14 February 1864 (aged 67–68); Bandiagara Escarpment
- Issue: Ahmadu Tall; Aguibou Tall; Muniru; Muntaga; Bassirou; Nourou; Daye
- Religion: Tijaniyyah Islam

Hadji Oumarûl Foutiyou Tall (ʿUmar ibn Saʿīd al-Fūtī Ṭaʿl, Arabic: حاج عمر بن سعيد الفوتي طعل, c. 1794 – 1864 CE), born in Futa Tooro, present-day Senegal, was a Senegalese Tijani sufi Toucouleur Islamic scholar and military commander who founded the short-lived Tukulor Empire, which encompassed much of what is now Senegal, Mauritania, Guinea and Mali.

== Name ==
Omar Tall’s name is spelt variously: in particular, his first name is commonly transliterated in French as Omar, although some sources prefer Umar; the patronymic, ibn Saʿīd, is often omitted; and the final element of his name, Tall (Arabic: طعل), is spelt variously as Tall, Taal or Tal.

The honorific El Hadj (also al-Hajj or el-Hadj), reserved for a Muslim who has successfully made the Hajj to Mecca, precedes Omar Tall's name in many texts, especially those in Arabic. Later he also took on the honorifics Amir al-Mu'minin, Khalifa, Qutb (pole of the universe), vizier of the Mahdi, Khalifat Khatim al-Awliya (successor of the seal of saints), and Almami (Imam).

== Early life ==
Omar Tall was born about 1794 in Halwar in the Imamate of Futa Toro (present-day Senegal), the tenth of twelve children. His father was Saidou Tall, from the Torodbe lineage, and his mother was Sokhna Adama Aissatou Thiam.

Omar Tall attended a madrassa before embarking on the Hajj in 1828, during which he learned from the scholars of Al Azhar University. While in Mecca he stayed with Muhammad al Ghali, the head of the Tijaniyyah order, who made him a muqaddam (commander) of the order with a commission to destroy paganism in the Sudan. He returned in 1830 as a marabout with the title El Hadj and assumed the khalifa of the Tijaniyya Sufi order in the Sudan. El-Hadj took the Tijani honorific Khalifat Khatim al-Awliya. This authority would become the basis of the authority necessary to lead Africans.

When returning from the Hajj, he camped near Damascus, where he met Ibrahim Pasha, Omar Tall befriended the Pasha and healed his son from a deadly fever. The trends set by the Pasha highly inspired Omar Tall.

== Gathering strength ==
Settling in Sokoto from 1831 to 1837, he entered into a polygynous marriage, with one of his wives being the daughter of the Fula caliph of the Sokoto Caliphate, Muhammed Bello. In 1837, Omar Tall moved to the Imamate of Futa Jallon and founded his religious settlement at Jegunko in 1840. Omar Tall claimed a transcendental personal authority. He denied the importance of adherence to a madhhab and favoured ijtihad or personal religious judgment. He taught that a believer should follow the guidance of a Sufi shaykh who has immediate personal knowledge of the divine truth. Even though Omar Tall never took the title of either mujaddid or Mahdi, he was regarded as such by his followers. He became the Torodbe ideal of religious revival and conquest of pagans.

Omar Tall's message appealed to a large cross-section of the Sahelian population in the mid-19th century, including Fula, Soninke, Moors, and others. Many lower-class people had grievances against local religious or military elites. Slaves aspired to gain freedom fighting for Islam. Rootless individuals of mixed ethnic backgrounds found new social identities and opportunities. Communities under the power of Europeans looked to Tall to drive off the foreigners. Marabout families hoped to gain political power in addition to their religious influence.

His growing power and number of followers caused tension with the leaders of the Imamate. In 1851 he moved his community to found the city of Dinguiraye in what was then the Kingdom of Tamba. The king, Yambi, granted him the land in return for a yearly payment. Soon, however, Tall's continued stockpiling of weapons began to worry the Tamba leaders as well. After a series of emissaries to Tall were rebuffed, and one prominent griot even converted to Islam, Yambi pre-emptively attacked the community but was defeated in September 1852.

== Initial conquests ==
With his victory in Tamba, Tall proclaimed a jihad against pagans, lapsed Muslims, European intruders, and the backsliding rulers of Futa Toro and Futa Jallon. As his army scored victories, he reinforced his army with the recruits who flocked to Dinguiraye and English guns purchased in Sierra Leone with the spoils of war.

Between May and November 1854, Tall launched a lightning conquest of Bambuk. The kings of the Khasso region peacefully submitted, and he built a tata in Kouniakary, whose commander acted as regional governor. The Khassonke soon came to chafe under Toucouleur rule, however, and the resulting conflict and rebellion, combined with a brutal famine, devastated the region. Tall seized Nioro du Sahel, the capital of Kaarta, in April 1855, which became his capital.

Next, Omar Tall turned west towards Futa Toro, Gajaaga and Bundu. This brought him into conflict with the French who were attempting to establish their commercial supremacy along the Senegal River. Tall besieged the French colonial army at Medina Fort. The siege failed on July 18 1857 when Louis Faidherbe, French governor of Senegal, arrived with relief forces. In 1860 Omar Tall made a treaty with the French that recognized his, and his followers', sphere of influence in Futa Toro and assigned them the Bambara states of Kaarta and Segu.

== Bambara and Masina ==
Prevented from expanding in the west by the French, Omar Tall turned East. He conquered the important Bambara cities of Nyamina and Sansanding, followed by Ségou on 10 March 1860. When Segu fell, their king, Ali Diara (Bina Ali), fled to Hamdullahi taking with him the traditional idols of the royal family.

While Omar Tall's wars thus far had been against the animist Bambara or the Christian French, he now turned his attention to the smaller Islamic states of the region. Installing his son Ahmadu Tall as imam of Segu, Omar Tall marched down the Niger to attack the Massina Empire of Hamdullahi. This was controversial, as attacking a fellow Muslim power was forbidden. Ahmad al-Bakkai al-Kunti, of the Qadari Sufi order, led a coalition of local states to resist this invasion, denounced as an illegitimate war of Muslims on Muslims. The coalition included inter alia, Masina and Timbuktu.

More than 70,000 died in the battles that followed. The most decisive was at Cayawal, after which Amadu III, the Masina king, was captured and executed. Djenné fell quickly followed by the final fall of Hamdullahi in May 1862.

Now controlling the entire Middle Niger, Omar Tall moved against Timbuktu, only to be repulsed in 1863 by a combined force of Tuaregs, Moors, and Fulas. In 1863, the coalition inflicted several defeats on Omar Tall's army, ending up killing Tall's generals Alpha Umar (Alfa 'Umar), Thierno Bayla and Alfa 'Uthman.

== Rebellion and death ==
Meanwhile, a rebellion broke out in the Masina lands led by Ba Lobbo, cousin of executed Masina monarch Amadu III. In suppressing the revolt during the spring of 1863, Omar Tall reoccupied the city of Hamdullahi, and in June Ba Lobbos's combined force of Fulas and Kountas besieged Omar Tall's army there. They captured Hamdallahi in February 1864. Omar Tall fled and managed to make it to a cave in Degembere (in the Bandiagara Escarpment) where he died on 14 February 1864.

Omar Tall's nephew Tidiani Tall succeeded him in retaking Massina, though his son Ahmadu Tall, operating out of Ségou, did much of the work in keeping the empire intact. Nonetheless, the French continued to advance, conquering Nioro in 1891. Omar Tall's jihad state was completely absorbed into the growing French West African empire.

== Legacy ==
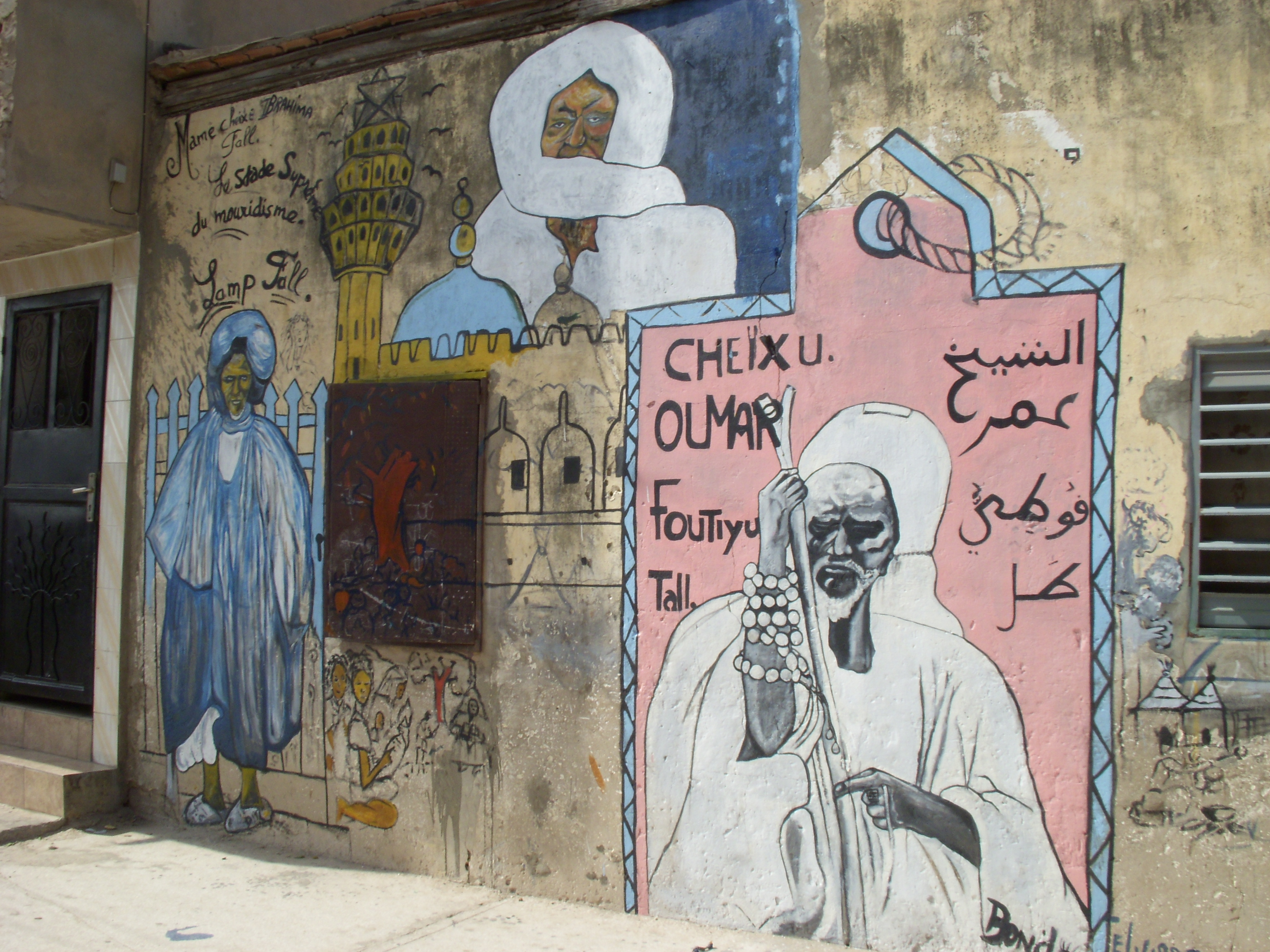
Graffiti of Omar Tall in Dakar, Senegal

Omar Tall remains a prominent figure in Senegal, Guinea, and Mali, though his legacy varies by country. While many Senegalese tend to remember him as a hero of anti-French resistance, Malian sources tend to describe him as an invader who prepared the way for the French by weakening West Africa. Omar Tall also figures prominently in Maryse Condé's 1984 historical novel Segu.

He remains to this day an influential figure in the Tijaniyya and other reformist movements, which stressed the importance of Muslim orthopraxy. Omar Tall's state forbade dancing, the use of tobacco, alcohol, charms, pagan ceremonies, and the worship of idols. Many un-Islamic practices were banned. These laws were also very strictly enforced, especially the ban on alcohol. Omar Tall abolished uncanonical taxes and replaced them with zakat, land taxes, and jizya. Polygamists were restricted to only four wives. Omar Tall, however, was uninterested in the logistical aspects of inculcating Islam such as building courts, madrassahs, and mosques. The primary function of Omar Tall's state was predatory warfare, slaving, the accumulation of booty, and the reform of morals. In Senegambia, his emphasis during the “jihadic period” is remembered as "not resistance to the Europeans but the “destruction of paganism” in the Western Sudan."

In November 2019, the French government returned the so-called sword of Omar Tall—which was the sword of Ahmadu Tall, Omar Tall's son—to the government of the Republic of Senegal. The sword was returned five years later. French MPs will vote later on permanently returning the sword.

== Lineage of kingship ==
Preceded by none	Leader of the Toucouleur Empire; 1850–1864	Succeeded by Ahmadu Tall
Preceded by Bamana Empire	Faama of Ségou; 1861–1864	Succeeded by Ahmadu Tall
