= Maasina Fulfulde =

Variety of the Fula language

- Fulfulde ڢُلْڢُلْدٜ; Maasina Fulfulde مَاسِنَ ڢُلْڢُلْدٜ; Maasinankoore مَاسِنَنْكࣷورٜ
- Native to: Mali
- Region: Macina
- Ethnicity: Fula
- Native speakers: 4.6 million (2014)
- Language family: Niger–Congo?: Atlantic–Congo; Senegambian; Fula–Wolof; Fula; West Central; Maasina Fulfulde
- Dialects: Eastern Macina; Western Macina
- Writing system: Arabic (Ajami); Latin

Language codes
- ISO 639-3: ffm
- Glottolog: maas1239

Maasina Fulfulde is a variety of the Fula language. It is spoken mainly in Mali, Ivory Coast, and Ghana by 4.6 million people. The language has several mutually intelligible dialects albeit with some differences. The variety is named after the Macina region in Mali.

Maasinankoore is the most widely spoken dialect of Fula spoken in Mali and is a national language of the country.

According to Ethnologue there are two dialects - Western and Eastern - and "There are some dialect differences, but popular opinion is that all dialects in Mali are inherently intelligible."

Maasina Fulfulde is grammatically basically the same as other varieties of Fula, with some particularities. For instance there are some slight differences in some verb endings.

The counting system retains a recapitulation of older systems historically used by other groups in what is now Mali. Tens from 60-90 have alternative versions not used in other varieties of Fula. In the table the general form, which would be understood by any Fulaphone person (basically counting by tens) and Maasina variant.

A progressive verbal expression is formed by inserting the word ni before the verb in the non-accomplished voice. For example, omo ni wara 'she/he is coming (right now)'.

== Orthography ==
Maasina Fulfulde is mostly written in a modified Latin alphabet but in limited instances and historically more commonly also written in the Arabic script.

There have been attempts to standardize both the Latin and the Arabic script for Maasina Fulfulde. The Latin alphabet, consisting of 32 letters, was standardized by Government Decree No. 1 85/PG/RM on 26 May 1967.

Fulfulde Arabic Alphabet in Mali, comes from centuries of usage, literature, and tradition. Arabic script has been the common in the region since the conversion of local populations to Islam in the 12th century. However, its modern form was standardized in a UNESCO.BREDA conference in 1987 in Bamako, whose results were published in a report.

Table below illustrates the Latin alphabet for Maasina Fulfulde. While Maasina Fulfulde has 5 vowel letters, long vowels are shown by writing the corresponding vowel letter twice. Digraphs are included as separate letters in Fulfulde Latin Alphabet, and there 4 of them, "Mb", "Nd", "Ng", "Nj". There also exist 6 additional letters in Fulfulde Latin Alphabet, including "apostrophe" representing a glottal stop, and 3 plosive letters.

Maasina Fulfulde Latin alphabet
’	A a	B b	Ɓ ɓ	C c	D d	Ɗ ɗ	E e	F f	G g	H h	I i	J j	K k	L l	M m
[ʔ]	[a]	[b]	[ɓ]	[t͡ʃ]	[d]	[ɗ]	[e]	[f]	[g]	[h]	[i]	[d͡ʒ]	[k]	[l]	[m]
Mb mb	N n	Nd nd	Ng ng	Nj nj	Ɲ ɲ	Ŋ ŋ	O o	P p	R r	S s	T t	U u	W w	Y y	Ƴ ƴ
[ᵐb]	[n]	[ⁿd]	[ᵑɡ]	[ᶮd͡ʒ]	[ɲ]	[ŋ]	[o]	[p]	[r]	[s]	[t]	[u]	[w]	[j]	[ʄ]

Maasina Fulfulde Arabic alphabet (Mali)
Arabic (Latin) [IPA]	ا ‌( - / ’ ) [∅]/[ʔ]	ب (B b) [b]	ٽ (Mb mb) [ᵐb]	ت (T t) [t]	ٺ (C c) [t͡ʃ]	ث (S s) [s]
Arabic (Latin) [IPA]	ج (J j) [d͡ʒ]	ڃ (Nj nj) [ᶮd͡ʒ]	ح (H h) [h]	خ (Kh kh) [x]	ݗ (Ŋ ŋ) [ŋ]	د (D d) [d]
Arabic (Latin) [IPA]	ڌ (Nd nd) [ⁿd]	ذ (Z z) [d͡ʒ]	ر (R r) [r]	ز (Z z) [d͡ʒ]	س (S s) [s]	ش (Š š) [ʃ]
Arabic (Latin) [IPA]	ص (S s) [s]	ض (D d) [d]	ط (Ɗ ɗ) [ɗ]	ظ (Z z) [d͡ʒ]	ع ( ’ ) [ʔ]	غ (G g) [ɡ]
Arabic (Latin) [IPA]	ݝ (G g) [ɡ]	ڠ (Ng ng) [ᵑɡ]	ڢ (F f) [f]	ݠ (P p) [p]	ڧ (K k) [k]	ك (K k) [k]
Arabic (Latin) [IPA]	ل (L l) [l]	م (M m) [m]	ݥ (Ɓ ɓ) [ɓ]	ن (N n) [n]	ه (H h) [h]	و (W w) [w]
Arabic (Latin) [IPA]	ؤ ( - ) [ʔ]	ي (Y y) [j]	ئ ( - ) [ʔ]	ࢩ (Ɲ ɲ) [ɲ]	ۑ (Ƴ ƴ) [ʄ]	

Vowel at the beginning of a word
A	E	I	O	U
Short Vowels
اَ	اٜ	اِ	اࣷ	اُ
Long Vowels
Aa	Ee	Ii	Oo	Uu
آ	اٜيـ / اٜي	اِيـ / اِي	اࣷو	اُو

Vowel at the middle or end of a word
a	e	i	o	u	∅
Short Vowels
◌َ	◌ٜ	◌ِ	◌ࣷ	◌ُ	◌ْ
Long Vowels
aa	ee	ii	oo	uu	
◌َا / ◌َـا	◌ٜيـ / ◌ٜـيـ ◌ٜي / ◌ٜـي	◌ِيـ / ◌ِـيـ ◌ِي / ◌ِـي	◌ࣷو / ◌ࣷـو	◌ُو / ◌ُـو	

== Sample Text ==
Passage from the Bible, Book of Romans, Chapter 1, verses 8, 9, and 10:

Translation	^{8}First, I thank my God through Jesus Christ for all of you, because your faith is proclaimed throughout the world. ^{9}For God, whom I serve with my spirit by announcing the gospel of his Son, is my witness that without ceasing I remember you always in my prayers, ^{10}asking that by God’s will I may somehow at last succeed in coming to you.
Latin Script	^{8}Ko adii fuu, miɗo yetta Laamɗo e innde Iisaa Almasiihu saabe mooɗon on fuu, sabi haala goonɗinal mon haalaama e aduna oo fuu. ^{9}Laamɗo mo ndewiran-mi ɓernde laaɓunde e ley ko njottinan-mi Kabaaru Lobbo haala Ɓiyiiko oo koo, o seede miɗo miccitoo on wakkati fuu ^{10}e ley duwaawuuji am fuu. Miɗo ɲaagoo Laamɗo newnana kam laawol e ley muuyɗe muuɗum no mi warda to mon.
Ajami Script	^{۸} كࣷ اَدِي ڢُو، مِطࣷ يٜتَّ لَامْطࣷ اٜ اِنْڌٜ عِيسَى اَلْمَسِيحُ سَابٜ مࣷوطࣷنْ اࣷنْ ڢُو، سَبِ حَالَ غࣷونْطِنَلْ مࣷنْ حَالَامَ اٜ اَدُنَ اࣷو ڢُو؞ ^{۹} لَامْطࣷ مࣷ ڌٜوِرَنْمِ ݥٜرْڌٜ لَاݥُڌٜ اٜ لٜيْ كࣷ ڃࣷتِّنَنْمِ كَبَارُ لࣷبّࣷ حَّالَ ݥِيِيكࣷ اࣷو كࣷو، اࣷ سٜيدٜ مِطࣷ مِٺِتࣷو اࣷنْ وَڧَتِ ڢُو ^{۱۰} اٜ لٜيْ دُوَاوُوجِ اَمْ ڢُو؞ مِطࣷ ۑَاغࣷو لَامْطࣷ نٜوْنَنَ كَمْ لَاوࣷلْ اٜ لٜيْ مُويْطٜ مُوطُمْ نࣷ مِ وَرْدَ تࣷ مࣷنْ؞
