= Kunta family =

The Kunta family (the Awlad Sidi al-Wafi) is among the best-known examples of a lineage of Islamic scholarship with widespread influence throughout Mauritania, Senegambia, and other parts of the Western Sudan, and are closely associated with the expansion of Qadiriyya.

The Kunta shaykhs and the family or clan they represent, are an outgrowth of the Kounta Bedouin Arab peoples who spread throughout what is today northern Mali (Azawad) and southern Mauritania from the mid-sixteenth to the early eighteenth centuries (CE).

== Family background ==
The family's history goes back to Sheikh Sidi Ahmed al-Bakka'i (Arabic: الشيخ سيدي أحمد البكاي بودمعة ; born in the region of the Noun River – d.1504 in Akka) who established a Qadiri zawiya (Sufi residence) in Walata. In the 16th century the family spread across the Sahara to Timbuktu, Agadez, Bornu, Hausaland, and other places, and in the 18th century large numbers of Kunta moved to the region of the middle Niger where they established the village of Mabruk. Sidi Al-Mukhtar al-Kunti (1728–1811) united the Kunta factions by successful negotiation, and established an extensive confederation. Under his influence the Maliki school of Islamic law was reinvigorated and the Qadiriyyah order spread throughout Mauritania, the middle Niger region, Guinea, the Ivory Coast, Futa Toro, and Futa Jallon. Kunta colonies in the Senegambian region became centers of Muslim teaching.

== Political Involvement ==
The Kunta family has historically played a leading role in Timbuktu, and have been power brokers in many states of the upper Niger.

== See also ==
- Ahmed al-Bakkai al-Kunti (d.1865) – West African Islamic and political leader and one of the last Kunta sheikhs.

== Notes ==
=== Other sources ===
- Elias N. Saad, Social History of Timbuktu: The Role of Muslim Scholars and Notables, 1400–1900. Cambridge: Cambridge University Press, (1983), 150, 214–15
