= Hamdullahi =

- Site of town
- حمد الله

Name transcription(s)
  - Arabic: حمد الله
  - French: Hamdallaye
  - Maasina Fulfulde: hamdallaay حَمْدَلَّايْ
  - Koyra Chiini: hamdallaay حَمْدَلَّايْ
- Location within modern Mali
- Coordinates: 14°19′52″N 4°05′45″W
- Country: Mali

Hamdullahi (Arabic: حمد الله; also Hamdallahi or Hamdallaye. From the Arabic: Praise to God) is a town in the Mopti Region of Mali.

In the 19th century, it was the capital of the Fula empire of Massina. Founded around 1820 by Seku Amadu. On March 16, 1862, the town fell to the Toucouleur conqueror El Hadj Umar Tall after three major battles that claimed over 70,000 lives. Umar Tall destroyed the city, marking the effective end of the Massina Empire.

The ruins of the abandoned town are located 21 km southeast of Mopti, at a site lying to the east of the Bani River and to the west of the Bandiagara plateau. The town was encircled by sun-dried mudbrick walls and covered an area of 244 hectares (604 acres). The town walls and some of the street layout are clearly visible on satellite images provided by Google. The mosque and Seku Amadu's palace were located side by side in the centre of the town. They were also constructed of sun-dried bricks, except for the enclosing walls of the palace, which were of stone. The mosque has been rebuilt and reopened in 2004.

== Demographics ==
=== 19th Century ===
Bintou Sanankoua discusses the population of Hamdullahi while under the Fula empire. She dismisses grand numbers that give a population in the multiple hundred thousands. Basing her estimate off the number of people who prayed at the mosque, she comes to a number of around 11,200. This population was majority Fula, with inhabitants hailing from all parts of the empire.
