= Caliphate of Hamdullahi =

Caliphate in West Africa

Caliphate of Hamdullahi خلافة حمد الله (Arabic)
- 1818–1862
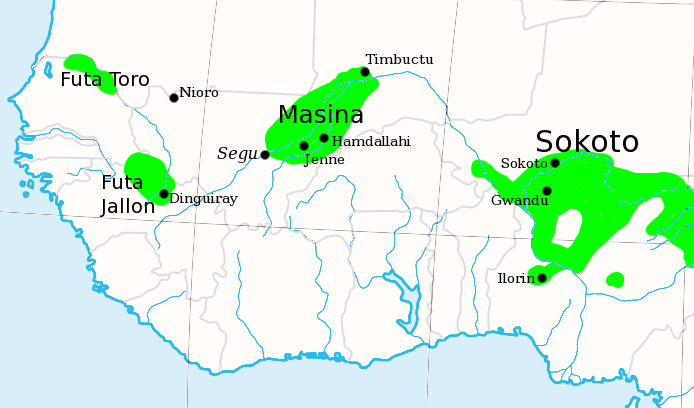
- The Fulani Jihad States of West Africa, c. 1830.
- Capital: Hamdullahi
- Common languages: Maasina Fulfulde(Official)
- Religion: Islam
- Government: Caliphate
- Almami
  - 1818 – 1845: Seku Amadu
  - 1845 – 1852: Amadu II
  - 1852 – 1862: Amadu III
- Legislature: Grand Council
- Historical era: Late modern period; Fula jihads
  - Founding of the Sultanate of Massina: c. 1400
  - Battle of Noukouma: 1818
  - Disestablished: 1862
Preceded by	Succeeded by
Sultanate of Massina; Segou Empire	Toucouleur Empire
- Today part of: Mali

The Caliphate of Hamdullahi (Arabic: خلافة حمد الله; Fula: Laamorde Maasina; Bambara: Massina Mansamara; French: Empire du Macina; also: Dina of Massina, Sise Jihad state), also known as the Massina Empire (also spelled Maasina or Macina), was an early nineteenth-century Sunni Muslim caliphate in West Africa centered in the Inner Niger Delta of what is now the Mopti and Ségou Regions of Mali. It was founded by Seku Amadu in 1818 during the Fulani jihads after defeating the Bambara Empire and its allies at the Battle of Noukouma. By 1853, the empire had fallen into decline and was ultimately destroyed by Omar Saidou Tall of Toucouleur.

The Massina Empire was one of the most organized theocratic states of its time on the African continent and had its capital at Hamdullahi. It was ruled by an almami with the help of a Grand Council that possessed the power to elect new rulers after the death of the previous one. While, in theory, the almami did not have to be a member of the Bari family, but only someone who was learned and pious, every almami elected happened to be a son of the previous ruler.

== History ==
The Sultanate of Massina was founded in c. 1400 by a group of Fulani originally coming from the Termess, south of Hodh. For centuries after their arrival, the inhabitants were vassals of larger states, including the Mali Empire (14th century), the Songhai Empire (15th-16th centuries), the Arma (Moroccan) pashas of Tomboctou (17th century), and the Bambara Empire at Ségou (18th century).

=== Seku Amadu and the Founding of the Caliphate ===
In the early 1800s, inspired by the recent Muslim uprisings of Usman dan Fodio in nearby Hausaland, preacher and social reformer Seku Amadu Lobbo began efforts at increasing religious revivals in his homeland, intending to restore genuine Islam rather than the contemporaneous infusion of Islam with traditional beliefs. Massina at this time was controlled by Muslim Fulani vassals of the Bambara Empire (whose government was animist). Amadu was born from a minor scholar family from one of the less important Fulani clans. He was both a religious and political outsider which increasingly led him to clash with the established elites as his influence in the region grew at their expense. He promised to free converted slaves and reverse market and cattle taxes for the merchants and Fula pastoralists respectfully. This tension would lead to open confrontation in 1818 when the death of Ardo Guidado, son of the chief Fulani Ardo Amadu, was blamed on one of Seku Amadu's students.

Ardo Amadu used this incident to mobilize an army of over 200,000 men from Segu, Poromani, Monimpé, Goundaka, and Massina intending to crush the jihadists. The initial encounter took place at the Battle of Noukouma, during which Seku Amadu's relatively small battalion of 1,000 men was able to route a force of 100,000, led by General Jamogo Séri. Seku Amadu interpreted his victory as a divine miracle and went on to lead a jihad against the Bambara Empire in 1818. The empire expanded rapidly, taking Djenné in 1818. The Fulani Sangare clan revolted and invited Ahmadu to rule. In 1820 Ahmadu established a new capital at Hamdullahi ("Praise God"). Despite Fulani chiefs pledging loyalty, Ahmadu suspected them of being motivated by self-interest rather than religious zeal, and he overthrew them one by one. In 1823 he defeated separate Fulani jihadists from Fittuga, and in 1826/7 conquered Timbuktu, as the caliphate came to rule the lands from there to Djenne.

=== Apogee ===
Ahmadu was largely successful at protecting the state's frontiers and maintaining internal peace. At the height of the empire's power, a 10,000-man army was stationed in the city, and Seku Amadu ordered the construction of six hundred madrasas to further the spread of Islam. Sharia law was widely applied and non-Muslim practices were banned, such as alcohol, tobacco, music, and dancing, with severe punishments. A social welfare system provided for widows and orphans, and many state-sponsored schools were founded. Fulani pastoralists received protection during annual migrations and were encouraged to settle. A strict interpretation of Islamic injunctions against ostentation led Amadu to order the Great Mosque of Djenné to be abandoned, and all future mosques were ordered built with low ceilings and without decoration or minarets. Hamdallahi's mosque was therefore unadorned. One of the most enduring accomplishments was a code regulating the use of the inland Niger delta region by Fula cattle herders and diverse farming communities.

Massina's expansion into the region between the Mali-Niger border and north-eastern Burkina Faso was more successful, and marked the southernmost limit of the empire, which it shared with the Sokoto empire. The various chiefdoms of the region, most notably Baraboullé and Djilgodji, were subsumed in the late 1820s after a serious of disastrous battles for the Massina army that ultimately ended when threats from the Yatenga kingdom forced the local chieftains to place themselves under Massina's protection. The conflict that emerged with the Bambara state of Kaarta, however, was more serious, with Massina's army suffering heavy casualties, especially in 1843–44. Every attempt by to expand westward proved equally futile.

After the first conquest of the north-eastern regions between Timbuktu and Gao, the Arma and Tuareg who inhabited the region rebelled several times, trying to escape the imposition of direct rule by Ahmadu's appointed governor Abd al-Qādir (who took over from Pasha Uthman al-Rimi). This prompted Massina to firmly control the town in 1833 when a Fulbe governor was appointed that controlled the entire region up to Gao. A Tuareg force drove off the Massina garrison in 1840 but were in the following year defeated and expelled. The Tuareg then regrouped in 1842-1844 and managed to defeat the Massina forces and drive them from Timbuktu, but the city was later besieged by Massina and its inhabitants were starved into resubmitting to Massina's rule by 1846. Disputes between Massina and Timbuktu were often mediated by the Kunta scholarly family led by Muhammad al-Kunti and his son al-Mukhtar al-Saghir. Ahmadu died in 1844, leaving control of the Massina Empire to his son, Ahmadu II. Ahmadu II was less capable than his father, and his reign saw Timbuktu rebel to gain self-rule. He died in 1852 and was succeeded by Ahmadu III.

=== Decline ===
The ascension of Amadu III to the throne in 1853, following his election by the Grand Council over arguably more capable uncles, marked the beginning of the decline of the empire. Amadu III's reign was defined by controversy. He was said to be less valiant in war and was more lax when it came to the adherence to the religious tenets that governed the empire. Ahmadu III replaced prominent religious leaders with younger, more liberal men. Omar Saidou Tall of the nascent Tukulor Empire had wished to ally Massina against the animist Segou empire, however Ahmadu III saw the conversion of the territory as Massina's responsibility, compounded by tensions between Omar's Tijaniyyah and Massina's Qadiriyya orders regarding which was best at spreading Islam. Massina's Fulani, the Kunta, and the Bambara fought against Omar's forces, however in 1861 Segou had been conquered. In 1862, Omar launched an attack on Massina, and was met with little resistance from Amadu III's unorganized army. After a series of bloody battles such as Cayawal, he entered Hamdullahi on 16 May, levelling it. Amadu III was captured and put to death. Though resistance briefly continued under Amadu III's brother Ba Lobbo, the destruction marked the effective end of the Massina Empire.

== Government ==
The Massina Empire contained one of the most sophisticated governments in Africa at the time, with a system of checks and balances and a well-established tax system. It was organized as an Islamic state with strong democratic tendencies that created great stability within the empire. There were also agents who would audit government officials.

=== Legislature ===
The Massina Empire was governed by a 40-member Grand Council appointed by the Almami for their wisdom and creativity and 60 judges who were prominent marabouts. Two scholars were selected to consider state business before presenting it to the council. The Grand Council acted as the legislative, executive, and judicial branches of the empire and could make their own decisions based on strict observance of the Maliki interpretation of Sharia law. However, it was only the Almami who could demand a revision of a policy or decision or act as a lawyer on behalf of a plaintiff. If the Grand Council and the Almami ever came to a disagreement 40 of the 60 judges were selected randomly to make the final decision.

The Grand Council also possessed the authority to designate the succeeding Almami. While, in theory, the almami did not have to be a member of the Bari family, but only someone who was learned and pious, every almami elected happened to be a son of the previous ruler.

=== Regions ===
The empire was made up of five major regions known as Jenneri, Fakala-Kunari, Hayre-Seno, Massina, and Nabbe-Dude. Within each of these regions, governance was entrusted to a military governor, known as the amiru, who bore the responsibility of safeguarding their respective territories. The amiru were supported by local councils and a state-funded judicial system, granting them the authority to render independent legal judgments and facilitate conflict resolution. The Grand Council would act as the supreme court.

=== Local government ===
The capital of Hamdullahi was divided into 18 neighborhoods further divided into several residences. Each of these residences were surrounded by a high wall to protect privacy and a well that ensured a reliable source of drinking water. There was also a strong police presence that enforced rules of conduct such as hygiene. Taxes were levied on harvest, military spending, and a general Muslim tithe in all of the villages and towns of the empire.

Education was prioritized by the empire and played an important part in every citizen's life. Both boys and girls from the ages of 7-21 would learn the basics of the Qur'an and the tradition of the Prophet, advanced theology and mysticism, and, in some cases, more secular subjects such as grammar and rhetoric. All school fees were fixed and teachers were subsidized by the central government.

== List of rulers ==
Names and dates taken from John Stewart's African States and Rulers (1989). For some alternative spellings and dates, see the Tarikh al-Sudan. Rulers from 1814 to 1873, except for Tukolor regents, used the title of 'Sheikh'.

#	Name	Reign Start	Reign End
1	Majam Dyallo	c. 1400	1404
2	Birahim I	1404	1424
3	Ali I	1424	1433
4	Kanta	1433	1466
5	Ali II	1466	1480
6	Nguia	1480	1510
7	Sawadi	1510	1539
8	Ilo	1539	1540
9	Amadi Sire	1540	1543
10	Hammadi I	1543	1544
11	Bubu I	1544	1551
12	Ibrahim	1551	1559
13	Bubu II	1559	1583
14	Hammadi II	1583	c. 1595
Moroccan rule (c. 1595 – 1599)
14	Hammadi II (Restored)	1599	1603
15	Bubu III	1603	1613
16	Birahim II	1613	1625
17	Silamaka	1625	1627
18	Hammadi III	1627	1663
19	Hammadi IV	1663	
20	Ali III	1663	1673
21	Gallo	1673	1675
22	Gurori I	1675	1696
23	Gueladio	1696	1706
24	Guidado	1706	1716
25	Hammadi V	1761	1780
26	Ya Gallo	1780	1801
27	Gurori II	1801	1810
28	unknown	1810	1814
29	Hamadu I	1814	1844
30	Hamadu II	1844	1852
31	Hamadu III	1852	1862
Tukolor military government (1862 – 1863)
32	Sidi al-Bakka (Tukolor regent)	1863	1864
33	Sheikh Abidin al-Bakha'i (Tukolor regent)	1864	
34	Badi Tali	1864	1871
35	Badi Sidi	1871	1872
36	Ahmadu	1872	1873
-	Sheikh Abidin al-Bakha'i (Tukolor regent) (Restored)	1873	1874

== See also ==
- Mademba Sy
