= Toucouleur people =

West African ethnic group

Haalpulaar هَالْݒُلَارْ
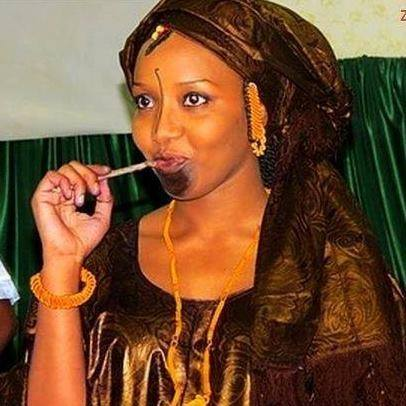
- Toucouleur woman from Senegal

Total population
- 1 million (2010)

Regions with significant populations
- Senegal; The Gambia; Mali; Mauritania

Languages
- Pulaar, French, Wolof and Arabic

Religion
- Islam

Related ethnic groups
- Serer, Wolof, Fula

The Toucouleur people or Tukulor people (Arabic: تكرور, French: Toucouleur), also called Haalpulaar (Ajami: هَالْݒُلَارْ), are a West African ethnic group native to the Futa Toro region of Senegal. There are smaller communities in Guinea, Gambia, Mali and Mauritania. The Toucouleur were Islamized in the 11th century; their early and strong Islamic heritage, which is seen as a defining feature, is a matter of great pride for them. They were among the first Muslims in the area that became Senegal. They were influential in the spread of Islam to West Africa in the medieval era.

They founded the vast Toucouleur Empire in the 19th century under Omar Saidou Tall who led a religious war against the neighboring ethnic groups and the French colonial forces.

The Toucouleur are traditionally sedentary, settled primarily in the Senegal River valley, with farming, fishing and raising cattle as their main activities. The Toucouleur society has been patrilineal, polygynous and with high social stratification that included slavery and a caste system. There are an estimated 1 million Toucouleur people in West Africa.

== Distribution ==
They are found primarily in the northern regions of Senegal, where they constitute 15% of the population. This region is irrigated by the Senegal River valley and overlaps southern Mauritania. During the colonial era and in modern times, some of the Toucouleurs resettled in western Mali. They are about a million Toucouleur people in Senegal River valley area, and about 100,000 in Mali.

== Identification and language ==
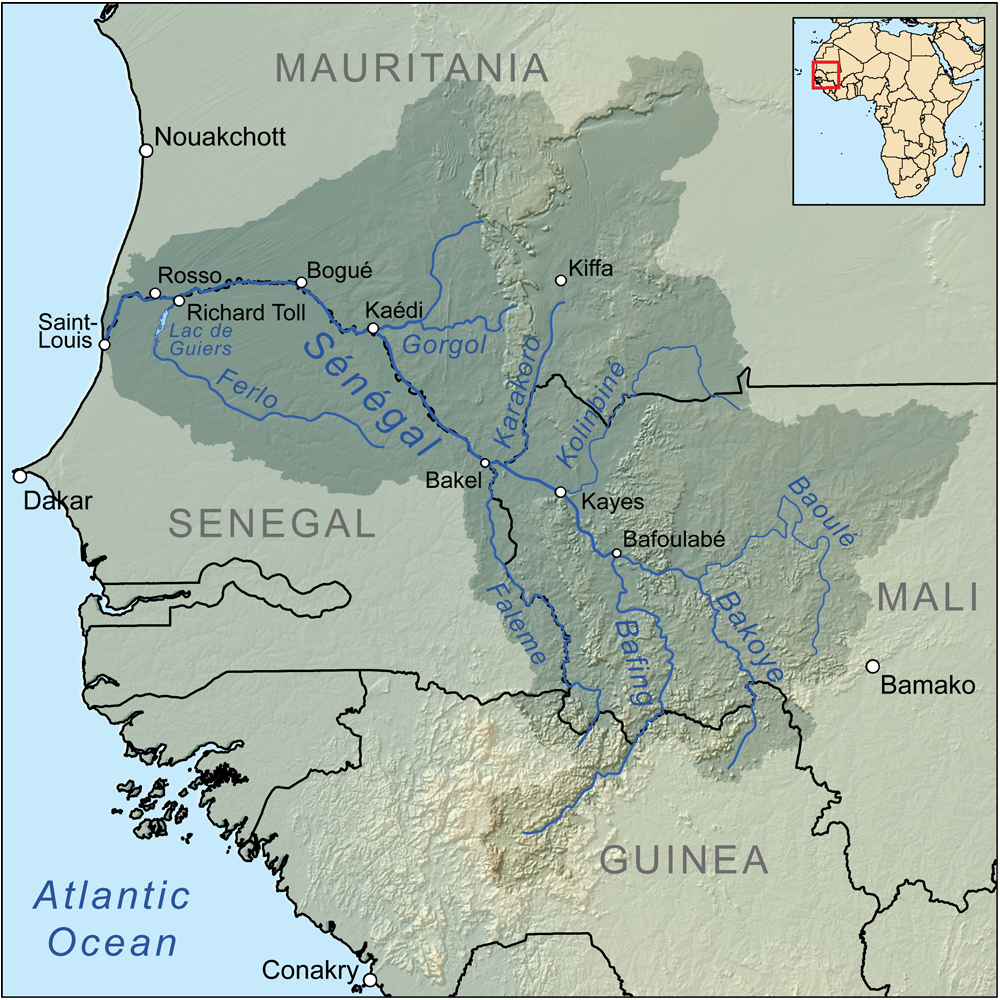
The Toucouleur trace their roots to the Senegal River valley at the border of Senegal and Mauritania

Besides Toucouleur, they are variously referred to as Pulaar: Torooɓe, Futanke, or Haalpulaar (French literature). The name Toucouleur is of unclear origin, with some sources stating it as a French derivation meaning "of every color", which itself may be a folk etymology. More likely it is a deformation of tekruri, a precolonial term meaning "people from Takrur".

The supposed distinction between Toucouleurs and Fula people more generally was invented by French ethnographers in the 19th century. They differentiated between supposedly sedentary, agricultural, fanatical, and anti-European Toucouleurs on one hand and nomadic, pastoralist, docile and cooperative Peulhs on the other, but the dichotomy is false.

Toucouleurs speak the Pulaar language, a dialect of Fula, an Atlantic branch of the Niger-Congo language family of languages.

== History ==
According to the oral traditions of the Toucouleur and Serer, the Toucouleurs are descendants of Serer and Fula ancestors. This tradition is supported by many scholars including Foltz and Phillips. A mutually acceptable bantering-style interaction, called the joking relationship by anthropologists, exists between the Serers and Toucouleurs.

The Toucouleur people have long inhabited the Senegal River area, with roots of an organized Tekrur kingdom tracing back to the 5th century. They were part of the 10th to the 18th century kingdom, but led by non-Toucouleur rulers from other ethnic groups. In the 18th century, a Toucouleur empire emerged which reached its peak influence in the 19th century under the Islamic leader Omar Saidou Tall. Omar was born in a Toucouleur clerical family in 1797. During his visit to Mecca in 1827, Omar was designated as the "Caliph of Black Africa." He returned to West Africa in 1833, and subsequently learned political and state building strategies from his father-in-law in the Sokoto Caliphate.

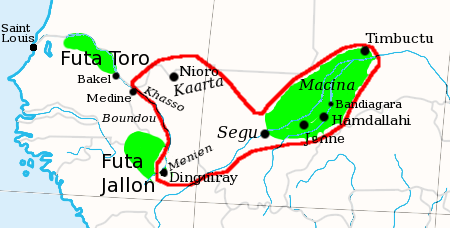
The Toucouleur Empire of Omar Saidou Tall expanded from Futa Toroo into new regions (red) in the 19th century.

Omar returned to Senegal in 1845, where he began preaching Islam among the Toucouleur. He obtained weapons from Europe, then mobilized the Toucouleur to pursue an Islamic holy war in 1854 against the non-Muslim ethnic groups and those Muslims who had strayed. The Toucouleur armies succeeded. The Toucouleur Empire grew and extended from Senegal to much of Mali over the next ten years. His son Mustafa reigned over this empire and the Toucouleur between 1864 and 1870, followed by Omar's second son, Ahmadu Tall. The rule of Ahmadu, state Gallieni and Joffre, was a "Toucouleur-Muslim despot" over the Mandinka people and Bambara people. The empire collapsed in the 1880s as the Fulani, Tuaregs and the Moors attacked the Toucouleurs, and a civil war between local Toucouleur leaders engulfed the region. The empire ended in 1891, after the French colonial forces invaded the region.

== People and society ==
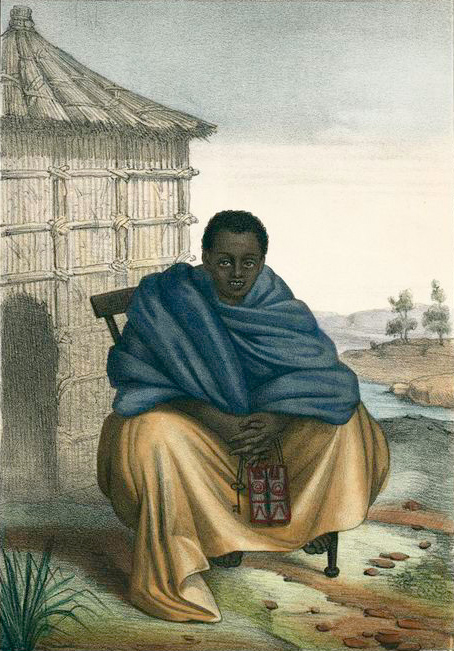
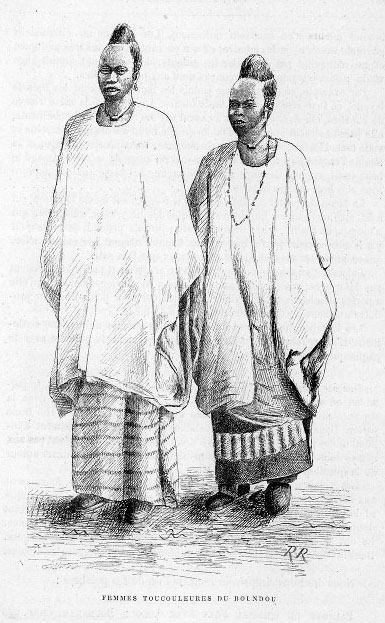
Toucouleur marabout (left) and women in traditional dresses (19th century).

The Toucouleurs speak the Futa Tooro dialect of Pulaar. They call themselves Haalpulaar’en, which means "those who speak Pulaar". They are Muslims. Culturally, the Toucouleur differ from other Fula people by the sedentary nature of their society.

=== Social stratification ===
Toucouleur society is patriarchal and divided into strict and rigid caste hierarchies.

The highest status among the five Toucouleur castes is of the aristocratic leaders and Islamic scholars called Torobe. Below them are the Rimbe, or the administrators, traders and farmers. The Nyenbe are the artisan castes of the Toucouleur society. The fourth caste strata is called the Gallunkobe or the slaves or descendants of slaves "who have been freed". The bottom strata among the Toucouleurs are the Matyube or slaves. The slaves were acquired by raiding pagan ethnic groups or purchased in slave markets, or the status was inherited.

The hierarchical social stratification has been an economically closed system, which historically has meant a marked inequality. Property and land has been exclusively owned by the upper caste members. Occupations and caste memberships are inherited. The Toucouleur castes have been endogamous, segregated and intermarriage has been rare. The clerics among Toucouleur like the Wolof people formed a separate group. The religious leaders were not necessarily endogamous nor an inherited post in Toucouleur people's long history, but it has been rare for lower caste people to become religious specialists, states Rüdiger Seesemann, as they were viewed as not sufficiently adhering to the "clerical standards of piety".

=== Marriage ===
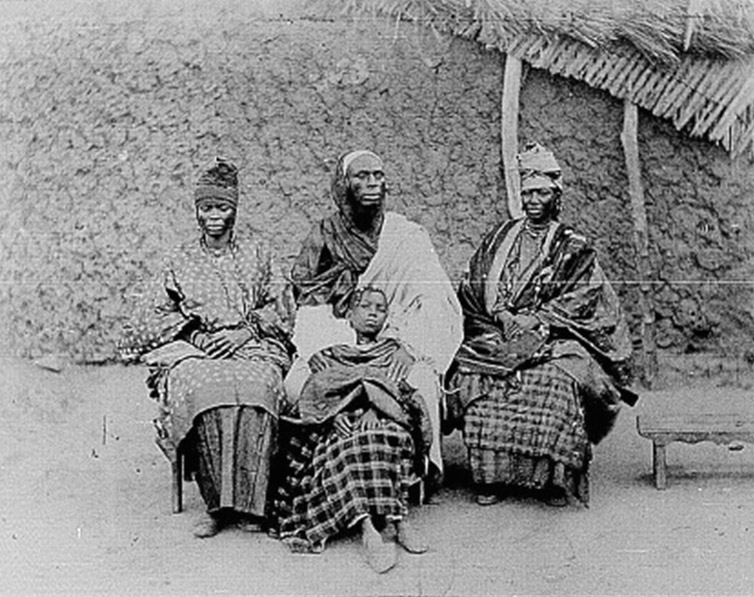
A Toucouleur interpreter called Alpha Sega with his sisters. Image taken in 1882.

Marriage among the Toucouleurs requires a bride price payable to the bride's family. A girl from a high-social-status family, such as one of noble lineage, expects substantially higher payment than one of lower status, such as artisan castes or with slave lineage.

The marriage is validated by a mosque. The bride comes to live with her husband's joint family. Traditionally, before the marriage is consummated, the bride's aunt checks if the girl is a virgin, then bathes and massages her. The bride and groom then join in a wedding feast where the village members join in, marking the start of a new couple.

=== Childbirth and naming ===
One week after pémbougale (childbirth), the baby is named and a gorgol (sister of the father) cuts the child's hair. The father tells the marabout the name he has chosen, after which the marabout whispers the name in the infant's ear and prays. Following this, the marabout informs a gawlo (griot) of the name that has been chosen, and the griot announces the name to the village.
