= Samorian State =

1878–1898 empire in West Africa

Coordinates: 10°51′36.2″N 14°25′26.6″W

Samorian state Samoridugu
- 1878–1898
- Flag

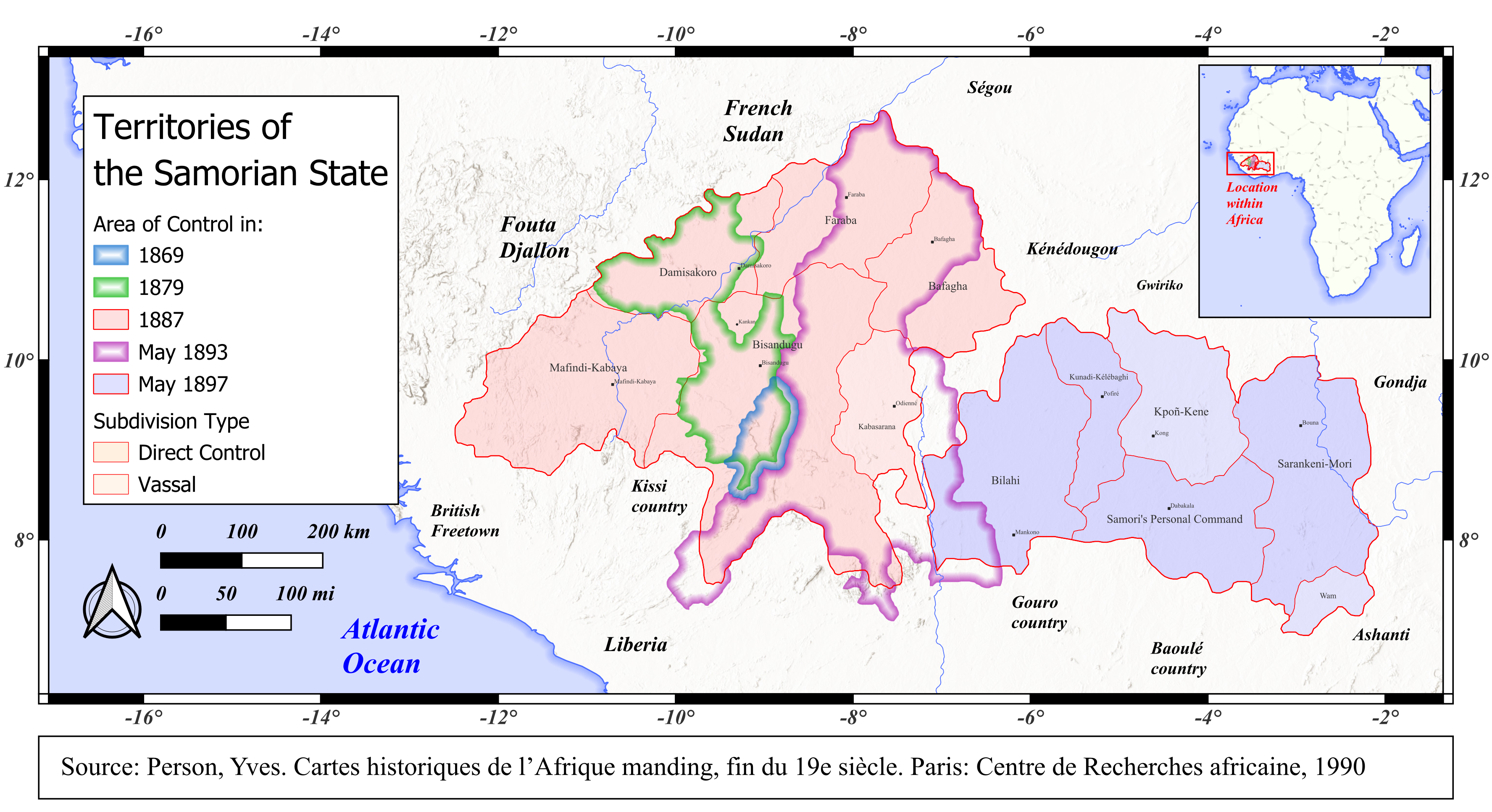
- The territorial evolution of the Samorian State
- Capital: Bissandugu
- Common languages: Arabic (official); Mandinka
- Religion: Sunni Islam
- Government: Monarchy
- Faama
  - 1878–1898: Samori Ture
- History
  - Established: 1878
  - Disestablished: 29 September 1898
Preceded by
Baté Empire
Toucouleur Empire
Kong Empire
Succeeded by
French West Africa
Sierra Leone Colony and Protectorate
- Today part of: Côte d'Ivoire; Guinea; Mali; Sierra Leone

The Samorian state, also referred to as the Wassoulou empire, Ouassalou empire, Mandinka empire or Samory's empire, was a short-lived West African state that existed from roughly 1878 until 1898, although dates vary from source to source. It spanned from what is now southwestern Mali and upper Guinea, with its capital in Bissandugu; it expanded further south into Northern Sierra Leone and east into northern Ivory Coast before its downfall.

== Name ==
The state founded by Samory Toure did not have an official name. Scholars often refer to it as 'Samory's state/empire' or a version thereof. At the time the inhabitants commonly called the state Samoridugu, roughly translating to 'Samori's home', for lack of a better name. The term Wassoulou Empire became widely used in the 20th century, including in the empire's former territory. This name, however, originated from Marie Étienne Péroz's memoirs of his time as a French colonial officer and was derived from his conflation of Samory Toure's larger empire and Wassoulou, a historical region conquered by Toure and his army.

== History ==
=== Early years ===
The death of Umar Tall, founder of the Toucouleur Empire, in 1864 functionally split his empire between his sons and opened political space for local rulers to re-assert their independence. Samory Toure was one of the most prominent of this generation of leaders.

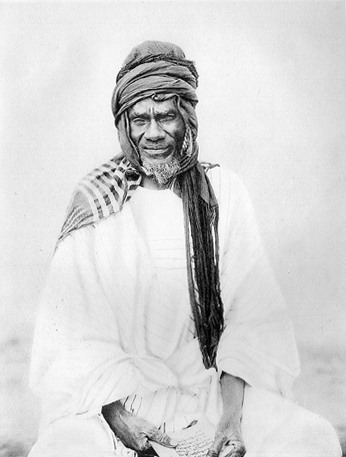
Samory Touré

After taking control of a small warband, he managed to extend his influence over all of the Toron region either by force or diplomacy, building alliances with the powerful Konate family of Gbodou and the leaders of Bissandougou. This first expansionist phase, lasting from 1866 to 1873, saw Samory's army and influence grow dramatically as members of his mother's Camara clan and numerous other volunteers were attracted by his success.

In 1875 the Bate Empire, a theocratic state ruled by the Kaba dynasty of Kankan, sent commissioners to Touré asking for an alliance against his pagan neighbors, particularly the Condé clan based in Gbérédou. Samory accepted, sealing the pact with a meeting at Tintioule. With his Kaba allies, Toure conquered Kouroussa, Norassoba, Baro and other important towns. He also established diplomatic relations with Aguibou Tall (son of Umar Tall) of Dinguiraye in 1878, then an alliance with the almamy of the Imamate of Futa Jallon Ibrahima Sory Dara in 1879.

The army captured the Bure gold mining district on the border of Mali and Guinea to become more financially stable and continue trade, and by 1878 Toure had declared himself Faama (Emperor), with Bissandugu as his capital. He took up the Islamic title of Almamy in 1884.

=== Colonial conflict ===
During the late 19th century Scramble for Africa European colonization of Africa began to speed up, and Samory's state came into regular conflict with France.

In late 1881 Gustave Borgnis-Desbordes, commander of the French garrison at Kita in present-day Mali, sent an envoy to Samory Toure to announce that Kiniéran was now a French protectorate. Unimpressed, Toure sacked the town on February 21, 1882. A French relief column arrived too late, but pursued the army, which turned and fought at Samayah on the 26th. The sofas' traditional frontal charges became a slaughter when faced with the latest French weaponry, but Samory quickly pivoted by adopting effective guerilla tactics and hit-and-run cavalry attacks. They harassed the French back to the Niger. This victory won Toure a reputation as the African leader who could stand up to the invading toubab, massively boosting his prestige and recruitment, as well as providing a blueprint for future engagements.

In the aftermath of Samaya, some of the leaders of Bamako began making overtures to Toure. The French, eager to possess this key strategic town on the Niger, rushed a force to establish a fort there on February 1, 1883. Kebe Brema, Samori's brother, led a force to Bamako to lure the French out of their defenses. They fought two battles at Woyo Wayanko creek in early April, with Kebe Brema winning the first but eventually being forced to retreat.

In 1885 Toure sent men to Freetown in Sierra Leone to propose that the empire become a British protectorate. The British rejected the offer in order to avoid conflict with France, but allowed increased trade in the form of selling more rifles to Samory's army.

When an 1885 French expedition attempted to seize the Buré gold fields by capturing Niagassola, Toure counter-attacked. Dividing his army into three columns, he quickly forced them to withdraw. The French were compelled to negotiate the Treaty of Kenieba Koura, signed on March 28, 1886. This pact recognized the Niger as far upstream as Siguiri as the border between the French and Samoridugu.

=== War with Kenedougou ===
At roughly the same time, the frontier on the Bagoe river between Samoridugu and the Kenedougou Kingdom was descending into violence as forces from both sides raided into the other, and Tieba Traore's army sought to spark a rebellion in the Wassoulou region. With famine and instability widespread, when Samory's forces started forcing conversion to Islam and destroying local sacred sites in 1885, the populace rebelled. Rebels massacred sofa garrisons at Siondougou and Fulala. Samory sent Keme Brema to deal with the situation, and he brutally put down the rebellion. By the end of the 1887 dry season, the last holdouts had been starved into submission.

As the Wassoulou region came back under his control, Samory signed the treaty of Bissandougou with the French. The terms were similar to the treaty signed the year before. With the French now supposed allies, he turned his full force against Kenedougou, beginning a siege of their capital Sikasso in April that would last 15 months.<

The siege marked the Empire's high water mark and the beginning of its decline. The Tata of Sikasso was one of the most well-developed defensive systems in West Africa at the time, and Samory had no artillery. His supply lines relied on porters to bring food and ammunition from Bissandougou through still-hostile Bambara territory. Roads became quagmires during the rainy season, and dysentery struck the army, devastating the men and killing Kebe Brema among other important leaders. Meanwhile the French, far from acting as allies, had built a fort at Siguiri and were blocking all trade with the Sahel or Senegal, devastating the economy. When a rumor began that Samory himself was dead, another massive rebellion broke out. By the end of the 1888 rainy season, he was forced to abandon the siege. His starving, desperate troops again brutally sacked Wassoulou, massacring any rebels they found.

=== Fall of Kankan and Bissandougou ===
In February 1889 Samory and the French signed yet another treaty, this time at Niako, that pushed colonial control further south. The Empire was vulnerable after the debacle at Sikasso, and the British stopped selling them breechloading guns in accordance with the Brussels Conference Act of 1890.

In March 10, 1891, a French force under Colonel Louis Archinard set out from Nyamina for a surprise attack on Kankan. He expected to subdue Samory in a few weeks with a lightning campaign. Knowing his fortifications could not stop French artillery, Toure began a war of manoeuvre and scorched earth. Archinard had little trouble capturing Kankan on April 11 and then a deserted Bissandougou, but Toure had left little worth taking.

Archinard's replacement, Colonel Humbert arrived in Kankan in January 1892 and led a small, well-supplied force of picked men on another attack on Bissandougou. The French installed garrisons at Bissandougou and Kerouane. Samory convened another council at Frankonedou on May 9, 1892 where they decided to move east and rebase the empire in Kabadougou, devastating each area before evacuating it to delay French pursuit.

During the first months of 1893 the French, although unable to corner Toure's armies in Guinea, did manage to capture Faranah and block resupply routes to Liberia and Sierra Leone, the army's primary source of modern weaponry. This left Samory reliant on a longer route through the Gold Coast. His vassals in Kissidougou and the rest of the western- and southernmost parts of the empire surrendered. Samory Toure's empire in the Manding region was now gone.

=== Kong and Bouna ===
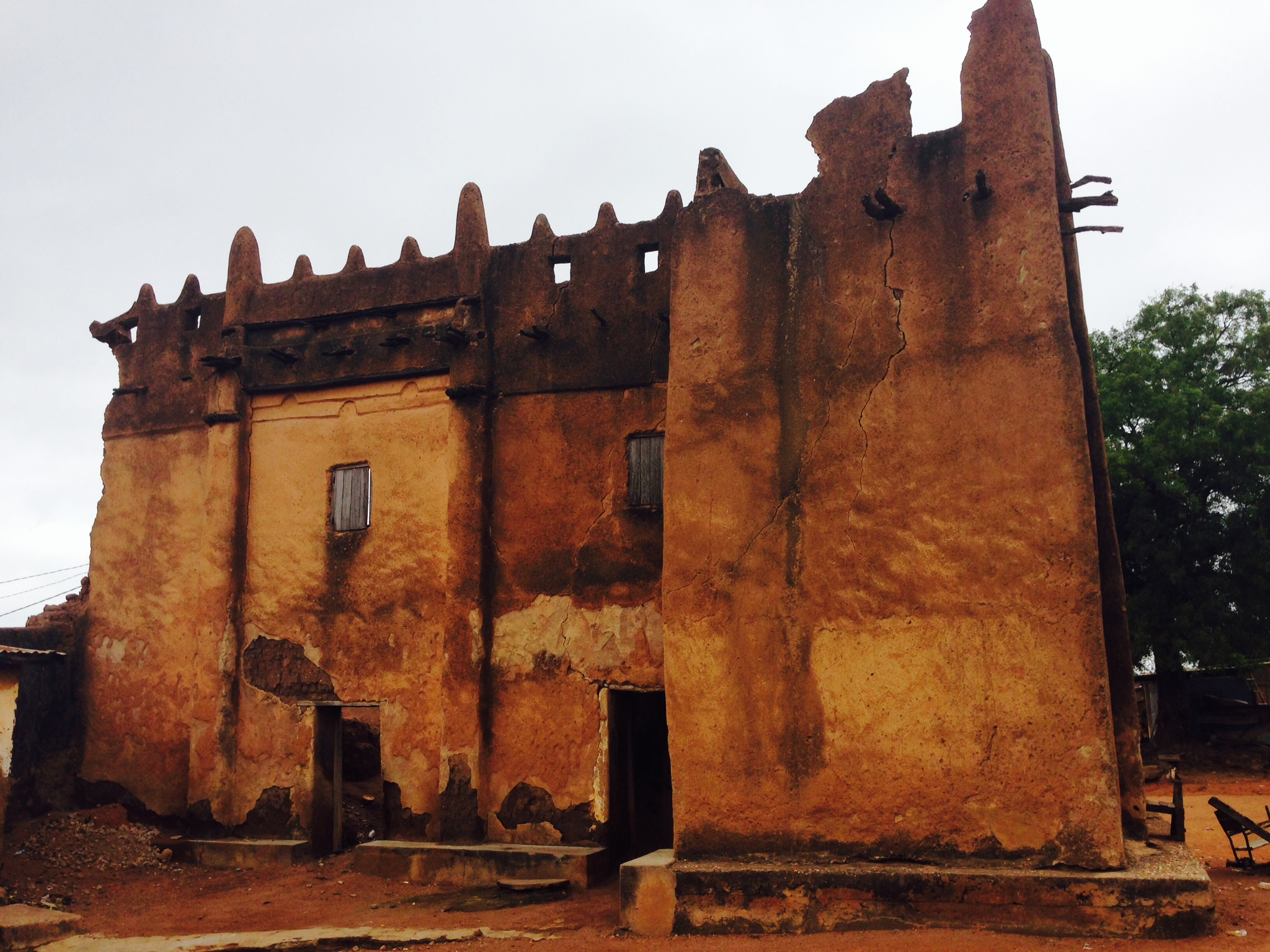
Ruins of Samori Ture's residence at Bondoukou

Samory moved his base out of Kabadougou toward the Bandama and Comoe River to Dabakala in February 1895. His objective, and the key to the whole region, was the ancient Dyula trading city of Kong. The French sought to secure the city by putting together a column led by Col. Monteil in August 1894, but it did not leave Grand Bassam, however, until February 1895. Its passage sparked a popular resistance movement. Monteil stumbled onto the sofas on March 2; in a battle on the 14th, the French were forced to retreat and abandon Kong, which pledged fealty to Samory in April. The new empire in the east would enjoy nearly two years without significant French intervention.

Toure accorded the city of Kong numerous privileges, but the local Dyula merchants' commerce with the coast, dominated by the French, had slowed since their absorption into Samoridugu. When Samory, looking to push further east into the Gold Coast to secure new sources of guns, retreated rather than fight a French force, they sought to take advantage of his weakness by intercepting arms caravans and opening channels to invite the French back. When the discontent eventually broke into open revolt, Samory destroyed the city on May 23, 1897.

The force that the sofas had encountered was part of France's efforts to control Bouna, and to keep Samory and the British apart. Capt. Paul Braulot came south from the Niger bend to attempt to negotiate another protectorate but was rebuffed, as Toure wanted only to live apart from the French. In April 1897, Governor William Edward Maxwell tried to intimidate Saranken Mori, Samory's son and the commander in the region, into abandoning Bouna. When this failed, a force of the Southern Nigeria Regiment under Henderson marched on the town but were defeated at Dokita, then later routed and Henderson was captured at Wa.

Knowing this setback would prompt an aggressive British response, the French again sent Braulot, at the head of an armed column, to try to acquire Bouna by negotiation. Saranken Mori initially accepted. But when Braulot arrived at Bouna, he was killed and his column destroyed outside the city on August 20, 1897, restarting the war between Samory and the French.

The fall of the Kenedougou capital of Sikasso on May 1, 1898 permitted French colonial forces to launch a concentrated assault against Toure. He was forced to migrate once again, this time towards Liberia. Hoping to live off the land while marching, a combination of the unfamiliar mountainous territory of western Ivory Coast, hostile locals, and colonial attacks turned the campaign into a disaster. Thousands died of starvation. Using information from sofa deserters, the French captain Henri Gouraud surprised Toure's forces at Guelemou on September 29, 1898, and captured the Almamy without a fight. With his capture, Samoridugu ceased to exist.

== Government ==
=== Operation ===
The Samorian state at its height was divided into 62 cantons and 10 provinces, with a population of 300,000 people representing many different ethnicities (Malinke, Senufo, Fula, Mossi, etc.). The head officials, known as keletigi (meaning war chief), were in charge of both the army and the administration of justice in their province. Taxes were generally light.

An important element of Samorian governance were regular grand councils of state that brought together all the most important dignitaries of the empire. On these occasions, they decided major questions and organized conquered territory. Some examples include the 1875 council in Bissandougou to inaugurate the capital and proclaim Samory Toure as faama, the 1884 council that formalized Islam as the state religion, and the 1893 council of Frankonedou where the decision was made to move the center of government east, away from the invading French.

=== Foreign relations ===
Samory Toure maintained a diplomatic mission in Freetown to ensure the protection of caravans and the continued flow of trade, especially in arms, between the British colony and his empire. The French also exchanged regular diplomatic delegations with him. After the 1886 treaty of Kenieba Koura, Samory's son Djaoulen Karamo was sent to Paris on a diplomatic/fact-finding mission. He became a francophile and leaned towards a negotiated settlement rather than war in later years. When he opened a diplomatic back channel for this purpose in April 1894, however, Djaoulen Karamo was starved to death.

The Samorian state boasted a highly efficient intelligence network that the French referred to as the 'African telegraph.' Novice soldiers were sent to French posts to gather information, sometimes taking jobs as servants in officers' households where they would overhear sensitive conversations. Dioula merchants also gathered information and passed it along to military leaders.

Areas along Samoridugu's borders were often chaotic and unstable, with villages being subject to raids from all sides.

== Military ==
The Samorian army was the preeminent government institution, omnipresent in all administrative and political questions. It was well equipped with modern firearms and boasted a complex structure of permanent units divided into an infantry wing of sofa and a cavalry wing. The bilakoro, uncircumcised novices, served as pages for the soldiers. In 1887 Samori could field 30,000 to 35,000 infantry and about 3,000 cavalry, in regular squadrons of 50 each. There was also a reserve, 1 out of every 10 men from every village, such that each of the empire's 10 provinces could furnish 10,000 men. Even during the move east out of the Manding region, the Samorian army consisted of some 12,000 infantry, 2,000 cavalry, and an overall retinue of some 120,000 people. While the best-armed troops resisted the French using repeater rifles (either purchased, captured, or manufactured locally), those armed with the bolt-action Chassepot conquered new territory to the east to use as a strategic reserve, and men with flintlocks served as the home guard or internal security. This system enabled Samory to fall back into territory already conquered and organized, leaving no food for the French for 7 years. The discipline and organization of the Samorian army was comparable to and modeled after that of contemporary European armies. Communication and regulations were similar, and runaway tirailleurs were employed as trainers. The strict discipline, as well as threats of punishment and promises of reward or promotion, kept order in the ranks.

== Economy ==
The majority of people living in the empire were subsistence farmers. The state engaged in large-scale commerce to coastal trading cities selling ivory, wax, hides, rubber, and gold, all carried by slaves who were also sold. The proceeds purchased the arms and ammunition necessary to maintain the army. Regular caravans also went north to Bamako and Bobo-Dioulasso to purchase horses.

As Samoridugu came under more and more pressure from the French, they were forced to turn increasingly to the slave trade to fund the war. By the 1880s economic stability was very reliant on the influx of plunder and the internal slave trade fueled by war captives or refugees selling themselves into slavery.

=== Arms industry ===
Samori built a well-organised and centrally controlled arms industry in his empire focused on providing cutting-edge military technology to the soldiers. By 1873 he had gathered local smiths in Bissandougou to build and repair firearms, and created a commandand hierarchy for them that was integrated with the military. In 1886 he sent Musa Kaba to France, accompanying Samory's son Dyaule-Karamogho, with instructions to conduct industrial esponiage on French arsenals. With this information, as well as some rifles stolen from French forces in Kayes, he built a domestic arms industry. Entire villages were set aside as manufacturing centers, allowing for assembly line production with hundreds of smiths specializing in various parts. These were standardized, and so could be used to repair various rifles. By 1889, the smiths had produced working copies of the Gras, Mauser and Kropatschek rifles. 12 guns were produced a week and roughly 200–300 cartridges a day.

While this was a groundbreaking and potentially revolutionary solution to one of Samory's key challenges, namely access to modern weaponry without having to draw down the human or capital reserves of the empire, the domestic arms industry did not fully resolve the problem. Despite the large-scale organization, the blacksmiths were never able to provide the quantity of guns necessary to supply the entire army. Samoridugu also did not have the technology to build blast furnaces, and without this the casting of artillery was impossible, and making quality gun barrels was also very difficult. Importation from British Sierra Leone remained a critical source of weaponry for Samory Toure.

== Society and religion ==
Particularly after the 1884 codification of Islam as the state religion, it was an important structure and model for building the empire and uniting its diverse inhabitants. Mosques were built in many conquered areas, a judicial system based on Islam principles was put in place, and animist practices were suppressed. The state sponsored Quranic schools throughout the empire, and Samory Toure would often inspect schools in areas he passed through, interviewing students, rewarding good teachers and publicly reprimanding bad ones. In strongly animist areas, the population found this Islamization to be a threat to their cultural traditions and after 1885 revolts became more common; these had to be put down on top of fighting a war against the French. Overall, Samory Toure's heavy-handed methods of proselytization largely failed, and these animist communities converted to Islam only after the fall of the Samorian Empire.
