= Mandingo Wars =

1883–1898 Franco-Samorian wars

- Part of the Scramble for Africa
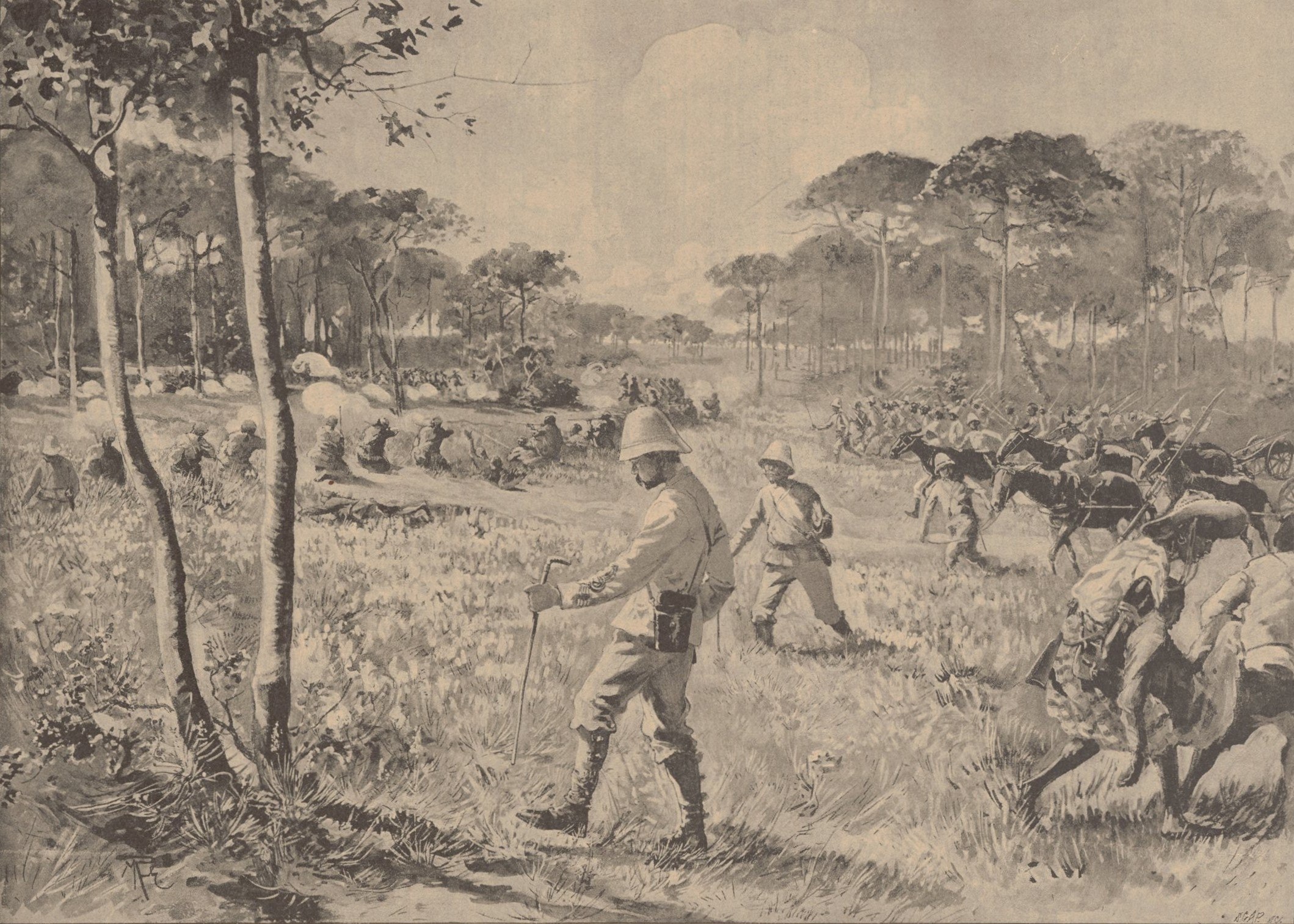
- Colonel Monteil's Expedition - Combat of Sobala (Le Monde illustré magazine, 1895)
Date	1882–1898 (15 years)
Location	West Africa
Result	French victory
Territorial changes	Wassoulou Empire annexed into French West Africa.

Belligerents
France: Kong Empire	Wassoulou Empire

Commanders and leaders
Henri Gouraud; Louis Archinard; Pierre Humbert	Samori Ture; Keme Brema; Saranken Mori

Strength
50,000	60,000 riflemen 5,000 cavalry

The Mandingo Wars (Note: Also sometimes called the Franco-Samorian Wars.) were a series of conflicts from 1882 to 1898 between France and the Wassoulou Empire of the Mandingo people led by Samori Ture. Comparatively, the French faced serious resistance by the Mandinka, as they were able to make use of firearms and tactics that impeded French expansion in the area. The French were ultimately triumphant and established dominance over Mali, Guinea and the Ivory Coast.

== First Mandingo War (1882–1886) ==
In early 1882 Gustave Borgnis-Desbordes, commander of the French garrison at Kita in present-day Mali, sent an envoy to Samory Toure to announce that Kiniéran was now a French protectorate. Unimpressed, Toure sacked the town on February 21, 1882. A French relief column arrived too late, but pursued the Wassoulou army, which turned and fought at Samaya on the 26th. The sofas traditional frontal charges became a slaughter when faced with the latest French weaponry, but Samory quickly pivoted by adopting effective guerilla tactics and hit-and-run cavalry attacks. They harassed the French back to the Niger. This victory won Toure a reputation as the African leader who could stand up to the invading toubab, massively boosting his prestige and recruitment, as well as providing a blueprint for future engagements.

In the aftermath of Samaya, some of the leaders of Bamako began making overtures to Toure. The French, eager to possess this key strategic town on the Niger, rushed a force to establish a fort there on February 1, 1883. Kebe Brema, Samori's brother, led a force to Bamako to lure the French out of their defenses. They fought two battles at Woyo Wayanko creek in early April, with Kebe Brema winning the first but eventually being forced to retreat.

When an 1885 French expedition under Col. A. V. A. Combes attempted to seize the Buré gold fields by capturing Niagassola, Toure counter-attacked. Dividing his army into three mobile columns, he worked his way around the French lines of communication and quickly forced them to withdraw. Already embroiled in conflict with Mahmadu Lamine and the Toucouleur Empire, the French were compelled to negotiate the Treaty of Kenieba Koura, signed on March 28, 1886. This pact recognized French hegemony over the left bank of the Niger as far upstream as Siguiri, and Samory's control of Bure and the Manding region. As part of the agreement, Samory's eldest son and heir Djaoulen-Karamo was sent on a diplomatic/fact finding/goodwill mission to France. Thus, the first war ended as a Samorian victory.

== Second Mandingo War (1891–1895) ==
On March 10, 1891, a French force under Colonel Louis Archinard set out from Nyamina for a surprise attack on Kankan. He expected to subdue Samory in a few weeks with a lightning campaign. Knowing his fortifications could not stop French artillery, Toure began a war of manoeuvre and scorched earth. Archinard had little trouble capturing Kankan on April 11 and then a deserted Bissandougou, but Toure had left little worth taking.

Archinard's replacement Col. Pierre Humbert arrived in Kankan in January 1892 and led a small, well-supplied force of picked men on another attack on Bissandougou. The sofas fought defensive battles at the Soumbe and Diamanko creeks the 11th and 12th, taking heavy casualties but doing serious damage to the French and nearly capturing the enemy artillery, but could not save the once-again abandoned city. The French kept chasing Samori's army south, facing ambushes, guerilla warfare, and scorched earth the whole way, installing garrisons at Bissandougou and Kerouane. At a council at Frankonedou on May 9, 1892, Samory and his allies decided to turn east and rebase the empire in Kabadougou, devastating each area before evacuating it to delay French pursuit.

During the first months of 1893 the French, although unable to corner Toure's armies in Guinea, did manage to capture Faranah and block resupply routes to Liberia and Sierra Leone, Wassoulou's primary source of modern weaponry. The Wassoulou vassals in Kissidougou and the rest of the western- and southernmost parts of the empire surrendered.

Toure's new objective in the east, and the key to the whole region, was the ancient Dyula trading city of Kong. The city had nominally accepted French protection during Louis-Gustave Binger's visit in 1892, and the colonial leaders sought to formalize this relationship by putting together a column led by Col. Monteil in August 1894. The force did not leave Grand Bassam, however, until February 1895, and its arrival sparked a popular resistance movement. Monteil stumbled onto the sofas on March 2, to the surprise of both sides; in a battle on the 14th, the French were forced to retreat and abandon Kong, which pledged fealty to Samory in April. This began a two year period of peace.

== Third Mandingo War (1897–1898) ==
France wanted to control Bouna while keeping Samory and the British apart. Capt. Paul Braulot came south from the Niger bend to attempt to negotiate a protectorate agreement but was rebuffed, as Toure wanted only to live apart from the French. In April 1897, British Governor William Edward Maxwell of the Gold Coast tried to intimidate Saranken Mori, Samory's son and the commander in the region, into abandoning Bouna. When this failed, a force of the Southern Nigeria Regiment under Henderson marched on the town but were defeated at the Battle of Dokita, then later routed and Henderson was captured at Wa.

Knowing this setback would prompt an aggressive British response, the French again sent Braulot, at the head of an armed column, to try to acquire Bouna by negotiation. Saranken Mori initially accepted. But when Braulot arrived at Bouna, he was killed and his column destroyed outside the city on August 20, 1897, restarting the war between the French and Samory Toure.

The fall of the Kenedougou capital of Sikasso on May 1, 1898, permitted French colonial forces to launch a concentrated assault against Toure. He soon was forced to migrate once again, this time towards Liberia. Hoping to live off the land while marching, a combination of the unfamiliar mountainous territory of western Ivory Coast, hostile locals, and colonial attacks turned the campaign into a disaster. Using information from sofa deserters, the French captain Henri Gouraud surprised Toure's forces at Guelemou on September 29, 1898, and captured the Almamy without a fight.
