= Battles of Woyowoyanko =

The Battles of Woyowoyanko were two military engagements fought near the Woyowoyanko river in April 1883, during the wars between France and the Wassulu Empire of Samori Ture in West Africa.

== Background ==
The first hostilities between France and Samori Ture began in early 1882, after Samori's forces laid siege to the village of Kiniéran. As this village was allied to the pro-French village of Kita, where the French had an outpost, its inhabitants sent a request for assistance to the French garrison in Kita. Refusing to engage hostilities with the warlord without orders, the commander of the French outpost, Captain Monségur, sent an envoy to Samori, in attempt to convince him to lift the siege. However, Samori made the French envoy prisoner, an action that prompted Colonel Borgnis-Desbordes to engage in retaliations against the Wassulu. With a column of 220 men, Borgnis-Desbordes engaged in several skirmishes with Wassulu forces during February 1882.

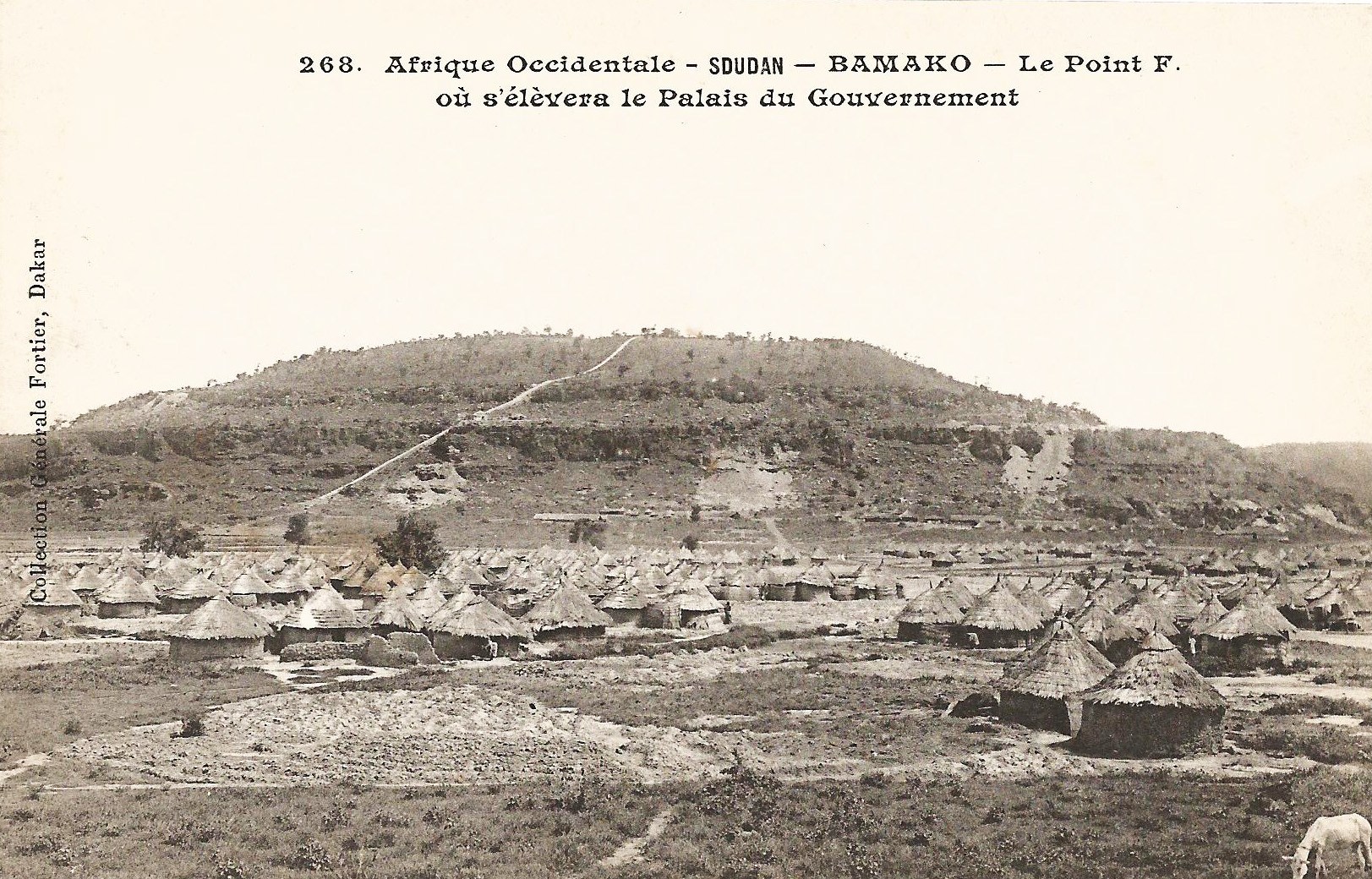
Bamako at the turn of the 20th century.

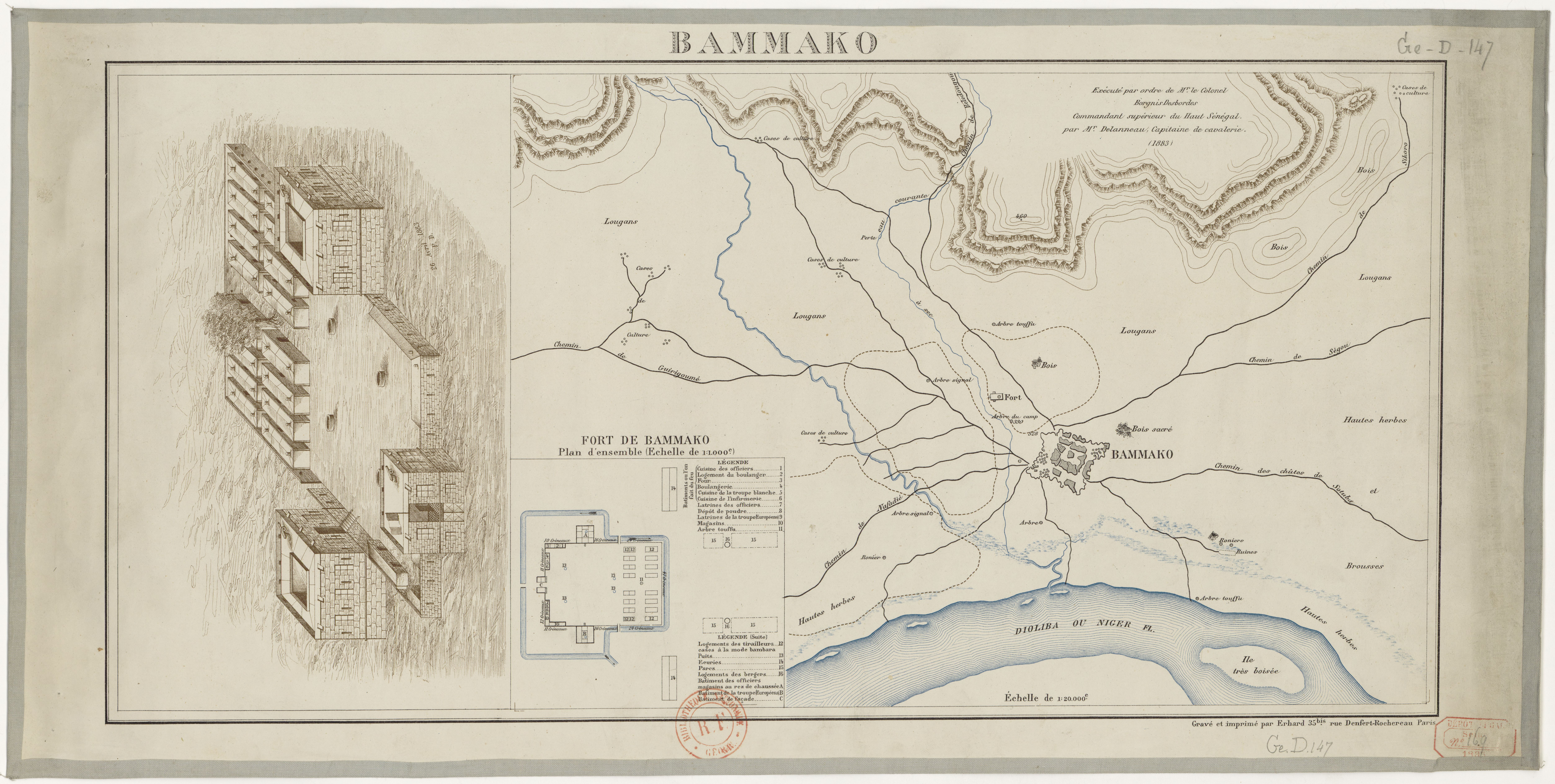
Map of Bamako in April 1883.

On 22 November 1882, a French column of 542 soldiers under Colonel Borgnis-Desbordes left the French outpost of Kayes in order to occupy the village of Bamako. This village of several thousands inhabitants held a relative importance in the region, and Borgnis-Desbordes wanted to establish a permanent French outpost on this location before it could fall into the hands of Samori's forces. Marching slowly, the column reached the French post of Kita on 16 December. The column left Kita on 7 January, and, after fighting a skirmish at Daba on 16 January, eventually reached Bamako on the morning of 1 February 1883.

The French promptly started to build a military fort in Bamako and began the construction of a telegraphic line linking it to Kayes. By March 1883, the situation was rather dire for the French, as illness and skirmishes had left them with only about 450 men fit for combat out of their initial force of 542 soldiers.

== First Battle of Woyowoyanko ==
First Battle of Woyowoyanko
- Part of the First Mandingo War
Date	2 April 1883
Location	Woyowoyanko river, near Bamako
Result	Wassoulou victory

Belligerents
France	Wassoulou Empire

Commanders and leaders
Gustave Borgnis-Desbordes	Fabu Ture

Strength
242	~3,000

Casualties and losses
light	light

In March 1883, Samori's brother Fabu Ture (also referred to as Keme Brema or Keme Bourama), at the head of about 3,000 Wassulu warriors, devastated several pro-French villages around Bamako, and destroyed the telegraphic line that had been erected by the French.

On 30 March, a detachment under Captain Piétri was sent toward the outpost of Guinina, where Wassulu warriors had attacked the telegraphic line. Arriving there on 1 April, Piétri found no trace of the enemy, but some survivors from the village of Sibi, that had been ravaged by Wassulu warriors, told him of a Wassulu presence near the village of Kalasa. Piétri and his men spent the next week skirmishing with small Wassulu parties in the area, before eventually regaining Bamako on 9 April.

On the morning of 2 April, Colonel Borgnis-Desbordes led a 242-man strong column to attack the position where the Wassulu force was camping, on the shores of the Woyowoyanko river, a few kilometers away from Bamako. Borgnis-Desbordes, hoping to achieve a quick victory with a bold assault, ordered a frontal attack. After crossing the river, Captain Fournier's company of Senegalese tirailleurs was initially successful in pushing back the enemy lines, but the French were eventually flanked on both sides and ended up having to withdraw to the other side of the river.

By midday, seeing that his men were exhausted by thirst and heat, Colonel Borgnis-Desbordes decided to retreat to Bamako rather than attempt another assault. Though their losses had been rather light, this engagement was a failure for the French, who had their attack checked by the Wassulu warriors.

== Second Battle of Woyowoyanko ==
Second Battle of Woyowoyanko
- Part of the First Mandingo War
Date	12 April 1883
Location	Woyowoyanko River, near Bamako
Result	Military stalemate, Wassoulou withdrawal

Belligerents
France	Wassoulou Empire

Commanders and leaders
Gustave Borgnis-Desbordes	Fabu Ture

Strength
371	~3,000

Casualties and losses
light	relatively light

For the next week, both forces retained their respective positions, with Fabu's Wassoulou cavalry making occasional raids on Bamako. On 9 April, Captain Piétri detachment came back to Bamako. Once he deemed that Piétri's men had gotten enough rest, Colonel Borgnis-Desbordes decided to attempt another attack on the Woyowoyanko river, with his force that now counted 371 soldiers and an artillery section.

On 12 April at dawn, the French departed Bamako and set toward the Wassoulou camp. This time Borgnis-Desbordes attempted no frontal attack, and instead opted for an envelopment, sending his vanguard through a badly guarded defile to turn the Wassoulou positions.

The manoeuvre succeeded, and the Wassoulou army soon began to withdraw before the French could fully envelop them, with only a few hundred warriors continuing to fight to slow down the French advance. In the abandoned Wassoulou camp, the French found a large quantity of food, which came in handy to them as their poor supply chain had left them suffering from hunger during the previous month.

Their lack of cavalry preventing the French from capitalizing on the enemy withdrawal, the losses of the Wassoulou remained relatively light.

== Legacy ==
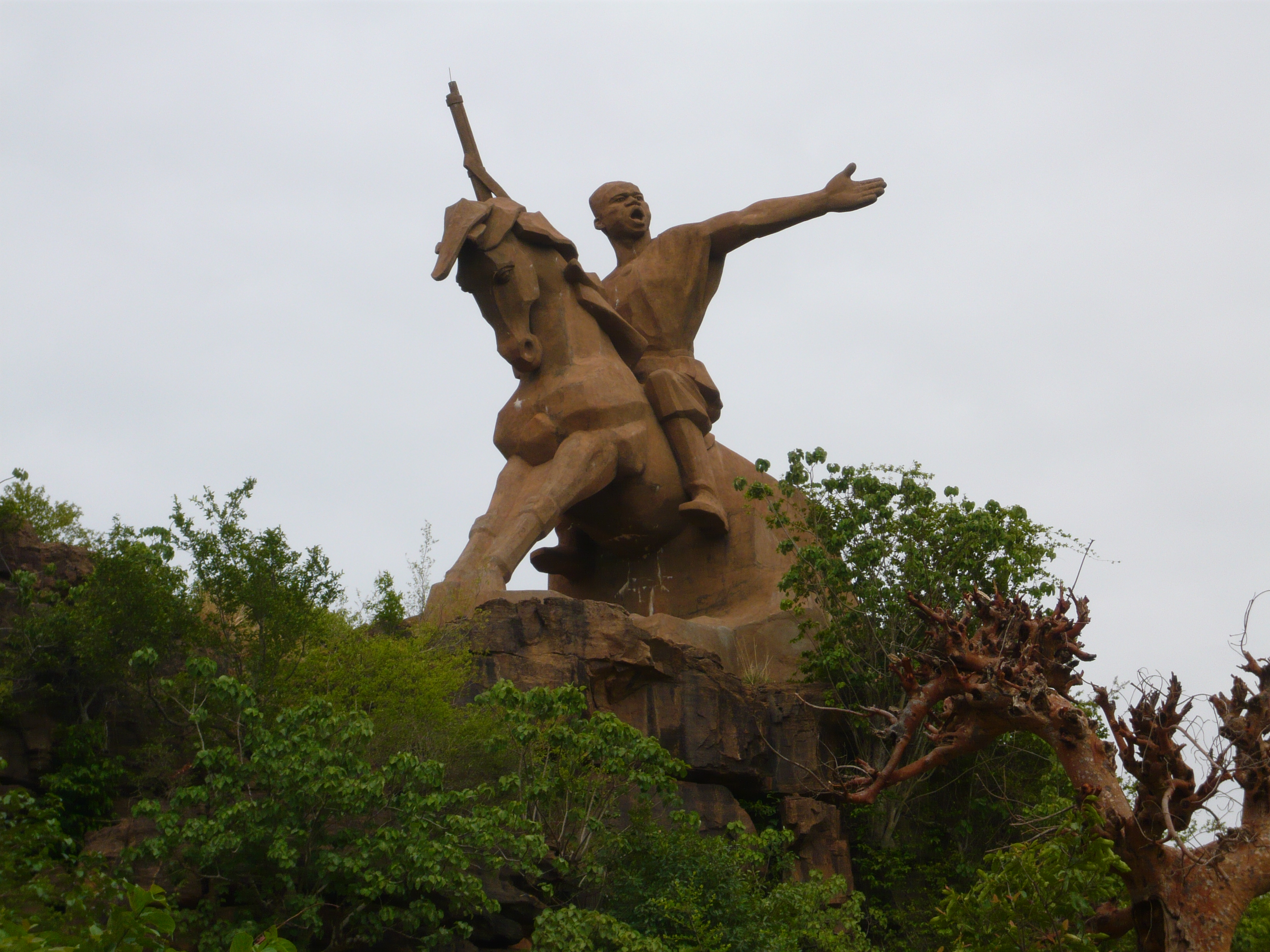
Statue of a Wassulu warrior on the location of the battlefield.

Despite being short-lived and strategically insignificant, the success of 2 April 1883 has retained a great cultural importance in Mali, where it is seen as a symbol of African resistance against French colonialism.

Although anachronistic, as Samori and his warriors were also seen as foreign oppressors by the people of late 19th century Mali, who hated them for their unprecedented brutality and mass enslavement of the locals, this point of view has gained a lot of traction in the modern era, as resentment against French colonial rule and Pan-African ideology in post-independence Mali has led to Samori's memory being vindicated and he came to be recognized as a national hero.

In 2001, the Malian government created the "Parc des Sofas" on the location of the battle, to honor the memory of Wassulu warriors. A large statue depicting a sofa of Samori's army was erected.
