= Kabadougou Kingdom =

Ivorian kingdom (1848–1980)

Coordinates: 9.5014°N 7.5625°W

Kingdom of Kabadougou
- 1848–1980
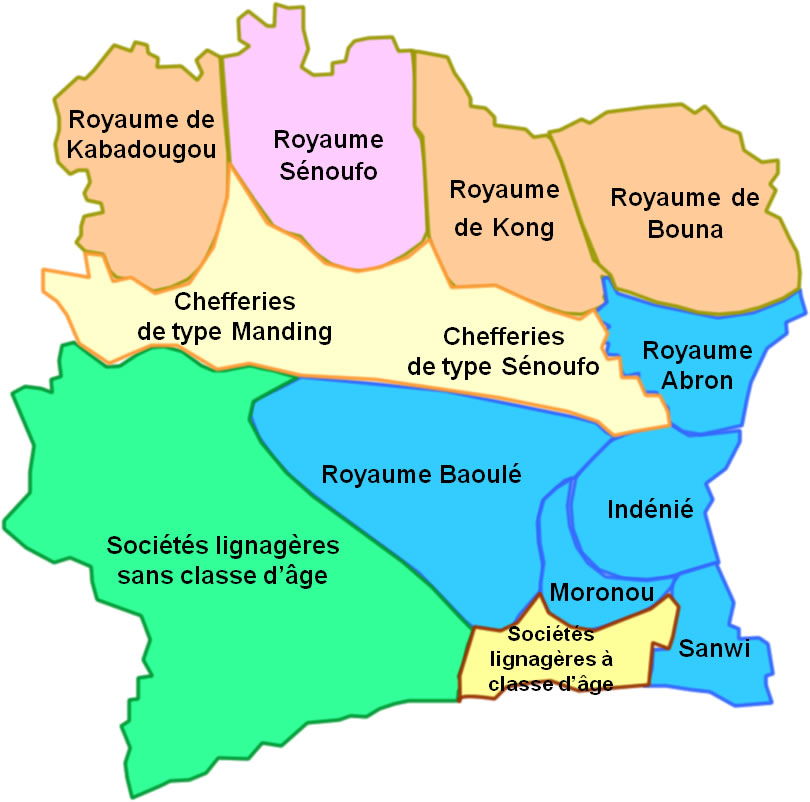
- Ivorian kingdoms before colonization.
- Status: Independent state (1848–1898); Chiefdom within a nation state (1898–1980)
- Capital: Odienné
- Religion: Islam
- Government: Absolute monarchy, later Chiefdom
- Faama, later chief
  - 1848–1858: Vakaba Touré
  - 1858–1859: Ibrahima Touré
  - 1859–1875: VaMuktar Touré
  - 1875–1893: Magbe Touré
  - 1893–1899: Moriba Touré
  - 1899–1901: Mody Tourè
  - 1901–1902: Lanténé Torè
  - 1903–1934: Ibrahima Touré II
  - c. 1980: Muktar Toure
- History
  - Established: 1848
  - Last confirmed ruler: 1980

Population
  - 1898: 19,000
  - 1900: 14,000
- Currency: Slave trade
| Preceded by |
| Kingdom of Nafana |
- Today part of: Côte d'Ivoire; Guinea

The Kabadougou Kingdom was a Malinké warrior kingdom situated in north-west Côte d'Ivoire centered on the town of Odienné and bordered the Kingdom of Worodougou. It was ruled by the Touré dynasty, whose founder centered the society around slavery. The dynasty in an alliance with Samori Ture fought French colonization until 1898.

== Independence ==
=== Foundation of a slave society ===
The kingdom was founded by Vakaba Touré, a former dyula (trader), in 1848. Touré switched to being a marfatigi (gun-wielding warrior) and was in the service of Mori Wali Cisse and Karamogoba Diabi. In 1845, he with his cousin Vasanissi went to defend maternal relatives in Kulukoro against Cisse, Vanassi killed Cisse in an ambush and the cousins convinced his army to support them in an attack against the Diarrasouba Kingdom of Nafana. This force drove out the Diarrasouba and Vakaba established Odienné, his hometown, as the capital. The local kafu Massala served as an early ally but Folon and Bodougou were forcefully annexed. Samatiguila retained independence and was closely associated, and whose Diabi religious and business class was among other leaders as well as warriors a recipient slaves. Touré altered the social structure and divided horonyi (freemen) into the elite warrior class and trader allies, with remnants diminishing in status. Atop the military hierarchy was the faama, whose commanding force consisted of the sofakuntigiyi (slave generals), who were owned by the faama. The sofayi (soldiers) alternated between service and agricultural production. He had almost every village within his military's reach subjugated to the level of jonya (slavery), which was already present but less widespread. The kafus of Bodougou, Foulodougou, Nafana, and Nohoulou were attacked, with villages being destroyed, and prime targets for slave raiding. In the jonya system, it was theorized that slaves' children were to be free upon birth, but the need for bodies to support constant war efforts, exacerbated by French colonization in the kingdom's later history, caused this concept to be entirely dismissed. Similar to practices of the Ségou Empire, the warrior elite would designate conquered and captured peoples to agricultural production, conscription, or have them sold for resources incapable of being produced. Slaves would be sold north and west for guns and horses; they were sold south to the Bété and Gouro for cloth, kola nuts, and ivory.

Slaves were divided into three categories: captives, woloso, and forobajon. Forobajonyi were meant to be slaves for the community but were de facto personally owned by the Touré.

The kingdom was split into provinces while administration was focused in Odienné. The capital was fortified by two jin (defense walls) and an outer chain of 17 villages known as the sofadougou. These villages were populated with agricultural and military captives subject to immediate conscription for military affairs.

=== French colonization ===
Vakaba's rule ended in 1858 when, according to local tradition, he died due to an infected ant bite. His son Ibrahima (Note: Also spelled as VaBréma.) died within a year of succession during a lost battle at Korumba campaigning in Fuladu in 1859. Ibrahima's brother, VaMuktar (Note: Also spelled as Vamukutar), ruled until 1875. His successor Magbe Madou put down a revolt between 1878 and 1879, by 1880 reestablishing unstable control. In July 1881, the brothers' nephew Samori Ture arrived with an alliance proposal. It was accepted by Madou who then received Ture's favorite daughter's, Soronasi, hand in marriage. Within this alliance Kabadougou was a periphery state but retained its independence. In 1888, Madou initiated a war against Diarrasouba Nafana and their ally, the Senufo of Nōōlu, when attacking the kola-producing Worodougou. In early 1892, Samori moved his armies to Kabadougou for a temporary stay in his travel to central Ivory Coast after his military failures against Louis Archinard and Henri Humbert in his old territory. That year Madou requested support in his war as his army was not strong enough. To the dismay of the French who hoped to ally with Nafana and Nōōlu, in August 1892 an allied force defeated the Diarrasouba at the battle of Kungbéni. The use of gunpowder firearms as opposed to cartridge left the Diarrasouba at a disadvantage during the rainy season, and whose retreating forces drowned in creeks and rivers. In the aftermath of the war, of Nafana's 170 villages 14 remained. In February 1893, Samori fled with assistance of Madou's forces due to an arriving French column commanded by Colonel Michel Combes. On 9 February, it went to Gbèlèba which was already burning and empty; the same occurred when he went to Odienné on 13 February. On 14 February, Koro was taken by a vanguard commanded by Captain Prost. Combes's pursuit ended in failure and French forces left.

Madou left for Dabakala with Samori in 1893, leaving his brother, Moriba Touré, to rule. Moriba's rule was characterized by his constant attempts to play off of Samori and the French to maintain power. His rule began with Odienné and Gbèlèba still burning, with the French outposted in the west at Bissandugu, Kerwané, and Siguiri. He refused to let people return to the areas affected by Samori's scorched earth between the Niger and Sankarani rivers as demanded by the latter. Those caught were sold for horses. Tension emerged between Moriba and Samori stemming from the former's lack of supplementary horses and retaliation against encroachment on his rule, even possibly wishing for his brother's permanent absence. Despite this tension, Samori still presented his relationship with Moriba to the French as confidently secure. Moriba however continued diplomatic attempts to manipulate the French, espousing hatred for Samori, love for the French, and asserted that he wished to reconquer lands as well as retain his slaves. His mode of communication was with the post at Bissandugu. Moriba declined the requests to build a post in Kabadougou May 1897 and to house a French official in and October, declaring he did not want an outpost in his territory and that an official who may visit anytime may reside in their post Bougunni, 225 kilometres (140 mi) north of Odienné, but must always return there. As an act of appeasement, he sent 10,000 kilograms (22,000 lb) of grain to the post at Bougunni. He also sent his son to be educated in Kayes, French Sudan. Dismissive of this diplomacy, Commandant Bertin issued for the Odienné post's construction, being done so on 29 December with Lieutenant Woeffel taking command. The struggle between the Touré and French continued.

== French administration ==
This period was referred to as Tubabuyi Wati (English: The Time of the Whites). Moriba was insistent on escaped slaves being returned, all areas ruled by Vakaba be given to him, that he administer justice, and that Kabadougou forces be free to return to the kingdom if French forces were sent for Samori. He also delayed the construction of a station by sending few workers. Captain Conrard supplanted Woeffel on 28 January 1898 and still considered Samori the primary concern. Samori's forces and people began to flee to Liberia as they anticipated an overwhelming French attack. Between 13 August and 13 September, 981 refugees came to Kabadougou. On 28 September Samori and Madou were captured at Géulé and exiled to French Gabon and Timbuktu, French Sudan, respectively. Madou returned to Odienné in 1905 and lived the remainder of his life peacefully, dying in 1912.

Like the kingdom, colonial forces became dependent on slave labor. They would be used to assist in transportation of materials and were even given to tirailleurs. François Clozel worried for the region's stability in the event of abolition. Since January 1898 tension spurred between Conrard and Moriba and culminated in a feud over stolen captives in February 1899. A foya admitted two were located at one of thefaama's camps. Two slaves revealed that Moriba ordered foya leader Kurami Moro to steal captives to sell in place of subjects. Conrard did not act as he felt he did not have the proper manpower. On 24 March 1899, the faama and foya were arrested and Ismailia Touré was designated regent; in addition to 455 sofanyi were disarmed. Moriba was tried in Siguiri, deposed, then exiled to Bafoulabe on 6 May. He was then moved to Bingerville where Governor-General of French West Africa Noël Ballay pardoned him on 11 June 1901, returning to Odienné on 10 August. Conrard organized an election that resulted in Mody Swarè Tourè becoming chief on 15 April 1899. Ismailia, despite being favored by Conrard, was unable to acquire the throne as he was not a son of Vakaba; instead, he was named assistant chief, although he died shortly after on 8 May. Swarè's younger brother Lanténé Sidiki Torè replaced him. The French had quickly noticed of his lacking governing capabilities and placed him under forced residence in Séguéla on 16 January 1901. Sidiki replaced him but was also placed under forced residence to a post by the Bandama river in June 1902, caused by his refusal to help Moriba pay off his debts. In 1903, Ibrahima Touré II was sworn in and ruled until 1934.

Commander Le Campion reported that in 1898 Kabadougou had 104 villages with 8 consisting of free men while the rest were made up of slaves; of ~19,000 people, 12,000 were slaves. A report in December 1900, counted 8 villages as populated by freemen, 34 by those owned by the regional chief, and 60 by those owned by the faama and others. It was reported the district of the same name had 3,500 house captives, 4,500 owned by the faama across 51 villages, and 6,000 freemen. When slavery was abolished in 1907 in May it was reported 8,000 to 9,000 freedmen left Kabadougou aimless or seeking out their homes.

== Post-kingdom Touré family ==
In 1980, the ruler of the Odienné region was Muktar Toure, descendent of Vakaba and relative of secretary-general of Democratic Party of Ivory Coast – African Democratic Rally.

It is believed that Touré's descendants are the paramount family of the same name holding the title of canton chief in Odienné that have engaged in clientelism.

== See also ==
- Siccia kabadougou, named after the kingdom

== Bibliography ==
- van Baalen, Sebastian (September 2021). "Local elites, civil resistance, and the responsiveness of rebel governance in Côte d'Ivoire". Journal of Peace Research. 58 (5): 930–944. doi:10.1177/0022343320965675. S2CID 234027513.
- Djité, Paulin G. (29 October 2007). "Language Planning in Côte d'IvoireNon scholea sed vitae discimusWe do not study for academia, but for real life". In Kaplan, Robert B.; Baldauf Jr., Richard B. (eds.). Language Planning and Policy in Africa, Vol. 2. Blue Ridge Summit: Multilingual Matters. pp. 149–184.
- Hellweg, Joseph (2011). Hunting the Ethical State: The Benkadi Movement of Côte D'Ivoire. University of Chicago Press.
- Iliffe, John (1987). The African poor : a history. Cambridge [Cambridgeshire]: Cambridge University Press. ISBN 0521348773.
- O'Sullivan, John M. (1980). "Slavery in the Malinke Kingdom of Kabadougou (Ivory Coast)". The International Journal of African Historical Studies. 13 (4): 633–650. doi:10.2307/218199. ISSN 0361-7882. JSTOR 218199.
- O'Sullivan, John M. (1983). "The French Conquest of Northwest Ivory Coast: The Attempt of the Rulers of Kabadugu to Control the Situation (La conquête française dans le nord-ouest de la Côte d'Ivoire. Tentatives des chefs de Kabadugu pour tirer parti de la situation)". Cahiers d'Études Africaines. 23 (89/90): 121–138. doi:10.3406/cea.1983.2259. ISSN 0008-0055. JSTOR 4391843.
- Sykes, Tom (2016). Ivory Coast : the Bradt travel guide (First ed.). Chalfont St Peter, Bucks, England. ISBN 9781784770044.
