= Samori Ture =

African warlord and religious leader (1828 – 1900)

- Almamy, Faama
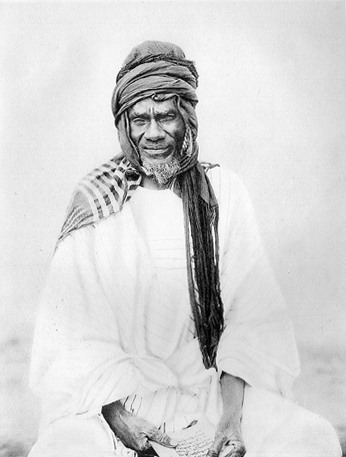

Samoridugula Faama
- Reign: 1878–1898
- Predecessor: position established
- Successor: position abolished
- Born: c. 1830; Manyambaladugu
- Died: June 2, 1900 (aged 71–72); Missanga Island, French Congo (today near Ndjolé, Gabon)
- Issue: At least 1 son
- Religion: Sunni Islam

Samori Ture (c. 1830 – June 2, 1900), also known as Samori Toure, Samory Touré, or Almamy Samore Lafiya Toure, was a Malinke Muslim cleric, military strategist, and founder of an empire that stretched across present-day north and eastern Guinea, north-eastern Sierra Leone, southern Mali, northern Côte d'Ivoire and part of southern Burkina Faso.

A deeply religious Muslim of the Maliki school of religious jurisprudence of Sunni Islam, he organized his empire and justified its expansion with Islamic principles. Ture resisted French colonial rule in West Africa from 1882 until his capture in 1898.

He was the great-grandfather of Guinea's first president, Ahmed Sékou Touré.

== Early life and career ==
Samori Ture was born c. 1830 in Manyambaladugu, the son of Kemo Lanfia Ture, a Dyula weaver and merchant, and Sokhona Camara. The family moved to Sanankoro soon after his birth.

Ture grew up as West Africa was being transformed through growing contacts and trade with the Europeans in commodities, artisan goods and products. European trade made some African trading states rich. The trade in firearms changed traditional West African patterns of warfare and heightened the severity of conflicts, increasing the number of fatalities.

Ture was a troublesome youth, leading a group of local boys who would steal fruit from fields. To put him on a better path, his father bought him some merchandise and sent him off to become a merchant trading kola nuts from the coast for cloth.

In 1853 Sanankoro was raided by the Cissé clan and Samory's mother was captured by the prince Sere Brahima, whose older brother Sere Bourlaye was king in Madina. He went to Madina to exchange himself for his mother, and served seven years as a warrior for the Cissé. In their service he learned to handle firearms, the arts of war, and discipline, and converted to Islam. Brave and intelligent, he moved quickly up the ranks. Sere Bourlaye died in 1859. Soon afterwards Sere Brahima, who succeeded him, freed Samory and his mother, and they returned to Sanankoro. According to tradition, he remained "seven years, seven months, seven days" before leaving with his mother.

== Rise to power ==
At the time, the Manding region had many war bands that were indistinguishable from bandits. Unable to settle into a peaceful life, Samory joined one of these groups but, with his reputation as a warrior, came into conflict with the incumbent leader. After being whipped for insubordination, he left for another band of which he soon took control. His force would set up outside villages, feeding themselves by extorting passing peasants until the village accepted Samory's authority, then they moved on. Their first serious obstacle was the fortified village of Tere, defended by Sere Brema's governor in the region. Samory failed both to capture it and to bribe the governor, Dianka, into switching sides. Still, he managed to capture all of the Toron region either by force or diplomacy, building alliances with the powerful Konate family of Gbodou and the leaders of Bissandougou, and taking the village of Faranfina by a ruse. This first expansionist phase, lasting from 1866 to 1873, saw Samory's army and influence grow dramatically as members of his mother's Camara clan and numerous other volunteers were attracted by his success.

=== Battle of Saman-saman ===
Samory's 1873 capture of Bissandougou represented a declaration of war against Nantenin Famoudou Kourouma, pagan king of Saboudou, who kept his capital at Worokoro. Samori was beaten in their first battle and fell back into the heart of his lands. The night before battle beneath the walls of Bissandougou, Samory went to negotiate with Jamoro Adjigbe Diakite, one of Kourouma's most powerful lieutenants. "I believe that you are wrong to fight against your brother Muslim," he said. "You are Fula and the Fula are Muslim, and I am Ture and the Ture clan are Manden-Mori (Muslim of Mande), and one Muslim can't fight against his brother Muslim. I brought you a few cola for you to stop this war." With that, he gave Diakite a large bribe to switch sides.

The next morning, Diakite's troops fired on Samory's without having loaded bullets into their guns, then turned and helped rout Kourouma, who was captured and beheaded. Samory was now Faama of all the land between the Milo, the Sankarani, and Dion rivers.

=== Theocratic alliance with Bate ===
After his victory in the battle of Saman-saman, in 1875 the Bate Empire, a theocratic state ruled by the Kaba dynasty of Kankan, sent commissioners to Ture in Bissandougou. Karamo Mori Kaba asked for an alliance against his pagan neighbors, particularly the Condé clan based in Gbérédou. This Samory accepted, sealing the pact with a meeting at Tintioule. As part of this holy alliance, Samory deepened his knowledge of Islam studying with a Mauritanian teacher named Sidiki Cherif.

After clearing the immediate environs of Kankan, Samory and the Kaba launched a successful 10-month siege of Koumban upstream of Kankan on the left bank of the Milo. He won over Gbérédou-Baranama and Jadaba Conde (likely an ancestor of Alpha Condé) of Baro. Rather than facing down the important center of Kouroussa he marched down the banks of the Niger river, conquering or negotiating with various chiefs. The final step was the city of Norassoba, which fell after a 9 month siege and joined the Samory's alliance. With this victory, Kouroussa's chief Karinkan-Oulen Doumbouya was left with no allies and agreed to submit, with Samory confirming him in his position. He continued on to the capital of Joma (Dioma), Dielibakoro; one of Ture's griots was from there, managed to negotiate their peaceful submission. After the treaty of Dielibakoro Samory looked to the gold fields of Buré, annexing Fodekaria (Balimana), then crossing the Milo river and where many of the local chiefs joined the alliance. He subdued the Wassoulou region, which would eventually give its name to his entire empire despite the fact that it was rather peripheral to it. During this series of campaigns he arrested and beheaded Jamoro Adjigbe Diakite for conspiring with the enemy.

To protect his arms caravans, Samory formed a non-aggression pact with Aguibou Tall of Dinguiraye in 1878, then an alliance with the almamy of the Imamate of Futa Jallon Ibrahima Sory Dara in 1879. He sent the remains of the son of El Hadj Oumarou Tall, Seydou, who had died at Norasoba, to Dinguiraye for burial. By this point, he was importing breech-loading rifles via the port of Freetown in the British colony of Sierra Leone. He opened regular contacts with the colonial administration there. By 1878 he was strong enough to proclaim himself Faama (military leader) of his Wassoulou Empire.

=== War against the Cissé ===
While Samory had been conquering in the north of his empire in the years 1875-8, Sere Brema Cissé's nephew Morlaye had pushed into the Sankaran region, exploiting Samory's relative lack of influence there but attacking some of his allies. The situation now reached a head, and diplomatic outreach came to nothing.

While marching to confront Morlaye, Samory passed through Kankan and asked the Kaba to contribute troops. With the Cissés being fellow Muslims as well as relative by marriage, and feeling sidelined in the alliance, they refused, breaking the accord of Tintioule. Samory left his brother Keme Brema to besiege Kankan while he marched to face the Cissé. He captured Morlaye at Sirinkoro, and then defeated the army sent to rescue him. Soon he had trapped Sere Brema in Worokoro, which soon fell.

Meanwhile, an effort to relieve the siege of Kankan led by the Sakhos of Koundian and the Coulibalis of Keniera who had also revolted against Samory failed and the city was captured. Daye Kaba, who commanded the garrison of the suburb of Karfamoria, managed to escape to Keniera and later to Segou, where he took refuge with Ahmadu Tall. His family was removed from power in Kankan, whose inhabitants were spared a sack but forced to pay a large indemnity in gold. With this great trading center secure, the Wassoulou Empire extended through the territory of present-day Guinea and southern Mali, from what is now Sierra Leone to northern Côte d'Ivoire.

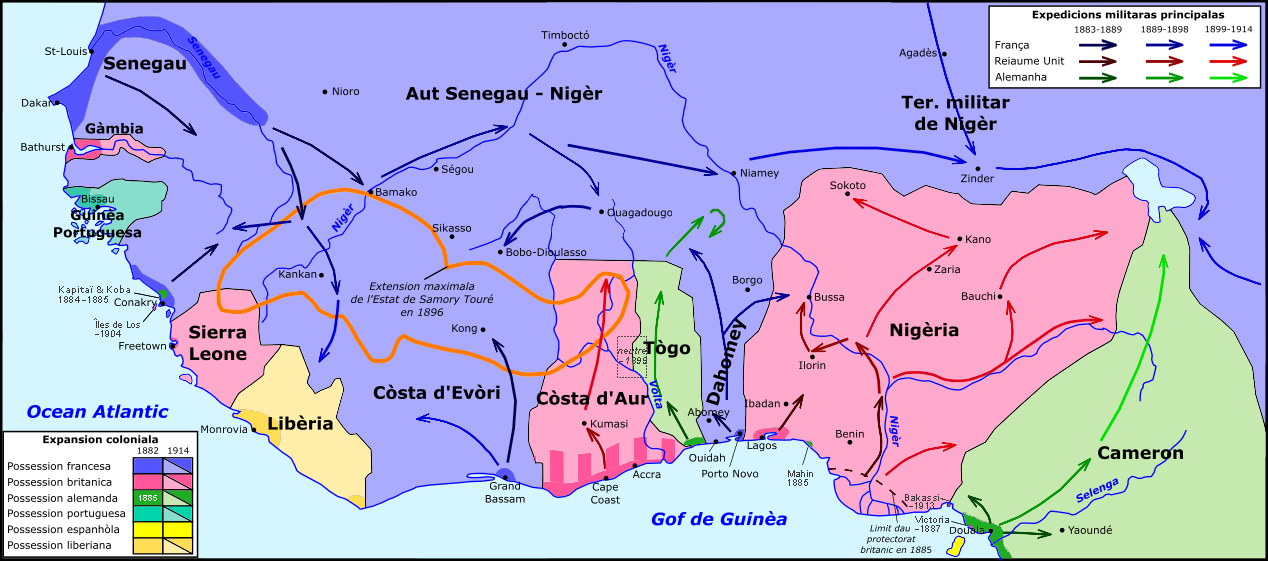
Samori Ture's empire in West Africa, c. 1896

== First battles with the French ==
The French began to expand into the heart of West Africa in the late 1870s, pushing eastward from Senegal to ultimately reach the upper reaches of the Nile in what is now Sudan. Their drive south-east to link up with their bases in Côte d'Ivoire put them directly in conflict with Samori Ture.

After fleeing his native Kankan, Daye Kaba had made contact with the French, who had a garrison at Kita in present-day Mali. The commander Gustave Borgnis-Desbordes sent an envoy to Samori Ture to announce that Kiniéran, where Kaba was sheltering, was now a French protectorate. Unimpressed, Ture sacked the town on February 21, 1882. A French relief column arrived too late, but pursued the Wassoulou army, which turned and fought at Samaya on the 26th. The sofas traditional frontal charges became a slaughter when faced with the latest French weaponry, but Samory quickly pivoted by adopting effective guerilla tactics and hit-and-run cavalry attacks. They harassed the French back to the Niger. This victory won Ture a reputation as the African leader who could stand up to the invading toubab, massively boosting his prestige and recruitment, as well as providing a blueprint for future engagements.

In the aftermath of Samaya, some of the leaders of Bamako began making overtures to Ture. The French, eager to possess this key strategic town on the Niger, rushed a force to establish a fort there on February 1, 1883. Kebe Brema, Samori's brother, led a force to Bamako to lure the French out of their defenses. They fought two battles at Woyo Wayanko creek in early April, with Kebe Brema winning the first but eventually being forced to retreat.

In January 1885 Ture sent an embassy to Freetown, offering to put his kingdom under British protection. While the British did not want to risk angering the French, they allowed Ture to buy large numbers of modern repeating rifles.

When an 1885 French expedition under Col. A. V. A. Combes attempted to seize the Buré gold fields by capturing Niagassola, Ture counter-attacked. Dividing his army into three mobile columns, he worked his way around the French lines of communication and quickly forced them to withdraw. Already embroiled in conflict with Mahmadu Lamine and the Toucouleur Empire, the French were compelled to negotiate the Treaty of Kenieba Koura, signed on March 28, 1886. This pact recognized French hegemony over the left bank of the Niger as far upstream as Siguiri, and Samory's control of Bure and the Manding region. As part of the agreement, Samory's eldest son and heir Djaoulen-Karamo was sent on a diplomatic/fact finding/goodwill mission to France.

== War with Kenedougou ==
While Samori had been nominally fighting for Islam since the alliance with the Imamate of Fula Djallon in 1879, in July 1884 he convened a council to officially proclaim Islam as the state religion, crack down on animist practices, and formally take the title of Almamy. At roughly the same time, the frontier on the Bagoe river between Samori's lands and the Kenedougou Kingdom was descending into violence as forces from both sides raided into the other, and Tieba Traore's army sought to spark a rebellion in the Wassoulou region. With famine and instability widespread, when Samori's forces started forcing conversion to Islam and destroying local sacred sites in 1885, the populace rebelled. Rebels massacred sofa garrisons at Siondougou and Fulala. Samori sent Keme Brema to deal with the situation, and he brutally put down the rebellion. By the end of the 1887 dry season, the last holdouts had been starved into submission.

As the Wassoulou region came back under his control, Samori looked to shore up his northern flank. On March 23, 1887, he signed the treaty of Bissandougou with the French. The terms were similar to the treaty signed the year before, although Samori did accept a French protectorate that he saw as unenforceable, as the colonial army was engaged in a campaign to take Segou. With the French now supposed allies, he turned his full force against Kenedougou, beginning a siege of their capital Sikasso in April that would last 15 months.

During this period the army was well equipped with modern firearms and boasted a complex structure of permanent units. It was divided into an infantry wing of sofa and a cavalry wing. In 1887 Samori could field 30,000 to 35,000 infantry and about 3,000 cavalry, in regular squadrons of 50 each. There was also a reserve, one out of every ten men from every village, such that each of the empire's 10 provinces could furnish 10,000 men. The elite troops were equipped with the Gras rifle, which local blacksmiths had learned to repair and even build from scratch, but not in the quantities necessary to supply the entire army.

The siege marked the high water mark of Tore's power and the beginning of his decline. The Tata of Sikasso was one of the most well-developed defensive systems in West Africa at the time, and Samori had no artillery. His supply lines relied on porters to bring food and ammunition from Bissandougou through still-hostile Bambara territory. Roads became quagmires during the rainy season, and dysentery struck the army, devastating the men and killing Kebe Brema among other important leaders. Meanwhile, the French, far from acting as allies, had built a fort at Siguiri and were blocking all trade with the Sahel or Senegal. As the siege dragged on, anyone living near the road to Bissandougou was forced into service as porters or had their food appropriated by the soldiers. When a rumor began that Samori himself was dead, another massive rebellion broke out. By the end of the 1888 rainy season, he was forced to abandon the siege. His starving, desperate troops again brutally sacked Wassoulou, massacring any rebels they found.

== Fall of Kankan and Bissandougou ==
In February 1889 Samory and the French signed yet another treaty, this time at Niako, that pushed colonial control further south. The Almamy was in a relatively weak position after the debacle at Sikasso, and the French were still focused on Segou. They soon broke some of the verbal promises that had been made at Niako relative to the return of fugitives and rebels. In another blow, the British had stopped selling breechloading guns in accordance with the Brussels Conference Act of 1890.

On March 10, 1891, a French force under Colonel Louis Archinard set out from Nyamina for a surprise attack on Kankan, rendering all the previous treaties moot. He expected to subdue Samory in a few weeks with a lightning campaign. Knowing his fortifications could not stop French artillery, Ture began a war of manoeuvre and scorched earth. Despite victories against isolated French columns (for example at Dabadugu in September 1891), he failed to push the French from the core of his kingdom. Archinard had little trouble capturing Kankan on April 11 and then a deserted Bissandougou, but Ture had left little worth taking. They set up a garrison in Kankan, where they reinstalled Daye Kaba as a puppet ruler.

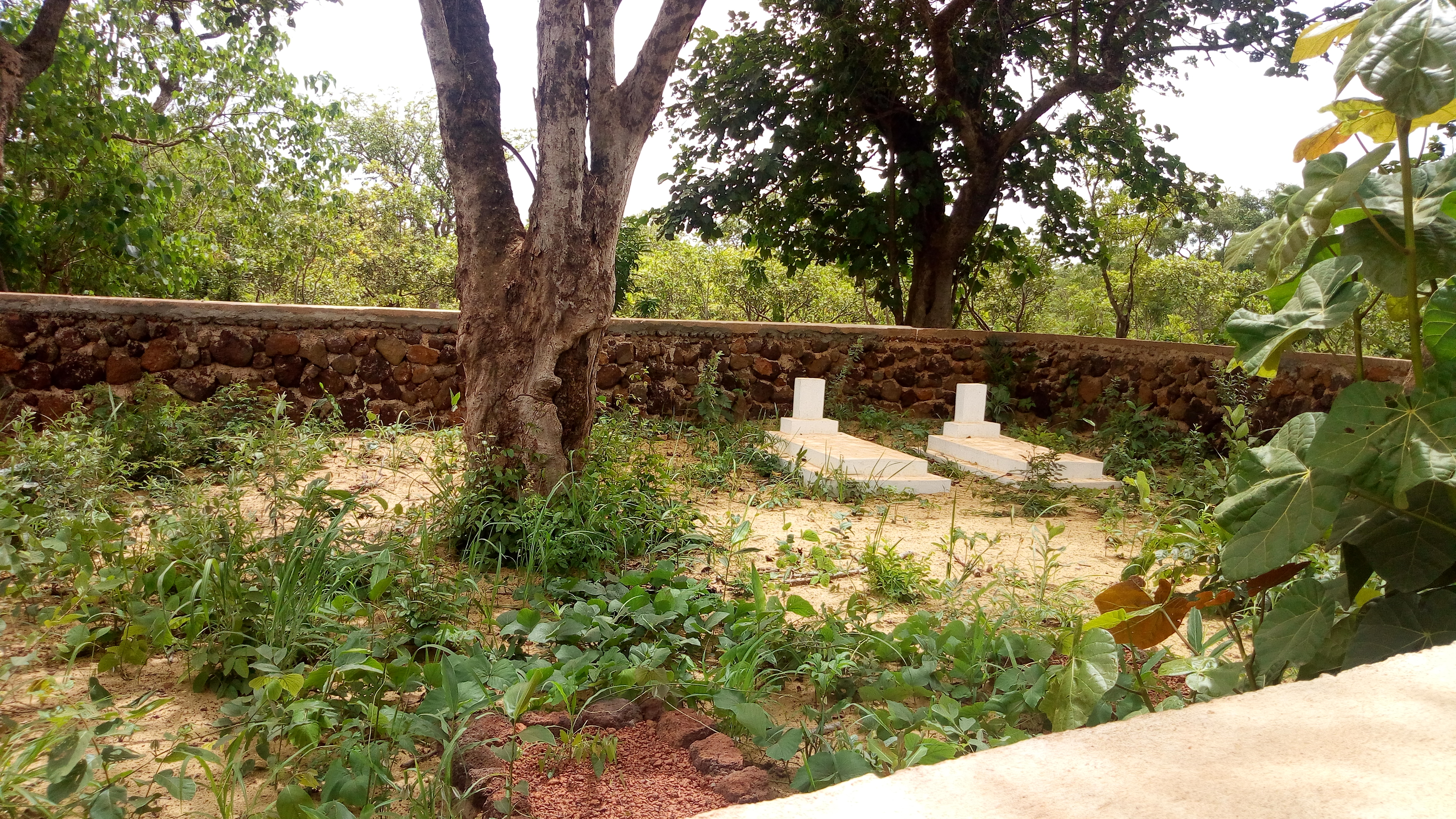
The grave of French soldiers who fell during the battle of Bissandugu

Samori organized a great assembly in August 1891 in Missamaghana, inviting his son in law Mangbe-Amadou Ture of the Kabadougou Kingdom, also called Kabassarana. The empire was put on a war footing, collecting metal to melt into bullets, stocking granaries, recruiting soldiers etc. While the best-armed troops resisted the French using French-made repeater rifles, those armed with the bolt-action chassepot conquered new territory to the east to use as a strategic reserve, and men with flintlocks served as the home guard or internal security. With this system, Samory could fall back into territory already conquered and organized, leaving no food for the French, for the next seven years.

Archinard's replacement Col. Pierre Humbert arrived in Kankan in January 1892 and led a small, well-supplied force of picked men on an attack on Bissandougou. The sofas fought defensive battles at the Soumbe and Diamanko creeks the 11th and 12th, taking heavy casualties but doing serious damage to the French and nearly capturing the enemy artillery, but could not save the once-again abandoned city. The French kept chasing Samori's army south, facing ambushes, guerilla warfare, and scorched earth the whole way, installing garrisons at Bissandougou and Kerouane. At another council at Frankonedou on May 9, 1892, Samory and his allies decided to rebase the empire in Kabadougou, devastating each area before evacuating it to delay French pursuit.

During the first months of 1893 the French, although unable to corner Ture armies in Guinea, did manage to capture Faranah and block resupply routes to Liberia and Sierra Leone, Wassoulou's primary source of modern weaponry. This left Samory reliant on a longer route through the Gold Coast. The Wassoulou vassals in Kissidougou and the rest of the western- and southernmost parts of the empire surrendered, and the French looked to rebuild profitable colonies in the wartorn lands rather than push further. Samory Ture's empire in the Manding region was now gone, but he still commanded some 12000 infantry, 2000 cavalry, and had a moving retinue of some 120,000 people as he pushed east.

== The Second Wassoulou Empire ==
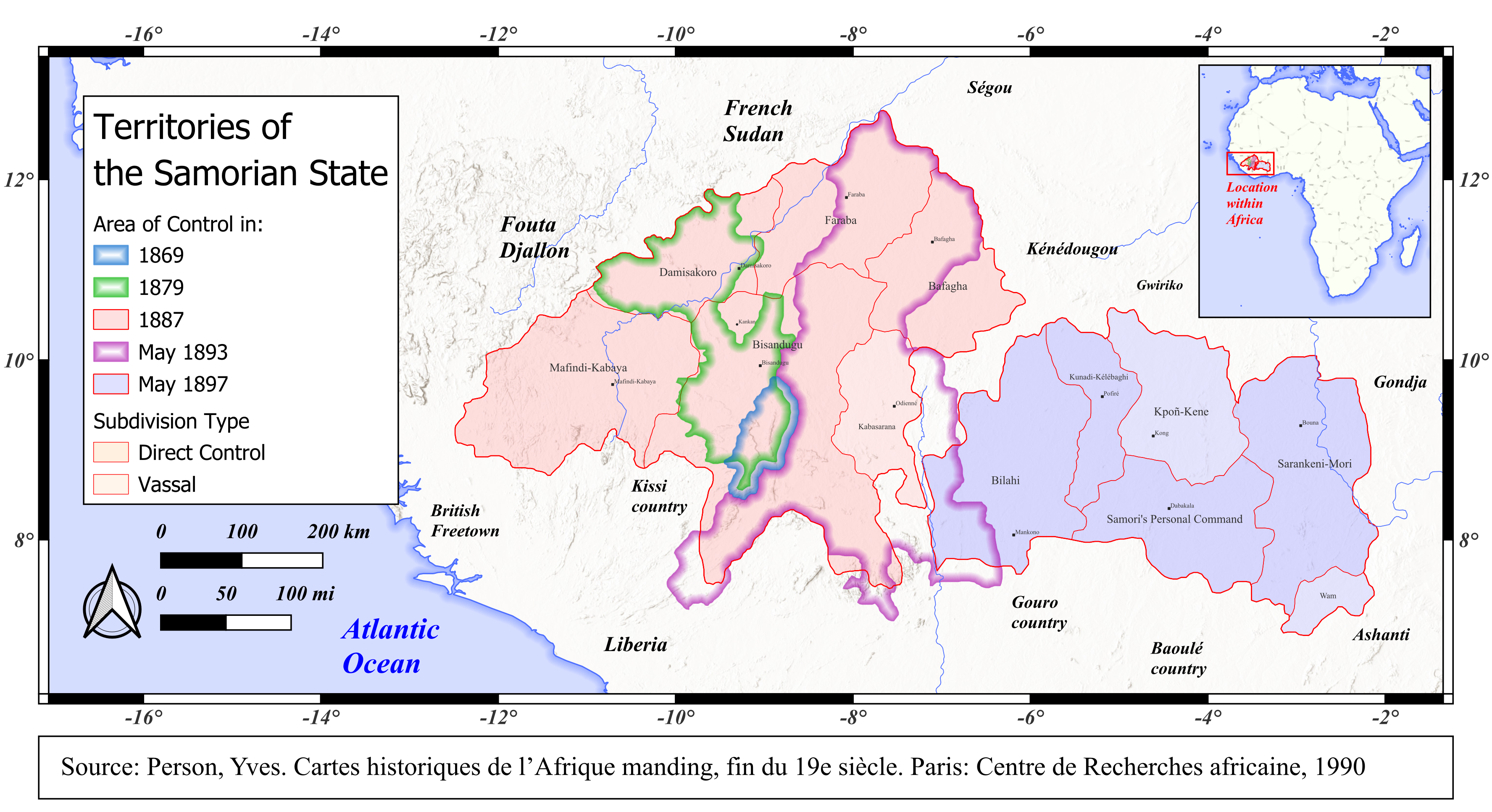
The territorial evolution of Samori Ture's Empire

=== Capture of Kong ===
Encouraged by Babemba Traore, who had succeeded his brother Tieba as faama of Kenedougou, the Bambara country again rose in revolt in 1894, blocking Samory's access to Sahelian horses. He moved his base out of Kabadougou toward the Bandama and Comoe River to Dabakala in February 1895. Along the way, he met with representatives of Gbon Coulibaly to negotiate the entry of Korhogo into the empire.

His objective, and the key to the whole region, was the ancient Dyula trading city of Kong. The city had nominally accepted French protection during Louis-Gustave Binger's visit in 1892, and the colonial leaders sought to formalize this relationship by putting together a column led by Col. Monteil in August 1894. The force did not leave Grand Bassam, however, until February 1895, and its arrival sparked a popular resistance movement. Monteil stumbled onto the sofas on March 2, to the surprise of both sides; in a battle on the 14th, the French were forced to retreat and abandon Kong, which pledged fealty to Samory in April. He would enjoy nearly two years to consolidate his new empire without significant French intervention.

=== Consolidating control ===
Samory's sofa forces has been depleted by war and the wholesale migration east. His defeat of Babemba Traore at Kaloua in September 1894, however, boosted his prestige among the Senufo people, many of whom joined the army. He also tried to build an anti-European alliance with the Ashanti Empire, but this attempt failed when they were defeated by the British.

Ture accorded the city of Kong numerous privileges, but the local Dyula merchants' commerce with the coast, dominated by the French, had slowed since their absorption into the Wassoulou empire. When Samory, looking to push further east into the Gold Coast to secure new sources of guns, retreated rather than fight a French force, they sought to take advantage of his weakness by intercepting arms caravans and opening channels to invite the French back. When the discontent eventually broke into open revolt, Samory destroyed the city on May 23, 1897.

The force that the sofas had encountered was part of France's efforts to control Bouna while keeping Samory and the British apart. Capt. Paul Braulot came south from the Niger bend to attempt to negotiate another protectorate but was rebuffed, as Ture wanted only to live apart from the French. In April 1897, British Governor William Edward Maxwell of the Gold Coast tried to intimidate Saranken Mori, Samory's son and the commander in the region, into abandoning Bouna. When this failed, a force of the Southern Nigeria Regiment under Henderson marched on the town but were defeated at Dokita, then later routed and Henderson was captured at Wa.

Knowing this setback would prompt an aggressive British response, the French again sent Braulot, at the head of an armed column, to try to acquire Bouna by negotiation. Saranken Mori initially accepted. But when Braulot arrived at Bouna, he was killed and his column destroyed outside the city on August 20, 1897, restarting the war between the French and Samory Ture.

=== Last stand ===
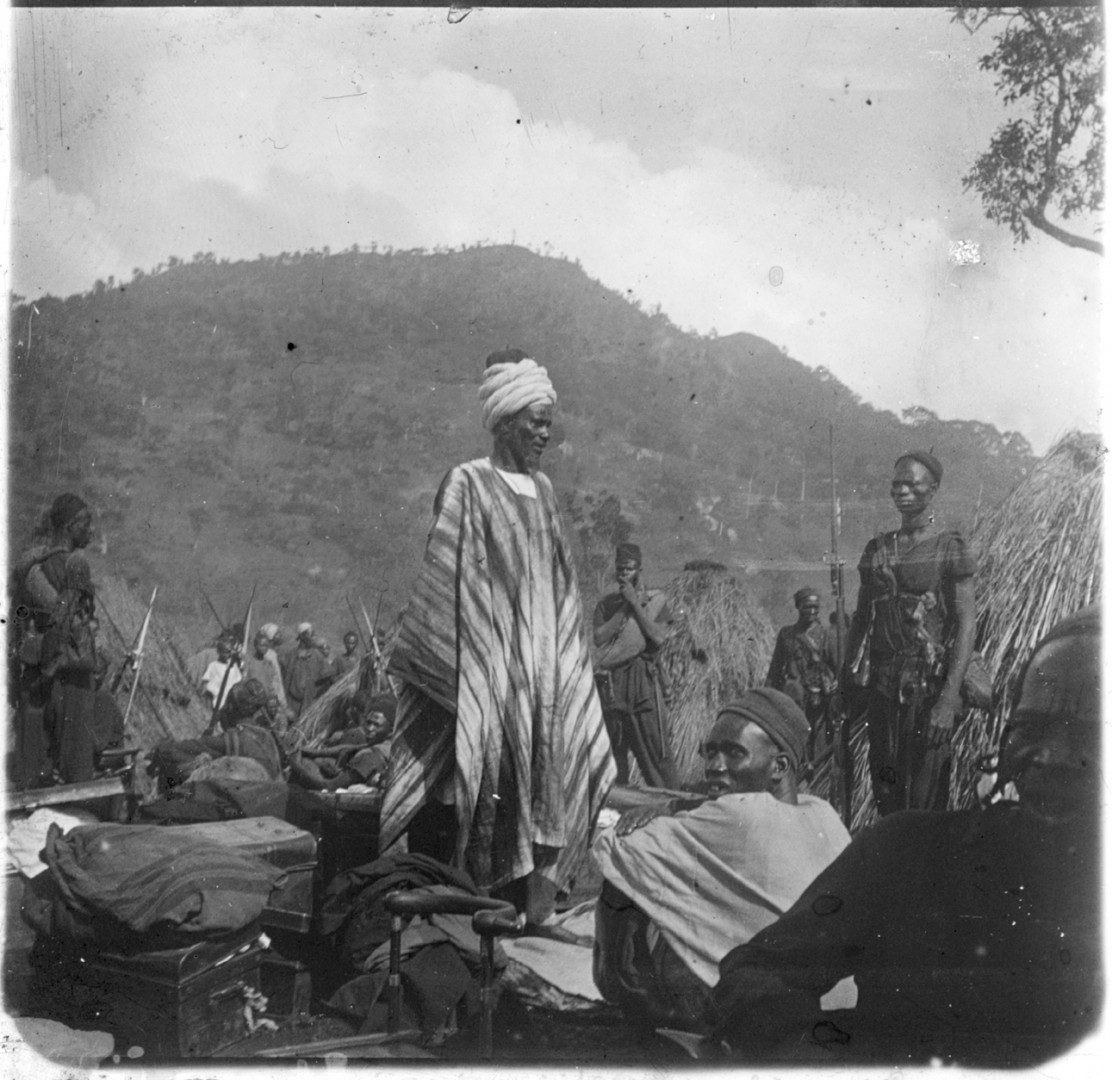
Samori Ture after being captured, 29 September 1898

The fall of the Kenedougou capital of Sikasso on May 1, 1898, permitted French colonial forces to launch a concentrated assault against Ture. He soon was forced to migrate once again, this time towards Liberia. Hoping to live off the land while marching, a combination of the unfamiliar mountainous territory of western Ivory Coast, hostile locals, and colonial attacks turned the campaign into a disaster. Thousands died of starvation. Using information from sofa deserters, the French captain Henri Gouraud surprised Ture's forces at Guelemou on September 29, 1898, and captured the Almamy without a fight.

== Exile and death ==
Samori Ture was brought to Kayes, and on December 22, 1898, was condemned to exile, despite his wish to return to southern Guinea. His wife Saranken Konate, who had often ruled as regent during his absences from Bissandougou, refused to accompany him. Emotionally devastated, he was taken to Saint-Louis, Senegal on January 4, 1899. He attempted suicide the night before he was scheduled to be deported to Gabon but survived and finally embarked on February 5.

The prison camp where Samori Ture spent his last years, the small island of Missanga in the middle of the Ogooué River near Ndjolé, was known as the 'dry guillotine' due to the death rate among prisoners. He died there of pneumonia on June 2, 1900, at 4:45 pm.

== Legacy ==
In the first decades of colonial domination in southern Mali and northeastern Guinea, the French framed their conquest as having delivered the locals from the violence and insecurity of the Samory years, and therefore that the communities owed their lives and allegiance to them. During the interwar period, however, African intellectuals began to rehabilitate Ture's memory. He became a hero and rallying cry for anti-colonial parties in Guinea and Mali, but was also used by their opponents. Since independence, Samori Ture has been generally remembered as a hero and martyr of African resistance to European colonialism. In some communities in southern Mali that suffered brutal repression under his rule, however, he is remembered as a tyrant.

Samory's great-grandson, Ahmed Sékou Touré, was elected as the first President of Guinea after it became independent. Today, his tomb is at the Camayanne Mausoleum, within the gardens of Conakry Grand Mosque.

== In popular culture ==
- Massa Makan Diabaté's play Une hyène à jeun (A Hyena with an Empty Stomach, 1988) dramatizes Samori Ture's signing of the 1886 Treaty of Kéniéba-Koura, which granted the left bank of the Niger to France.
- Guinean band Bembeya Jazz National commemorated Ture in their 1969 release Regard sur le passé. The album draws upon Manding Djeli traditions and consists of two recordings that recount Ture's anti-colonial resistance and nation-building.
- Author Ta-Nehisi Coates references Ture in his book Between the World and Me when explaining to his son where his name Samori came from.
- Ivorien reggae superstar Alpha Blondy eulogises Ture in his hit song "Bory Samory" from the Album Cocody Rock.
- Italian band Classica Orchestra Afrobeat directed by Marco Zanotti produced Regard sur le Passe in 2014, which is a 3 act musical suite which tells the epic story of Ture with two on-stage griots – Sekouba Bambino and Baba Sissoko.

== Sources ==
- Ajayi, J.F. Ade, ed. (1989). UNESCO General History of Africa. Vol. VI: Africa in the Nineteenth Century until the 1880s. Berkeley: University of California Press. ISBN 978-92-3-101712-4.
- Asante, Molefi Kete, The History of Africa: The Quest for Eternal Harmony (New York: Routledge, 2007).
- Boahen, A. Adu, ed. UNESCO General History of Africa, Vol. VII: Africa Under Colonial Domination, 1880–1935 (Berkeley: University of California Press, 1985).
- Boahen, A. Adu (1989). African Perspective on Colonialism. Baltimore: Johns Hopkins University Press. p. 144 pages. ISBN 0-8018-3931-9.
- Boahen, A. Adu (1990). Africa Under Colonial Domination, 1880-1935. Berkeley: University of California Press. p. 357 pages. ISBN 0-520-06702-9.
- Gann, L. H., and Peter Duigan, eds. Colonialism in Africa, 1870–1960, Vol. 1: The History and Politics of Colonialism 1870–1914 (Cambridge, UK: Cambridge University Press, 1969).
- Ogot, Bethwell A. (1992). Africa from the Sixteenth to the Eighteenth Century. California: University of California Press. p. 1076 pages. ISBN 0-520-03916-5.
- Oliver, Roland, and G. N. Sanderson, eds. The Cambridge History of Africa, Vol. 6: from 1870–1905 (Cambridge, UK: Cambridge University Press, 1985).
- Person, Yves (1968–1975). Samori, Une révolution Dyula. Vol. 3 volumes. Dakar: IFAN. p. 2377 pages. A fourth volume of maps published in Paris in 1990. Monumental work of history perhaps unique in African literature.
- Piłaszewicz, Stanisław. 1991. On the Veracity of Oral Tradition as a Historical Source: – the Case of Samori Ture. In Unwritten Testimonies of the African Past. Proceedings of the International Symposium held in Ojrzanów n. Warsaw on 07-08 November 1989 ed. by S. Piłaszewicz and E. Rzewuski, (Orientalia Varsoviensia 2). Warsaw: Wydawnictwa Uniwersytetu Warszawskiego.
