= Lanciné =

Lanciné is a given name. Notable people with the name include:

- Lanciné Diabi (born 1956), Ivorian filmmaker
- Lancine Fofana (born 1966), Ivorian sprinter
- Lanciné Koné (born 1979), Ivorian footballer
- Lancine Touré (born 1995), Ivorian footballer

== See also ==
- Fadika Kramo-Lanciné (1948-2022), Ivorian film director
