= Aguibou Tall =

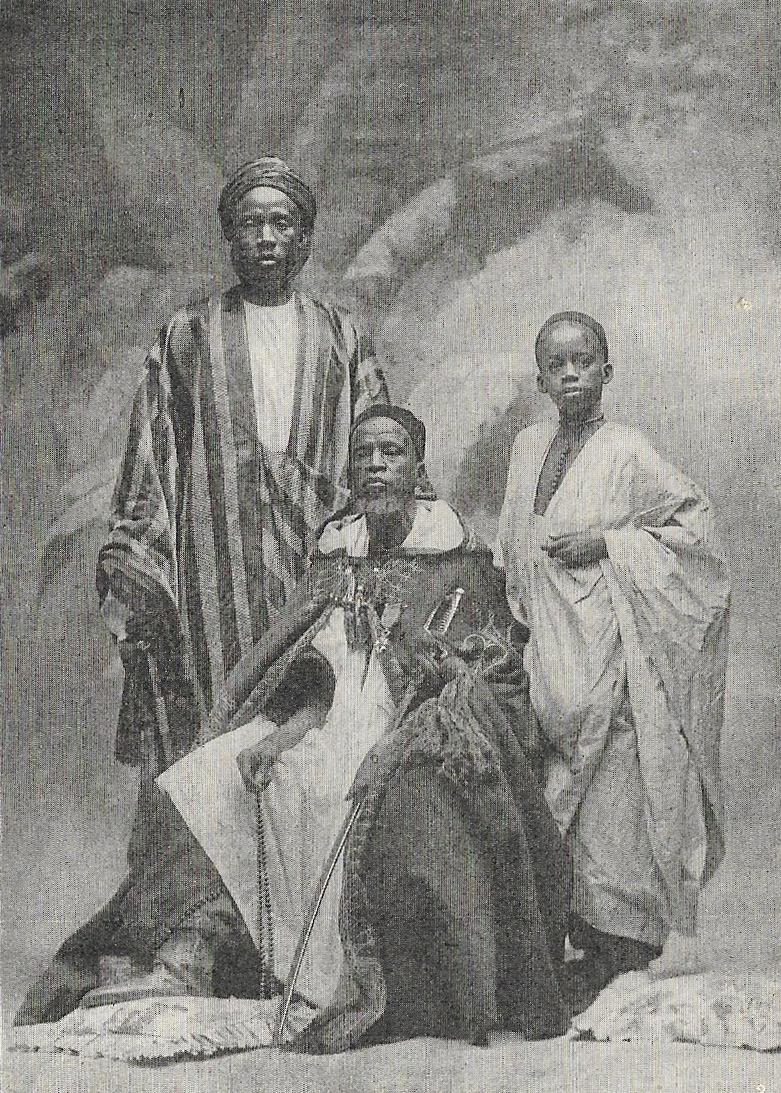
- Aguibou Tall with his son and a servant

Faama of Dinguiraye
- Reign: 1878-1892
- Predecessor: Saidou
- Successor: Makki

Sultan of Massina
- Reign: 1892-1903
- Appointed by Louis Archinard: 4 may 1893
- Predecessor: Ahmadu Tall
- Successor: position abolished

Chief of the Futanke community of Bandiagara
- Reign: 1903-1908
- Born: 1843? Diegounko
- Died: 1907; Bandiagara
- Father: El Hajj Oumar Tall
- Mother: Mariatu
- Religion: Islam

Aguibou Tall, son of Cheikh Oumar Tall, was the Faama of Dinguiraye and Massina in the late 19th and early 20th centuries. Initially a lieutenant of his older brother Ahmadu Tall, he betrayed the Toucouleur Empire to ally with the French. He remained in power after the French colonial conquest due to an alliance forged with general Louis Archinard.

== Early life ==
Aguibou Tall was born in either 1839 or 1842-3 to Omar Saidou Tall and his wife Mariatu, daughter of the Mai of Bornu. His father was at the time a prominent but not particularly important marabout living in the Futa Jallon. Aguibou was his ninth son.

After his father's death in 1864, Aguibou served his older half-brother Ahmadu Tall. From 1869-73 he was regent in Segou while Ahmadu was crushing a rebellion by other half-brothers in Nioro. Habibou Tall, who had been left in charge of Dinguiraye, the first capital of the Toucouleur Empire, when Omar Tall set out to launch the jihad, joined this rebellion, and was captured and imprisoned. Meanwhile, Aguibou's generosity and good government made him popular in Segou, and so Ahmadu saw him as a potential rival for rule. When Saidou, the new governor of Dinguiraye, was killed in battle in 1876, Aguibou's supporters started lobbying for him to be named to the position. After hesitating, Ahmadu agreed. Aguibou left Segou on November 2nd 1878, but Ahmadu kept some of his wives in Segou as guarantee of good conduct. Aguibou never forgot this slight.

== Dinguiraye ==
Aguibou took up his new office in early 1879. Dinguiraye was isolated from the heartland of the Toucouleur Empire and, despite peaceful links established, was threatened by the rising power of Samory Toure.

So in 1884, Aguibou first reached out to the French for military protection. Nothing came of this first attempt. In early 1887, however, the new Commandant Joseph Gallieni sent an emissary, and Aguibou signed a protectorate treaty on March 12th.

Relations between Aguibou and the French cooled significantly the next year, when Gallieni was replaced by the less diplomatic Louis Archinard. He wanted a military victory to improve his chances of promotion, and so seized the Toucouleur fortress at Koundian in February 1889. Aguibou reached out to Samory, and raided the region around the new French post at Siguiri. Soon, however, a new round of threats and luxurious gifts brought him back into the French fold. In May 1891, Dinguiraye was annexed directly, with a French garrison posted there; Aguibou was forced to accept this, as the French were his only protection against Samory.

== Bandiagara ==
In 1892, Aguibou was summoned to Kayes by Louis Archinard, and accompanied him on his conquest of Djenne and Bandiagara. Despite his hopes to succeed Ahmadu in Nioro, he was named faama of Macina on May 4th 1893, but had very little real power.

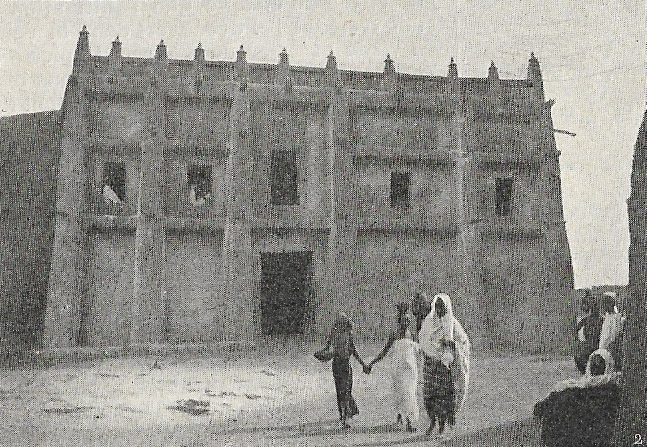
Aguibou Tall's palace in Bandiagara

Aguibou was unpopular among many of the locals, who were either partisans of Ahmadu or Dogon who resented Toucouleur hegemony in all its forms. Many of his relatives considered him a traitor to the jihadist cause. Without a power base of his own, he remained completely dependent on the French, and was richly rewarded for his service.

In 1900, the French government invited him to Paris along with his son Moktar and his favorite Fatimata, daughter of Boubakar Saada, Almamy of Boundou.

In February 1903 Massina was formally integrated into the French empire, with Aguibou demoted to simply the chief of the local Futanke community.

== Personal life ==
Surviving portraits of Aguibou paint the picture of a complicated man. Many of his contemporaries considered him greedy, cruel, capricious and plaintive, and publicly criticized himself for collaborating with the French. At the same time, he protected many of his family from the French after the fall of Ahmadu's regime. He was not a religious fanatic or natural warrior, though he did have a reputation for personal bravery, and loved comfort and giving and receiving gifts. He was an avid collector of European furniture and other luxuries, which the French provided to him in exchange for his loyalty.

Aguibou was awarded the Legion d'Honneur for his services to France. Upon his death in 1907, he was buried with French military honors.
