= Sofa (warrior) =

Slave soldiers in the army of the Mali Empire

Sofa is a Mandinka term for slave soldiers who served in the army of the Mali Empire. Sofas would also fight, in varying capacities, in the armies of later Mandé states such as the Bamana and Wassoulou empires.

== Etymology ==
The word sofa translates into English as "father of the horse" (so means horse, and fa means "father") or "guardian of the horse". This term stems from the original function of the sofa as a caretaker for the horse or horses of Mandinka cavalry commanders called farari.

Solomana Kanté suggested that the word sofa was derived from so (town) and fa (killer).

== History ==
=== In the Mandinka empire of Mali ===
Sofas make their first appearance in oral and written records during the formation of the Mali Empire. Sofas were recruited from "jonow" (slaves) captured in battle or bought from afar. They could be depended on in most instances for obedience, since their livelihood depended entirely on their master. The institution of slavery in the Mali Empire heavily rewarded loyalty, and jonow could rise to civil or military positions of prominence. Jonow became part of their master's clan, and were often freed after a certain number of years.

As part of the clan, jonow were expected to accompany their masters into battle and handle his horse and weapons. Initially forbidden from engaging in direct warfare, sofa eventually made up the majority of Mali's infantry army. As infantry, they were armed with bows and arrows by the state or, more accurately, royal clans devoted to the state.

In the forest and swampy areas of the Mali Empire, cavalry was minimized or altogether abandoned making sofas the exclusive instrument of war. Sofas were equipped with two quivers, and their bow was small by European standards. It could not fire very far or even powerfully, so sofas utilized deadly poisons and fired in arcs to give the arrows strength. Sofas also used flaming arrows, especially against fortifications that were often little more than thatch or wooden palisades.

Some sofas fought as cavalry, at least after being freed, such as Mansa Sakura whom started out his military career as a jonow of the Keita clan. He was freed by Sundjata Keita, became a cavalry commander of some renown and eventually usurped the throne of Mali.

=== In the Mané empire of Kquoja ===
During the 16th century, warriors from the crumbling Mali Empire invaded what is now Sierra Leone and Liberia. This resulted in the establishment of a loose federation of Mané states all paying homage to a single leader in a type of empire called Kquoja by visiting Europeans. The Mané came equipped with the tactics and equipment of the Mali Empire, but were forced to rely almost exclusively on infantry strategies in the jungle terrain.

One of the many institutions they brought with them was that of the sofa. Conquered people were conscripted into Mané armies as sumbas to strengthen a force that was forever on the move. The sumbas were forced to engage in ritual cannibalism, which permanently alienated them from the Mané ruling class.

By the end of the 17th century, the Mané had conquered nearly all the indigenous cultures. This resulted in the spread of Mandé language and the end of a single Kquoja authority as the Mané were absorbed into the native landscape.

=== In the Bamana empire of Segou ===
The Bamana people inherited much from their close relations, the Mandinka, in civic and military culture. They formed their own empire 1640, which filled the vacuum left by the Mali and Songhai empires. By 1712, the state had crystallized into a formidable state that borrowed much in military structure from the Mali Empire. Sofas were used heavily in its armies as infantry and support troops, which allowed the Bamana to dominate much of modern-day Mali.

=== in the Malinké Kabadougou Kingdom ===
Within the Kabadougou Kingdom, the sofayi were agricultural workers in conjunction to their military service. Their use was widespread, constituting all of the soldiers of the faama.

=== In the Dyula empire of Wassoulou ===
The institution of the sofa survived into the late 19th century among Dyula in the Wassoulou region between the modern states of Mali, Guinea and Ivory Coast. Under the leadership of Samori Ture, the Dyula formed the Wassoulou Empire and successfully challenged French ambitions in West Africa until 1898.

The sofa under Samori were organized into standing armies of slaves, much like those in Mali six centuries earlier and armed by the state. However, instead of bows and arrows, Wassoulou sofas went to war armed with modern rifles, which they put to good use against African and European enemies.

== See also ==
- Mali Empire
- Military history of the Mali Empire
- Kingdom of Kquoja
- Bamana Empire
- Wassoulou Empire
- History of West Africa
