= Wassoulou =

Historical area of West Africa

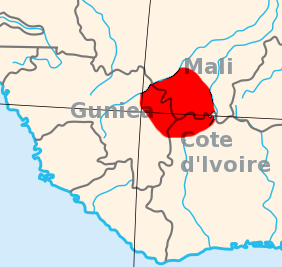
The Wassoulou region of West Africa

Wassoulou, sometimes spelled Wassulu, Wassalou, or Ouassalou, is a cultural area and historical region surrounding the point where the borders of Mali, Ivory Coast, and Guinea meet. Home to about 160,000 people, it is bordered by the Niger River to the northwest, and by the Sankarani River to the east. Inhabitants are known as Wassulu, Wassulunka or Wassulunke.

== History ==
The history of Wassoulou before the 19th century is poorly attested in surviving sources, but it appears to have been a relatively decentralized and egalitarian society composed of jamana, alliances of small villages defended by walls. The region was in some respects tributary to the Segou Empire in the 18th and early 19th centuries, but still suffered regular slave raids.

Wassoulou is also the name of an Islamic state, the Wassoulou Empire (1860–1898), ruled by Samori Ture and centered on his capital, Bissandugu. In 1870, Samori overthrew an older Wassoulou state whose faama (ruler) was Dyanabufarina Modi. He established a hierarchichal government system for the first time, appointing the local Muslim convert Farbalay Jakite as his representative in the region in 1882.

The Wassoulunke rebelled against Toure multiple times. The first was in 1885 in response to the institutionalization of Islam in the empire and the suppression of animist practices. It was brutally put down by Toure's brother Keme Brema. The war between Samory and Kenedougou devastated the region, leaving thousands of refugees who were often sold into slavery or even sold themselves to avoid starving to death. Another rebellion after Samory's failure in the siege of Sikasso was also brutally suppressed. Toure moved through again in 1891, forcibly moving much of the population east with him as he migrated, and massacring the town of N'Tentou when the inhabitants refused to leave. Overall, the Samory Toure years saw the region almost completely depopulated.

Wassoulou continued to suffer instability and social conflict, including predation by colonial troops, well into the period of French domination. As slavery gradually died out in the French Sudan, tens of thousands of freed slaves made their way back to their native Wassoulou in the decades before the First World War.

== Population and culture ==
The Wassoulou area is a center for the mingling of several ethnic groups. The Fulani people, who are believed to have migrated from the Fouta Djallon highlands, integrated with the indigenous Mandé populations, adopting a dialect of the Bambara language and local customs before the 18th century, coinciding with the spread of Islam. The culture of the Wassulunke of Fulbe ancestry is a unique blend of few traditional Fulbe practices and those of the indigenous Mandé peoples.

== Music ==
Wassoulou is the birthplace of Wassoulou music, a style which blends traditional and modern influences with strong female vocalists and a pentatonic hunter's harp. Some of the most famous residents of Wassoulou include the singers Oumou Sangare, Ramata Diakite and Coumba Sidibe.

== See also ==
- Wassoulou music
- Wassoulou Empire
- Sikasso Region
- Manding languages
- Mandinka people
- Fula people

== Sources ==
- Klein, Martin (1999). "ETHNIC PLURALISM AND HOMOGENEITY IN THE WESTERN SUDAN: SAALUM, SEGU, WASULU". Mande Studies. 1.
- Peterson, Brian J. (2008). ""History, Memory and the Legacy of Samori in Southern Mali, C. 1880-1898."". The Journal of African History. 49 (2): 261–79. doi:10.1017/S0021853708003903. JSTOR 40206642. S2CID 155012842.
