= Gustave Borgnis-Desbordes =

French general

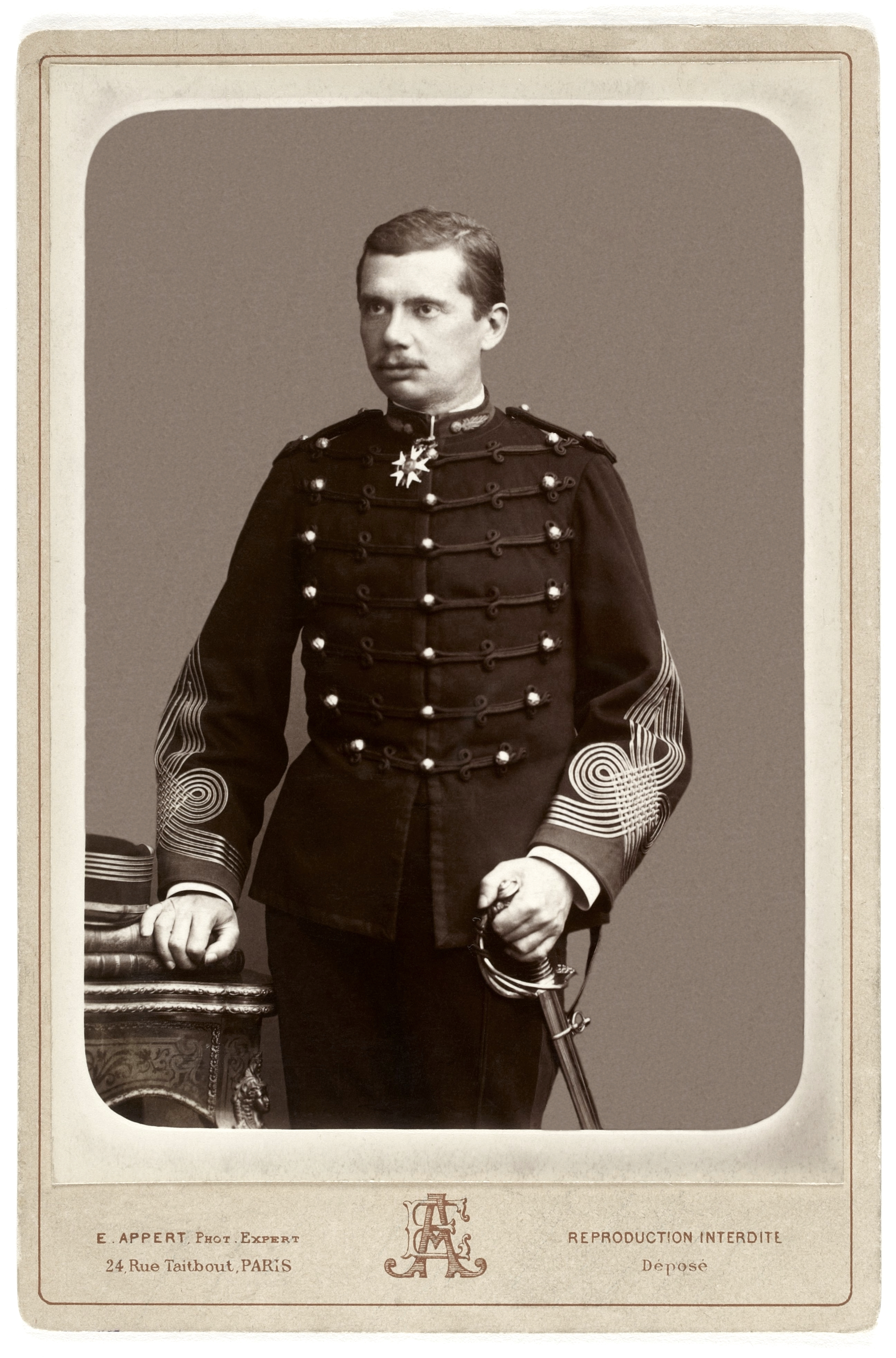
- Colonel Borgnis-Desbordes, photographed in 1886
- Born: 22 October 1839; Provins, France
- Died: 18 July 1900 (aged 60); Hanoi, Vietnam
- Military career
- Allegiance: France
- Branch: French Army
- Rank: Général de division
- Commands: Expeditionary Forces in French Indochina (1885); Commandant-Superior of the French Military Territory of Haut-Sénégal (1880–1883)
- Conflicts: Sino-French War; Mandingo Wars

Gustave Borgnis-Desbordes (22 October 1839 – 18 July 1900) was a French general. He was a major figure in the French Imperial conquest of the French Sudan, modern Mali. He was Commandant-Superior of the French Military Territory of Haut-Sénégal (French territory of Upper Senegal), attached to the colonial government of Senegal, 1880 to 1883.

== Early career ==
Born into a family from Morlaix, Gustave was the grandson of a Deputy from Finistère, and the son of a military engineer trained at the prestigious Ecole Polytechnique. Gustave also graduated from the Ecole Polytechnique on 18 October 1859, and went on to the Army Artillery School at Metz. He received his first commission to the Troupes de marine transferred to a Marine regiment at the naval base in Toulon, with the rank of Captain. From 16 February 1868 to 1 March 1871, Borgnis-Desbordes was assigned to units fighting in the French colonial campaign in Cochinchine (Vietnam). In 1871, following France's defeat in the Franco-Prussian War, he was made adjutant to General Frébault in Paris. He was made Chef d'escadron in 1875 and promoted to Lieutenant-Colonel.

== Senegal and French Soudan ==
Borgnis-Desbordes is most remembered as a daring and restless commander of the French colonial expansion into the Middle Niger River Valley. He served as a Lieutenant-Colonel under the Governor of Senegal Louis Brière de l'Isle (1876–1881). Between 1880 and 1883 Borgnis-Desbordes was Commandant-Superieur du Haut-Fleuve, Commander of the Military Territory of Haut Senegal, which was later expanded to the east and rechristened French Soudan in 1890. He founded the French forts at Kita (1881) and Bamako (1883), which became two of the key towns of French Soudan. In the process he launched a series of military campaigns against the remnants of the regional power of the Tukulor Empire, which was finally overthrown by Colonel Louis Archinard in 1890.

=== Under the governor of Senegal ===
Under both Brière de l'Isle in Senegal, and as chief officer in the Soudan, Borgnis-Desbordes developed a reputation for violence and insubordination, leading the territorial expansion of French power in the absence of, and sometimes in direct contradiction of the Ministry of Marine, the government arm which controlled colonial forces.

Borgnis-Desbordes led the French conquest of the remnants of the Imamate of Futa Toro, along what is today the northeastern border of Senegal, which Briere de l'Isle ordered in contradiction of government directives. In 1878 Borgnis-Desbordes led a French force against the Kaarta Toucouleur vassal state along the north bank of the Senegal River. Blocked by the colonial minister in Paris, Briere de l'Isle argued that Kaarta was a threat to the new protectorate in Fouta Tooro, and that British agents were infiltrating the area. The Ministry gave in, and on 7 July 1878, Borgnis-Desbordes forces destroyed the Kaarta Toucouleur fort at Sabouciré, killing their leader, Almany Niamody. This portion of the Kaarta vassals were then incorporated into the Khasso Wolof protectorate kingdom.

=== Commander of the first French Soudan colony ===
As Commandant-Superieur du Haut-Fleuve, Borgnis-Desbordes attack on Bamako in 1880 was the trigger for Brière de l'Isle's dismissal, and his attack on Samory Touré's forces in 1883 began a conflict which only ended in 1893.

==== Under Brière de l'Isle: 1881 ====
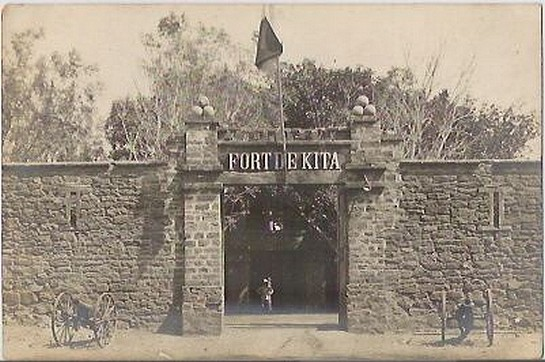
The French fort at Kita (1904). This was the base of Lt. Colonel Borgnis-Desbordes's forces during his time as Commandant-Superieur du Haut-Fleuve.

When Brière de l'Isle appointed Borgnis-Desbordes Commandant-Superieur du Haut-Fleuve on 6 September 1880, he was also given the rank of Lt. Colonel, outranking all other French officials in the area, essentially appointing him a Lieutenant Governor. of all territory to the east of Senegal, beginning at the confluence of the Senegal River and Falémé. Borgnis-Desbordes arrived in Bafoulabé on 1 January 1881, and moved his forces onto Kita on 7 February, where he established his headquarters. From his base in Kita, Borgnis-Desbordes had the authority to conduct all aspects of French policy in the Soudan, including exploration, railway construction and defense.

With a battalion of Tirailleurs sénégalais at his command, Borgnis-Desbordes set about the work of establishing bases all along the proposed Dakar-Niger Railway, bringing African states under French rule, and scouting for a rail terminus on the Niger River.

In 1881, within two weeks of receiving the order to halt at Kita, he destroyed the village of Goubanko, fifteen kilometers to the east. This was the instigation for Brière de l'Isle's removal by Minister Cloué. Cloué ordered Brière de l'Isle to pull back Borgnis-Desbordes forces, the Lt. Colonel did so, complaining to his commanders. In fact, Cloué had given strict orders that no movement to the east would take place as fellow Marine officer Joseph Gallieni was then in Segu, negotiating a trade treaty with the Toukolor leaders, and under virtual house arrest.

Borgnis-Desbordes returned to Paris in mid-1881, but instead of being punished, the Ministry began to throw their weight behind him. In fact, he became their expert on the Soudan, (Gallieni was now in Martinique recovering from his long stay in Segu) and Borgnis-Desbordes briefings carried much weight. The Lt. Colonel told the Ministry, then planning a series of slow topographical expeditions and enabling peace treaties for the rail line, that "The Peaceful conquest of the Niger is an illusion."

=== Second expedition to the Niger ===
Borgnis-Desbordes arrived in Saint-Louis in the midst of typhoid and then yellow fever outbreaks, causing his planned July mission to be suspended. The epidemics also killed the new Governor of Senegal, Rear-Admiral Delanneau, and led to disorder which his replacement, Colonel Canard, could not quell. While this pushed back Borgnis-Desbordes's plans, by 1882, he had cemented his position. The Ministry had no strong leader in Senegal, and Borgnis-Desbordes now had influence in Paris. His plan to build a fort past Kita was accepted, although his fort at Bamako was still blocked. The Lt. Colonel sent a column that reached the Niger, crossed the river, and attacked forces of Samory Toure that were besieging a local leader at Kiniéran. According to Borgnis-Desbordes, this was a punishment for a raid by Samory's troops on Gallieni's expedition the previous year. Although reprimanded, Borgnis-Desbordes was too crucial to the Ministry's plans to be removed. The longer-term consequences were more grave. This began an ongoing war with Samory that lasted until 1898, the longest conflict in France's African conquest.

In early March 1882, the French government approved funding for the railway (even at 7,500,000 francs, a doubling of previous requests), and placed Jauréguiberry, a former Governor of Senegal and supporter of expansion, as Minister of Marine. In May 1882, Governor Canard was replaced with Captain Vallon. Borgnis-Desbordes' push to occupy Bamako was again put off by the Ministry but the plan was supported by the Minister's advisors, Lt. Colonel Bourdiaux Director of Colonies Paul Dislère. After another visit to Paris in July–August 1882, Borgnis-Desbordes got his way, convincing leaders that only continued expansion would enable the rail project to be built in a timely manner. In August, Jauréguiberry ordered the occupation of Bamako without consulting Vallon, and Borgnis-Desbordes quickly made Vallon recognise his authority, forcing the governor to provide Senegal's garrison for the expansion in the Soudan, under Borgnis-Desbordes's command. Vallon resigned in the fall, and was replaced with René Servatius, the former attorney general of Martinique who had been forced to resign in a scandal, giving Borgnis-Desbordes all the political capital.

Borgnis-Desbordes attacked the Toukolor fortress at Mourgoula in December 1882, risking the reignition of war with the major empire of the central Niger valley. Marching to the east, Borgnis-Desbordes captured Daba in Beledougou, reached the Niger and began construction of the Fort at Bamako on 1 February 1883. On 19 April, Bamako was connected to Senegal by telegraph lines. Samory's forces attacked the new fort in April but were repulsed, freeing Borgnis-Desbordes troops to range far south of the Niger, and enabling him to force protectorate status on most of Beledougou. When word of the Bamako expedition reached France, Borgnis-Desbordes became a hero. Having secured the a rail line to the Niger, he returned to Paris, was promoted to Colonel, and was made head of the Haut-Senegal and Niger division of the Ministry.

== Indochina (1884–1900) ==
In 1884 he was transferred to Tonkin (northern Vietnam) in what became French Indochina. Borgnis-Desbordes was a commander during the Sino-French War, serving under his mentor Louis Brière de l'Isle, now commander of forces in the Tonkin Expeditionary Corps. After the defeat at the March 1885 Battle of Bang Bo, and the removal of Brière de l'Isle, Borgnis-Desbordes remained in Indochina and was promoted to Général de brigade in 1886. On 1 January 1889 he was made Commander in Chief of Troops in Indochina, and in 1890, Général de division. An adamant colonialist to the end, he is famously quoted as saying the War in Indochina "was a case of seeing what you wanted and taking it." Retiring from this command, he died in Hanoi on 18 July 1900.

== Monuments ==
Several streets are named for Borgnis-Desbordes in France, including the Rue Borgnis-Desbordes near the Borgnis-Desbordes Army Barracks in Versailles. His bust is also displayed in the Hotel de Ville in Versailles. Rue Borgnis-Desbordes in Dakar, Senegal has survived independence, ironically forming an intersection with Rue Brière de l'Isle. A statue of Borgnis-Desbordes in Bamako, commemorating his capture of the town in 1883, was torn down shortly after Mali's independence.

Government offices
Preceded by Charles Émile Boilève	Commandant-Superior of Haut-Sénégal; 6 September 1880–3 September 1883	Succeeded by Charles Émile Boilève
