= Diabi =

Diabi is both a given name and a surname. Notable people with the name include:

- Lanciné Diabi (born 1956), Ivorian filmmaker
