= Bissandugu =

Bissandugu Bissandugu
- Sub-prefecture
- Location within Guinea
- Coordinates: 9°55′59″N 9°09′23″W
- Country: Guinea
- Region: Kankan Region
- Prefecture: Kankan Prefecture

Population
  - Total: 1,000

Bissandugu (French: Bissandougou) is a city in southwestern Guinea on National Road 1. In the 19th century, it was the base for Samori Ture, a Dyula warlord who named the city in 1878 as the capital of his Wassoulou Empire (1878-1890). He was known for his resistance to French colonial forces and prevailed for years against them and smaller African states.

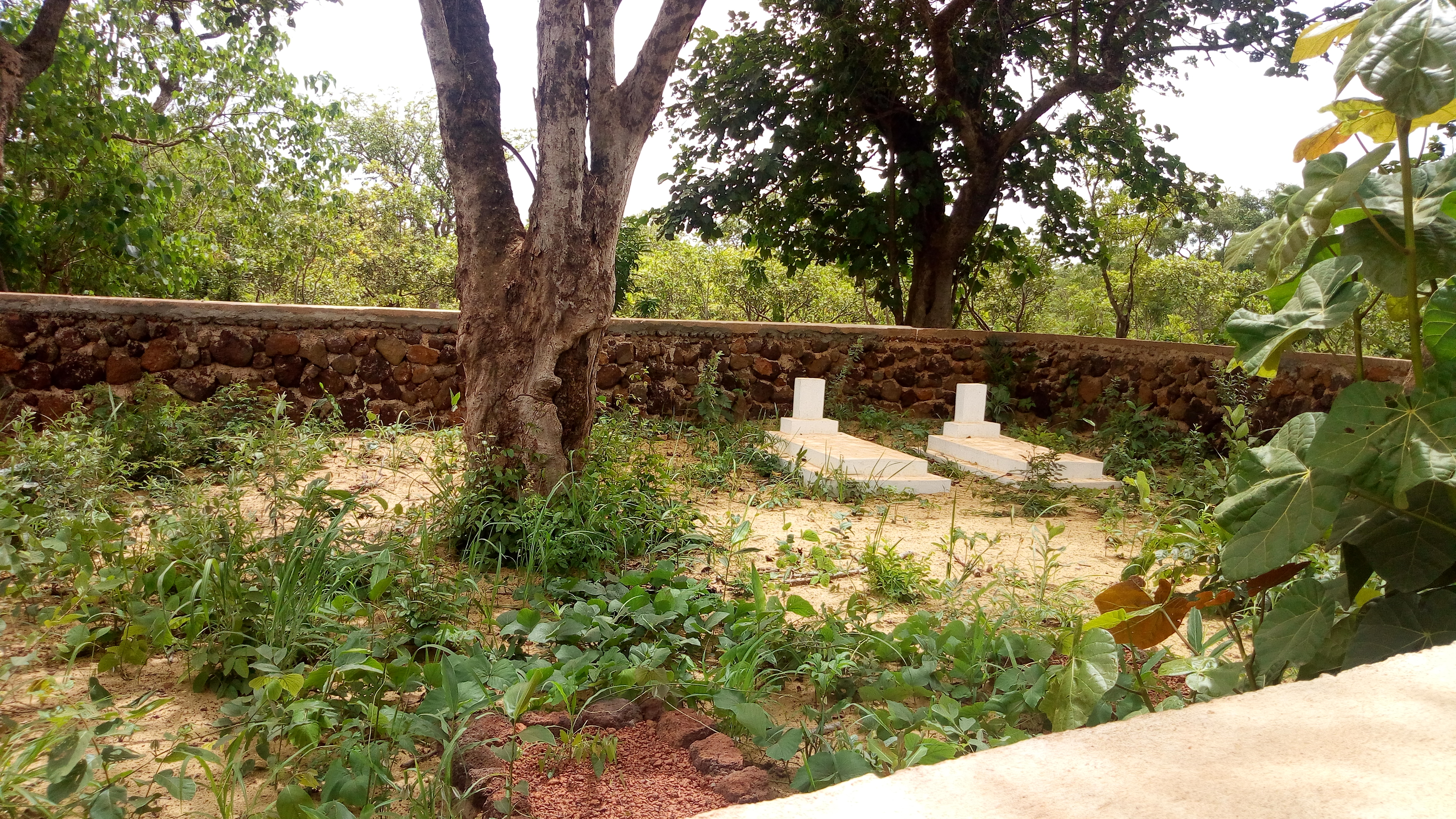
The mass grave of the French soldiers killed during the Battle of Bissandou, commonly known as Tubabu Falan (the cave of the white)

== History ==
The Treaty of Bissandugu was signed there on the 25 March 1887. The treaty had France obtain major rights of navigation on the Niger River, an important prelude to the French conquests of West Africa. The treaty also delimited the Wassoulou Empire's borders with France and made the Wassoulou Empire a French protectorate.

On April 9, 1891, the city was attacked and burned by French forces commanded by Colonel Louis Archinard during the Mandingo Wars. The French colonial administration re-established control in the area. Traces of the ancient fortifications of the city can still be found just outside the modern-day village.

After Guinea attained independence, Ture's great-grandson Ahmed Sékou Touré was elected as the country's first president.
