= Tintioule =

- Location in Guinea
- Coordinates: 10°12′N 9°12′W
- Country: Guinea
- Region: Kankan Region

Tintioule is a town in the Kankan Region of Guinea. In 1875 it was the site of a meeting between Karamo Mori Kaba, ruler of the Bate Empire, and Samory Toure to formalize an alliance against the animist Conde clan.
