= Dinguiraye =

- Sub-prefecture and town
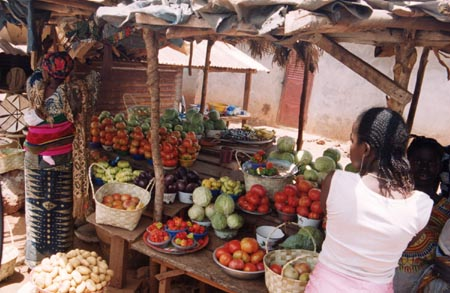
- Market in Dinguiraye

- Location in Guinea
- Coordinates: 11°18′N 10°43′W
- Country: Guinea
- Region: Faranah Region
- Prefecture: Dinguiraye Prefecture
- Founded: 1849

Government
  - Mayor: Amadou Tidiane Bah

Population (2014 census)
  - Total: 47,250

Dinguiraye (N’ko: ߘߌ߲ߞߌߙߊߦߌ߫ ) is a small town in northern Guinea, known for its large mosque which until recently was thatched. It was the first capital of the Tukulor Empire. As of 2014 it had a population of 47,250 people.

== History ==
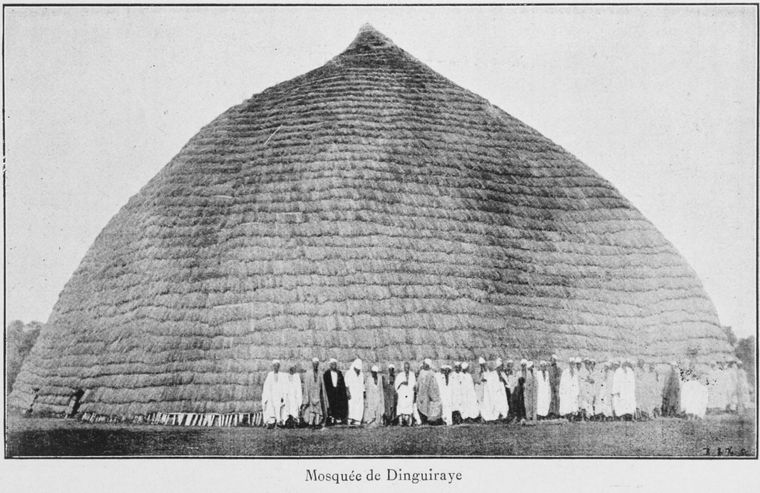
Mosque of Dinguiraye ca. 1900

Dinguiraye was founded by El Hajj Umar Tall in 1849, after being forced to leave the town of Diegunko in the Imamate of Futa Jallon. Tall bought the land from the Kingdom of Tamba with gold, and his community soon grew to 8-10000 people. Al-Hadj Umar commissioned the city's large mosque at this time. Engineers Samba Ndiaye and "Johnny" Bambara led the construction, as well as that of the town's tata. Dinguiraye was well placed on trade routes connecting the Niger river to the coast, with caravans frequently going back and forth to Freetown.

The king Dyimba Sako became concerned at the rising power of his new neighbor, and attacked them, but was defeated. Tall launched a full-scale jihad against animists and lapsed Muslims in 1852.

On May 21st, 1854, Tall left Dinguiraye to campaign in the north. He never returned. His son Habibou was left in command. After Tall's death in 1864, his son Ahmadu succeeded him. Habibou joined a rebellion in 1870, and was captured and imprisoned. Leadership of Dinguiraye fell to Ahmadu's cousin Saidou, but he was killed in battle in 1876. Aguibou Tall arrived to take over the governorship in late 1878 or early 1879.

Aguibou was geographically isolated from the rest of the rest of the Toucouleur Empire, and made overtures to the French for protection. In May 1891, Dinguiraye was annexed to the French colonial empire. Shortly thereafter, Aguibou was made Faama of Massina, and his son Makki took over as leader in Dinguiraye. In 1899, however, the French removed him and sent him into exile, reorganizing the territory and ending even Dinguiraye's nominal independence.

== Notable people ==
- Saïdou Bokoum (1945-) - writer
- Aguibou Tall (1843-1907) - Faama
