= Kiniéran =

- Sub-prefecture and town
- Location in Guinea
- Coordinates: 11°07′N 8°56′W
- Country: Guinea
- Region: Kankan Region
- Prefecture: Mandiana Prefecture

Population (2014)
  - Total: 37,944
- Time zone: UTC+0 (GMT)

Kiniéran is a town and sub-prefecture in the Mandiana Prefecture in the Kankan Region of eastern Guinea. As of 2014 it had a population of 37,944 people.

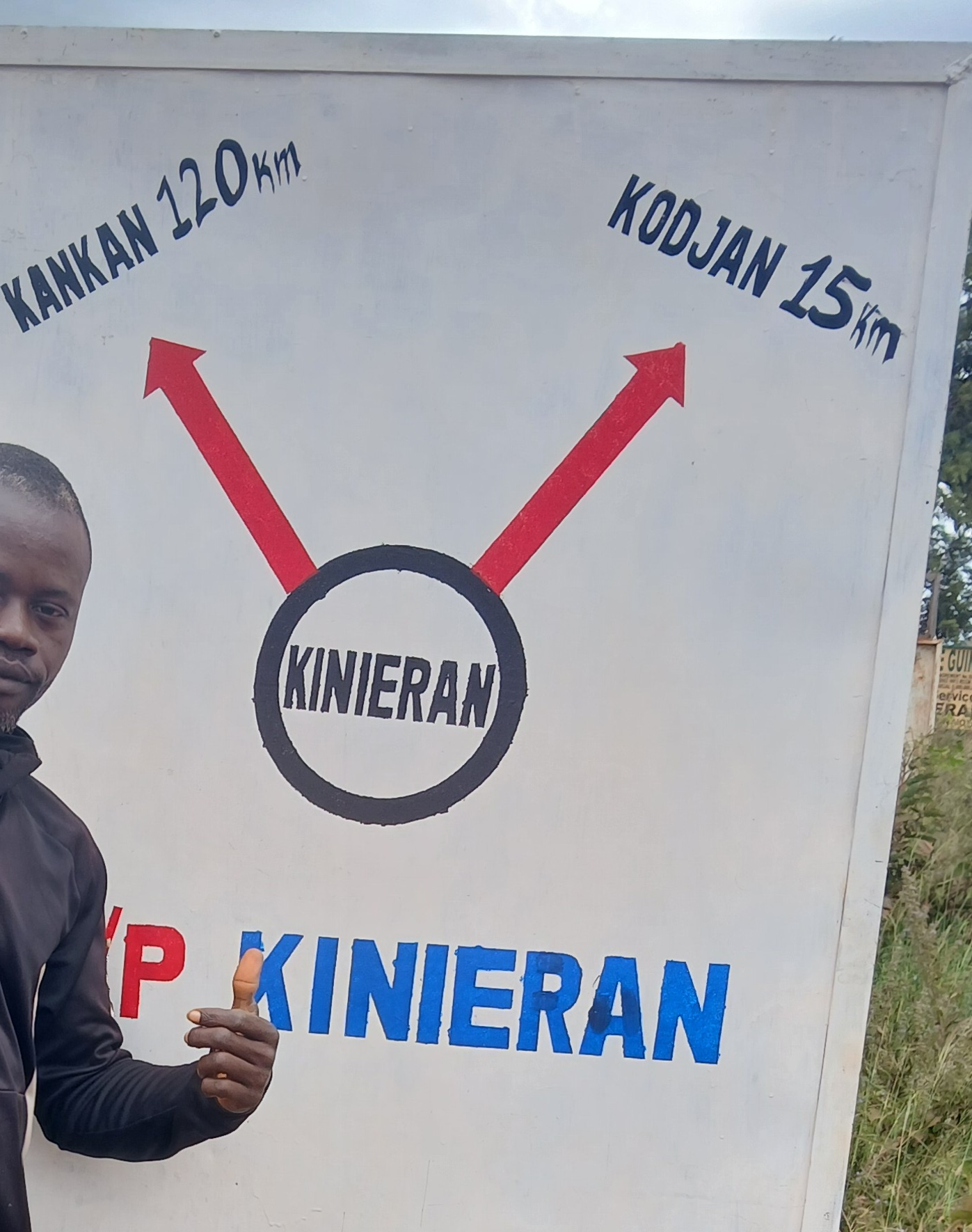
KINIERA Rond point

After the fall of Kankan to Samory Toure in 1880, one of the city's leaders, Daye Kaba, fled to Kinieran. He reached out to Gustave Borgnis-Desbordes, commander of the French garrison at Kita, Mali, for protection. Toure ignored the French claims to a protectorate, however, and sacked the city on February 21, 1882. The French relief column arrived too late, but pursued the Wassoulou army, which turned and fought at Samaya on the 26th. The sofas traditional frontal charges became a slaughter when faced with the latest French weaponry, but Samori quickly adapted by adopting guerrilla tactics and hit-and-run cavalry attacks. They harassed the French back to the Niger river, winning Toure a reputation as the African leader who could stand up to the invading toubab.
