= Lanciné Diabi =

Ivorian filmmaker

- Born: 1956 (age 69–70); Ivory Coast
- Education: Conservatoire libre du cinéma français
- Occupation: filmmaker.

Lanciné Diabi (born 1956) is an Ivorian filmmaker.

== Life ==
Lanciné Diabi was born 1956 in Ivory Coast. He studied filmmaking at the Conservatoire libre du cinéma français in Paris. His first feature film, La Jumelle, about a twin sister who sacrifices her luck for that of her twin brother, was entered for competition at the 1999 FESPACO.

== Films ==
- L'Amour Blesse, 1989.
- L'Africaine, 1989.
- Sanou, 1989.
- L'Africaine a Paris, 1993.
- La Jumelle / The Twin Girl, 1994 or 1998.
