= Faama =

Nobility title

Faama is a Mandinka word meaning "father," "leader," or "king". It was commonly used within the area of pre-imperial Mali. The title spread into areas conquered by Mali and was later used by the Bamana Empire and the Wassoulou Empire of Samori Toure and non-Mandinka groups in the Kenedougou Empire.

Both faama and mansa are word for king, but faama is a martial ruler and mansa is a mystic ruler.

== See also ==
- Mali Empire
- Kenedougou Empire
- Wassoulou Empire
- Bamana Empire
- Keita Dynasty
- Kabadougou Kingdom
