= Louis Archinard =

French Army general

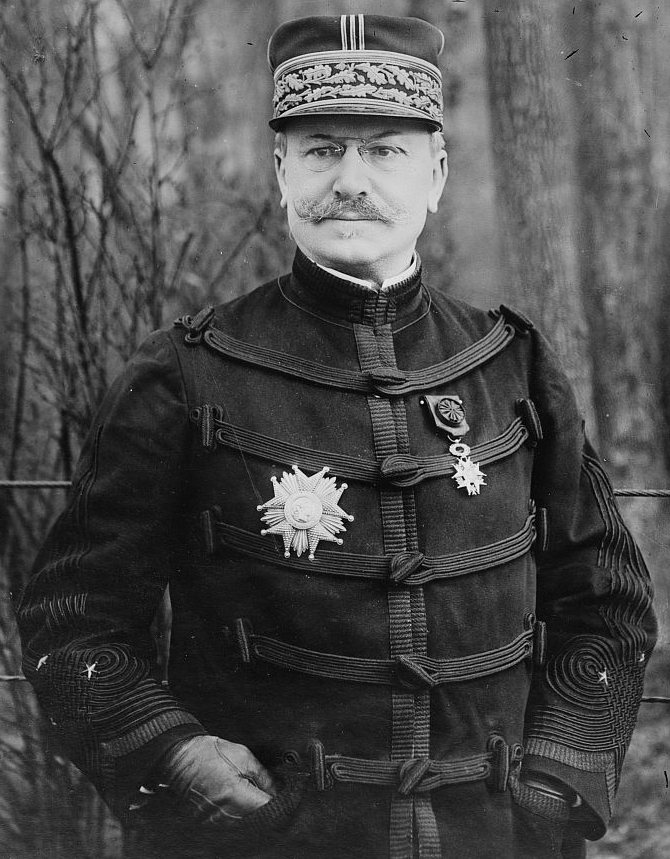
- General Archinard
- Born: 11 February 1850; Le Havre, France
- Died: 8 May 1932 (aged 82); Villiers-le-Bel, France
- Military career
- Allegiance: France
- Branch: French Army
- Service years: 1870–1915; 1917–1919
- Rank: General de division
- Commands: 32nd Infantry Division
- Conflicts: Franco-Prussian War; World War I; Mandingo Wars
- Awards: Grand Cross of the Légion d'honneur; Médaille militaire; Croix de guerre 1914-1918

Louis Archinard (11 February 1850 – 8 May 1932) was a French Army general at the time of the Third Republic, who contributed to the colonial conquest of French West Africa. He was traditionally presented in French histories as the conqueror and "Pacifier" of French Sudan (today Mali). Archinard's campaigns brought about the end of the Tukulor Empire. He also spent a large amount of energy fighting Samory Toure.

Archinard was succeeded as military commander of the Sudan in 1893 by Eugène Bonnier, who left from Bordeaux on 5 August 1893 to take up his new command. Bonnier had no instructions and decided to follow Archinard's advice, use his own judgement and seize Timbuktu. He was killed on 15 December 1893 by a force of Tuaregs.

In 1897 Archinard was reassigned to French Indochina. In World War I, he commanded in August 1914 the 1er Group of Reserve Divisions, and in 1917-1918 the Polish Legion in France.

== Decorations ==
- Légion d'honneur
  - Knight (25 August 1881)
  - Officer (9 July 1889)
  - Commander (11 July 1903)
  - Grand Officer (30 December 1908)
  - Grand Cross (11 July 1914)
- Médaille militaire (6 July 1919)
- Croix de guerre 1914-1918
- Médaille Interalliée 1914–1918
- Commemorative medal of the 1870–1871 War.
- Médaille commémorative de la guerre 1914–1918
- Médaille Coloniale with "Soudan" bar.

== Sources ==
- E. Réquin, Archinard et le Soudan, Éditions Berger-Levrault, 1946
- Martine Cuttier, Portrait du colonialisme triomphant - Louis Archinard 1850-1932, Éditions Lavauzelle, 2006 - ISBN 2-7025-1297-6
- A. S. Kanya-Forstner, The Conquest of the Western Sudan (Cambridge University Press, 1969). Chapter VII. The `Total Conquest' of the Sudan, 1888-93.
- O'Toole, Thomas E., Historical Dictionary of Guinea, (Metuchen, New Jersey: The Scarecrow Press, 1987) p. 18
- Porch, Douglas (2005-06-22), The Conquest of the Sahara: A History, Farrar, Straus and Giroux, ISBN 978-1-4299-2209-8
