= Farimaké =

- Commune
- Location in Mali
- Coordinates: 15°28′12″N 4°36′44″W
- Country: Mali
- Region: Mopti Region
- Cercle: Youwarou Cercle

Area
  - Total: 3,148 km^{2} (1,215 sq mi)

Population (2009)
  - Total: 11,869
  - Density: 3.770/km^{2} (9.765/sq mi)
- Time zone: UTC+0 (GMT)

Farimaké is a commune of the Cercle of Youwarou in the Mopti Region of Mali. The local government is based in the village of Gathi-Loumbo. The commune covers an area of 3,148 km^{2}. It is bounded to the west by the commune of Youwarou, to the north by the communes of Dianké, Léré and Alzounoub, to the east by the commune of Nampalari and to the south by the communes of Kareri, Toguéré Coumbé and Bimbere Tama. The commune lies to the west of the Issa-Ber, the larger of the two branches of the Niger River that flow out of Lake Débo. The commune contains 29 small villages and in 2009 had a population of 11,869. The largest ethnic group are the Fulani (French: Peuls or Peuhls; Fula: Fulɓe) who make up more than 40 percent of the population.

The commune contains around 5,100 ha of land that can be cultivated. The rainfall is low, around 300 mm a year, and with large year-to-year variations. The main crops are pearl millet and sorghum, most of which are consumed by the local farmers themselves. The main economic activity is livestock rearing.
