= Sah, Mali =

Sah
- Village
- Location in Mali
- Coordinates: 15°37′33″N 4°2′56″W
- Country: Mali
- Region: Mopti Region
- Cercle: Youwarou Cercle
- Commune: N'Dodjiga
- Time zone: UTC+0 (GMT)

Sah (or Sa) is a village and seat of the commune of N'Dodjiga in the Cercle of Youwarou in the Mopti Region of southern-central Mali. The village lies on the east (right) bank of the Bara-Issa, the smaller of the two branches of the Niger River that flow north out of Lake Débo.

The French explorer, René Caillié stopped at Sah in April 1828 on his journey by boat from Djenné to Timbuktu. He was surprised at the extent of the commercial activity at what was then an important port:

There were in the port of Sa from four to five hundred persons seamen and inhabitants who gazed at the flotilla. The port was covered with bales of merchandise, ready to be shipped on board the canoes. The commercial activity appeared astonishing. There was something in the appearance of the flotilla far more interesting than I could have expected to find in the interior of Africa. The bustle on every side almost made me fancy myself in a trading port of Europe. The largest vessels belong to Moors, who carry on the principal trade of the country: they form themselves into companies and employ their canoes in conveying merchandise to Timbuctoo, where they are paid their freight in salt or cowries.

Nowadays, boats use the larger branch of the Niger River, the Issa-Ber, and the port of Sah sees very little activity.
