= René Caillié =

French explorer (1799–1838)

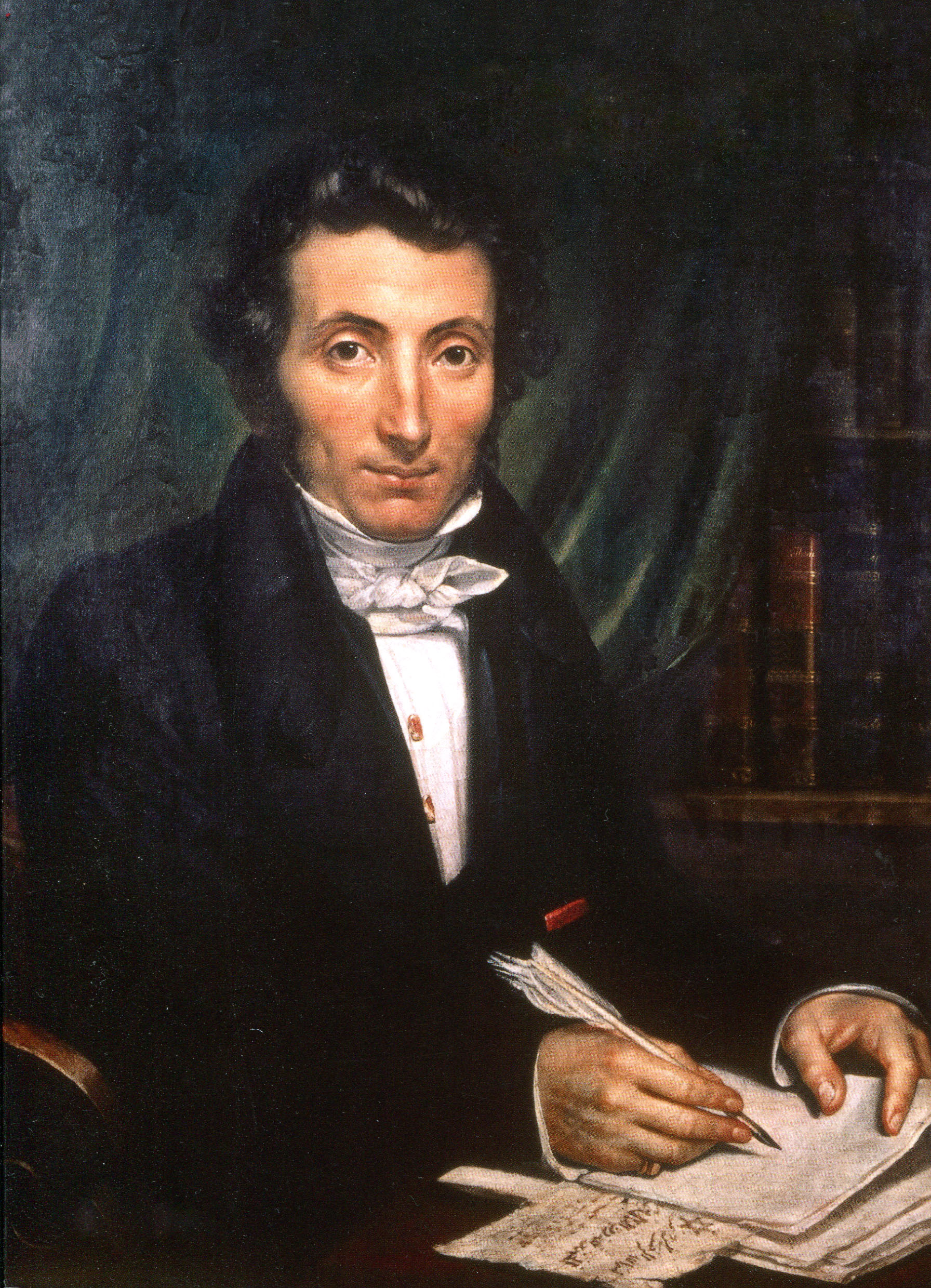
- Portrait by Amélie Legrand de Saint-Aubin
- Born: 19 November 1799; Mauzé-sur-le-Mignon, Deux-Sèvres, France
- Died: 17 May 1838 (aged 38); La Gripperie-Saint-Symphorien, Charente-Inférieure, France
- Known for: Visit to Timbuktu in 1828
- Spouse: Caroline Têtu (m. 1830)
- Children: 4
- Awards: Legion of Honour – Knight (1828)

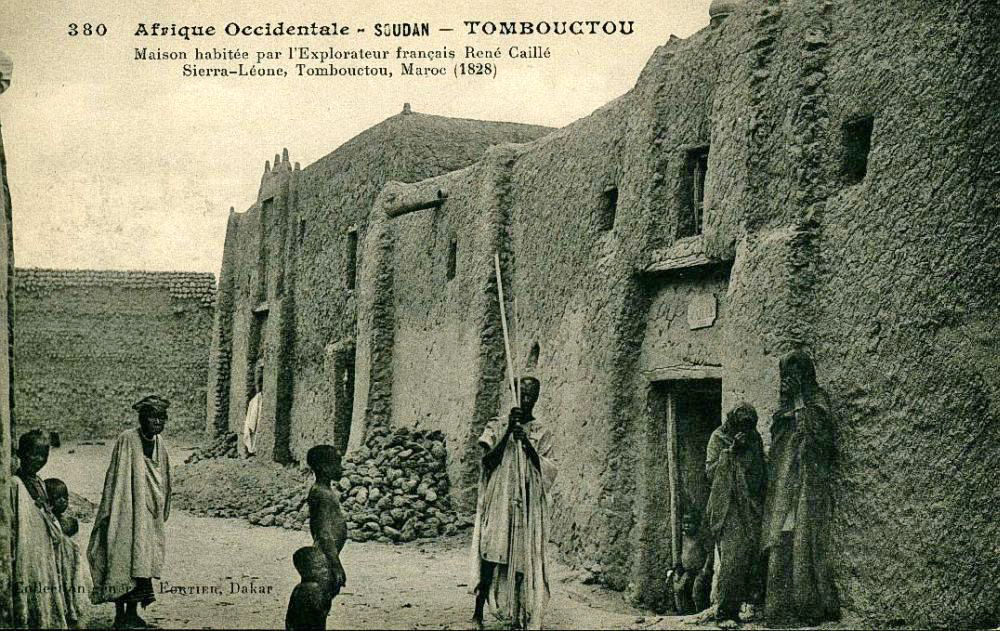
Postcard by Edmond Fortier showing the house where Caillié stayed in Timbuktu as it appeared in 1905–06

Auguste René Caillié (Note: Caillié spelled his family name as both Caillié and Caillé. His birth was registered as Caillié although his father used Caillé. René's siblings were registered as either Caillé or Caillet. His first name was sometimes written as Réné with two accents. After his return from Timbuktu, Caillié would use the first name "Auguste" when signing his personal correspondence.) (French pronunciation: [ʁəne kaje]; 19 November 1799 – 17 May 1838) was a French explorer and the first European to return alive from the town of Timbuktu. Caillié had been preceded at Timbuktu by a British officer, Major Gordon Laing, who was murdered in September 1826 on leaving the city. Caillié was therefore the first to return alive.

Caillié was born in western France in a village near the port of Rochefort. His parents were poor and died while he was still young. At the age of 16 he left home and signed up as a member of the crew on a French naval vessel sailing to Saint-Louis on the coast of modern Senegal in western Africa. He stayed there for several months and then crossed the Atlantic to Guadeloupe on a merchantman. He made a second visit to West Africa two years later when he accompanied a British expedition across the Ferlo Desert to Bakel on the Senegal River.

Caillié returned to Saint-Louis in 1824 with a strong desire to become an explorer and visit Timbuktu. In order to avoid some of the difficulties experienced by the earlier expeditions, he planned to travel alone disguised as a Muslim. He persuaded the French governor in Saint-Louis to help finance a stay of 8 months with the nomadic people in the Brakna Region of southern Mauritania where he learned Arabic and the customs of Islam. He failed to obtain further funding from either the French or the British governments, but encouraged by the prize of 9,000 francs offered by the Société de Géographie in Paris for the first person to return with a description of Timbuktu, he decided to fund the journey himself. He worked for a few months in the British colony of Sierra Leone to save some money, then travelled by ship to Boké on the Rio Nuñez in modern Guinea. From there in April 1827 he set off across West Africa. He arrived in Timbuktu a year later and stayed there for two weeks before heading across the Sahara Desert to Tangier in Morocco.

On his return to France, he was awarded the prize of 9,000 francs by the Société de Géographie and, helped by the scholar Edme-François Jomard, published an account of his journey. In 1830, he was awarded the Gold Medal by the Société de Géographie.

Caillié married and settled near his birthplace. He suffered from poor health and died of tuberculosis aged 38.

== Early life ==
René Caillié was born on 19 November 1799 in Mauzé-sur-le-Mignon, a village in the department of Deux-Sèvres in western France. (Note: Caillié, in his book Travels through Central Africa to Timbuctoo, incorrectly gives the year of his birth as 1800.) His father, François Caillé, had worked as a baker but four months before René was born he was accused of petty theft and sentenced to 12 years of hard labour in a penal colony at Rochefort. He died there in 1808, at the age of 46. René's mother, Élizabeth née Lépine, (Note: The death certificate of Caillié's mother gives her first name as "Anne". That is also the name given by Jomard in 1839. However, Élizabeth is used on her marriage certificate, on René's birth certificate and on René's own marriage certificate.) died three years later in 1811 at the age of 38. After her death, René and his 18-year-old sister, Céleste, were cared for by their maternal grandmother.

== First trips to Africa ==
In the introduction to his Travels through Central Africa to Timbuctoo, Caillié described how as a teenager he had been fascinated by books on travel and exploration:

... and as soon as I could read and write, I was put to learn a trade, to which I soon took a dislike, owing to the reading of voyages and travels, which occupied all my leisure moments. The History of Robinson Crusoe, in particular, inflamed my young imagination : I was impatient to encounter adventures like him; nay, I already felt an ambition to signalize myself by some important discovery springing up in my heart.

Caillié left home at the age of 16 with 60 francs that he had inherited from his grandmother. (Note: Quella-Villéger (2012) suggests that this would have been equivalent to a month's salary of a well-paid workman.) He made his way to the port of Rochefort, 50 km (31 mi) from Mauzé-sur-le-Mignon on the River Charente. There he signed up as a crew member on the Loire, a French naval storeship that was to accompany the frigate Méduse and two other vessels on a voyage to reclaim the French colony of Saint-Louis from the British under the terms of the 1814 and 1815 Paris Treaties. The four ships left their anchorage near the Île d'Aix at the mouth of the Charente River in June 1816. The Méduse went ahead of the Loire and was wrecked on the Bank of Arguin off the coast of present-day Mauritania. A few survivors were picked up by the other vessels. The shipwreck received a large amount of publicity and was the subject of a famous oil painting, The Raft of the Medusa, by Théodore Géricault. When the three remaining French ships arrived at Saint-Louis they found that the British governor was not ready to hand over the colony so the ships continued southwards and moored off the island of Gorée, near Dakar. Caillié spent some months in Dakar, then only a village, before returning by ship to Saint-Louis. There he learned that an English expedition led by Major William Gray was preparing to leave from the Gambia to explore the interior of the continent. Caillié wished to offer his services and set off along the coast with two companions. He intended to cover the 300 km (190 mi) on foot but found the oppressive heat and lack of water exhausting. He abandoned his plan at Dakar and instead obtained a free passage on a merchantman across the Atlantic to Guadeloupe.

Caillié found employment for six months in Guadeloupe. While there he read Mungo Park's account of his exploration of the Middle Niger in present-day Mali. Park had been the first European to reach the Niger River and visit the towns of Ségou, Sansanding and Bamako. An account of his first trip had been published in French in 1799. Park made a second expedition beginning in 1805 but was drowned in descending the rapids on the Niger, near Bussa, in present-day Nigeria. An account of the second trip had been published in English in 1815.

Caillié returned to Bordeaux in France and then travelled to Senegal where he arrived at end of 1818. He made a journey into the interior to the pre-colonial state of Bundu to carry supplies for a British expedition but he fell ill with fever and was obliged to return to France.

In 1824 he returned to Senegal for the third time with the desire to visit the African interior. The Paris-based Société de Géographie was offering a 9,000-franc reward to the first European to see and return alive from Timbuktu, believing it to be a rich and wondrous city. (Note: The prize included donations from individual members of the society and had a total value of 9,025 francs.) He spent eight months with the Brakna Moors living north of the Senegal River, learning Arabic and being taught, as a convert, the laws and customs of Islam. He laid his project of reaching Timbuktu before the governor of Senegal, but receiving no encouragement went to Sierra Leone where the British authorities made him superintendent of an indigo plantation. Having saved £80 he joined a Mandingo caravan going inland. He was dressed as a Muslim, and gave out that he was an Arab from Egypt who had been carried off by the French to Senegal and was desirous of regaining his own country.

== Journey to Timbuktu ==
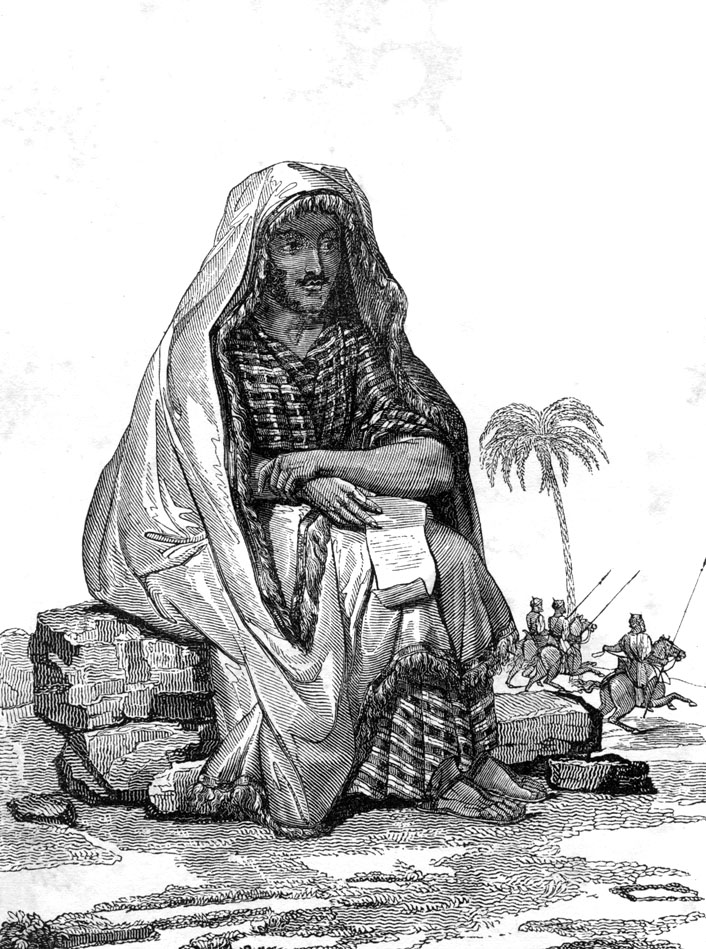
Dressed in Arab clothing

Starting from Kakondy near Boké on the Rio Nuñez on 19 April 1827, Caillié travelled east along the hills of Fouta Djallon, passing the head streams of the Senegal River and crossing the Upper Niger at Kurussa (now Kouroussa).

Caillié reached Kankan in present-day Guinea on 17 June 1827 travelling with a caravan transporting kola nuts. He stayed there for a month. The town was an important commercial centre with a market held three times a week. Instead of having a surrounding mud wall, the town was defended by quickset hedges. Caillié was advised not to travel north along the Milo River as the town of Kankan was fighting for control of the Bouré gold producing area around Siguiri and the Tinkisso River. Instead Caillié left the town heading east in the direction of Minignan in the Ivory Coast. He wished to visit Djenné but wanted to avoid the town of Ségou on the Niger River as Ségou was at war with Djenné. He also feared that he might be recognised as a Christian in Ségou as Mungo Park had visited the town in 1796.

Continuing eastwards he reached the Kong highlands, where at the village of Tiémé in present-day Ivory Coast, he was detained for five months (3 August 1827 – 9 January 1828) by illness. Resuming his journey in January 1828 he went north-east and reached the city of Djenné, where he stayed 11–23 March. Djenné lies 5 km (3.1 mi) north of the Bani River to which it is connected by a narrow channel that is only navigable in the wet season. Caillié confused the Bani with the Niger River (which he referred to as the Dhioliba). The Bani joins the Niger 115 km (71 mi) downstream from Djenné at Mopti (Caillié's Isaca). From Djenné he continued his journey to Timbuktu on a boat transporting merchandise. After two days they arrived at the village of Kouna where the cargo was transferred to a larger vessel. The boat crossed Lac Débo and then followed the more easterly and smaller branch of the river, the Bara-Issa. At the busy port of Sa they were joined by 30 or 40 other vessels also heading for Timbuktu as travelling in a flotilla provided some degree of protection against bandits. He arrived in Timbuktu on 20 April 1828.

In 1550 Leo Africanus described the inhabitants of Timbuktu as being very rich with a king that possessed large quantities of gold. The perception of Timbuktu as a very wealthy city had been fuelled by various accounts published in the 18th and early 19th centuries. Caillié recorded his first impression of the town: "I had formed a totally different idea of the grandeur and wealth of Timbuktu. The city presented, at first view, nothing but a mass of ill looking houses, built of earth." He compared it unfavorably with Djenne:

... afterwards I took a turn round the city. I found it neither so large nor so populous as I had expected. Its commerce is not so considerable as fame has reported. There was not as at Jenné [Djenné] a concourse of strangers from all parts of the Soudan. I saw in the streets of Timbuctoo only the camels, which had arrived from Cabra [Kabara] laden with the merchandise of the flotilla, a few groups of the inhabitants sitting on mats, conversing together, and Moors lying asleep in the shade before their doors. In a word everything had a dull appearance.

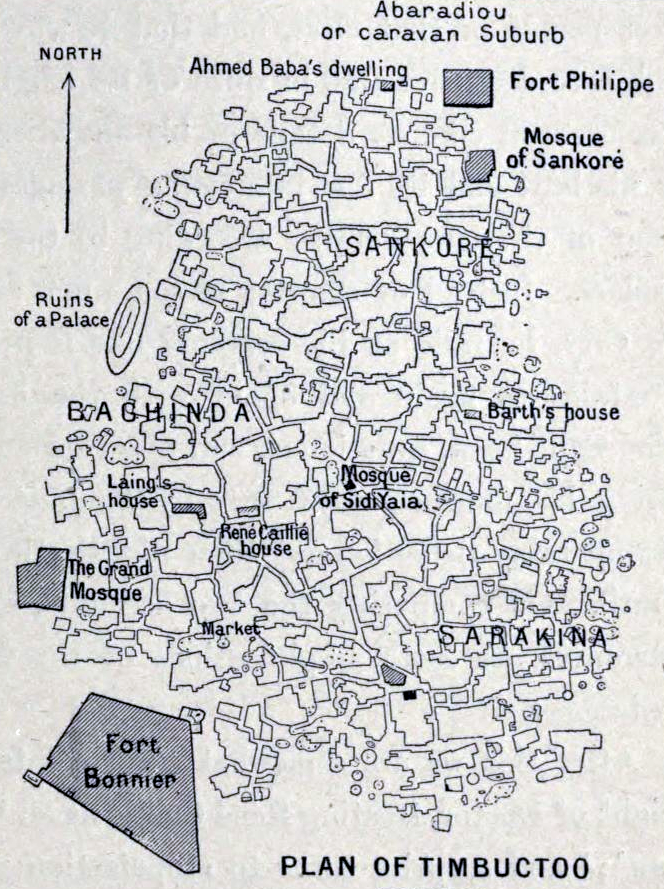
A plan of Timbuctoo around 1896, showing the house where Caillié stayed, between the Djinguereber and Sidi Yahya mosques

After spending a fortnight in Timbuktu, Caillié left the city on 4 May 1828 accompanying a caravan of 600 camels heading north across the Sahara Desert. (Note: Caillié gives two different estimates of the number of camels in the caravan leaving Timbuktu. In the main body of the text he states that the camels numbered "nearly 600", while in the Itinerary section at the end of the book he gives 700–800 camels. The discrepancy is also present in the French edition. Both the main text and the Itinerary section agree that the caravan included 1,400 camels when departing from Araouane.) After six days the caravan reached Araouane, a village 243 km (151 mi) north of Timbuktu that acted as an entrepôt in the trans-Sahara trade. When the caravan left Araouane on 19 May it included 1,400 camels and 400 men. It was transporting slaves, gold, ivory, gum, ostrich feathers, clothing and cloth. Caillie reached Fez on 12 August. From Tangier he returned by frigate to Toulon in France.

Caillié had been preceded at Timbuktu by a British officer, Major Gordon Laing, who was murdered in September 1826 on leaving the city. Caillié was the first to return alive. He became a Knight of the Legion of Honour by decree on 10 December 1828. He was awarded the prize of 9,000 francs offered by the Société de Géographie to the first traveller to gain exact information of Timbuktu, and in 1830 along with Laing was awarded the society's gold medal, a pension, and other distinctions. It was at the public expense that his Journal d'un voyage à Temboctou et à Jenné dans l'Afrique Centrale, etc. (edited by Edme-François Jomard) was published in three volumes in 1830.

The next European to visit Timbuktu was the German explorer Heinrich Barth who arrived in 1853. When describing the Djinguereber Mosque Barth wrote:

It was here especially that I convinced myself, not only of the trustworthy character of Caillié's report in general, of which I had already had an opportunity of judging, but also the accuracy with which, under very unfavourable circumstances in which he was placed, he has described the various objects that fell under his observation.

However, Barth criticised Caillié's picture of Timbuktu showing detached houses "while, in reality, the streets are entirely shut in, as the dwellings form continuous and uninterrupted rows." No European visited Djenné until April 1893 when French troops under the command of Louis Archinard occupied the town.

== Death and legacy ==
Caillié died of tuberculosis on 17 May 1838, at La Gripperie-Saint-Symphorien, in the department of Charente-Maritime where he owned the manor L'Abadaire.

Caillié is remarkable for his approach to exploration. In a period when large-scale expeditions supported by soldiers and employing black porters were the norm, Caillié spent years learning Arabic, studying the customs and Islamic religion before setting off with a companion and later on his own, travelling and living as the natives did. His opinion of Timbuktu was very different from that of Laing, who described it as a wondrous city. Caillié stated that it was a small, unimportant and poor town with no hint of the fabled reputation that had preceded it.

== Works ==
- Caillié, Réné (1830a), "Description de la ville de Temboctou", Revue des deux mondes (in French), 1: 254–295.
- Caillié, René (1830b), Travels through Central Africa to Timbuctoo; and across the Great Desert, to Morocco, performed in the years 1824–1828 (2 Vols), London: Colburn & Bentley. Google books: Volume 1, Volume 2.
- Caillié, René (1830c), Journal d'un voyage à Temboctou et à Jenné, dans l'Afrique centrale ... pendant les années 1824, 1825, 1826, 1827, 1828 ... Avec une carte itinéraire, et des remarques géographiques, par M. Jomard. (3 Vols) (in French), Paris: Imprimerie Royale. Gallica: Volume 1, Volume 2, Volume 3. Google books: Volume 1, Volume 2, Volume 3.

== Sources ==
- Anonymous (1825). "Programme des prix: Encouragement pour un voyage à Tombouctou et dans l'intéreur de l'Afrique". Bulletin de la Société de Géographie (in French). 3: 209–212. Archived from the original on 22 April 2019.
- Anonymous (1828). "Paris Geographical Society: Prizes for Encouragement for Travels in Africa: Voyage to Timbuctoo and in the interior of Africa". The Quarterly Review. 38 (76). Archived from the original on 16 March 2022.
- Anonymous (1830). "Procès-verbal de la Séance générale du 26 mar 1830". Bulletin de la Société de Géographie (in French). 13: 176–177. Archived from the original on 16 March 2022.
- Archinard, Louis (1895). Le Soudan en 1893 (in French). Le Havre, France: Imprimer de la Société des Anciens Courtiers. Archived from the original on 30 April 2019.
- Barth, Heinrich (1857). Travels and discoveries in North and Central Africa: Being a journal of an expedition undertaken under the auspices of H. B. M.'s government, in the years 1849–1855. (3 Vols). New York: Harper & Brothers. Google books: Volume 1 Archived 26 September 2020 at the Wayback Machine, Volume 2 Archived 20 August 2020 at the Wayback Machine, Volume 3.
- Hunwick, John O. (1999). Timbuktu and the Songhay Empire: Al-Sadi's Tarikh al-Sudan down to 1613 and other contemporary documents. Leiden: Brill. ISBN 90-04-11207-3.
- Jomard, Edme François (1839). Notice historique sur la vie et les voyages de René Caillié: accompagnée d'un portrait (in French). Paris: Delauny. Archived from the original on 16 March 2022.
- Leo Africanus (1600). A Geographical Historie of Africa, written in Arabicke and Italian. Before which is prefixed a generall description of Africa, and a particular treatise of all the lands undescribed. Translated and collected by John Pory. London: G. Bishop.
- Masonen, Pekka (2000). The Negroland Revisited: Discovery and Invention of the Sudanese Middle Ages. Helsinki: Finnish Academy of Science and Letters. ISBN 951-41-0886-8.
- Park, Mungo (1799a). Voyage dans l'intérieur de l'Afrique : fait en 1795, 1796 et 1797 (in French). Castéra J. transl. Paris: Dentu and Cartellet. Scans from Internet archive: Volume 1, Volume 2.
- Park, Mungo (1799b). Travels in the Interior Districts of Africa: Performed Under the Direction and Patronage of the African Association, in the Years 1795, 1796, and 1797. London: W. Bulmer and Company. Archived from the original on 19 October 2020.
- Park, Mungo (1815). The Journal of a Mission to the Interior of Africa, in the Year 1805: Together with other documents, official and private, relating to the same mission : to which is prefixed an account of the life of Mr. Park. London: John Murray.
- Quella-Villéger, Alain (2012). René Caillié, l'Africain : une vie d'explorateur, 1799–1838 (in French). Anglet, France: Aubéron. ISBN 978-2-84498-137-0.
- This article incorporates text from a publication now in the public domain: Chisholm, Hugh, ed. (1911). "Caillié, René Auguste". Encyclopædia Britannica (11th ed.). Cambridge University Press.
