= Inner Niger Delta =

Inland delta of the Niger River

Delta Intérieur du Niger
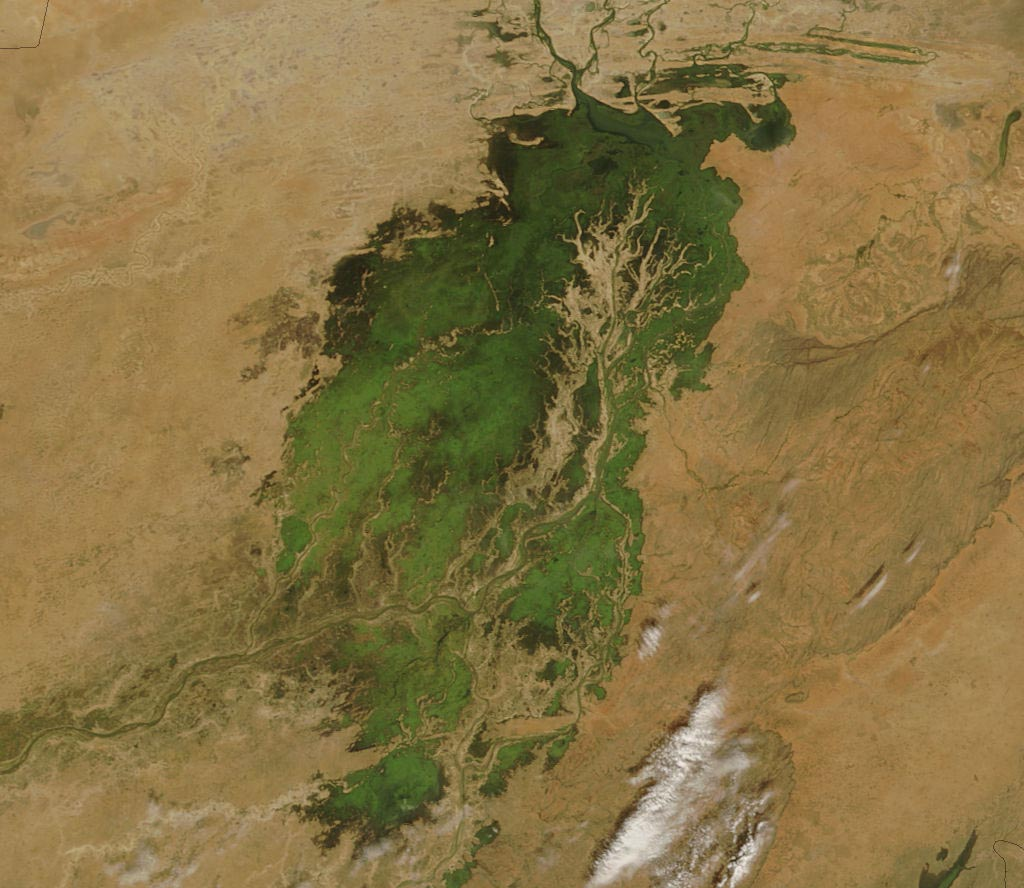
- Inland Niger Delta
- Interactive map of Delta Intérieur du Niger
- Location: Sahel area of central Mali
- Coordinates: 15°12′N 4°6′W
- Area: 4,119,500 ha (15,905 sq mi)

Ramsar Wetland
- Official name: Delta Intérieur du Niger
- Designated: 1 February 2004
- Reference no.: 1365

The Inner Niger Delta, also known as the Macina or Masina, is the inland river delta of the Niger River. It is an area of fluvial wetlands, lakes and floodplains in the semi-arid Sahel area of central Mali, just south of the Sahara Desert.

== Location and description ==
The delta consists of the middle course of the Niger River, between the bifurcated Niger and its tributary the Bani, which from here run north towards the desert. The Niger is the longest river in West Africa. Towns such as the river-port of Mopti, Sévaré and Djenné, with its mud-brick Great Mosque lie in the 400 km-long region.

The Fulani and Dogon inhabit the Macina region and the surrounding area, which has a population of over 500,000. Most of the year the area has a hot and dry climate, with hot winds from the nearby Sahara raising the temperature up to 40 °C or 104 °F. During the wet season, which generally lasts from June to September but is longer the further south one goes, the swamp floods into a lake and naturally irrigates the land. When the dry season comes, the Macina turns into a network of lakes and channels. Cattle, pearl millet, and rice are its important agricultural products. The Macina inland delta also provides water and fish for the Malians living there and during the wet season is a haven for large numbers of birds.

Due to its proximity to the widening Sahel, there have been concerns that the Macina may be getting less rain every year.

== History ==
In the early 19th century, Seku Amadu founded a Massina Empire in the region, building a capital at Hamdullahi in 1820. The Massina fell to El Hadj Umar Tall's Toucouleur Empire in 1862, who in turn fell to the French army. The region became a part of the country of Mali on its independence in 1960.

== Ecology ==
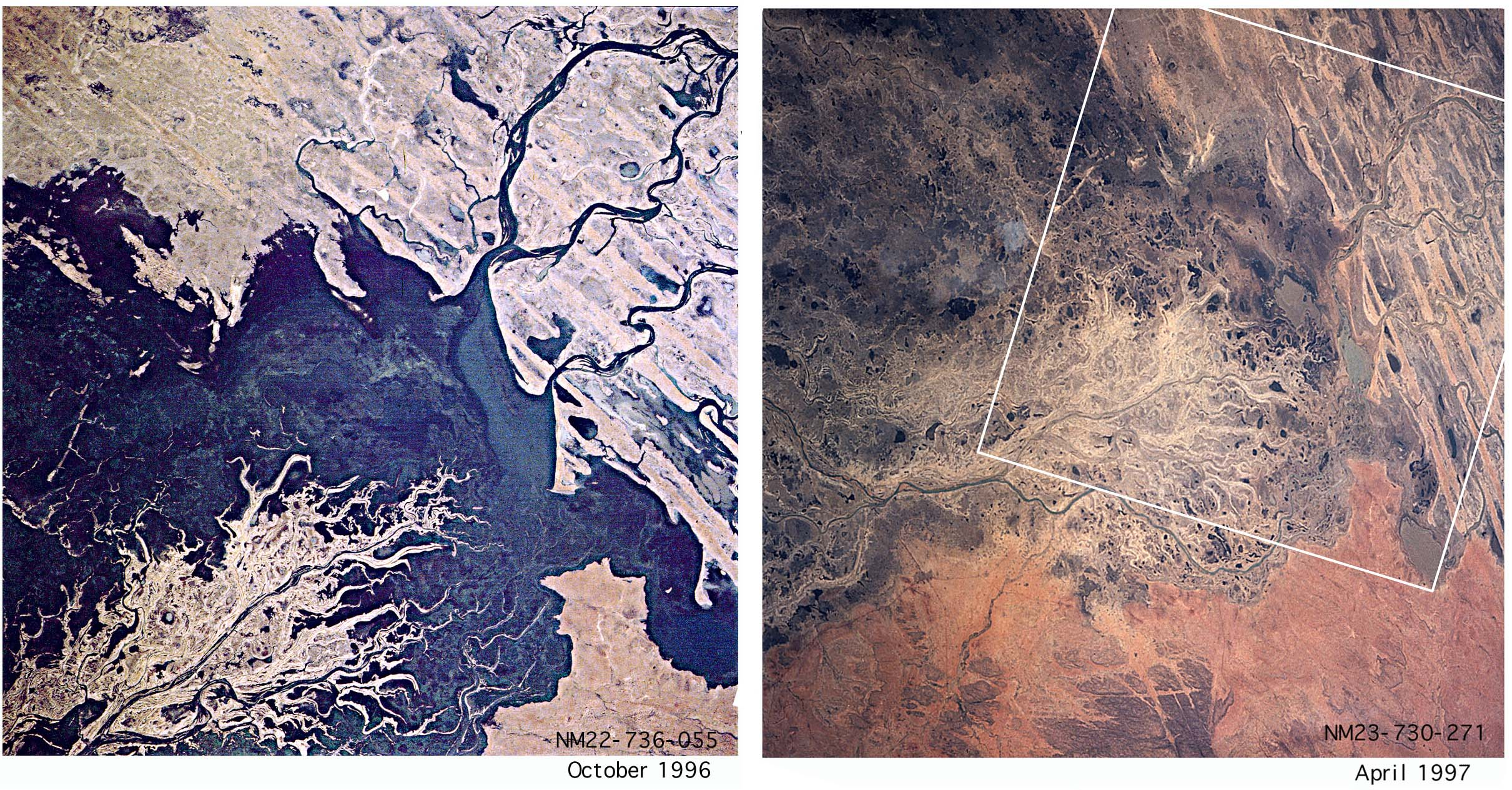
October, 1996: the dark green vegetation is lush when water from the summer rains passes through the region, causing floods. It provides a strong visual contrast with the surrounding desert countryside. By April 1997, the wetlands have dried up, and the inland delta is a uniform tan colour. The white box outlines the area covered by view.

The Niger inland Delta lies in the Sahelian zone, and has an ecosystem that is largely dependent on the amount of flooding it receives.

Precipitation in the water basins of the upper course of the Bani and Niger rivers makes for rising water levels downstream. The rising water floods varying parts of the low-level delta area, with the water rise determined by the amount of rain fallen upstream. This in turn, is influenced by the northward movement of the Intertropical Convergence Zone. A delay exists between the peak amount of precipitation and the maximum water level in the inland delta area. While the wet season lasts four months from June until September, the western and southern edges of the delta area are not flooded until early to mid-October. The consequence is that parts of the delta are flooded while the dry season is well under way. Note that only the lowest patches are flooded annually: higher elevations receive flooding in more intermittent periods due to the changing degrees of waterlevel rises. This division in roughly three zones (flooded, periodically flooded and not-periodically flooded), makes for patches that vary in their nature according to their proximity to a main body water and elevation.

In turn, this strongly affects land use in and around the inland delta, as human impact is driven by agriculture, both irrigated and rainfed, grazing and browsing of herds and flocks and the collection of wood for fuel, all dependent on the availability of water. The variable environment has led the different peoples of the delta to develop different traditional specializations, the Marka people being cultivators of rice, the Bambara growers of millet and sorghum, the Fulani and Tuareg the leading herdsmen, and the Bozo and Somono the leading fishermen, with each group keeping its own adaptations to unpredictable flooding secret from the others.

=== Flora ===
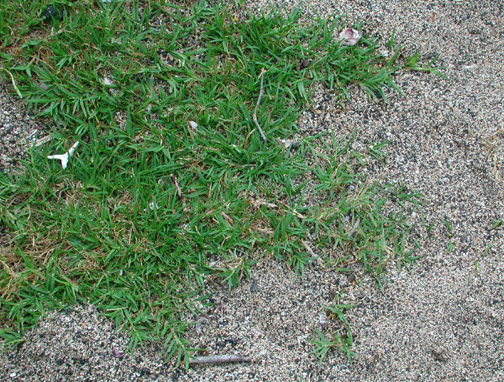
Cynodon dactylon, a grass characteristic of heavily grazed outer fringes of the Inland Delta area.

The Inland Delta forms a green oasis in its semi-arid surroundings. Its vegetation growth is limited by the availability of water, thus giving patches more often or longer subject to flooding a denser and more tree-like vegetation cover. As said, flooding cycles follow the precipitation cycle. The vegetation cycle in its turn follows the flooding cycle with a certain delay: it takes days for grasses to germinate after flooding, but months before trees die of a lack of water when floodwater has once again receded.

When classifying vegetation in a grass, shrub and tree layer, up to 80% of vegetation cover in the Sahel consists of grass. In the delta area however, water is more readily available and a larger proportion of cover consists of bushes and trees. Vegetation cover itself changes as well, reaching 100% during and shortly after the flood season. Only low lying patches near a persistent water body are vegetated year-round.

The area is not uniform: according to relief, proximity to a water body and soil type, different species exist. Roughly, three regions with characteristic species can be discerned:

Southern Delta The low-lying floodplains can sustain aquatic plants and grasses including the grasses Acroceras amplectens and Echinochloa pyramidalis, burgu millet (Echinochloa stagnina) and the lovegrass Eragrostis atrovirens.

Outer fringes - The grasslands on the edges of the watercourses, are heavily grazed. Plants include the beardgrass Andropogon gayanus, dūrvā grass Cynodon dactylon, and the thatching grass Hyparrhenia dissoluta. Along the many watercourses, Mimosa asperata and Salix chevalieri grow above a Cyperus maculatus understory.

Northern Delta Characterized by emergent sand ridges which sustain the palm trees Hyphaene thebaica and Borassus aethiopum, the gum arabic tree Acacia nilotica, Guarea senegalensis, Mimosa asperata and Ziziphus mauritiana.

=== Fauna ===
The delta is home to birds in large numbers including hundreds of thousands of wintering garganeys, pintails and ruffs and breeding colonies of cormorant, heron, spoonbill, ibis and other waterbirds including the endangered West African subspecies of black crowned crane (Balearica pavonina pavonina). Most large mammals have been removed from the area by the human population. Mammals remaining include the African manatee, known as the sea cow which lives in the rivers and feeds on underwater plants. And the rivers are rich in fish including two endemics; the Mochokidae catfish Synodontis gobroni and a cichlid, Gobiocichla wonderi.

== Threats and preservation ==
The construction of a large irrigation project upstream of the Inner Niger Delta threatens its ecology and the livelihoods of its inhabitants. The 100,000 ha project is an extension to the area irrigated by the Office du Niger through the Malibya canal. The extension, which was under construction in 2010, is financed by the Libya Africa Investment Portfolio which will also have the right to exploit the irrigated land. According to James Leten, a researcher, the project will reduce the area under deep inundation in the Inner Niger Delta by 43 percent. The area under deep inundation is crucial for pastoralists, because it is only there that Borgou (Echinochloa stagnina) grows, a plant which is particularly nutritious for cattle. Nomadic pastoralists come from as far away as Burkina Faso and Mauritania to allow their cattle to graze on the Borgou of the Inner Niger Delta. According to a report in Jeune Afrique, the researcher tried to alert the authorities about the need to find alternative livelihoods for the pastoralists, apparently without success.

Three Ramsar sites, a total of 1,620 km^{2} have been declared in the delta; Lac Horo, Lac Debo, and the Séri floodplain. But the delta is largely unprotected and at the same time fishing and farming in the delta is vital to the livelihoods of the people of Mali. Low water levels in the rivers, lack of rain, increasing human population and a break-up of the traditional tribal arrangements for sharing the resources of the delta are all factors that may contribute to severely damaging the ecosystem. In particular fishing is less regulated (in the past only two tribes were permitted to fish) and fish stocks in the rivers are declining. In a similar way lack of control is also causing over-grazing. Finally the Selingue Dam and other water control projects affect the levels and seasonal behaviour of the rivers.

== See also ==
- River delta
- Flooded grasslands and savannas
