= Germany–South Sudan relations =

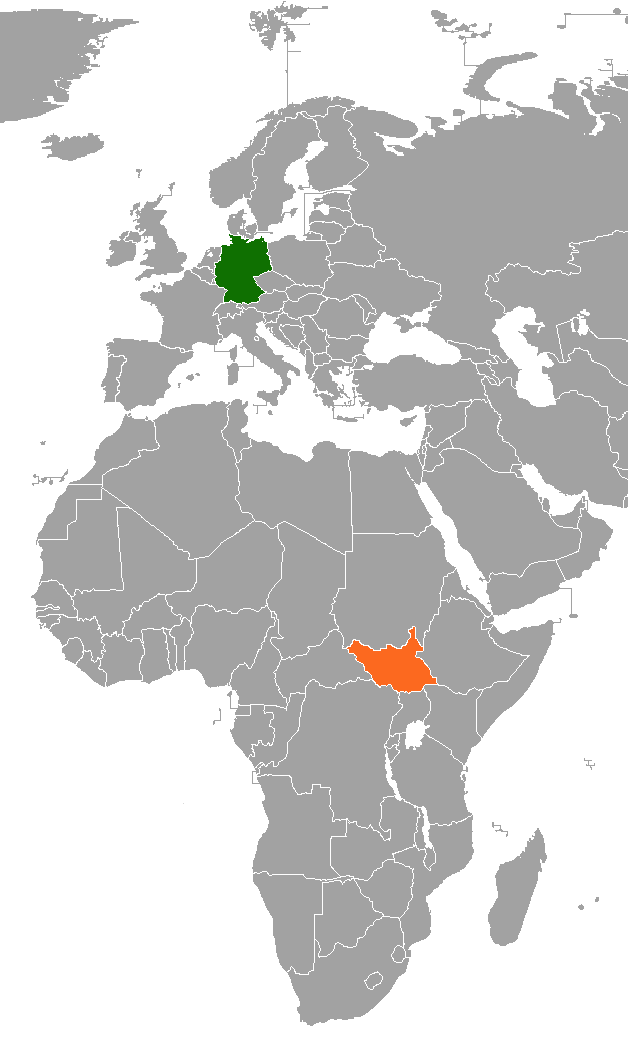

- Germany: South Sudan

Germany–South Sudan relations have existed since the independence of South Sudan in 2011. In the context of the civil war in South Sudan, the Federal Republic of Germany became an important donor of humanitarian aid to South Sudan.

== History ==
In the 19th century, several German-speaking explorers, such as Wilhelm von Harnier, Georg Schweinfurth, and Richard Buchta, traveled to what is now South Sudan. In 1878, Emin Pasha, a Silesian, was appointed governor of the province of Equatoria in the Turkish-Egyptian Sudan. He introduced new crops to the region, expanded the road system, and brought new areas under Turkish influence. He later had to flee with the Mahdi uprising. In the early 20th century, German explorers Wilhelm Banholzer and Diedrich Westermann studied the Shilluk ethnic group in South Sudan.

In 1964, photographer and filmmaker Leni Riefenstahl traveled to what was then Sudan and photographed members of the Nuba. Her photos later appeared in German illustrated magazines. In the second half of the 20th century, the Christian peoples of South Sudan waged a long-running war of independence against the Muslim Arab north. Germans like Kilian Kleinschmidt were active in UN missions in the country. In 1997, Stephan Reimund Senge founded Initiative Sudan, which provided aid in war-ravaged South Sudan.

Even before South Sudan's independence, Germany began official bilateral development cooperation with South Sudan in 2006. In 2010, the Deutsche Gesellschaft für Internationale Zusammenarbeit established an office in Juba. Following an internationally recognized independence referendum, Germany immediately recognized South Sudan's independence and established a German embassy in Juba. After the civil war began in the country, the German armed forces had to fly German citizens out of the country in 2012. Germany provided humanitarian aid and the Bundeswehr participated in the UN mission UNMISS.

Due to the poor security situation in the country, the newly established German embassy in Juba had to be evacuated in 2016. It was not closed, however, but continued to operate formally. On 22 March 2025, Germany closed its embassy as the country teetered toward civil war.

== Economic relations ==
Economic relations between Germany and South Sudan are barely developed. In 2021, the bilateral trade volume was only 8 million euros. All imports from South Sudan to Germany are duty-free and quota-free, with the exception of armaments, as part of the Everything but Arms initiative of the European Union.

== Development cooperation ==
Official development cooperation has existed since 2006, and the Gesellschaft für Internationale Zusammenarbeit has been active in the country since the 1970s. Development cooperation focuses on food security and agricultural development, water supply, and rural development and governance. In addition, Germany provides assistance to refugees.

== Diplomatic locations ==
- Germany has an embassy in Juba.
