= Bangande people =

Languages
- Bangime

Related ethnic groups
- Dogon people

The Bangande are an ethnic group indigenous to the central plateau region of Mali, in West Africa. They live in the Bangande valley, which cuts into the western edge of the Dogon high plateau, in eastern Mali.

The Bangande consider themselves to belong to the Dogon ethnicity, but other Dogon people insist they are not.

The Bangande population speaks Bangime (red), a language isolate surrounded by Dogon languages

== Language ==
The language spoken by the Bangande people is Bangime, a language isolate studied by linguists Jeff Heath and Abbie Hantgan. Even though Bangime is not related to the Dogon languages, the Bangande still consider their language to be Dogon.

== Geography ==
Linguist and anthropologist Roger Blench reports that Bangime, the language of the Bangande, is spoken in 7 villages east of Karge, near Bandiagara, Mopti Region, central Mali (Blench 2007). The villages are:

- Bara (IPA: [bara])
- Bounou (IPA: [bunu])
- Niana (IPA: [ɲana]) (also called Nani)
- Die'ni (IPA: [jene])
- Digari (IPA: [diɡarɔ]) (also called Digarou)
- Doro (IPA: [dɔrɔ])
- Due (IPA: [ʔjeni])

== Bibliography ==
- Hantgan, Abbie (2013). "An introduction to the Bangande people and Bangime phonology and morphology". Indiana University Bloomington.
- Heath, Jeffrey; Hantgan, Abbie (2018). A Grammar of Bangime. Mouton Grammar Library. doi:10.1515/9783110765212. ISBN 9783110557497. OCLC 1015349027.
