= Ambiri =

- Village
- Location in Mali
- Coordinates: 15°30′53″N 4°12′44″W
- Country: Mali
- Region: Mopti Region
- Cercle: Youwarou Cercle
- Commune: Dirma
- Time zone: UTC+0 (GMT)

Ambiri is a village and seat of the commune of Dirma in the Cercle of Youwarou in the Mopti Region of southern-central Mali.
