= Guidio-Sarre =

- Village
- Location in Mali
- Coordinates: 15°21′5″N 4°4′30″W
- Country: Mali
- Region: Mopti Region
- Cercle: Youwarou Cercle
- Commune: Deboye
- Time zone: UTC+0 (GMT)

Guidio-Sarre is a village and seat of the commune of Deboye in the Cercle of Youwarou in the Mopti Region of southern-central Mali. The village lies on the northern shore of Lake Débo.
