= Youwarou attack =

2018 armed conflict in Mali

- Part of Mali War
Date	January 25, 2018
Location	Youwarou, Mali
Result	Malian victory

Belligerents
Mali	Jama'at Nasr al-Islam wal Muslimin

Casualties and losses
2 killed 1 injured	7 killed

On January 25, 2018, jihadists from Jama'at Nasr al-Islam wal Muslimin attacked the village of Youwarou in Mali, but the attack was repelled by Malian forces.

== Background ==
Jama'at Nasr al-Islam wal Muslimin (JNIM) was formed in early 2017 as a coalition of five separate jihadist groups that initially rebelled against the Malian government in 2012. One of the group's first campaigns for loot and power was in the Mopti Region of central Mali, where Katibat Macina led by Amadou Koufa (one of the five groups making up JNIM) was most active. Thirty-six Malian soldiers in Youwarou a few weeks prior to the attack had defected from their post and fled to Bamako.

== Attack ==
The attack began at five o'clock in the morning, when unknown armed men attacked the Malian military camp in Youwarou. The battle lasted for several hours, with the Malian military releasing a statement that the military held control over the garrison.

== Aftermath ==
The Malian government stated that two soldiers were killed and one was injured in the attack, with seven jihadists killed. Weapons and supplies were also alleged to have been captured.
