= Sarre =

Sarre can refer to:

- Saarland or Sarre, a German state
- Sarre (département), a former French département, now part of Germany
- Sarre, Aosta Valley, a town in Italy
- Sarre, Kent, a village in the United Kingdom
- Sarre river or Saar, a river in France and Germany
- Sarre (Bode), a river of Saxony-Anhalt, Germany, tributary of the Bode
- La Sarre, a town in Quebec, Canada

== People with that surname ==
- Friedrich Sarre (1865–1945), German Orientalist, archaeologist and art historian
- Georges Sarre (1935–2019), French politician
- Ronald Sarre (1932–2009), Australian cricketer
- Tony Sarre, Australian filmmaker

== See also ==
- Sarre-Union, a commune of the Bas-Rhin département in Alsace, France
- Guidio-Sarre, a village in the Mopti Region of southern-central Mali
