= Kormou-Marka =

- Village
- Location in Mali
- Coordinates: 15°40′33″N 4°13′10″W
- Country: Mali
- Region: Mopti Region
- Cercle: Youwarou Cercle
- Commune: Dongo
- Time zone: UTC+0 (GMT)

Kormou-Marka is a village and seat of the commune of Dongo in the Cercle of Youwarou in the Mopti Region of southern-central Mali.
