= Gathi-Loumbo =

- Village
- Location in Mali
- Coordinates: 15°28′12″N 4°36′44″W
- Country: Mali
- Region: Mopti Region
- Cercle: Youwarou Cercle
- Commune: Farimaké
- Time zone: UTC+0 (GMT)

Gathi-Loumbo (or Gatié Loumo on some maps) is a village and seat of the commune of Farimaké in the Cercle of Youwarou in the Mopti Region of southern-central Mali.
