= Deboye =

- Commune
- Location in Mali
- Coordinates: 15°21′5″N 4°4′30″W
- Country: Mali
- Region: Mopti Region
- Cercle: Youwarou Cercle

Population (2009 census)
  - Total: 21,776
- Time zone: UTC+0 (GMT)

Deboye is a commune of the Cercle of Youwarou in the Mopti Region of Mali. The commune contains 24 small villages. The local government is based in the village of Guidio-Sarre. In 2009 the commune had a population of 21,776.
