= Bangime language =

Language isolate of southeastern Mali

Bangime
- Baŋgɛri-mɛ
- Native to: Mali
- Region: Dogon cliffs
- Ethnicity: Bangande
- Native speakers: 3,500 (2017)
- Language family: Language isolate

Language codes
- ISO 639-3: dba
- Glottolog: bang1363
- ELP: Bangime
- Bangi-me, among the Dogon languages

- Location within Mali
- Coordinates: 14.81°N 3.77°W

Bangime (/ˌbæŋɡiˈmeɪ/; bàŋɡí–mɛ̀, or, in full, Bàŋgɛ́rí-mɛ̀) is a language isolate spoken by 3,500 people in seven villages in southern Mali, who call themselves the bàŋɡá–ndɛ̀ ("hidden people").. The Bangande consider themselves to be Dogon, but other Dogon people insist they are not.

== The language ==
=== Location ===
Health and Hantgan report that Bangime is spoken in the Bangande valley, which cuts into the western edge of the Dogon high plateau in eastern Mali. Roger Blench reports that Bangime is spoken in 7 villages east of Karge, near Bandiagara, Mopti Region, central Mali (Blench 2007). The villages are:

- Bara (IPA: [bara])
- Bounou (IPA: [bunu])
- Niana (IPA: [ɲana]) (also called Nani)
- Die'ni (IPA: [jene])
- Digari (IPA: [diɡarɔ]) (also called Digarou)
- Doro (IPA: [dɔrɔ])
- Due (IPA: [ʔjeni])

=== Endangerment ===
Ethnologue classifies Bangime as 6a - Vigorous. This level is “middle of the scale” of language endangerment (EGIDS), corresponding to languages that “are not developing, but neither are they endangered since they enjoy vigorous face-to-face use in daily life by all generations.”.

=== Classification ===
Long known to be highly divergent from the (other) Dogon languages, it was first proposed as a possible isolate by Blench (2005). Jeff Heath and Abbie Hantgan have hypothesized that the cliffs surrounding the Bangande valley provided isolation of the language as well as safety for Bangande people. Even though Bangime is not related to the Dogon languages, the Bangande still consider their language to be Dogon. Hantgan and List report that Bangime speakers seem unaware that it is not mutually intelligible with any Dogon language.

Roger Blench, who discovered the language was not a Dogon language, notes:

This language contains some Niger–Congo roots but is lexically very remote from all other languages in West Africa. It is presumably the last remaining representative of the languages spoken prior to the expansion of the Dogon proper,

which he dates to 3,000–4,000 years ago.

Bangime has been characterised as an anti-language, i.e., a language that serves to prevent its speakers from being understood by outsiders, possibly associated with the Bangande villages having been a refuge for escapees from slave caravans.

Blench (2015) speculates that Bangime and Dogon languages have a substratum from a "missing" branch of Nilo-Saharan that had split off relatively early from Proto-Nilo-Saharan, and tentatively calls that branch "Plateau".

== Morphology ==
Bangime uses various morphological processes, including clitics, affixation, reduplication, compounding, and tone change. It does not use case-marking for noun phrase subjects and objects. Bangime is a largely isolating language. The only productive affixes are the plural and a diminutive, which are seen in the words for the people and language above.

=== Affixation ===
Bangime has both prefixation and suffixation. The following chart provides examples of affixation.

| Suffixation | | | | Prefixation |
|---|---|---|---|---|
| Possessor-of-X Derivative Suffix | Agentive Suffix | Causative Suffix | Pluralization Suffix | 'Thing' Prefix to Nouns |
| sjɛ̀ɛ̀ⁿ-tjɛ́ɛ́ⁿ {force, power-possessor-of-X‍ derivative} ‘soldier, policeman’ | ɲɔ̀ŋɔ̀ndɔ̀-ʃɛ̀ɛ̀ⁿ write-AGT ‘writer, scribe’ | twàà-ndà arrive-CAUS ‘deliver (message, object)’ | bùrⁿà-ndɛ́ stick-PL ‘sticks’ | kì-bɛ́ndɛ́ thing-long ‘something long, a long one’ |

=== Compounding ===
Bangime creates some words by compounding two morphemes together. A nasal linker is often inserted between the two morphemes. This linker matches the following consonant's place of articulation, with /m/ used before labials, /n/ before alveolars, and /ŋ/ before velars. Below are examples of compound words in Bangime.

tàŋà-m̀-bógó
ear-(linker)-wide
‘elephant’

náá-ḿ-bííⁿ
bush/outback-(linker)-goat
'wild goat’

=== Reduplicative compounds ===
Some compound words in Bangime are formed by full or partial reduplication. The following chart contains some examples. In the chart, v indicates a vowel (v̀ is a low tone, v̄ is a mid tone, v́ is a high tone), C indicates a consonant, and N indicates a nasal phoneme. Subscripts are used to show the reduplication of more than one vowel (v_{1} and v_{2}). The repeated segment is shown in bold. Partial reduplication is also seen alongside a change in vowel quality. The chart also displays a few examples of this.

Reduplicative Compounds in Bangime
| Reduplication Structure | Reduplication Type | Example | Loose English Translation |
|---|---|---|---|
| Cv̀Cv̀-Cv́Cɛ̀ɛ̀ | Partial | **dɔ̀r**ɔ̀-**dɔ̀r**ɛ̀ɛ̀ | 'sand fox' |
| Cv́N-CV(C)ɛ̀ɛ̀ | Partial | **bó**m-**bò**jɛ̀ɛ̀ | 'frog' |
| Cv́_{1}NCv́_{1}-N-Cv́_{2}NCɛ̀(ɛ̀) | Partial | **b**é**nd**é-ḿ-**b**á**nd**ɛ̀ɛ̀ | 'vine' |
| Cv̀N-Cv̀(C)ɛ̀ɛ̀ | Partial | **pà**m-**pàⁿ**ɛ̀ɛ̀ | 'stirring stick' |
| Cv̀Cv̀-Cv́Cv́ | Full | **jɔ̀rɔ̀**-**jɔ́rɔ́** | 'herb (Blepharis)' |
| Cv̀_{1}Cv̀_{1}-Cv́_{2}Cv̀_{2}(C)ɛ̀ | Partial | **j**ì**g**ì-**j**á**g**àjɛ̀ | 'chameleon' |
| Cv̀N-Cv́NCv̄ | Partial | **kɔ̀**ŋ-**kɔ́**mbɛ̄ | 'pied crow' |
| Cv́Cv́-NCv́Cv̀ | Partial | **tím**é-ń-**tím**ɛ́ɛ̀ | 'bush (Scoparia)' |
| Cv́_{1}Cv́_{1}-NCv́_{2}Cv̀_{2} | Partial | **k**é**r**é-ŋ́-**k**ɑ́**rⁿ**à | 'forked stick' |
| Càà-Cɛ́ɛ́ | Partial | **s**ààⁿ-**s**ɛ́ɛ́ⁿ | 'Vachellia tortilis' |
| Cìì-Cáá | Partial | **ʒ**ììⁿ-**ʒ**ááⁿ | 'tree (Mitragyna)' |
| Cìì-CáCɛ̀ɛ̀ | Partial | **ʒ**ììⁿ-**ʒ**áwⁿɛ̀ɛ̀ | 'bush (Hibiscus)' |

=== Tone changes ===
Another morphological process used in Bangime is tone changes. One example of this is that the tones on vowels denote the tense of the word. For example, keeping the same vowel but changing a high tone to a low tone changes the tense from future to imperfective 1st person singular.

| dɛ́ɛ́ cultivate.FUT ‘cultivate (future tense)’ | dɛ̀ɛ̀ cultivate.IPFV.1SG ‘I am cultivating’ |

Low tone is used for the tenses of imperfective 1st person singular, deontic, imperative singular, and perfective 3rd person singular. They are also used for perfective 3rd person singular along with an additional morpheme. High tone is used for the future tense.

== Phonology ==
=== Vowels ===
Bangime has 28 vowels. The chart below lists 7 short oral vowels, each of which can be long, nasalized, or both. All these vowel types can occur phonetically, but short nasalized vowels are sometimes allophones of oral vowels. This occurs when they are adjacent to nasalized semivowels (/wⁿ/ [w̃] and /jⁿ/ [j̃]) or /ɾⁿ/ [ɾ̃]. Long nasalized vowels are more common as phonemes than short nasalized vowels.

Vowels have an ±ATR distinction, which affects neighbouring consonants, but unusually for such systems, there is no ATR vowel harmony in Bangime.

Vowel Phonemes
| | Front | Central | Back |
|---|---|---|---|
| Close | i | | u |
| Close-mid | e | | o |
| Open-mid | ɛ | | ɔ |
| Open | | a | |

=== Consonants ===
Bangime has 22 consonant phonemes, shown in the chart below. Consonants that appear in square brackets are the IPA symbol, when different from the symbol used by A Grammar of Bangime. A superscript "n" indicates a nasalized consonant. Sounds in parentheses are either allophones or limited to use in loanwords, onomatopoeias, etc.

Consonant Phonemes
| | | Labial | Alveolar | Palato-alveolar/ Palatal | Velar | Glottal |
|---|---|---|---|---|---|---|
| Nasal | | m | n | ɲ | ŋ | |
| Stops/ Affricates | plain | p [pʰ] | t [tʰ] | (tʃ) | k [kʰ] | |
| Stops/ Affricates | voiced | b | d | dʒ | g | |
| Fricative | voiceless | (f) | s | (ʃ) | | h |
| Fricative | voiced | | (z) | ʒ | (ɣ) | |
| Sonorants | oral | (ʋ) w | ɾ | j ɥ | | |
| Sonorants | nasal | wⁿ [w̃] | ɾⁿ [ɾ̃] | jⁿ [j̃] | | |
| Lateral | | | l | | | |

NC sequences tend to drop the plosive, and often lenite to a nasalized sonorant: [búndà] ~ [búr̃a] ~ [bún] 'finish', [támbà] ~ [táw̃à] ~ [támà] 'chew'.

/b/ and /ɡ/ appear as [ʋ] and [ɣ], depending on the ATR status of the adjacent vowels.

/s/ appears as [ʃ] before non-low vowels, /t/ and /j/ as [tʃ] and [ʒ] before either of the high front vowels. /j/ is realized as [dʒ] after a nasal.

=== Tone ===
Bangime uses high, mid, and low tone levels as well as contoured tones (used in the last syllable of a word). There are three tones on moras(short syllables): high, low and rising. In addition, falling tone may occur on long (bimoraic) syllables. Syllables may also have no inherent tone. Each morpheme has a lexical tone melody of /H/, /M/, or /L/ (high, mid, or low, respectively) for level tones or /LH/, /HL/, or /ML/ for contoured tones. Nouns, adjectives, and numerals have lexical tone melodies. Terracing can also occur, giving a single level pitch to multiple words. Stem morphemes (such as nouns and verbs) may contain tonal ablaut/stem-wide tone overlays. For example, in nouns with determiners (definite or possessor), the determined form of the noun uses the opposite tone of the first tone in the lexical melody. A few examples of this process are listed in the chart below.

Tonal Ablaut in Nouns with Determiners
| Melody | Undetermined Singular | Determined Plural | Loose English Translation |
|---|---|---|---|
| /L/ | bùrⁿà | DET búrⁿá-ndɛ̀ | 'stick' |
| /LH/ | dʒɛ̀ndʒɛ́ | DET dʒɛ́ndʒɛ́-ndɛ̀ | 'crocodile' |
| /M/ | dījà | DET dìjà-ndɛ́ | 'village' |
| /ML/ | dāndì | DET dàndì-ndɛ́ | 'chilli pepper' |
| /H/ | párí | DET pàrì-ndɛ́ | 'arrow' |
| /HL/ | jáámbɛ̀ | DET jàà-ndɛ́ | 'child' |

Phrases and clauses can show tone sandhi.

=== Syllable structure ===
Bangime allows for the syllable types C onset, CC onset, and C coda, giving a syllable structure of (C)CV(C). The only consonants used as codas are the semivowels /w/ and /j/ and their corresponding nasalized phonemes. Usually, only monosyllabic words end in consonants. The following chart displays examples of these syllable types. For words with multiple syllables, syllables are separated by periods and the syllable of interest is bolded.

Syllables in Bangime
| Syllable Type | Example | Loose English Translation |
|---|---|---|
| CV | kɛ́ | 'thing' |
| CCV | bɔ̀.**mbɔ̀**.rɔ̀ | 'hat' |
| CVC | dèj | 'grain' |

== Syntax ==
=== Basic word order ===
The subject noun phrase is always clause-initial in Bangime, apart from some clause-initial particles. In simple transitive sentences, SOV (subject, object, verb) word order is used for the present tense, imperfective and SVO (subject, verb, object) word order is used for the past tense, perfective.

=== Examples of SOV word order ===
S . . . O . V
séédù [∅ dà] [ā būrⁿà] [ŋ̀ kùmbò]
S [3SG IPFV] [DEF stick] [3SG look.for.IPFV]
'Seydou is looking for the stick'

S . . . O . V
séédù [∅ dà] [à dwàà] [ŋ̀ sɛ̀gɛ̀ɛ̀]
S [3SG IPFV] [DEF tree] [3SG tilt.IPFV]
'Seydou is tilting the tree'

S . O . V
[ŋ̀ bé] [làkírí] [ŋ̄ dìjà]
[1SG NEG] [couscous] [1SG eat.IPFV]
'I don't eat couscous'

=== Examples of SVO word order ===
S . V O
séédù [∅ màà-rā] kūwò
S [3SG build.PFV1] house
'Seydou built a house'

S V . O
[ŋ̀ dʒíí-ndì] [à jāāmbɛ̀]
[1SG eat-CAUS.PFV2] [DEF child]
'I fed/nourished the child'

S V . O
[ŋ̀ dɛ́gù] [à kūrɛ̄ɛ̀]
[1SG hit.PFV2] [DEF dog]
'I hit the dog'

S . . V . . O
[∅ kóó] [ŋ́ jāgà] [∅ màā kwāà]
[3SG PFV] [3SG cut.PFV1] [3SG POSS neck]
'He cut her throat'

S . V O
bīīⁿ-ndɛ̄ [∅ tām-bā] nīì
goat.PL [3PL bite.PFV1] 3PL
'Some goats bit them'

=== Intransitive sentences ===
. S . . . V
[à bùrⁿà-ndɛ̀] [∅ kóó] [ŋ́ kɔ̄ndɔ̀]
[DEF stick-PL] [3PL PFV] [3PL break.PFV2]
'The sticks broke'

. S . . . V . .
[à jìbɛ̀-ndɛ́] [∅ kóó] [ŋ́ ʃààkā] [∅ wāj̀]
[DEF person-PL] [3PL PFV] [3PL disperse] [3PL RSLT]
'The people dispersed'

S . . . V
jɛ̀-tɔ́-sì [∅ bè] [∅ nóó]
nobody [3SG NEG] [3SG come.PFV]
'Nobody came'

S . . . V
bùrⁿā [∅ dà] [∅ kɔ̄-rⁿɔ̀]
stick [3SG IPFV] [3SG snap.IPFV]
'A stick is snapping'

=== Word order in phrases ===
Below are some examples of word order in various phrases.

DETERMINER + NOUN PHRASE

DET NP
à kòròŋgò
DEF donkey
'the donkey'

POSSESSOR + POSSESSEE

. Possessor . Possessee
à jààmbɛ̀ màà nàà
DEF child POSS cow
'the child's cow'

NOUN PHRASE + ADPOSITION

[ NP] Adposition
[ā būwò] kō
[DEF field] in
'in the field'

=== Focalization ===
Bangime allows for the focalization of noun phrases, prepositional phrases, adverbs, and verbs.

==== Verb focalization ====
gìgɛ̀ndì [ŋ̀ dá] [ŋ́ gìjɛ̀ndɛ̀]
sweep.VblN [1SG IPFV] [1SG sweep.Deon]
'Sweep(ing) [focus] is what I am doing/what I did'

==== Noun phrase focalization (Nonsubject) ====
séédù mí [ŋ́ dɛ̄gɛ̀]
Seydou 1SG.O [3SG hit.PFV1]
'It was me [focus] that I Seydou hit'

==== Noun phrase focalization (Demonstrative) ====
séédù kā [ŋ̄ dījà]
S Dem [3SG eat.PFV1]
'That [focus] is what Seydou ate'

==== Noun phrase focalization (Subject) ====
séédù [ŋ̀ wóré]
S [FOC go.PFV1]
'It was Seydou [focus] who went'

==== Adverbial focalization ====
ŋìjɛ̀ [ŋ̀ máá-rà] [à kùwò]
yesterday [1SG build.IPFV1] [DEF house]
'It was yesterday [focus] that I built the house'

==== Prepositional phrase focalization ====
[kā kò] [∅ ná] [ŋ́ dɛ̀ɛ̀]
[Dem with] [1SG IPFV] [1SG cultivate.IPFV]
'It's with that [focus] that I farm'

=== Polar interrogatives ===
Bangime uses [à], a clause-final particle, after a statement to make it a yes/no question. This particle is glossed with a Q. Below are some examples.

[kúúⁿ ŋ́-kò] [à wóré] à
[market Link-in] [2SG go.PFV1] Q
'Was it to the market [focus] that you-Sg went?'

séédù à
S Q
"Is it Seydou?'

[ŋ̀ núú] má à
[1SG come.PFV2] here Q
'Did I come here?'

=== Wh-questions ===
Wh-words are focalized in Bangime. Below are some examples for these interrogatives.

já má [∅ wóré]
who SFoc.IPFV [FOC go.IPFV]
'Who will go?'

já à
who Q
'Who is it?'

nɛ́-sìⁿ [∅ tí-wɔ́]
what [FOC fall.PFV1]
'What fell?'

kà nɛ́-sìⁿ
Dem what
'What is that?'

kótè [∅ nā] [∅ wōré]
where [3SG IPFV] [3SG go.IPFV]
'Where is he/she going?'

=== Particles ===
==== Topic particle ====
The topic particle is [hɔ̀ɔ̀ⁿ] and this morpheme follows a noun phrase. The following example shows a topical constituent preceding a clause.

[nɛ̀ hɔ̀ɔ̄ⁿ] nɛ̀ [∅ bè] [∅ wóré]
[1PL TOP] 1PL [1PL NEG] [1PL go.IPFV]
'As for us, we aren't going'

==== "Only" particle ====
The morpheme [pàw] can mean either 'all' or 'only.' The following example shows this morpheme as an 'only' quantifier.

[ŋ̀ tí-jè] pàw
[1SG sit.PFV2] only
'I merely sat down'

== See also ==
- Bangime word list (Wiktionary)
