= Edme-François Jomard =

French cartographer, engineer and archaeologist (1777–1862)

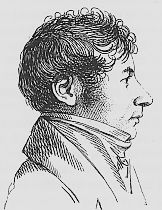
Edme-François Jomard

Edme-François Jomard (French: [ʒɔmaʁ]; 1777 – September 22, 1862) was a French cartographer, engineer, and archaeologist. He edited the Description de L'Égypte and was a member of the Institut d'Egypte established by Napoleon. He supervised the educational and cultural mission sent to France from Egypt by Muhammad Ali of Egypt. He was a pioneer in the area of History of Cartography.

== Life ==
He was educated at the collège Mazarin, the École nationale des ponts et chaussées and the École polytechnique. He took part in Napoleon's commission to Egypt. In 1828 he was appointed as curator of the geographical collections of the Bibliothèque royale.

== Description de l'Égypte ==
The publication of the landmark, outsized Description de l'Égypte (Description of Egypt) was decreed by Napoleon Bonaparte in 1802, and published between 1809 and 1892. This seminal publication on Egyptology was a collaboration effort of some 150 prominent French scientist and scholars and 2,000 technicians and artists, with Jomard as chief editor. It is the record of Bonaparte's Commission des Sciences et des Arts that accompanied the ill-fated French campaign in Egypt and Syria (1798-1801)."

== Monuments de la géographie ==
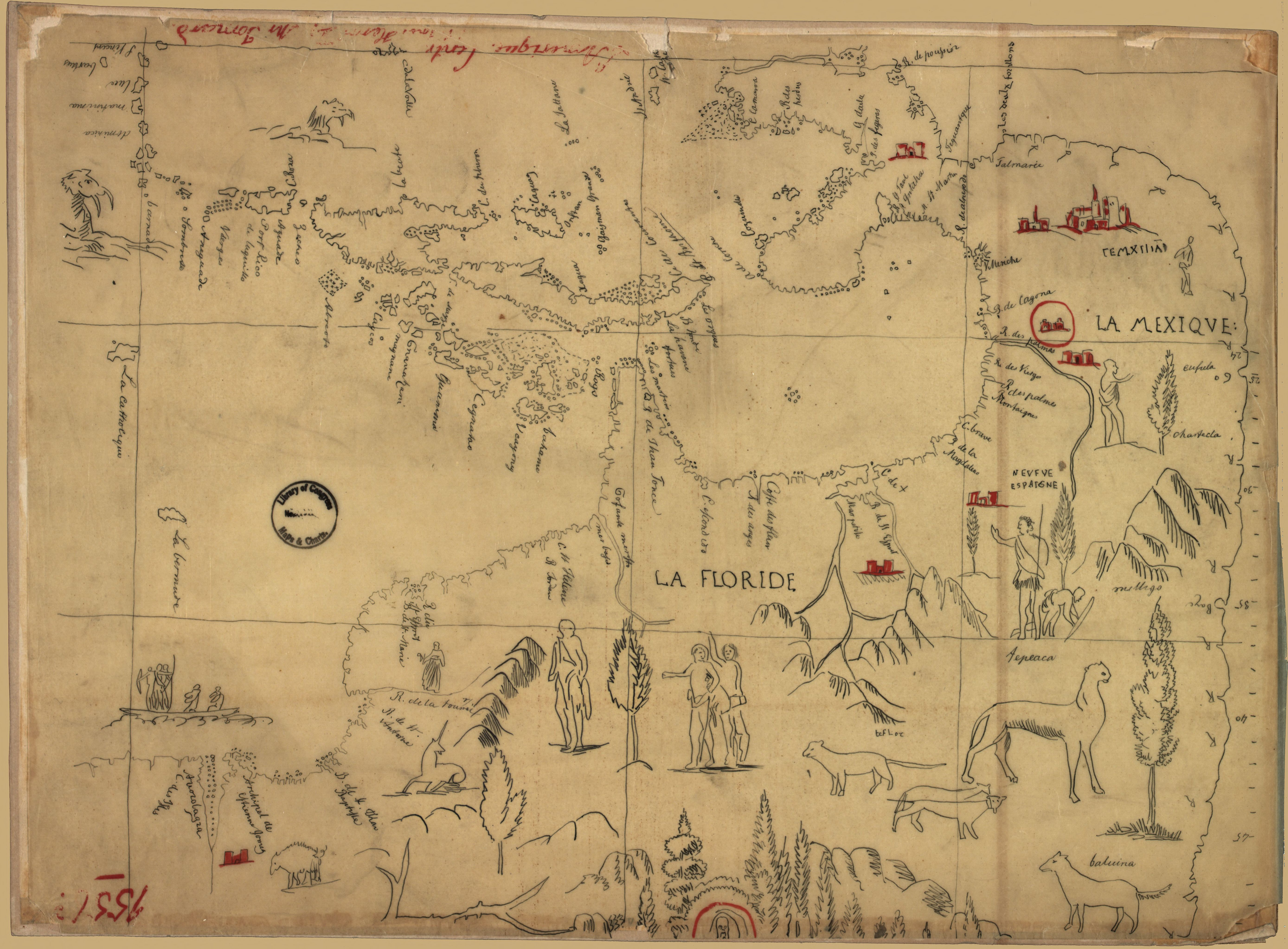
1542 map of Central America, facsimile published in Monuments de la géographie

Jomard's main task as curator at the Bibliothèque royale was to organize the existing collections and to develop the library's collection of contemporary maps. But he was also concerned with the history of cartography, searching for early maps and arranging for facsimiles to be prepared that could be published, thus making them available for scholarly study. The maps ranged from the Hereford Mappa Mundi of about 1300 to early maps of the Americas (16th century). They were prepared at full size, some maps requiring multiple folio sheets. The collection, entitled Monuments de la géographie (Monuments of geography) was published between 1842 and 1862, and included 30 maps. The goal was to document the progress of geographical concepts from erroneous mediaeval ideas to modern scientific knowledge based on exploration and accurate observation.

== Learned Societies ==
Jomard was one of the founding members of the Société de Géographie in Paris. With the Irish exile and former American consul David Baillie Warden, Jonard was behind the society's patronage of studies of indigenous America, especially Palenque and the Yucatán Peninsula.

Through his membership of the society, he was also involved in awarding the French explorer, René Caillié, the 10,000 Franc prize for being the first European to return from Timbuktu. He contributed to, and edited, Caillié's account of his travels, Journal d'un voyage à Temboctou et à Jenné dans l'Afrique Centrale, ... which was published in 1830. The work was translated into English and published as Travels through Central Africa to Timbuctoo; and across the Great Desert, to Morocco,....

Jomard was elected a member of the American Philosophical Society in 1829 and the American Antiquarian Society in 1855.

== Jomard Award ==
The Jomard Award was established by the Société de Géographie in 1882 for auxiliary sciences and services provided to the French Geographical Society ("Prix pour les sciences auxiliares et pour services rendus á la Société de Géographie").

=== Recipients ===
- 1999 The Royal Geographical Society: Archives de la Royal Geographical Society
- 2000 Christophe and Oriane Cordonnier: Le Cosmos, d'Alexandre de Humboldt
- 2005 Yves Lassus: Jomard, le dernier Egyptien
- 2009 Gilles Lapouge: La légende de la géographie

== See also ==
- List of Egyptologists

== Sources ==
- Quella-Villéger, Alain (2012), René Caillié, l'Africain : une vie d'explorateur, 1799-1838 (in French), Anglet, France: Aubéron, ISBN 978-2-84498-137-0
