= Dirma =

- Commune
- Location in Mali
- Coordinates: 15°30′53″N 4°12′44″W
- Country: Mali
- Region: Mopti Region
- Cercle: Youwarou Cercle

Area
  - Total: 699.4 km^{2} (270.0 sq mi)

Population (2009 census)
  - Total: 8,121
  - Density: 11.61/km^{2} (30.07/sq mi)
- Time zone: UTC+0 (GMT)

Dirma is a commune of the Cercle of Youwarou in the Mopti Region of Mali. The main village (chef-lieu) is Ambiri. In 2009 the commune had a population of 8,121.
