= Kilian Kleinschmidt =

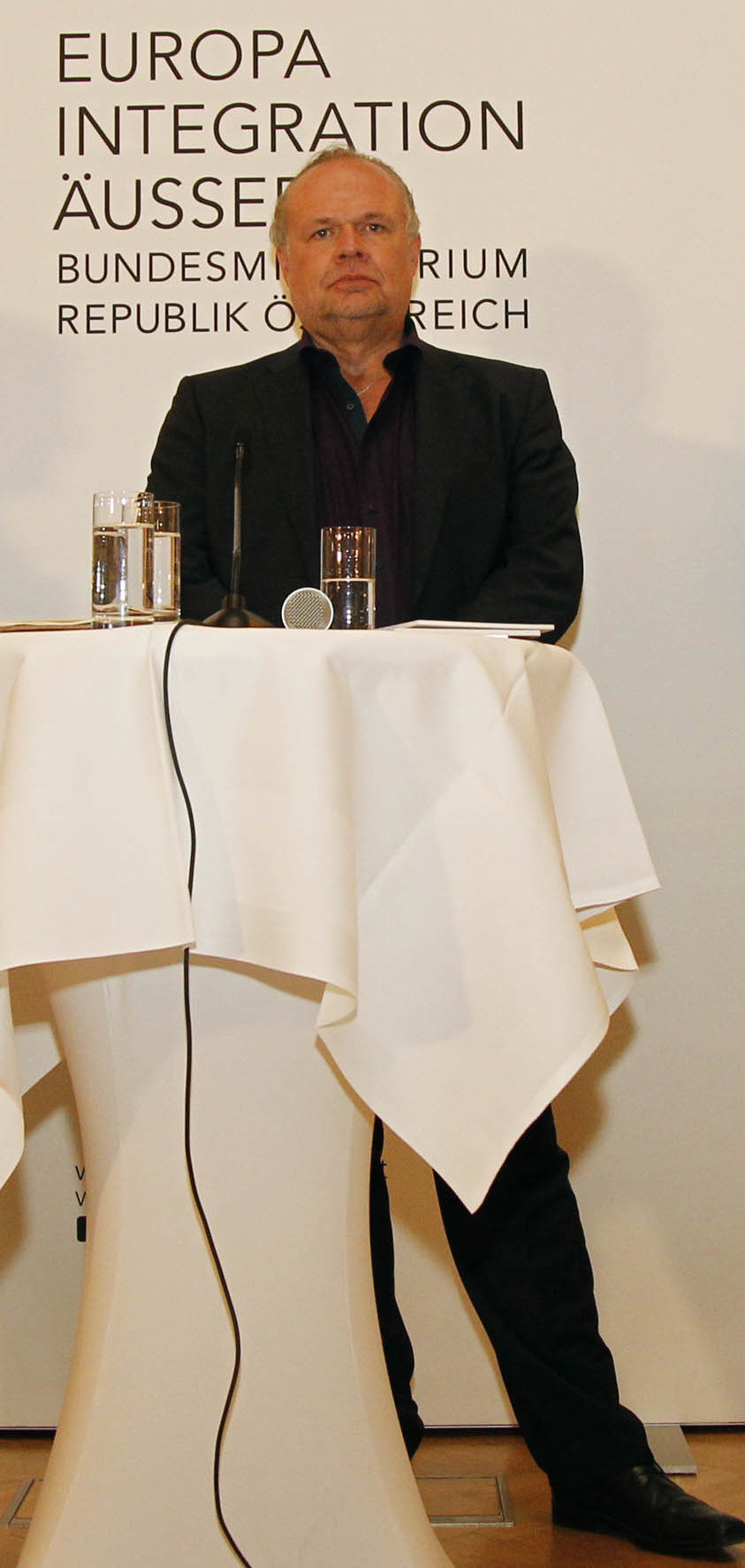
- Born: Essen, West Germany
- Occupations: Director, Switxboard

Kilian Kleinschmidt (born 1962 in Essen, West Germany) is a German entrepreneur and former UNHCR official who served as the director of the Zaatari refugee camp.

== Personal life ==
Kleinschmidt was born in Essen, West Germany as the son of teachers, and grew up in Berlin. After taking his A-Levels, he worked as a roofer. He then joined a cooperative that raised 35 goats in the Pyrenees to make cheese. At 26, during a motorcycle trip in Mali, he met an aid worker and helped out to build a school in Youvarou. He subsequently went on to be associated with UN aid agencies in different capacities. He has five biological children from three relationships and currently resides in Tunis, Tunisia .

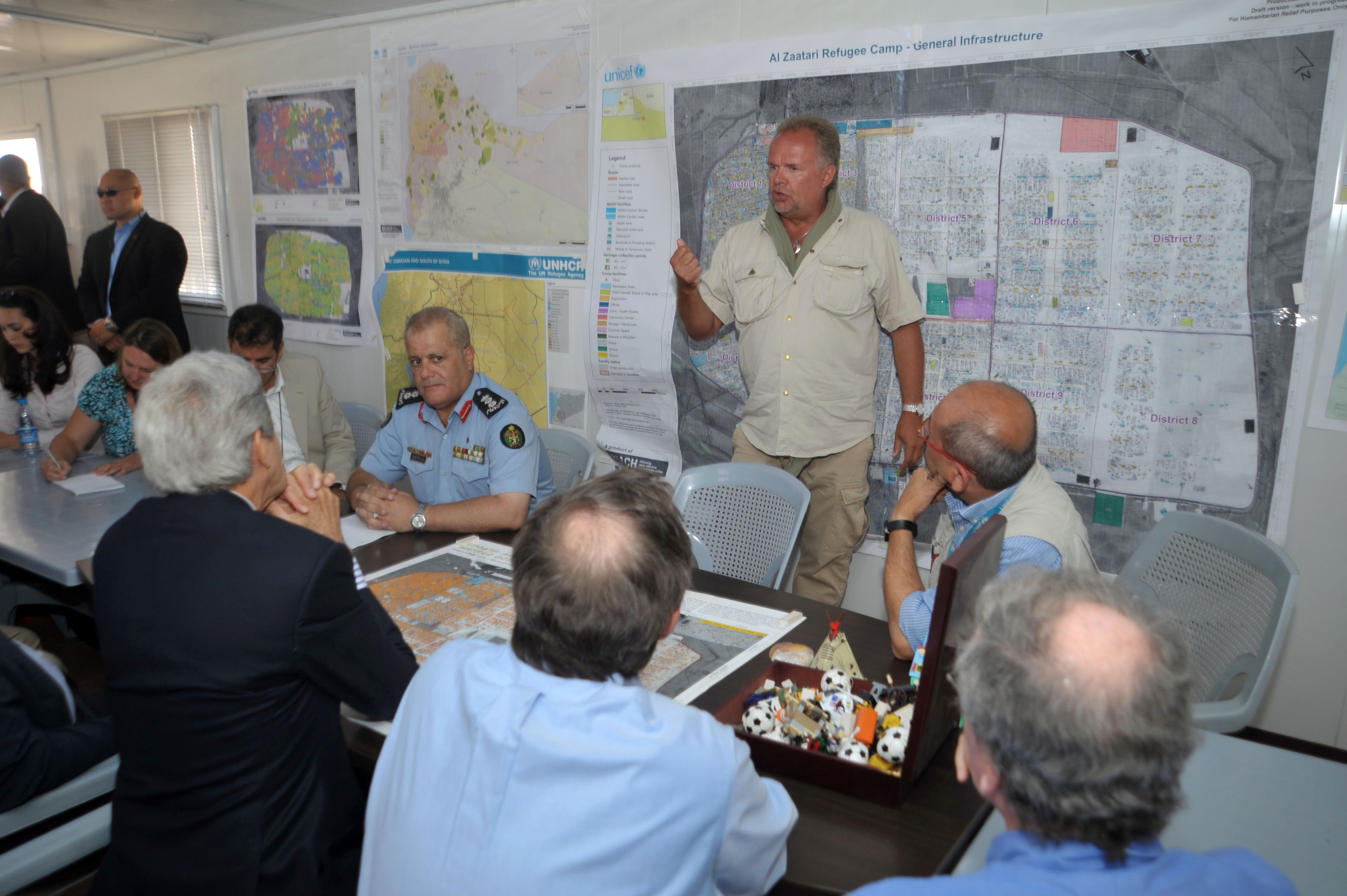
Kleinschmidt briefing John Kerry at Zataari

== Career ==
He worked in Sudan during the Second Sudanese Civil War and helped organise a camp for the Lost Boys of Sudan. He was in Mogadishu in 1993 during the Battle of Mogadishu. He spent two years in Sri Lanka as a liaison to the Liberation Tigers of Tamil Eelam rebels. He also coordinated the rescue of Rwandan Hutu refugees caught in the rain forests of Congo in 1997 for UNHCR. He repaired an old railroad built by the Belgians, and used a train powered by a steam locomotive to rescue many of the refugees. He has also worked as the Deputy UNHCR representative in Kenya and deputy to the Special Envoy of the UN Secretary General for assistance to Pakistan.

He took over as the 'Senior Field Coordinator' for UNHCR at the Zaatari refugee camp on March 12, 2013 following a series of temporary camp directors. He was tasked with restoring order in the second largest refugee camp in the world. After a 25-year stint with the UN, he founded his own aid consultancy called Switxboard. He also serves as a consultant on refugee matters to the Austrian Ministry of the Interior.
