= Dongo, Mali =

Dongo
- Commune
- Location in Mali
- Coordinates: 15°40′33″N 4°13′10″W
- Country: Mali
- Region: Mopti Region
- Cercle: Youwarou Cercle

Area
  - Total: 339 km^{2} (131 sq mi)

Population (2009 census)
  - Total: 11,421
  - Density: 33.7/km^{2} (87.3/sq mi)
- Time zone: UTC+0 (GMT)

Dongo is a commune of the Cercle of Youwarou in the Mopti Region of Mali. The principal village lies at Kormou-Marka. In 2009 the commune had a population of 11,421.
