= Dogo, Mopti =

Dogo Doro
- Village
- Location in Mali
- Coordinates: 15°10′3″N 4°25′52″W
- Country: Mali
- Region: Mopti Region
- Cercle: Youwarou Cercle
- Commune: Bimbéré Tama
- Time zone: UTC+0 (GMT)

Dogo or Doro (Dɔ́rɔ́) is a village and administrative centre (chef-lieu) of the commune of Bimbéré Tama in the Cercle of Youwarou in the Mopti Region of southern-central Mali.

Dogo village is situated on the lower slope of a mountain overlooking a narrow valley with borassus palms and Vitex. Farming, herding, and gardening (tobacco and other crops) are the main economic activities. Bangime, a language isolate, is spoken in Dogo. Local surnames are Katile, Bore, Bamani, and Guindo.
