= N'Dodjiga =

- Commune
- Location in Mali
- Coordinates: 15°37′33″N 4°2′56″W
- Country: Mali
- Region: Mopti Region
- Cercle: Youwarou Cercle

Area
  - Total: 823 km^{2} (318 sq mi)

Population (2009 census)
  - Total: 22,326
  - Density: 27.1/km^{2} (70.3/sq mi)
- Time zone: UTC+0 (GMT)

N'Dodjiga is a commune of the Cercle of Youwarou in the Mopti Region of Mali. The commune contains about 50 small villages. The main village (chef-lieu) is Sah. In 2009, the commune had a population of 22,326.
