= Bimbéré Tama =

- Commune
- Location in Mali
- Coordinates: 15°10′3″N 4°25′52″W
- Country: Mali
- Region: Mopti Region
- Cercle: Youwarou Cercle

Population (2009 census)
  - Total: 8,209
- Time zone: UTC+0 (GMT)

Bimbéré Tama is a commune of the Cercle of Youwarou in the Mopti Region of Mali. The main village (chef-lieu) is Dogo. In 2009 the commune had a population of 8,209.
