= Amélie Legrand de Saint-Aubin =

French painter

- Born: Louise Jeanne Amélie Legrand; 19 October 1797; 11th arrondissement of Paris, France
- Died: 3 October 1878 (aged 80); 5th arrondissement of Paris, France
- Education: Pupil of Charles Meynier
- Occupation: Painter
- Notable work: Portrait of René Caillié, Studio's interior

Amélie Legrand de Saint-Aubin (19 October 1797 – 3 October 1878) was a French painter. She exhibited portraits, religious scenes and history paintings at the Salon from 1819 to 1850.

== Biography ==
Born in Paris, rue d'Enfer in the Île de la Cité, on 19 October 1797, Louise Jeanne Amélie Legrand, known as Legrand de Saint-Aubin, is the eldest daughter of Pierre Jean Hilaire Legrand known as Legrand de Saint-Aubin (1772–1839), head of direct contributions, (Note: In France, direct contributions are a set of four taxes, known as the four old taxes, established under the French Revolution from 1791, the date on which all indirect taxes were abolished. These four contributions are all direct taxes without having the name, the term contribution referring more to an idea of a civic and consented gesture. It is a desire to break the very unpopular tax system of the Ancien Régime and make it more egalitarian.) and his wife Denise Marie Claudine Legrand (1772–1855).

She studied painting with Charles Meynier in the 1810s. In her workshop located at the Sorbonne, she worked alongside, among others, Louise Hersent (1784–1862), Aimée Brune-Pagès (1803–1866) and Jenny Larivière (1801–1885). She exhibited for the first time at the Salon in Paris in 1819 and, until 1850, sent to this exhibition nearly thirty paintings of religious painting, history and portraits.

She died unmarried at the age of 80 on 3 October 1878, at her home in the 5th arrondissement of Paris. She was buried the next day in the Montparnasse cemetery; her concession was recovered by the town hall in 1957 and her remains were then transferred to the ossuary of the Père-Lachaise cemetery.

== Works ==
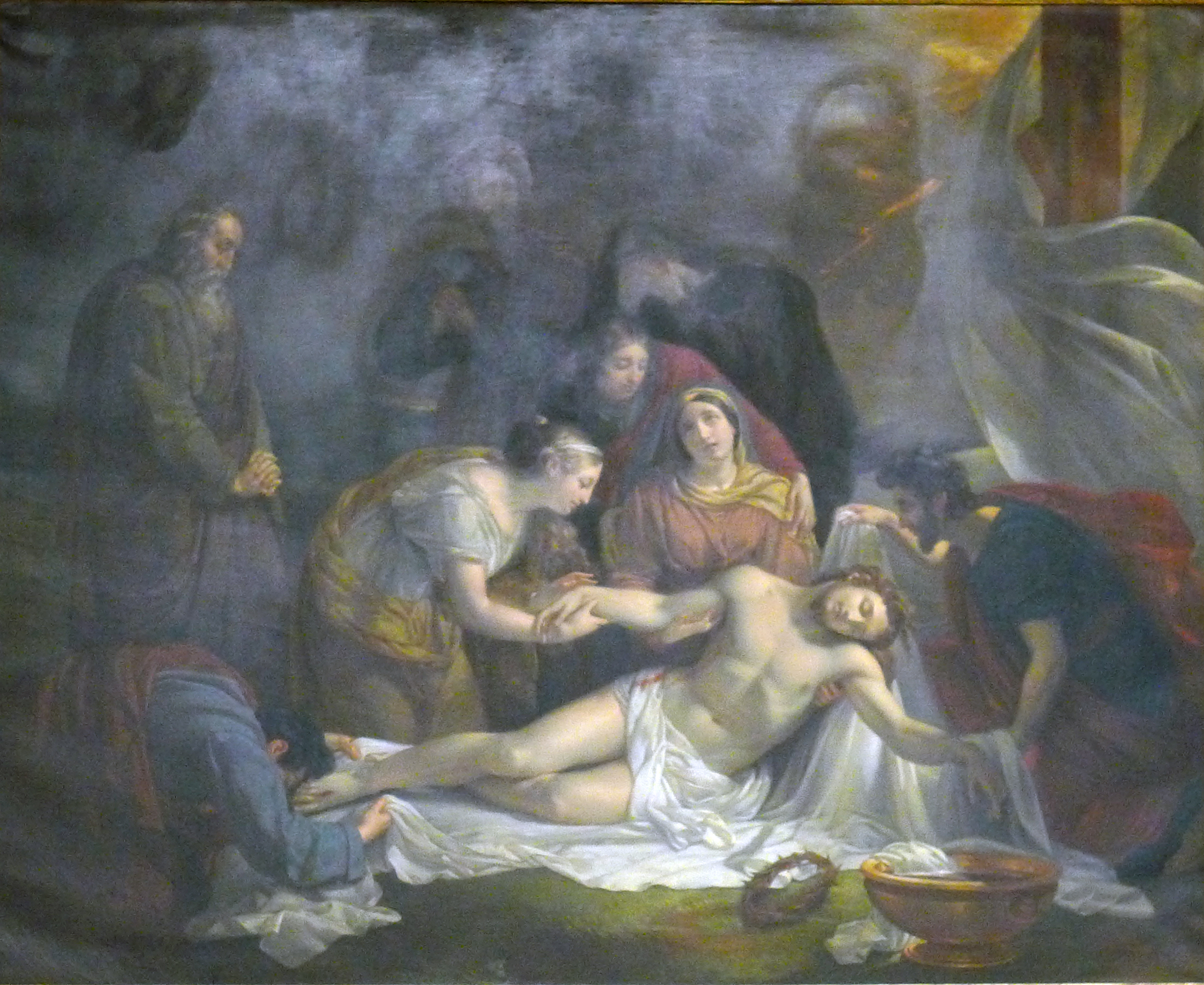
Deposition of the cross, 1827 (Paris, Saint-Étienne-du-Mont)

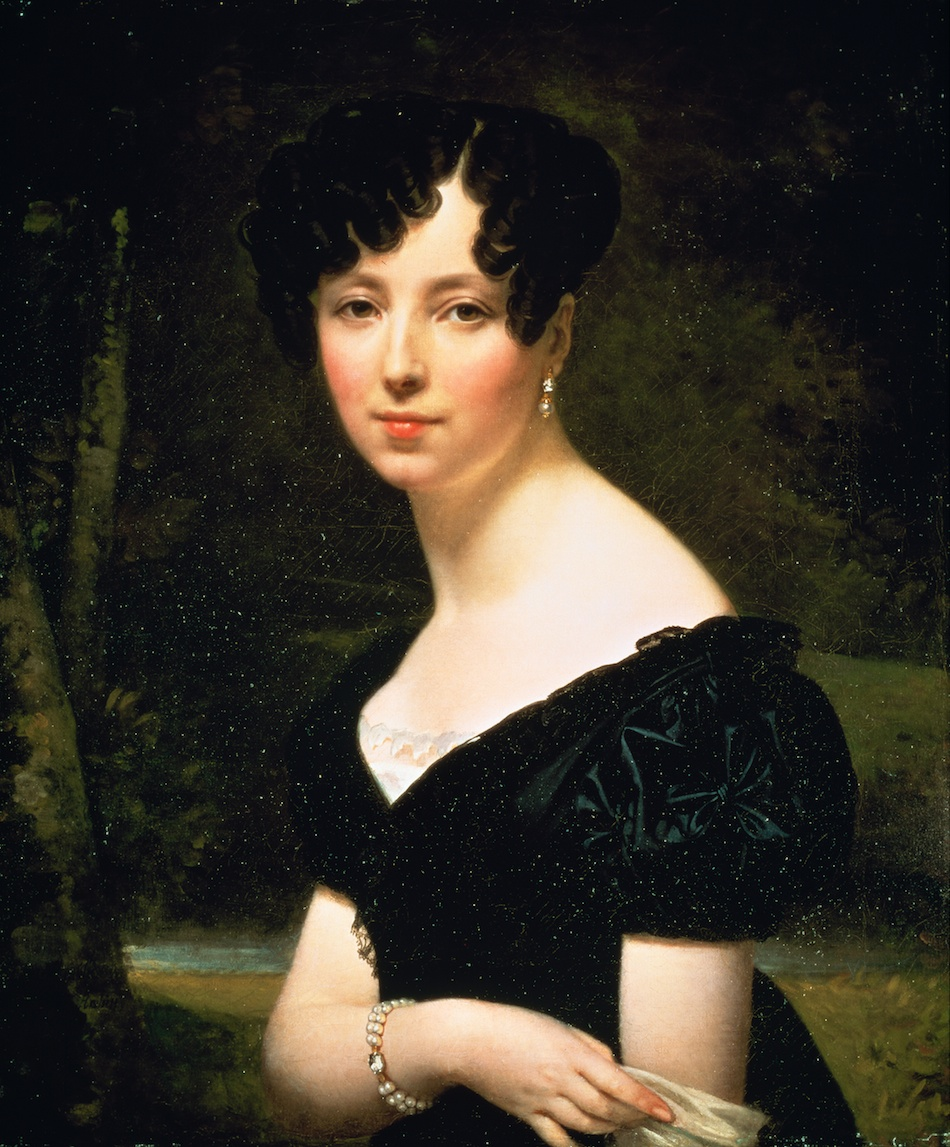
Portrait of a Lady, said to be Micaela Almonester, Baroness de Pontalba (1795-1874), 1828 (Tokyo Fuji Art Museum)

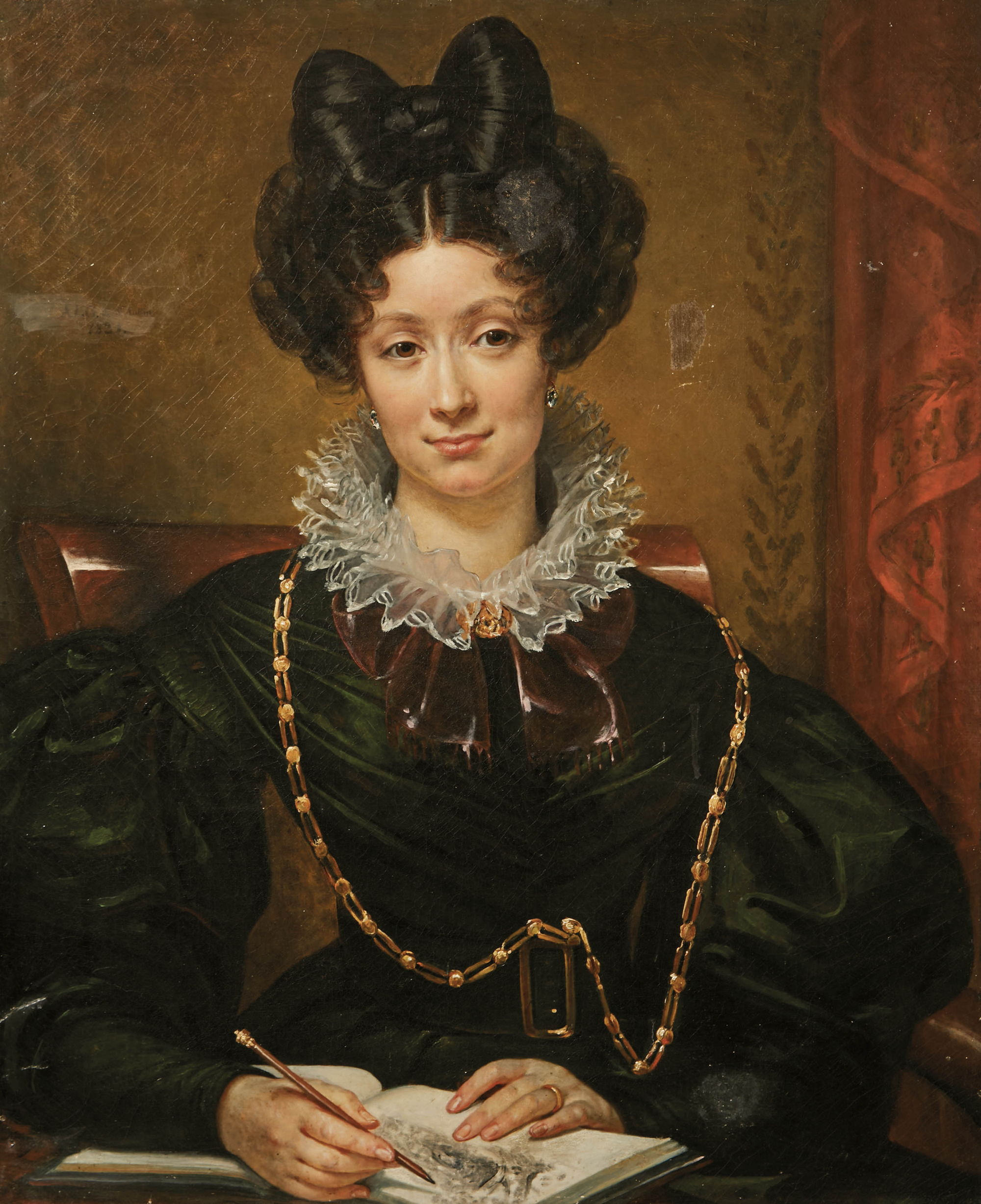
Portrait of a young artist drawing a landscape in her sketchbook, 1831 (Art Gallery of Ontario

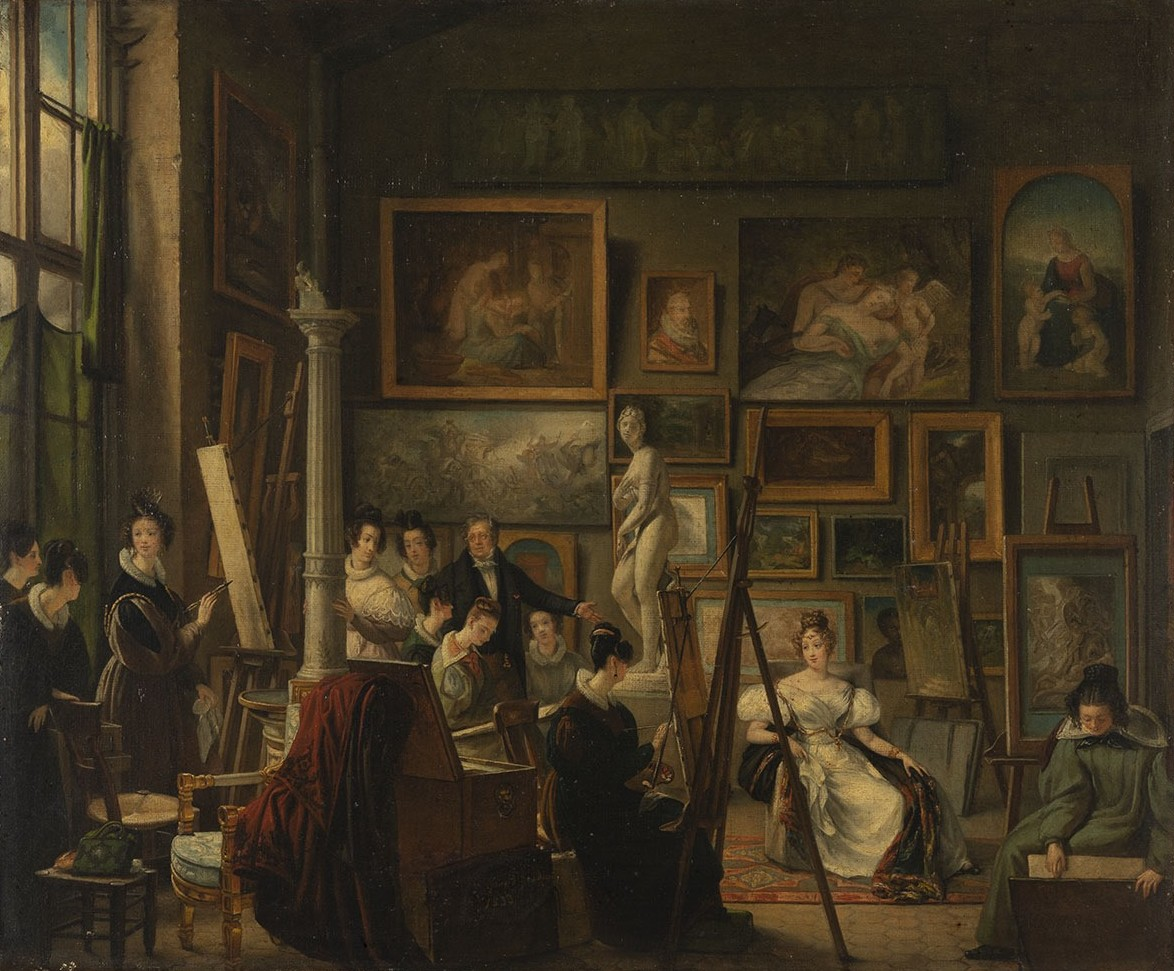
Studio's interior, a.k.a. The Artist's Studio, 1833 (Musée des Beaux-Arts de Caen)

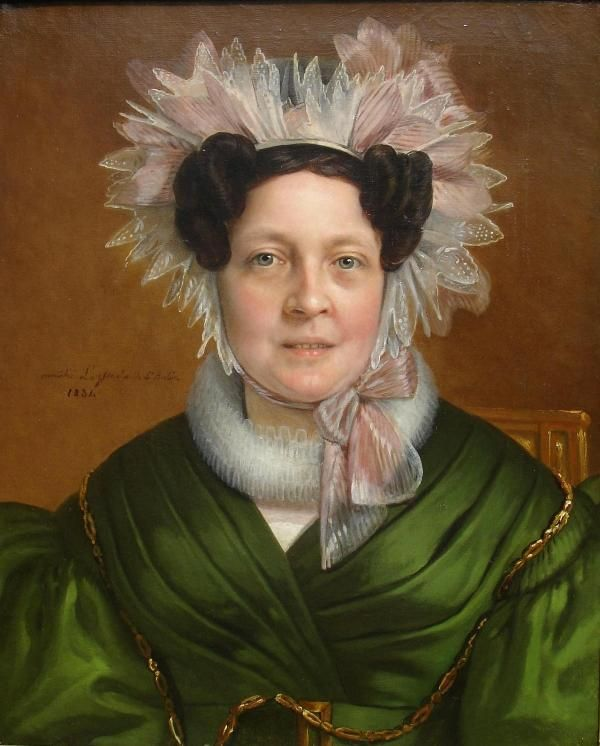
Presumed portrait of Baronne Lepic, 1834 (private collection)

== Sources ==
- Bellier de La Chavignerie, Émile; Auvray, Louis (1882). "Legrand-de-Saint-Aubin (Mlle. Amélie)". Dictionnaire général des artistes de l'École française depuis l'origine des arts du dessin jusqu'à nos jours (in French). Vol. 1. Paris: Librairie Renouard. pp. 976–977.
