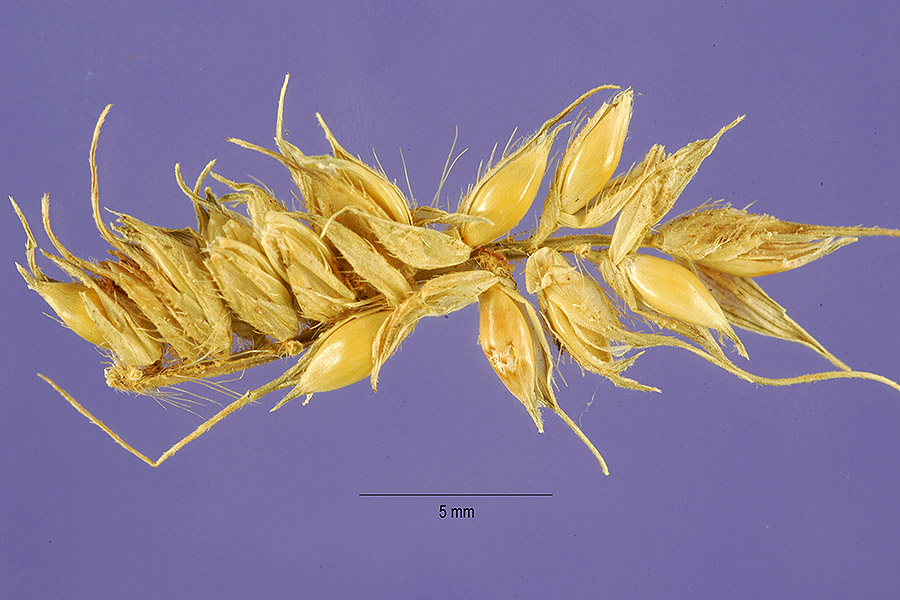
- Seeds of Echinochloa stagnina

Scientific classification
- Kingdom: Plantae
- Clade: Tracheophytes
- Clade: Angiosperms
- Clade: Monocots
- Clade: Commelinids
- Order: Poales
- Family: Poaceae
- Subfamily: Panicoideae
- Genus: Echinochloa
- Species: E. stagnina

Binomial name
- Echinochloa stagnina (Retz.) P.Beauv.

= Echinochloa stagnina =

Species of plant

Echinochloa stagnina (Burgu millet, bourgou, hippo grass) is a species of Echinochloa widespread in tropical Africa and Asia, with an invasive status in many Pacific islands. It was once one of the major grasses cultivated in the Inner Niger Delta of the Niger River. It was cultivated by the Fulani people, who used the seeds as food, and to make both alcoholic and nonalcoholic beverages.

It tolerates floods well, and has been replanted in Africa, where it has helped to control erosion and provides hay for animals. A traditional food plant in Africa, this little-known grain has potential to improve nutrition, boost food security, foster rural development and support sustainable landcare.

== Local names ==
- Fula: burgu
- Laotian: ປ້ອງ [pɔ̂ːŋ].
