= Lake Débo =

Lake in Mali

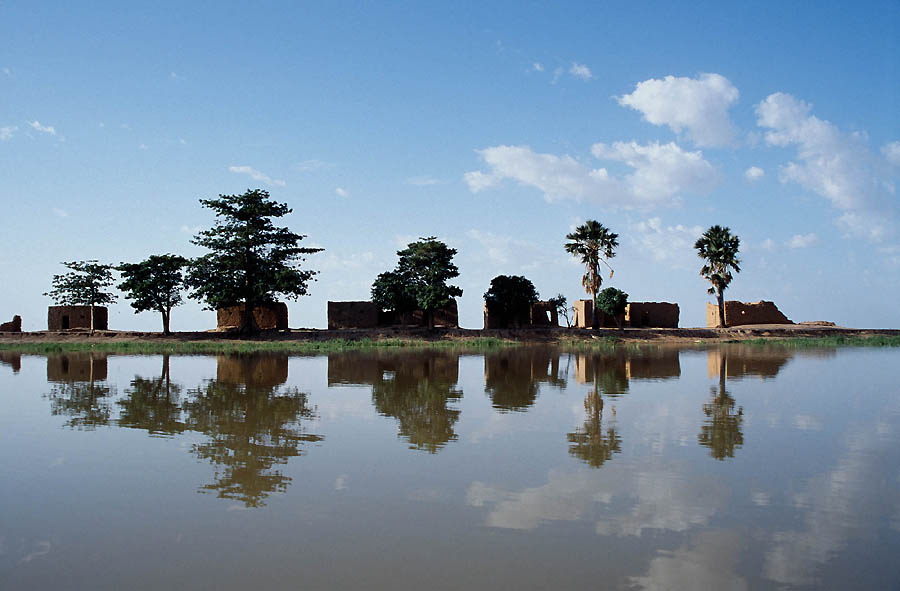
- Mud houses on the center island at Lake Débo

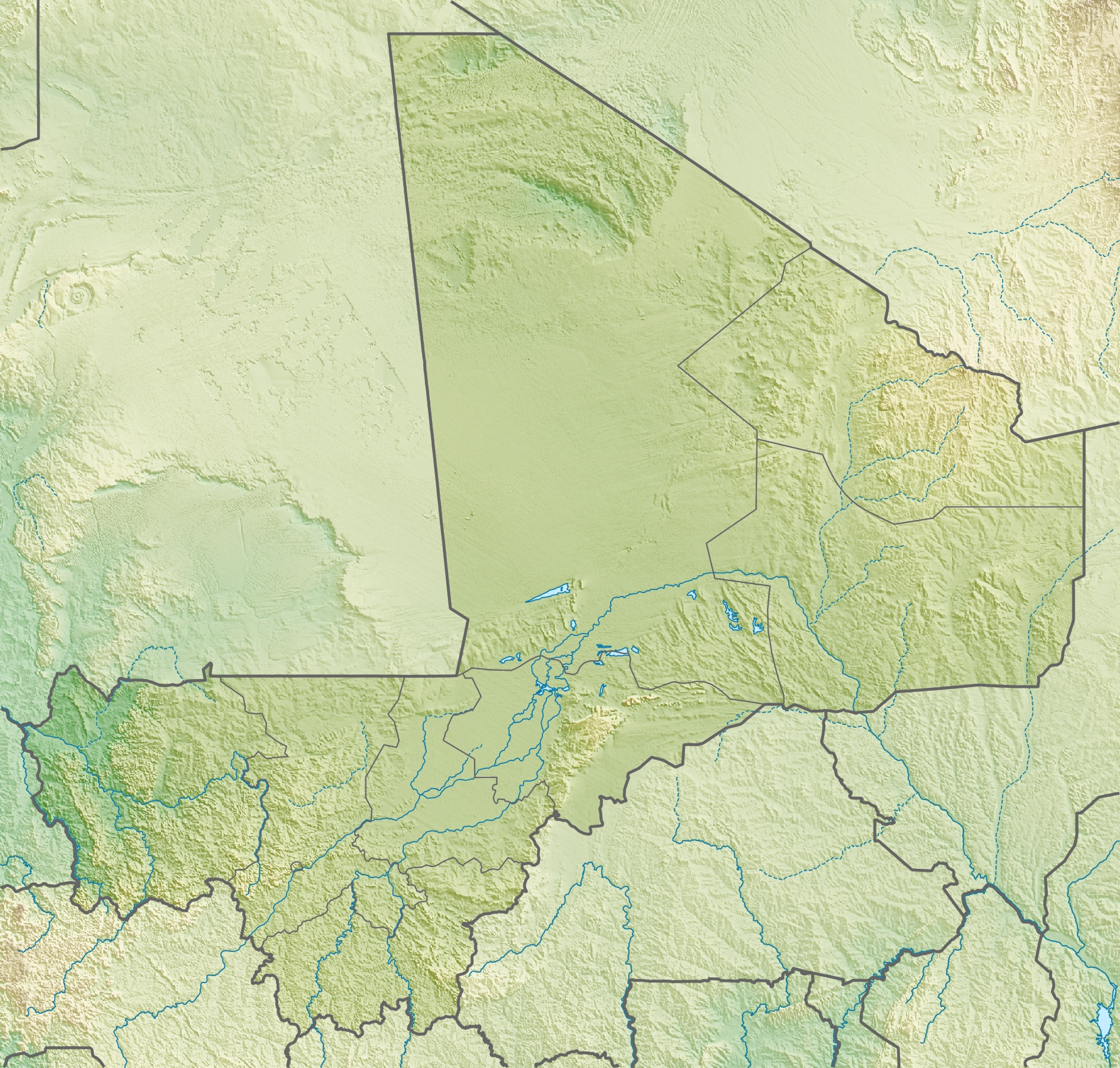
- Location within Mali
- Coordinates: 15°19′0″N 4°6′0″W
- Primary inflows: Niger River
- Primary outflows: Niger River
- Basin countries: Mali
- Surface area: 160 km^{2} (62 sq mi)

Lake Débo is a lake in the central part of Mali, formed by the seasonal flooding of the Niger River basin. It is in the Inner Niger Delta of the Niger River. During high water stages of the river, the delta formed by lakes, creeks, and backwaters form part of Lake Débo. The inner delta has many wide channels, which are shallow and flooded marshes; this delta extends over a length of 320 kilometres (200 miles) with a width of 80 km (50 mi). Lake Débo during high flow season, is at a distance of 80 km (50 mi) from Mopti on its upstream, on the southern end and 240 km (150 mi) from Timbuktu at its downstream, on the north-eastern end. It is the largest of many such seasonal wetlands and lakes which form the Inner Niger Delta, and the largest lake within Mali. Its size is largely reduced during the dry season of September to March. The existence of this lake called the "Great Lake" in the inner delta of Niger River between Jenne and Timbuktu in Mali has been established after extensive study of maps of the region extending over a period from 1000 to 1900 AD; 400 maps were studied for the period.

== History ==
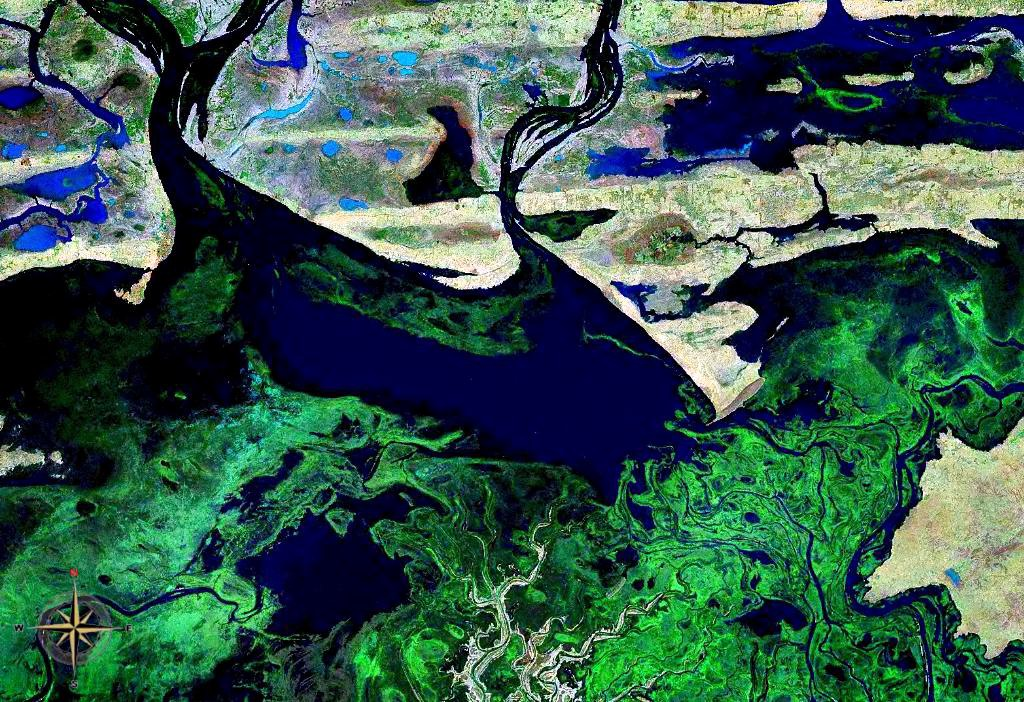
Lake Débo seen from space

This lake, called the "Great Lake" in the inner delta of Niger River between Jenne and Timbuktu in Mali, was known to Europeans from very early times. The earliest known report of it was in the first millennium BC. Ptolemy described it as having the shape of a barbell. Study of more than 400 maps of the region created over a period from 1000 to 1900 AD found that the lake appeared on 95 percent; the only feature depicted on more maps was the Nile. The lake has been known variously as Nigrite Palus, Lake Sigisma, Lake Guber, Lake Guarda, Bog/Morais of Guarda, Lake Maberia, Bahar Seafeena, Lake Dibbie, but it is now known as Lake Débo. The Niger River is assessed as a young river of 2000 years age and is yet to stabilize. However, the natural channels have undergone many meandering changes.

== Geography ==
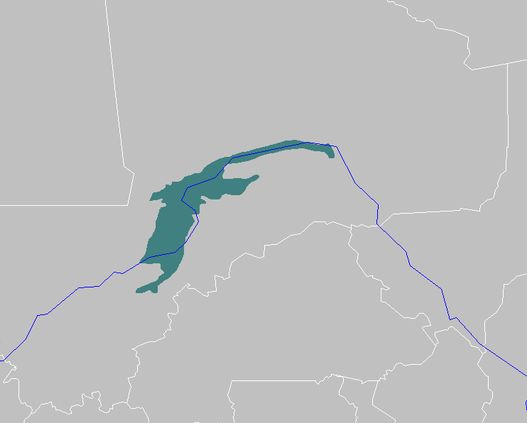
Inner Niger Delta, including Lake Debo, flooded savanna ecoregion map

The lake is formed upstream of the confluence of Niger and Bani Rivers. It is the best known lacustrine lake in Mali, which has diameter of 30 km (19 mi) and shallow and hence large vessels can not pass through the lake. In the upper highland reaches of these rivers, the highland terrain slopes are very gentle resulting in the retardation of flows and creation of this lake. The slope reported before the creation of the lake is 1.5 m (5 ft) per 160 km (100 mi). The lake is divided by a barrier into two zones, the upper and the lower. The barrier extends several kilometres southwards. Beyond the barrier, the lake is narrow and long and its outreach is not visible. The Bara Lisa River joins the Niger above Dire. It exits the deltas from the northern shores of Lake Debo and flows east. The Issa Baris, the main arm of the lake, exits from the lake in a westerly direction and turns northeast to join the Bara Lisa.

Geological formations recorded at the bed of the lake are "from dense crystalline rock of Precambrian sandstone compacted in the broad Taoudeni Syncline as an alluvial fan and covered by a hard layer of cemented-laterite." The flat slopes and geology of the beds has resulted in creating a meandering and multi-channel flow pattern, which has resulted in the formation of inner delta of the Niger. The inner delta thus has many wide channels, which are shallow and flooded marshes; this delta extends over a length of 320 km (200 mi) with a width of 80 km (50 mi). It is inferred from the study of nearly 400 maps that it is the delta which is the origin of the lake and that the lake is the largest in the delta. It is integral to the wide river channel with its size fluctuating with variation of the water level in the lake. It also provides confirmation of the nature of blocked water and also includes the Erg of Bara region. The maximum flood in the lake and the delta occurs during November and December.

Below Lake Debo, the Niger valley is marked by a large number of lakes, which are lower than the river level. As part of the central delta, the lake is the largest. As it is a part of the Niger River, its size varies with the fluctuation in the water level. and maximum flood occurs in the river during November and December. The lake has a vast expanse of water extending on all sides. The river that is formed at the outlet of the lake has a width of 10 km (6 mi) for a length of 10 km (6 mi) downstream, where after it narrows down, gets spilled into many channels; marshy islands are formed and depth of water is in the range of 2.4–3.0 m (8–10 ft). Foolahs, the nomads who live here, use these marshes as pastures in the dry season and thereafter they go back to their habitats in the interior of the basin.

During the high flood stage, flood waters arriving at the lake are reported as 12,400 m^{3}/s (440,000 cu ft/s). This was absorbed in the vast lake, as storage, and the out flow from the lake is thus moderated to only 2,400 m^{3}/s (85,000 cu ft/s) when it reaches Niamey, the capital city of Niger. Since 1962, even a 1,000 m^{3}/s (35,000 cu ft/s) extra flow from the lake could now cause increase of water level in the Niamey area by 2 m (6 ft 7 in), rising to the level 181.51 metres (595 ft 6 in).

=== Climate ===
The lake in the Sahel, just south of the Sahara desert, has climatic conditions which are reported to be a transitional zone of humid Guinean climate in the south to a dry climate at border with the Sahara. The rainy season in the south lasts from July to October, with an average annual rainfall of 750 mm (30 in). However, the rainy season in the north lasts from July to September, with an average annual precipitation recorded at 250 mm (9.8 in). Temperatures vary with strong seasonal emphasis. The average maximum temperature recorded in May at Tombouctou is 43 °C (109 °F) and at Mopti is 40 °C (104 °F). The cooler climatic season is from December to January with temperatures dropping to a mean minimum of 3 °C (37 °F) to 6 °C (43 °F) in the northern part of the delta.

Lake Débo during high flow season when it has the maximum dimensions of water spread, is 80 km (50 mi) from Mopti on its upstream, on the southern end, and 240 km (150 mi) from Timbuktu at its downstream, on the north-eastern end. It is the largest of many such seasonal wetlands and lakes which form the Inner Niger Delta, and the largest lake within Mali. Its size is largely reduced during the dry season of September to March.

== Vegetation ==
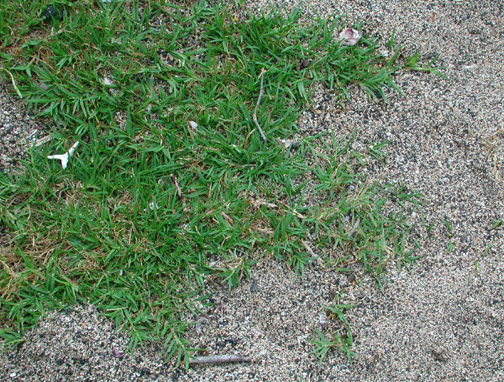
Cynodon dactylon, vegetation of dūrvā gras

The inundated Lake Débo and Walado Débo (Inner Niger Delta in Mali) form the pasture lands which are collectively known as the flooded forest savannah with aquatic herbaceous and two dominant species of acacia. These pastures are known locally as bourgou grass. Palms like Hyphaene thebaica, and Borassus aethiopum are also reported on the fringes of the lake.

There are three types of pasture lands, defined on the basis of its management. These are: Resident Fulani's pastures which are controlled by the Amiro (the chief Joro); the "Harima" (meaning: a local convention) with the chief of village and other members responsible for its usage; and the several small holdings (within the bourgou) parceled to private individuals. the perennial grasses grown are edible and easily digestible with botanical names of Echinochloa stagnina (a perennial plant) and Vossia cuspidata, and which grow in varying depths of water (3–5 m or 10–16 ft). The crop variety, which is extensive, is of wild rice (Oryza longistaminata and bartti). Another plant species that acts as barrier to sand deposition is the Vetiveria nigritiana, when the water stages in the lake and the delta is high. The aquatic plants sustain varying levels of water in the lake and the soil types dictates the ecology of the region.

The sloping banks of the lake have shrubs interspersed with grasses and vacant patches, and woody species, generally of acacia species. Akkagoun and Dentaka are the forested areas surrounding the lake and the delta, which are home for many water birds. Algal blooms are also reported from the lake which could result in reduction of the water transparency.

== Fauna ==
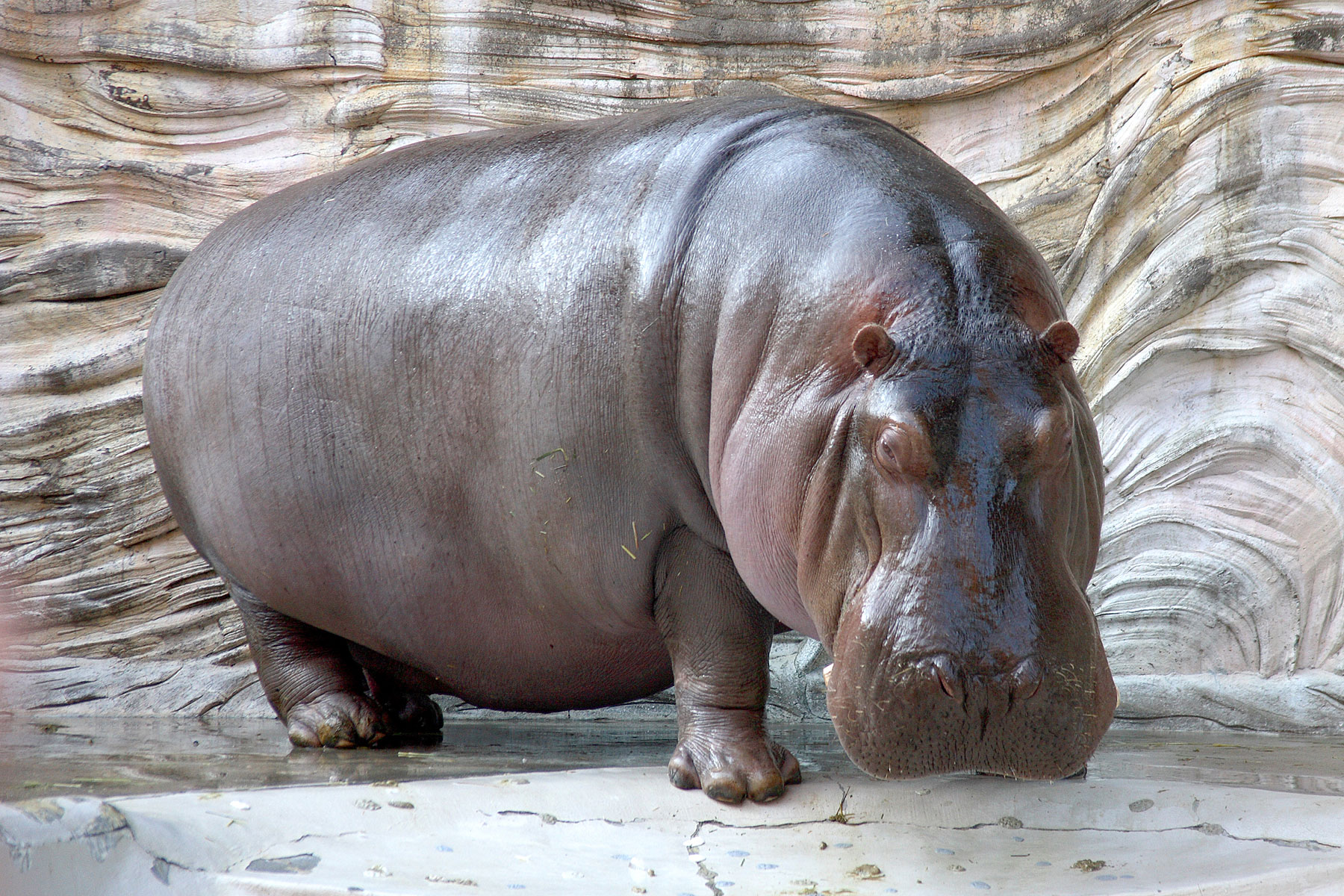
Hippopotamus

The West African manatee is the most prominent fauna species in the lake which is reported as its last habitat in the world. Hippopotamuses are also reported from the lake (the hippopotamus population is estimated at 40 to 60 individuals). Nile crocodile is also reported from the flood plains. Within the basin area of the lake and the delta mammal species reported include: roan antelope, dorcas gazelle, dama gazelle, red-fronted gazelle, whilst reptile species include Nile monitor and African rock python.

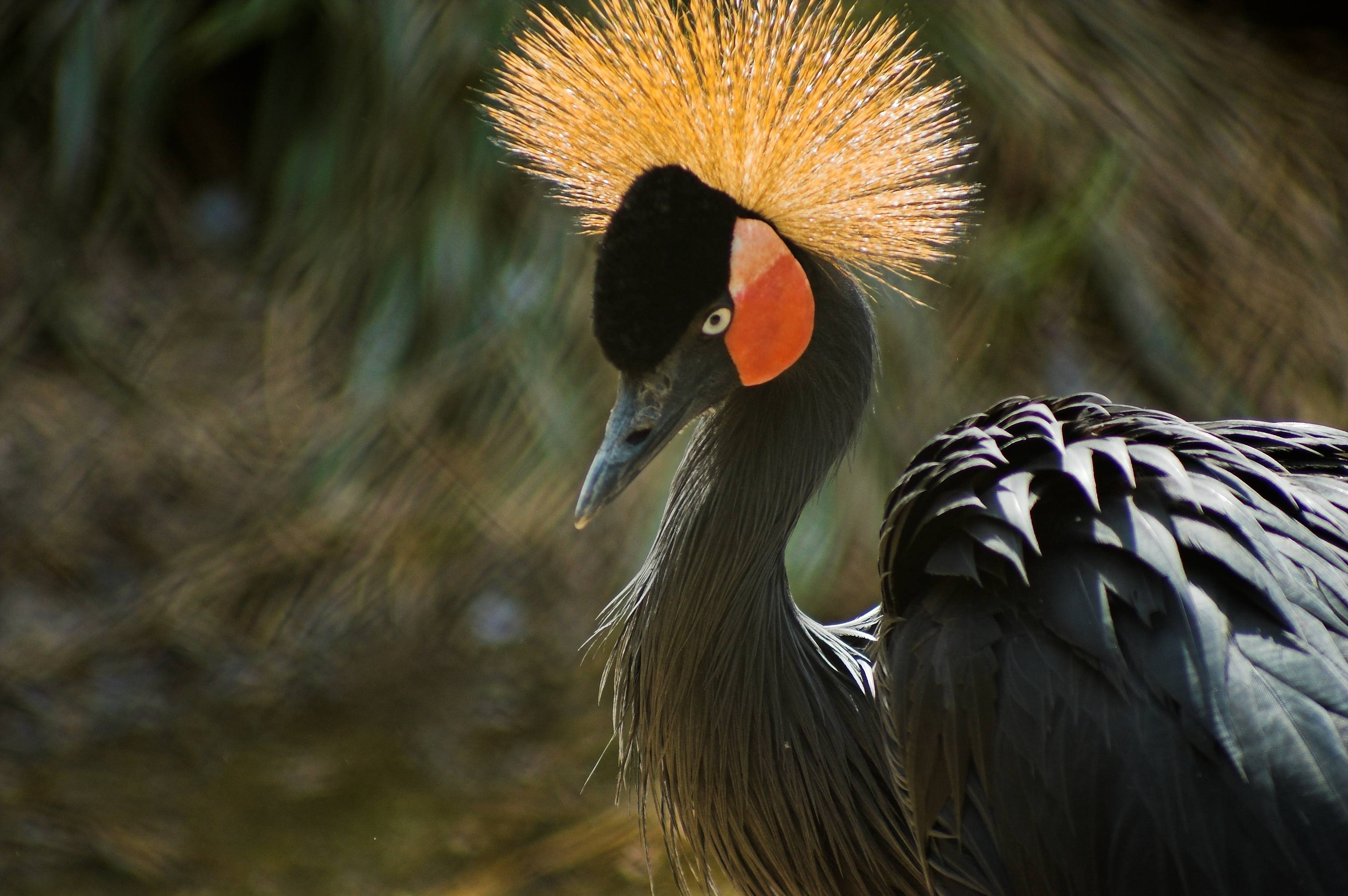
Artis black-crowned crane.

The avifauna found within the lake area, which forms one of the major wetlands in the Sahel, is represented by species from both the Palearctic and Afrotropic ecozones. Over one million birds have been recorded as using the lake;, including a large number of migratory and resident species, such as sand martin and yellow wagtail, reed cormorant, glossy ibis, spoonbill, great white egret, purple heron, ferruginous duck, white-winged black tern, ruff and black-tailed godwit. However, a number of Afrotropical species such as the rare black crowned crane are dwindling. A sea side feeling is felt around the lake and the delta, as the air is filled with the sounds of water birds and gulls.

As the lake is an important stopping place for migratory birds, UNESCO has classified it as a Ramsar zone under the title whole of Lake Walado Débo, which is part of the inner delta with 350 species of birds, including 118 migratory species.

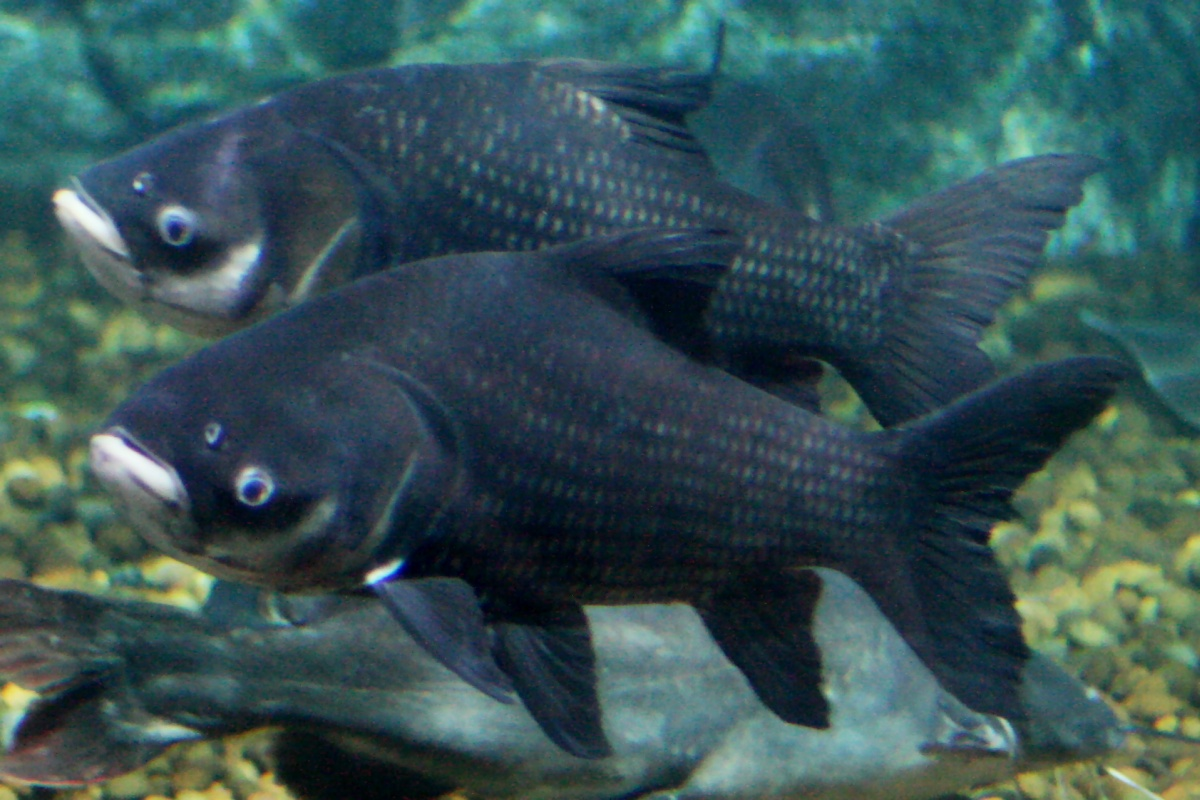
The giant barb

The Synodontis gobroni and the Gobiocichla wonderi are two endemic species of fishes in the lake which is part of the inland delta.

The aquatic fauna in the delta as a whole, which is reflective of the lake also, consists of 130 species mostly of the species in the families of Mormyridae, Mochokidae, and Cyprinidae. There are many migratory fish species which migrate along the river to this region; out of these migrating fishes the African tetras Brycinus leuciscus travels long distances up to the delta and also up to the toe of the Markala Dam.

== Culture ==
When the Niger and Bani Rivers are in spate, fishing operations are carried out in the lake using trawlers. The ethnic Bozo fisherman, resident on the shores of the lake are involved in these operations. During the dry season, the many ethnic Fula nomads come to this lake area as their terminus destination during the seasonal transhumance migration along with their herds from the north.
