= Synodontis gobroni =

Conservation status
- Least Concern (IUCN 3.1)

Scientific classification
- Domain: Eukaryota
- Kingdom: Animalia
- Phylum: Chordata
- Class: Actinopterygii
- Order: Siluriformes
- Family: Mochokidae
- Genus: Synodontis
- Species: S. gobroni

Binomial name
- Synodontis gobroni Daget, 1954

Species of fish

Synodontis gobroni is a species of upside-down catfish native to the Niger River basin where it is found in the nations of Guinea, Mali, Niger and Nigeria. This species grows to a length of 60 centimetres (24 in) TL.
