= Youwarou =

Youwarou Youvarou
- Commune and village
- Location in Mali
- Coordinates: 15°22′30″N 4°15′45″W
- Country: Mali
- Region: Mopti Region
- Cercle: Youwarou Cercle
- Elevation: 268 m (879 ft)

Population (2009 census)
  - Total: 23,046
- Time zone: UTC+0 (GMT)

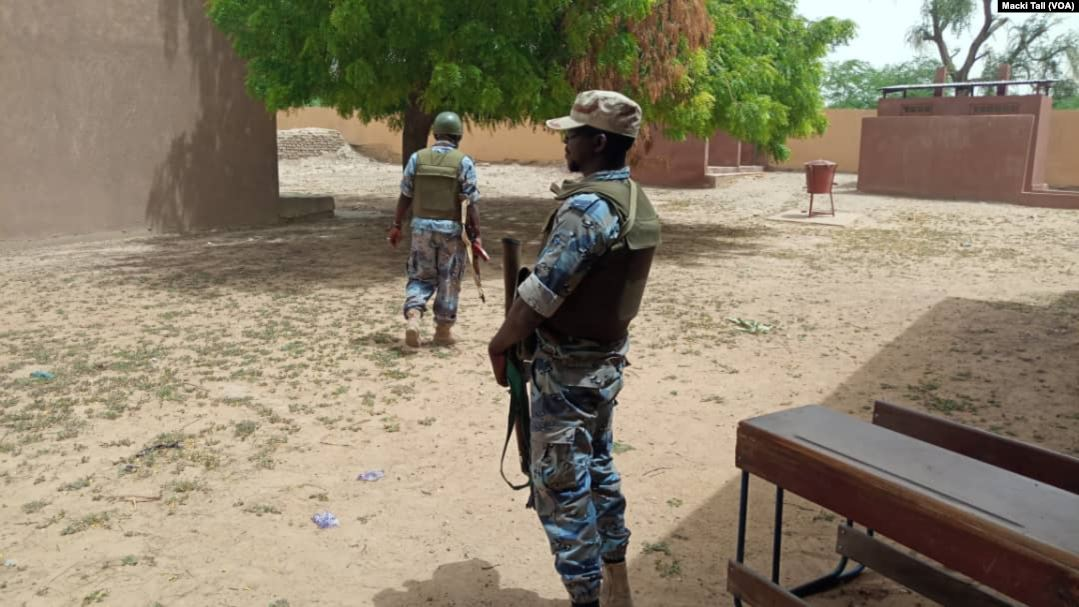
An armed security officer standing at a voting station, in the center town of Youwarou during July 29, 2018 Malian presidential election

Youwarou (or Youvarou) is a village and commune and seat of the Cercle of Youwarou in the Mopti Region of Mali. In 2009 the commune had a population of 23,046.

The market that is held in the village on Fridays serves many settlements in the surrounding region.
