= Youwarou Cercle =

Coordinates: 15°25′N 4°30′W

- Cercle
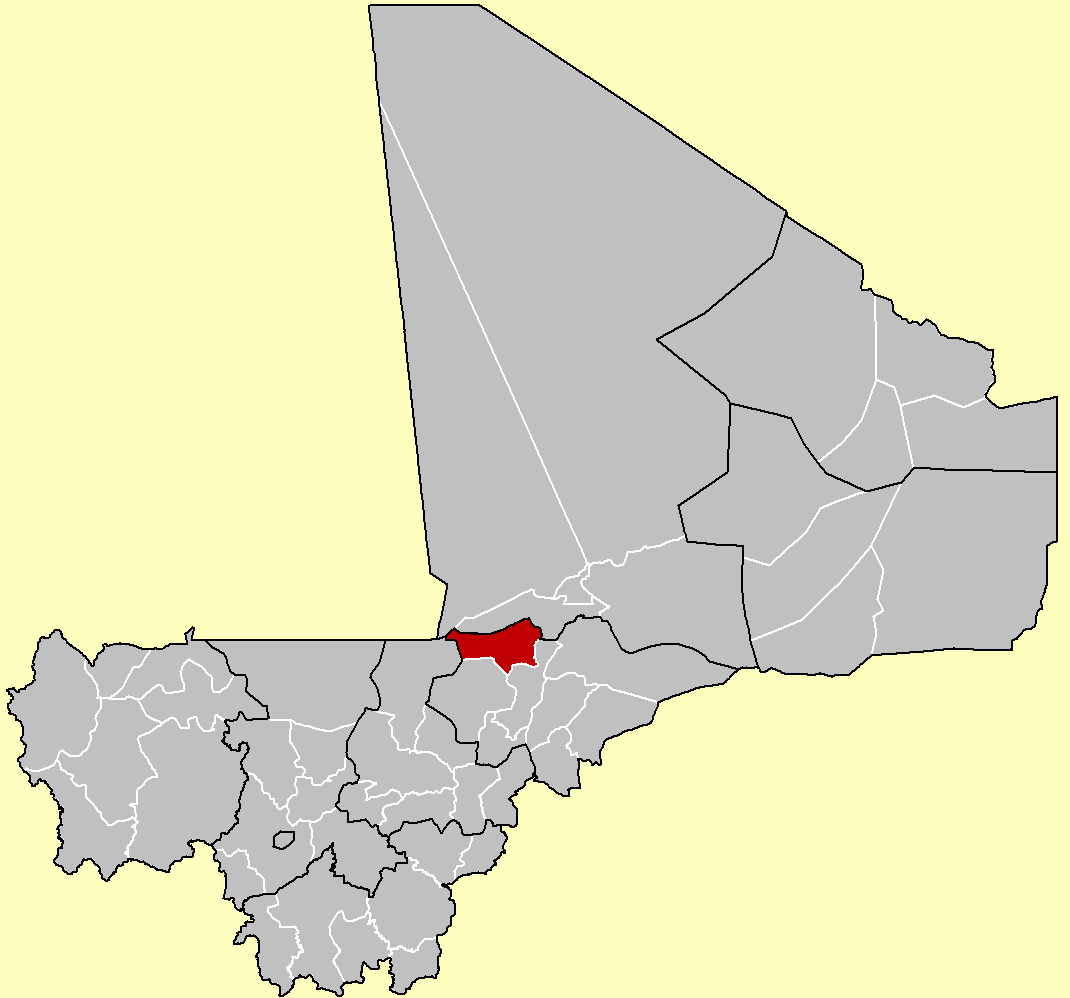
- Location of the Cercle of Youwarou in Mali
- Country: Mali
- Region: Mopti Region
- Admin HQ (chef-lieu): Youwarou

Area
  - Total: 7,139 km^{2} (2,756 sq mi)

Population (2009 census)
  - Total: 106,768
  - Density: 14.96/km^{2} (38.73/sq mi)
- Time zone: UTC+0 (GMT)

Youwarou Cercle is an administrative subdivision of the Mopti Region of Mali. The administrative center (chef-lieu) is the town of Youwarou.

The cercle is divided into seven communes:

- Bimbéré Tama
- Déboye
- Dirma
- Dongo
- Farimaké
- N'Dodjiga
- Youwarou
