= Arrondissements of Mali =

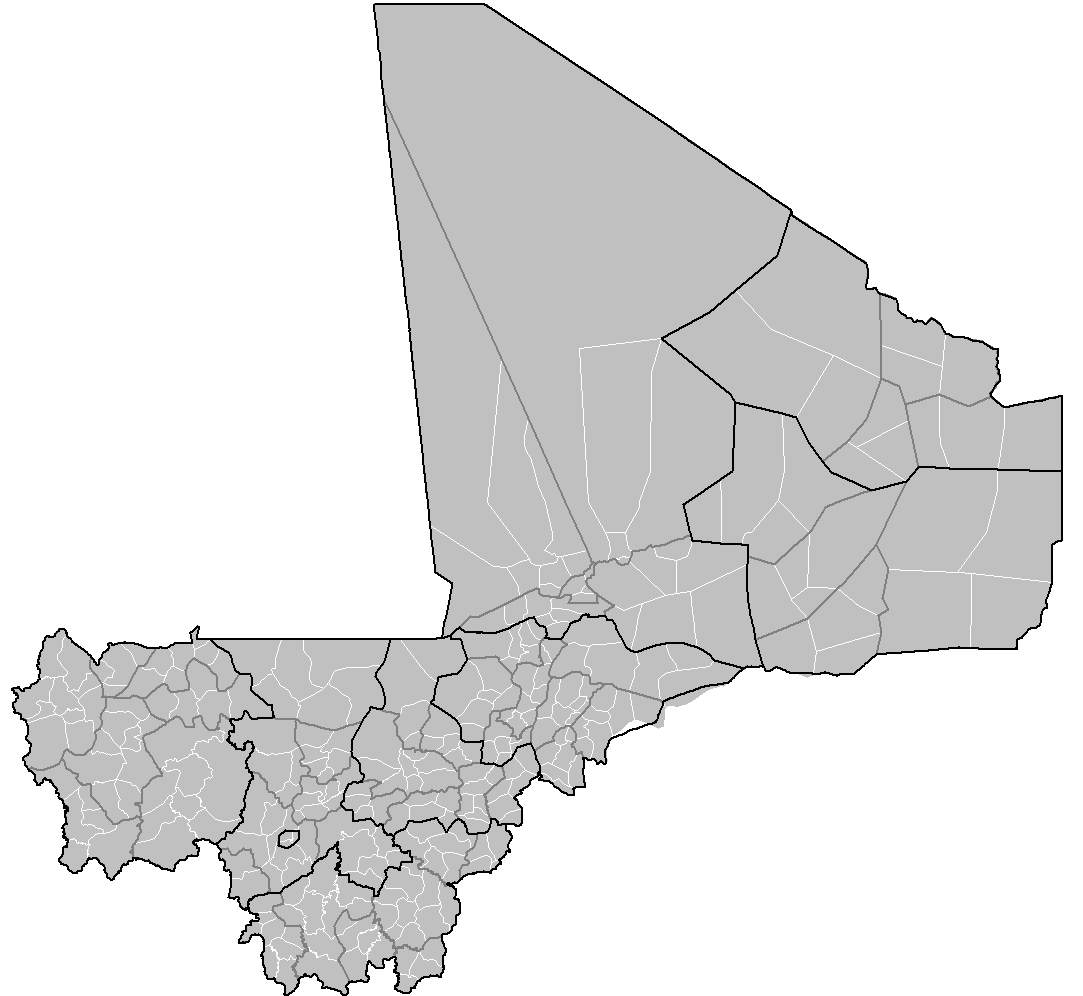
Arrondissements of Mali (outlined in white), with Cercles in grey and Regions in black.

The cercles of Mali are divided into arrondissements. These are further divided into 703 communes, 19 urban and 684 rural. Unlike communes or cercles, arrondissements have no administrative power or elected officials: they are merely territorial divisions or used to divide administrative duties. Often the borders of communes and arrondissements coincide, rendering the arrondissement demarcation of the territory superfluous.

The arrondissements are listed below, by region and cercle:

== Bamako Capital District ==
- No Arrondissements: Six numbered Urban Communes

== Gao Region ==
=== Ansongo Cercle ===
- Ansongo
- Bara
- Bourra
- Ouattagouna
- Talataye
- Tessit
- Tin Hama

=== Bourem Cercle ===
- Bamba
- Bourem
- Taboye
- Tarkint
- Temera

=== Gao Cercle ===
- Anchawadi
- Gabero
- Gao
- Gounzoureye
- N'Tillit
- Soni Ali Ber
- Tilemsi

=== Menaka Cercle ===
- Alata
- Anderamboukane
- Inekar
- Menaka
- Tidermene

== Kayes Region ==
=== Bafoulabe Cercle ===
- Bafoulabe
- Bamafele
- Diakon
- Diallan
- Diokeli
- Gounfan
- Kontela
- Koundian
- Mahina
- Niambia
- Oualia
- Sidibela
- Tomora

=== Diangounté Cercle ===
- Diangounté
- Fatao
- Diéoura
- Lambidou
- Dassara
- Diabira

=== Diéma Cercle ===
- Dianguirde
- Diema
- Dioumara
- Gomitradougou
- Kouloudiengué
- Madiga

=== Kita Cercle ===
- Badia
- Bendougouba
- Benkadi Founia
- Boudofo
- Bougaribaya
- Dindenko
- Djidian
- Djougoun
- Gadougou 1
- Gadougou 2
- Guemoukouraba
- Kassaro
- Kita
- Kita Nord
- Kita Ouest
- Kobri
- Kokofata
- Kotouba
- Koulou
- Kourounnikoto
- Madina
- Makano
- Namala Guimba
- Niantanso
- Saboula
- Sebekoro
- Sefeto Nord
- Sefeto Ouest
- Senko
- Sirakoro
- Souransan-Tomoto
- Tambaga
- Toukoto

=== Kenieba Cercle ===
- Baye
- Dabia
- Dialafara
- Dombia
- Falea
- Faraba
- Guenegore
- Kassama
- Kenieba
- Kouroukoto
- Sagalo
- Sitakily

=== Kayes Cercle ===
- Bangassi
- Diamou
- Djelebou
- Faleme
- Fegui
- Gory Gopela
- Goumera
- Guidimakan Keri Kaffo
- Hawa Dembaya
- Kabate
- Karakoro
- Kayes
- Kemene Tambo
- Khouloum
- Koniakary
- Koussane
- Liberte Dembaya
- Logo
- Marena Diombougou
- Marintoumania
- Sadiola
- Sahel
- Same Diongoma
- Segala
- Sero Diamanou
- Somankidi
- Sony
- Tafacirga

=== Nioro du Sahel Cercle ===
- Baniere Koré
- Diabigué
- Diarra
- Diaye Coura
- Gavinane
- Gogui
- Guetema
- Kadiaba Kadiel
- Korera Kore
- Nioro Du Sahel
- Nioro Tougouné Rangabes
- Sandaré
- Simbi
- Trougounbé
- Yéréré
- Youri

=== Yélimané Cercle ===
- Diafoumou Diongaga
- Diafoumou Gory
- Fanga
- Gory
- Guidime
- Kirane Kaniaga
- Konsiga
- Kremis
- Marekhaffo
- Soumpou
- Toya
- Tringa

== Kidal Region ==
=== Abeibara Cercle ===
- Abeibara
- Boghassa
- Tinzawatene

=== Kidal Cercle ===
- Anefif
- Essouk
- Kidal

=== Tin-Essako Cercle ===
- Intadjedite
- Tin-Essako

=== Tessalit Cercle ===
- Adjelhoc
- Tessalit
- Timtaghene

== Koulikoro Region ==
=== Banamba Cercle ===
- Banamba
- Benkadi
- Boron
- Duguwolowula
- Kiban
- Madina Sacko
- Sebete
- Toubacoro
- Toukoroba

=== Dioila Cercle ===
- Banco
- Benkadi
- Binko
- Degnekoro
- Diebe
- Diedougou
- Diouman
- Dolendougou
- Guegneka
- Jekafo
- Kaladougou
- Kemekafo
- Kerela
- Kilidougou
- Massigui
- Nangola
- N'Dlondougou
- N'Garadougou
- N'Golobougou
- Niantjila
- Tenindougou
- Wacoro
- Zan Coulibaly

=== Kangaba Cercle ===
- Balan Bakana
- Benkadi
- Kaniogo
- Karan
- Maramandougou
- Minidian
- Narena
- Nouga
- Selefougou

=== Koulikoro Cercle ===
- Dinandougou
- Doumba
- Koula
- Koulikoro
- Meguetan
- Nyamina
- Sirakorola
- Tienfala
- Tougouni

=== Kolokani Cercle ===
- Djidieni
- Guihoyo
- Kolokani
- Massantola
- Nonkon
- Nonssombougou
- Ouolodo
- Sagabala
- Sebekoro 1
- Tioribougou

=== Kati Cercle ===
- Baguineda Camp
- Bancoumana
- Bossofala
- Bougoula
- Daban
- Diago
- Dialakoroba
- Dialakorodji
- Diedougou
- Dio-Gare
- Dogodouman
- Dombila
- Doubabougou
- Faraba
- Kalabancoro
- Kalifabougou
- Kambila
- Kati
- Kourouba
- Mande
- Moribabougou
- Mountougoula
- Ngabacoro Droit
- N'Gouraba
- Niagadina
- Nioumamakana
- N'Tjiba
- Ouelessebougou
- Safo
- Sanankoro Djitoumou
- Sanankoroba
- Sangarebougou
- Siby
- Sobra
- Tiakadougou Dialakoro
- Tiele
- Yelekebougou

=== Nara Cercle ===
- Allahina
- Dabo
- Dilly
- Dogofry
- Fallou
- Gueneibe
- Guire
- Koronga
- Nara
- Niamana
- Ouagadou

== Mopti Region ==
=== Bandiagara Cercle ===
- Bandiagara
- Bara Sara
- Borko
- Dandoli
- Diamnati
- Dogani Bere
- Doucoumbo
- Dourou
- Kende
- Kendie
- Lowol Gueou
- Metoumou
- Ondougou
- Pelou
- Pignari
- Pignari Bana
- Sangha
- Segue Ire
- Soroly
- Timiri
- Wadouba

=== Bankass Cercle ===
- Bankass
- Baye
- Diallassagou
- Dimbal Habbe
- Kani Bonzon
- Koulogon Habbe
- Lessagou Habbe
- Ouenkoro
- Segue
- Sokoura
- Soubala
- Tori

=== Djenné Cercle ===
- Dandougou Fakala
- Derary
- Djenne
- Fakala
- Femaye
- Kewa
- Madiama
- Nema-Badeya-Kafo
- Niansanari
- Ouro Ali
- Pondori
- Togue Mourari

=== Douentza Cercle ===
- Dallah
- Dangol-Bore
- Debere
- Dianvely
- Djaptodji
- Douentza
- Gandamia
- Haire
- Hombori
- Kerena
- Korarou
- Koubelwel Koundia
- Mondoro
- Petaka
- Tedie

=== Koro Cercle ===
- Bamba
- Barapireli
- Bondo
- Diankabou
- Dinangourou
- Dioungani
- Dougoutene I
- Dougoutene II
- Kassa
- Koporo Pen
- Koporokendie Na
- Koro
- Madougou
- Pel Maoude
- Yoro
- Youdiou

=== Mopti Cercle ===
- Bassirou
- Borondougou
- Konna
- Korombana
- Koubaye
- Kounari
- Mopti
- Ouro-Modi
- Ouroube Doude
- Sasalbe
- Soye
- Socoura
- Sio

=== Tenenkou Cercle ===
- Dialloube
- Diafarabe
- Diaka
- Diondori
- Kareri
- Ouro Ardo
- Ouro-Guire
- Sougoulbe
- Tenenkou
- Togoro-Kotia
- Toguere-Coumbe

=== Youwarou Cercle ===
- Fatoma
- Bimbere Tama
- Deboye
- Dirma
- Dongo
- Farimake
- N'Dodjiga
- Youwarou

== Ségou Region ==
=== Bla Cercle ===
- Beguene
- Bla
- Diaramana
- Diena
- Dougouolo
- Falo
- Fani
- Kazangasso
- Kemeni
- Korodougou
- Koulandougou
- Niala
- Samabogo
- Somasso
- Tiemena
- Touna
- Yangasso

=== Barouéli Cercle ===
- Baraoueli
- Boidie
- Dougoufie
- Gouendo
- Kalake
- Konobougou
- N'Gassola
- Sanando
- Somo
- Tamani
- Tesserela

=== Macina Cercle ===
- Boky Were
- Folomana
- Kokry
- Kolongo
- Macina
- Matomo
- Nonimpebougou
- Saloba
- Sana
- Souleye
- Tongue

=== Niono Cercle ===
- Diabaly
- Dogofry
- Kala Siguida
- Mariko
- Nampalari
- Niono
- Pogo
- Siribala
- Sirifila Boundy
- Sokolo
- Toridaga-Ko
- Yeredon Saniona

=== Ségou Cercle ===
- Baguindadougou
- Bellen
- Boussin
- Cinzana
- Diedougou
- Diganibougou
- Dioro
- Diouna
- Dougabougou
- Farako
- Farakou Massa
- Fatine
- Kamiandougou
- Katiena
- Konodimini
- Markala
- Massala
- N'Gara
- N'Koumandougou
- Pelengana
- Sakoiba
- Sama Foulala
- Samine
- Sansanding
- Sebougou
- Segou
- Sibila
- Soignebougou
- Souba
- Togou

=== San Cercle ===
- Baramandougou
- Dah
- Diakourouna
- Dieli
- Djeguena
- Fion
- Kaniegue
- Karaba
- Kassorola
- Kava
- Moribila
- N'Goa
- Niamana
- Niasso
- N'Torosso
- Ouolon
- San
- Siadougou
- Somo
- Sourountouna
- Sy
- Tene
- Teneni
- Tourakolomba
- Waky

=== Tominian Cercle ===
- Benena
- Diora
- Fangasso
- Koula
- Lanfiala
- Mafoune
- Mandiakuy
- Ouan
- Sanekuy
- Timissa
- Tominian
- Yasso

== Sikasso Region ==
=== Bougouni Cercle ===
- Bladie-Tiemala
- Bougouni
- Danou
- Debelin
- Defina
- Dogo
- Domba
- Faradiele
- Faragouaran
- Garalo
- Keleya
- Kokele
- Kola
- Koumantou
- Kouroulamini
- Meridiela
- Ouroun
- Sanso
- Sibirila
- Sido
- Syen Toula
- Teimala Banimonotie
- Wola
- Yinindougou
- Yiridougou
- Zantiebougou

=== Kolondieba Cercle ===
- Bougoula
- Fakola
- Farako
- Kadiana
- Kebila
- Kolondieba
- Kolosso
- Mena
- Nangalasso
- N'Golodiana
- Tiongui
- Tousseguela

=== Kadiolo Cercle ===
- Diou
- Dioumatene
- Fourou
- Kadiolo
- Kai
- Loulouni
- Misseni
- Nimbougou
- Zegoua

=== Koutiala Cercle ===
- Diedougou
- Diouradougou Kafo
- Fagui
- Fakolo
- Gouadji Kao
- Goudie Sougouna
- Kafo Faboli
- Kapala
- Karangouana Malle
- Kolonigue
- Konigue
- Konina
- Konseguela
- Koromo
- Kouniana
- Koutiala
- Logouana
- Miena
- M'Pessoba
- Nafanga
- Nampe
- N'Golonianasso
- N'Gountjina
- Niantaga
- N'Tossoni
- Sincina
- Sinkolo
- Songo Doubakore
- Songoua
- Sorobasso
- Tao
- Yognogo
- Zanfigue
- Zangasso et arrondissement
- Zaniena
- Zebala

=== Sikasso Cercle ===
- Benkadi
- Blendio
- Danderesso
- Dembela
- Dialakoro
- Diomatene
- Dogoni
- Doumanaba
- Fama
- Farakala
- Finkolo
- Finkolo Ganadougou
- Gongasso
- Kabarasso
- Kaboila
- Kafouziela
- Kapala
- Kapolondougou
- Kignan
- Klela
- Kofan
- Kolokoba
- Koumankou
- Kouoro
- Kourouma
- Lobougoula
- Miniko
- Miria
- Missirikoro
- Natien
- Niena
- Nongo-Souala
- N'Tjikouna
- Pimperna
- Sanzana
- Sikasso
- Sokourani-Missirikoro
- Tella
- Tiankadi
- Wateni
- Zanferebougou
- Zangaradougou
- Zaniena

=== Yanfolila Cercle ===
- Baya
- Bolo Fouta
- Djallon Foula
- Djiguiya De Koloni
- Gouanan
- Gouandiaka
- Koussan
- Sankarani
- Sere Moussa Ani Samou De Siekorole
- Tagandougou
- Wassoulou Balle
- Yallankoro Soloba

=== Yorosso Cercle ===
- Boura
- Karangana
- Kiffosso
- Koumbia
- Koury
- Mahou
- Menamba
- Ourikela
- Yorosso

== Tombouctou Region ==
=== Diré Cercle ===
- Arham
- Binga
- Bourem Sidi Amar
- Dangha
- Dire
- Garbakoira
- Haibongo
- Kirchamba
- Kondi
- Sareyamou
- Tienkour
- Tindirma
- Tinguereguif

=== Goundam Cercle ===
- Adarmalane
- Alzounoub
- Bintagoungou
- Douekire
- Doukouria
- Essakane
- Gargando
- Goundam
- Issa Bery
- Kaneye
- M'Bouna
- Razelma
- Tele
- Tilemsi
- Tin-Aicha
- Tonka

=== Gourma-Rharous Cercle ===
- Bambara Maoude
- Banikane
- Gossi
- Hamzakoma
- Haribomo
- Inadiatafane
- Ouinerden
- Rharous
- Serere

=== Niafunke Cercle ===
- Banikane Narhawa
- Dianke
- Fittouga
- Koumaira
- Lere
- N'Gorkou
- Soboundou
- Soumpi

=== Timbuktu Cercle ===
- Alafia
- Ber
- Bourem Inaly
- Lafia
- Salam
- Tombouctou

== See also ==
- Regions of Mali
- Cercles of Mali
- Communes of Mali
