= Gory Gopela =

- Commune and town
- Location in Mali
- Coordinates: 14°35′N 11°26′W
- Country: Mali
- Region: Kayes Region
- Cercle: Kayes Cercle

Area
  - Commune and town: 330.3 km^{2} (127.5 sq mi)

Population (2009 census)
  - Commune and town: 7,712
  - Density: 24/km^{2} (62/sq mi)
  - Metro: 3,605
  - Ethnicities: Soninke Khassonké Bambara and Fula
  - Religions: Islam Christianity
- Time zone: UTC+0 (GMT)

Gory Gopela is a rural commune and small town and in the Cercle of Kayes in western Mali. In 2009 it had a total population of 7,712, with around 3,600 people in the main town.

== Geography and climate ==
Gory Gopela is a rural commune, located over 500 kilometres from Bamako and about 25 kilometres north of Kayes city in the south-west of Mali. The commune, which covers a total area of 330 km^{2}, is bounded by the municipality of Koussané in the north, by Kouloun in the south, and by Bangassi in the east.

The commune contains a number of villages of note, which include Koumaréfara (pop. 1,520), Bougountinti (pop. 1,300), Tichy-Gansoye (pop. 1,115) and the main town of Gory-Göpel (Gory Gopela) (pop. 3,605). The smaller village of Dag-Dag (pop. 553) also lies within the commune, though facilities in Dag-Dag are considerably lesser than the larger villages.

The climate of Gory Gopela is Sudano-Sahel. Gory Gopela is predominantly dry and hot, and there are three seasons: a rainy season, a warm season and a cold season. Rainfall is very low for much of the year, hindering agriculture; this is worsened by the lack of agricultural land fallow. Soil erosion is a problem in Gory Gopela, where excessive removal of woodland and dry soils prone to soil erosion have contributed to a declining soil fertility.

== Government ==
Administration of the commune is led by the mayor, deputy mayor, the councilors, a secretary, a director, and a secretary typist.

== Demographics ==
In 2009 the commune had a population of compared to 5,296 in 1968.

The population are primarily Soninke, Khassonké, Malinke, and Fula in ethnicity. The population is young, with 58% of the population aged 0 to 18 as of 2006. The population density is 24 people per square kilometre. Over 800 immigrants are living in the commune, some of them aid workers from countries such as France, United States and Hong Kong but also people from Gabon, Libya and Democratic Republic of the Congo.

== Economy ==
The main industry in Gory is agriculture; millet, maize, groundnuts, and sorghum are important crops. Some farmers have access to fertilisers and improved seeds, though increasing production and yields is difficult given the commune's climate. The commune has more than 3,600 cattle, with over 660 sheep and 700 goats and donkeys. Fishing is practiced only during the winter. In the town and the larger villages a number of the population are employed as potters, blacksmiths, masons, mechanics etc.

Transport and communications are underdeveloped, and people are transported to and from Kayes by the very few who own vehicles. As of 2006 the commune did not have any landline networks.

There is one medical facility in the commune in the town of Gory. There is one doctor, three nurses, a midwife, and a pharmacist. Malaria is common in the area.
