= Diboli =

- Town
- Location in Mali
- Coordinates: 14°27′27″N 12°12′0″W
- Country: Mali
- Region: Kayes Region
- Cercle: Kayes Cercle
- Commune: Falémé
- Time zone: UTC+0 (GMT)

Diboli is a small town and principal settlement of the Falémé department, in the Cercle of Kayes in the Kayes Region of south-western Mali. It is located just 0.6 km (0.37 mi) from the Mali–Senegal border. Its nearest big town is Kidira, across the Faleme river in Senegal.
