= Colimbiné =

- Commune
- Location in Mali
- Coordinates: 14°30′40″N 11°12′36″W
- Country: Mali
- Region: Kayes Region
- Cercle: Kayes Cercle

Population (2009 census)
  - Total: 12,101
- Time zone: UTC+0 (GMT)

Colimbiné or Kolimbiné is a commune in the Cercle of Kayes in the Kayes Region of south-western Mali. The main village (chef-lieu) is Kabaté. In 2009 the commune had a population of 12,101.
