= Médine, Mali =

Médine Medina
- Village
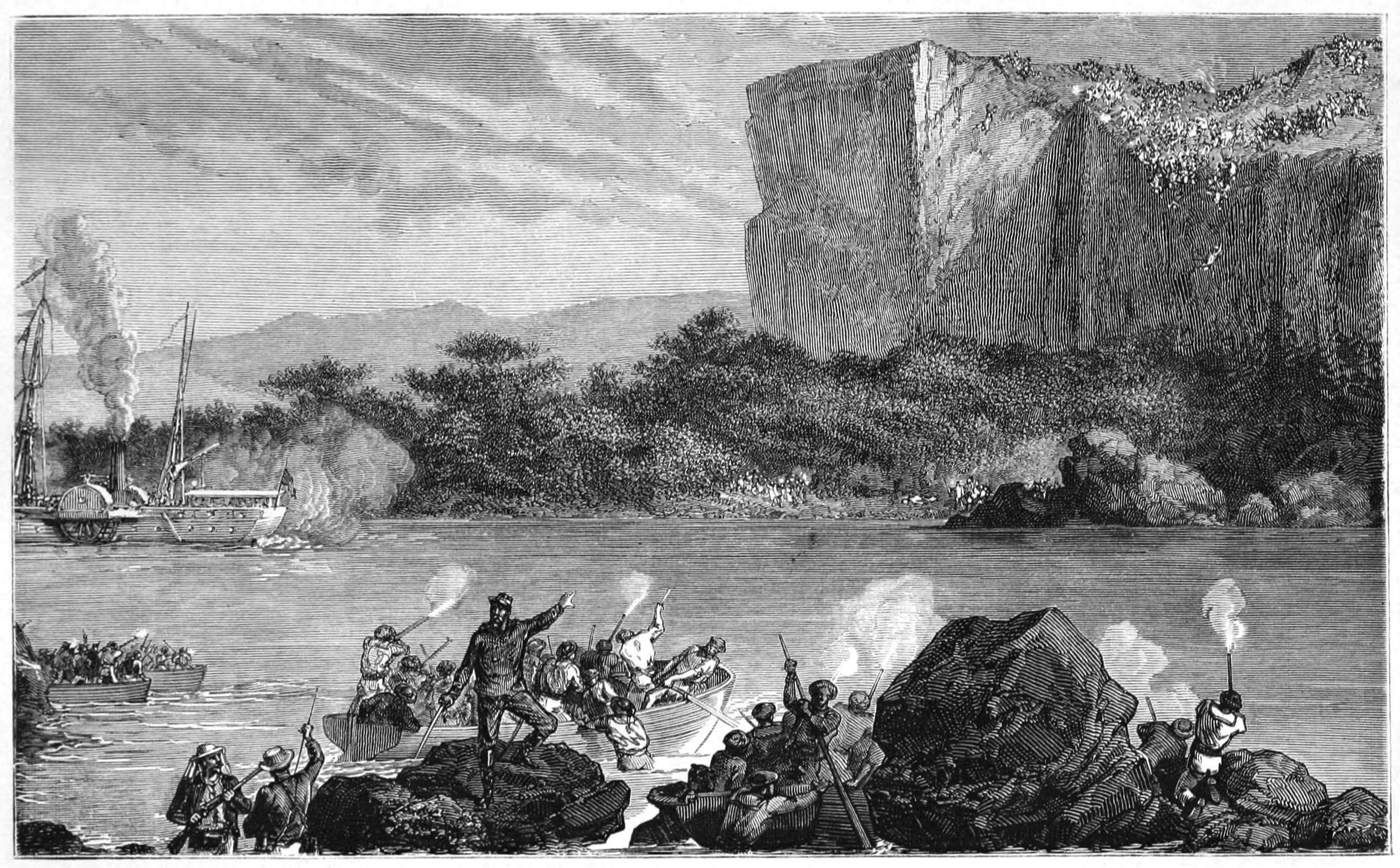
- Eugene Mage's view of the lifting of the siege of Fort du Médine, from Voyage dans le Soudan occidental (1868).

- Location in Mali
- Coordinates: 14°22′34″N 11°22′06″W
- Country: Mali
- Region: Kayes Region
- Cercle: Kayes Cercle
- Commune: Hawa Dembaya
- Time zone: UTC+0 (GMT)

Médine is a village and principal settlement (chef-lieu) of the commune of Hawa Dembaya in the Cercle of Kayes in the Kayes Region of south-western Mali. The village is located 12 km east of Kayes on the left bank of the Sénégal River just downstream of the Félou Falls. The site of the village was historically important as the falls were the furthest point up the Sénégal River from Saint Louis that could be reached by boat. Navigation was only possible after the rainy season when the river was in flood.

== History ==
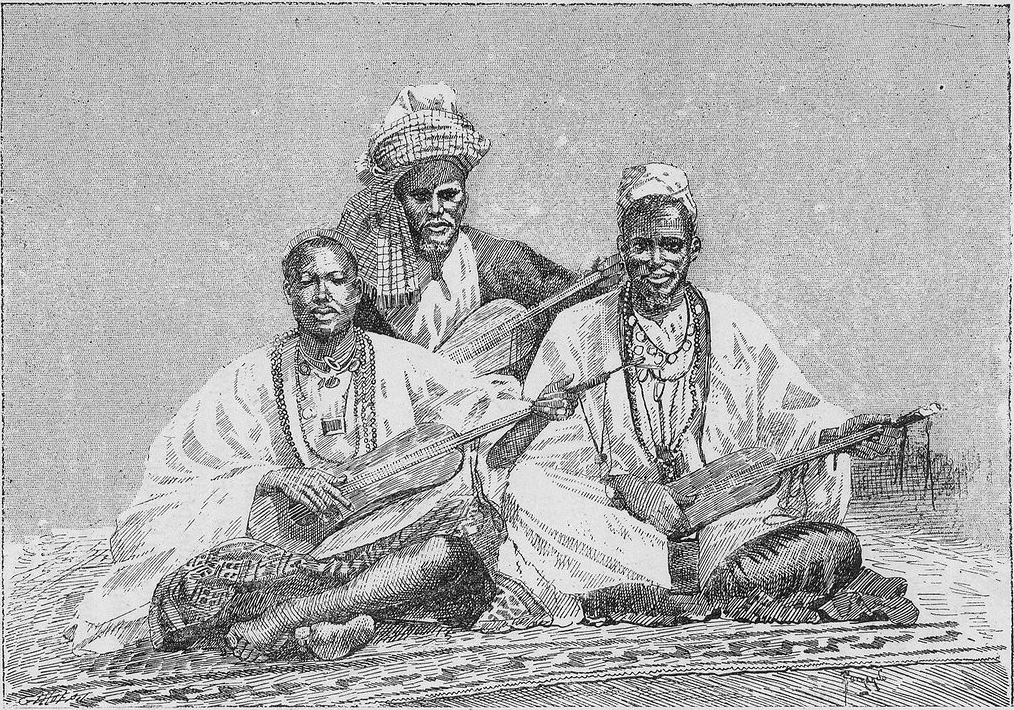
Griots of Sambala, the king of Medine. Photo by Joannès Barbier.

Beginning in 1800 Medina became the capital of Dembaya, one of the small kingdoms that had split from Khasso after a civil war.

=== Rising French Power ===
France at this time was struggling to create a West African empire to rival the holdings of its powerful neighbor England. The previous year, the French legislature had voted the first funds for what would become the Dakar-Niger railway line, a key transportation system to link France's colonies. As the railroad line expanded toward the east, the army established a series of forts, moving troops and cannon into them by steamship where possible and overland where not.

In 1848, Umar Tall launched his jihad against neighboring Malinké regions. By 1855, his rapid expansion had led to several skirmishes with the French army. With the authorization of his ally, queen Hawa Demba Diallo, Governor Faidherbe ordered a fort built at the Khasso village of Médina.

=== Siege by El Hadj Umar Tall ===
In April 1857, Umar Tall declared war against the Khasso kingdom, and marched on Médina Fort, their nearest outpost, with an army of 20,000 to 25,000 riflemen. He laid siege to the fort and began a series of assaults that resulted in hundreds of casualties for the Toucouleur army. In the 97 days that followed, the defenders' food supplies soon ran low, and the fort was on the verge of surrendering when Faidherbe arrived by steamboat with supplies and 500 reinforcements, breaking the siege.

=== Consequences ===
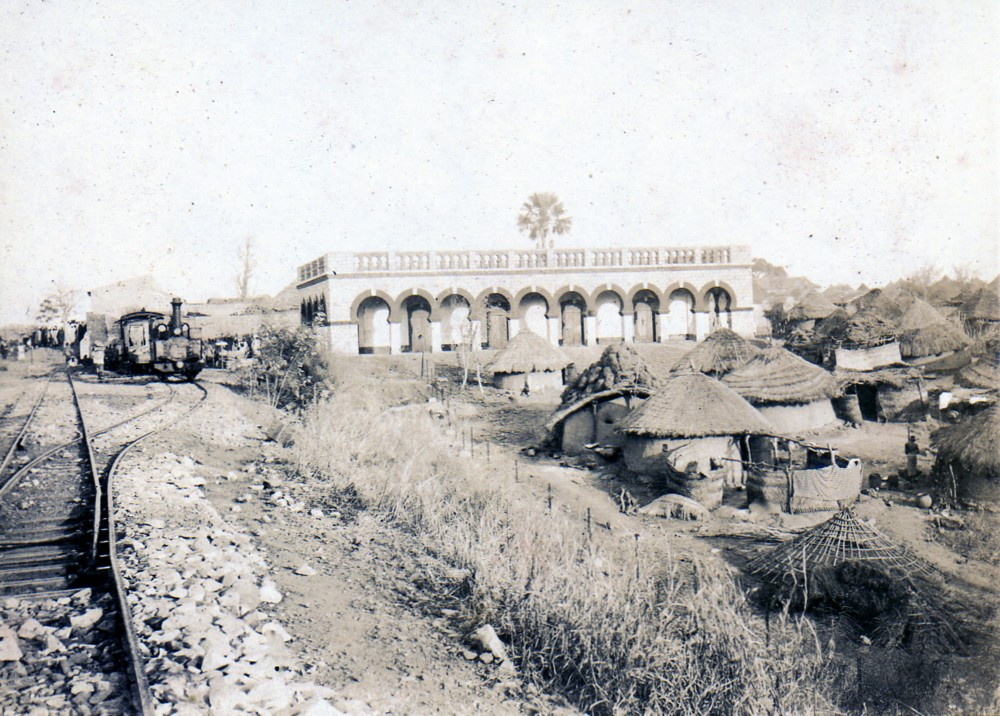
The Médine train station along the Dakar-Niger Railway, c. 1895

Realizing the difficulties of attacking the well-equipped French, Umar Tall turned his attention to the neighboring Bambara Empire, soon conquering most of its territory including its capital of Ségou. However, the French continued to expand their West African presence, conquering Ségou and the Toucouleur Empire less than thirty years after Umar Taal's death.

== Today ==
On 19 March 2009 the Malian Government submitted the Médine Fort to be added to the tentative list of heritage sites of the UNESCO World Heritage Centre. The Fort du Médine is open to the public. There is also an old railroad station on the Dakar-Koulikoro line 2 km to the west of the village and a European-style cemetery with graves from the mid-19th century. The village population is around 1800 with a small market daily.
