= Ambidédi =

- Small town
- Location in Mali
- Coordinates: 14°35′7″N 11°47′25″W
- Country: Mali
- Region: Kayes Region
- Cercle: Kayes Cercle
- Commune: Kéméné Tambo
- Time zone: UTC+0 (GMT)

Ambidédi is a small town and principal settlement (chef-lieu) of the commune of Kéméné Tambo in the Cercle of Kayes in the Kayes Region of south-western Mali.
