= Gakoura =

- Village
- Location in Mali
- Coordinates: 14°36′45″N 11°50′38″W
- Country: Mali
- Region: Kayes Region
- Cercle: Kayes Cercle
- Commune: Guidimakan Keri Kafo
- Time zone: UTC+0 (GMT)

Gakoura is a village and administrative center (chef-lieu) of the commune of Guidimakan Keri Kafo in the Cercle of Kayes in the Kayes Region of south-western Mali. The village lies on the north bank of the Senegal River.
