= Tafacirga =

- Commune and village
- Location in Mali
- Coordinates: 14°45′25″N 12°11′28″W
- Country: Mali
- Region: Kayes Region
- Cercle: Kayes Cercle

Population (2009 census)
  - Total: 7,491
- Time zone: UTC+0 (GMT)

Tafacirga (or Tafasirga) is a village and commune in the Cercle of Kayes in the Kayes Region of south-western Mali. The commune lies at the northeast corner of the Kayes Region with the Senegal River to the north forming the frontier with Mauritania and the River Falémé to the east forming the frontier with Senegal. In 2009 the commune had a population of 7,491.
