= Diamou =

- Commune and town
- Location in Mali
- Coordinates: 14°5′19″N 11°15′47″W
- Country: Mali
- Region: Kayes Region
- Cercle: Kayes Cercle

Population (2009 census)
  - Total: 13,793
- Time zone: UTC+0 (GMT)

Traditional conical huts with thatched roofs, Diamou, Mali, 1972

Diamou is a town and commune in the Cercle of Kayes in the Kayes Region of south-western Mali. It is located 45 km from the city of Kayes on the left bank of the Sénégal River. The commune contains 25 villages, and in the 2009 census had a population of 13,793.

== See also ==
- Railway stations in Mali

Note that there is another town in Mali with the same name.
