= Maréna Diombougou =

- Commune and village
- Location in Mali
- Coordinates: 14°34′0″N 11°2′45″W
- Country: Mali
- Region: Kayes Region
- Cercle: Kayes Cercle

Population (2009 census)
  - Total: 14,905
- Time zone: UTC+0 (GMT)

Maréna Diombougou, often simply Maréna, is a village and commune in the Cercle of Kayes in the Kayes Region of south-western Mali. In 2009 the commune had a population of 14,905. It is located in the traditional region of Jambukhu.
