= Samé =

Samé Diomgoma
- Commune and village
- Location in Mali
- Coordinates: 14°29′N 11°34′W
- Country: Mali
- Region: Kayes Region
- Cercle: Kayes Cercle

Population (2009)
  - Total: 12,820
- Time zone: UTC+0 (GMT)

Samé or Samé Diomgoma is a village and commune in the Cercle of Kayes in the Kayes Region of south-western Mali. The commune includes 18 villages and lies to the south of the Senegal River. The Dakar-Niger Railway passes through Samé. In 2009, the commune had a population of 12,820.
