= Guidimakan Keri Kafo =

- Commune
- Location in Mali
- Coordinates: 14°36′45″N 11°50′38″W
- Country: Mali
- Region: Kayes Region
- Cercle: Kayes Cercle

Population (2009 census)
  - Total: 13,647
- Time zone: UTC+0 (GMT)

Guidimakan Keri Kafo is a commune in the Cercle of Kayes in the Kayes Region of south-western Mali, near the border of Senegal and Mauritania. The main town (chef-lieu) of the commune is Gakoura which lies on the north bank of the Senegal River. In 2009 the commune had a population of 13,647. It takes its name from the former state of Guidimakha.
