= Lambidou =

- Commune and village
- Location in Mali
- Coordinates: 14.3136°N 9.5515°W
- Country: Mali
- Region: Kayes Region
- Cercle: Diéma Cercle

Area
  - Total: 333 km^{2} (129 sq mi)

Population (2009 census)
  - Total: 14,947
  - Density: 44.9/km^{2} (116/sq mi)
- Time zone: UTC+0 (GMT)

Lambidou is a rural commune and village in the Cercle of Diéma in the Kayes Region of western Mali. As well as the main village (chef-lieu) of Lambidou, the commune includes the villages of Singoné, Koumarenga and Kary. In the 2009 census the commune had a population of 14,947.

== History ==
Lambidou was a stronghold of the Niakhate family, rulers of the Kingdom of Diarra. After they were deposed by the Diawara dynasty, they retreated to Lambidou and ruled it as a Kafo. It was a prominent regional slave market.
