= Kéméné Tambo =

- Commune
- Location in Mali
- Coordinates: 14°35′N 11°47′W
- Country: Mali
- Region: Kayes Region
- Cercle: Kayes Cercle

Population (2009 census)
  - Total: 21,040
- Time zone: UTC+0 (GMT)

Kéméné Tambo is a commune in the Cercle of Kayes in the Kayes Region of south-western Mali. The main town (chef-lieu) is Ambidédi. The town is on the south bank of the Senegal River. In 2009 the commune had a population of 21,040.
