= Diéoura =

- Commune and village
- Location in Mali
- Coordinates: 14.299°N 9.850°W
- Country: Mali
- Region: Kayes Region
- Cercle: Diéma Cercle

Area
  - Total: 390 km^{2} (150 sq mi)

Population (2009 census)
  - Total: 10,137
  - Density: 26/km^{2} (67/sq mi)
- Time zone: UTC+0 (GMT)

Diéoura is a rural commune and village in the Cercle of Diéma in the Kayes Region of western Mali. The commune contains 5 villages: Diéoura, Tassara, Foulanguédou, Madina-Bambara and Niankan. In the 2009 census the commune had a population of 10,137.
