= Ségala, Mali =

Ségala
- Commune and town
- Location in Mali
- Coordinates: 14°3′45″N 10°58′20″W
- Country: Mali
- Region: Kayes Region
- Cercle: Kayes Cercle

Population (2009)
  - Total: 30,305
- Time zone: UTC+0 (GMT)

Ségala is a small town and commune in the Cercle of Kayes in the Kayes Region of south-western Mali. The commune, which includes 20 villages, had a population of 30,305 in 2009.
