= Somankidi =

- Urban commune and town
- Location in Mali
- Coordinates: 14°32′49″N 11°36′25″W
- Country: Mali
- Region: Kayes Region
- Cercle: Kayes Cercle

Population (2009 census)
  - Total: 6,622
- Time zone: UTC+0 (GMT)

Somankidi or Somankidy is a small town and urban commune in the Cercle of Kayes in the Kayes Region of south-western Mali. The town lies on the north bank of the Senegal River, 22 km northwest of Kayes. In 2009 the commune had a population of 6,622.
