= Marintoumania =

- Commune and village
- Location in Mali
- Coordinates: 14°35′0″N 10°51′55″W
- Country: Mali
- Region: Kayes Region
- Cercle: Kayes Cercle

Population (2009 census)
  - Total: 6,927
- Time zone: UTC+0 (GMT)

Marintoumania is a village and commune in the Cercle of Kayes in the Kayes Region of south-western Mali. In 2009 the commune had a population of 6,927.
