= Falémé =

- Commune
- Location in Mali
- Coordinates: 14°27′27″N 12°12′0″W
- Country: Mali
- Region: Kayes Region
- Cercle: Kayes Cercle

Population (2009 census)
  - Total: 10,112
- Time zone: UTC+0 (GMT)

Falémé is a commune in the Cercle of Kayes in the Kayes Region of south-western Mali. The main town (chef-lieu) is Diboli. In 2009 the commune had a population of 10,112.
