= Séro Diamanou =

- Commune and town
- Location in Mali
- Coordinates: 14°48′40″N 11°3′45″W
- Country: Mali
- Region: Kayes Region
- Cercle: Kayes Cercle

Area
  - Total: 923 km^{2} (356 sq mi)

Population (2009 census)
  - Total: 23,281
- Time zone: UTC+0 (GMT)

Séro or Séro Diamanou is a small town and commune in the Cercle of Kayes in the Kayes Region of southwestern Mali. The commune contains 18 villages and had a population of 23,281 in 2009.
