= Hawa Dembaya =

- Commune
- Location in Mali
- Coordinates: 14°22′33″N 11°22′0″W
- Country: Mali
- Region: Kayes Region
- Cercle: Kayes Cercle

Population (2009 census)
  - Total: 8,512
- Time zone: UTC+0 (GMT)

Hawa Dembaya is a commune in the Cercle of Kayes in the Kayes Region of south-western Mali. The main village (chef-lieu) is Médine. In 2009 the commune had a population of 8,512.
