= Kouloun =

Kouloun is the name of several places in Africa:

- Kouloun, Guinea
- Kouloun, Mali -commune and city
- Kouloun, Niger

== See also ==
- Kowloon
