= Kabaté =

- Village
- Location in Mali
- Coordinates: 14°30′40″N 11°12′36″W
- Country: Mali
- Region: Kayes Region
- Cercle: Kayes Cercle
- Commune: Colimbiné
- Time zone: UTC+0 (GMT)

Kabaté is the main village (chef-lieu) of the commune of Colimbiné in the Cercle of Kayes in the Kayes Region of south-western Mali.
