= Fégui =

- Commune and village
- Location in Mali
- Coordinates: 14°37′15″N 12°8′55″W
- Country: Mali
- Region: Kayes Region
- Cercle: Kayes Cercle

Population (2009 census)
  - Total: 5,494
- Time zone: UTC+0 (GMT)

Fégui is a town and urban commune in the Cercle of Kayes in the Kayes Region of south-western Mali. The town lies on the bank of the Falémé River that marks the boundary between Mali and Senegal. In 2009 the commune had a population of 5,494.
