= Kayes Cercle =

Coordinates: 14°30′N 11°30′W

Kayes
- Cercle
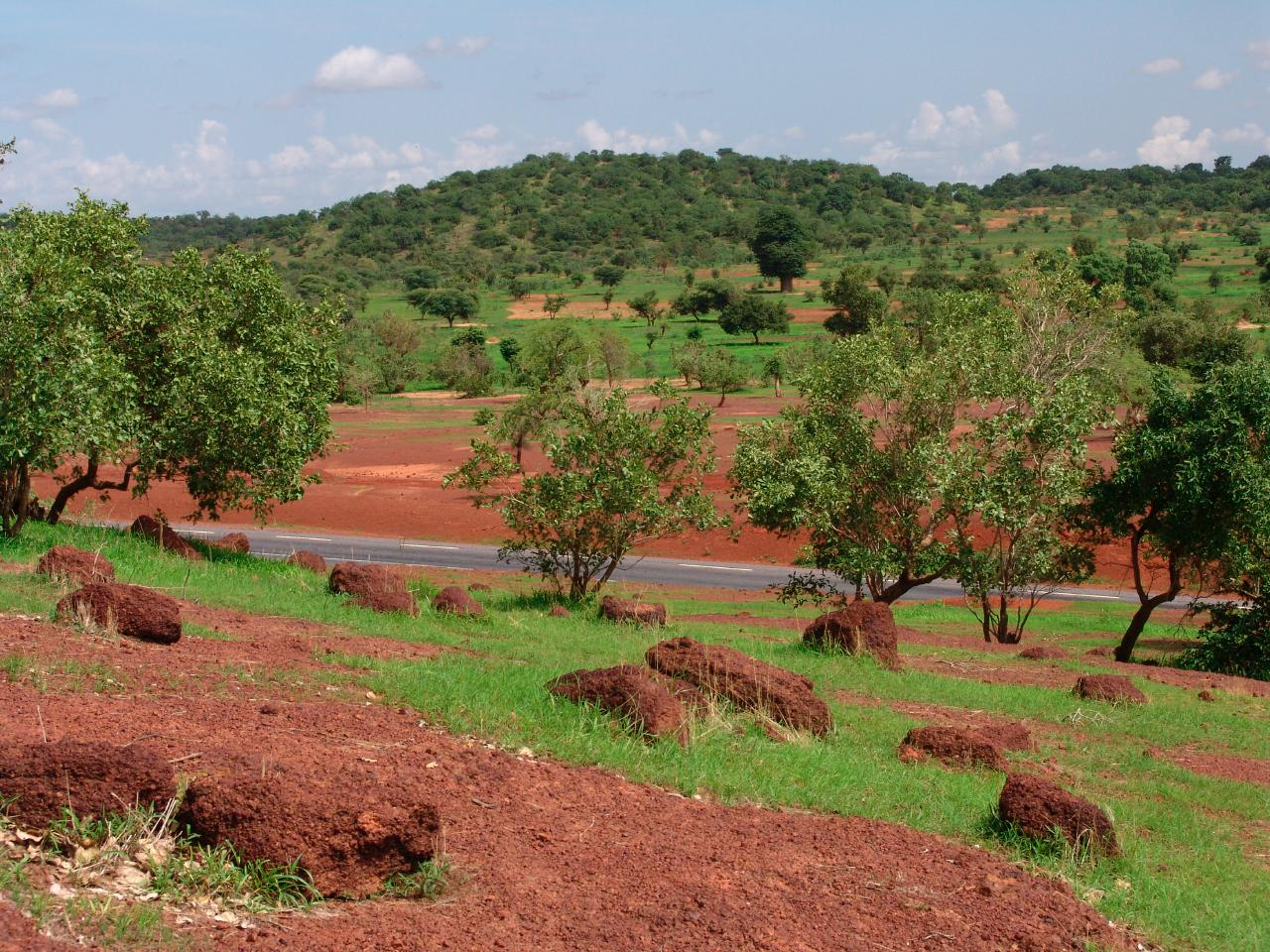
- Sahel forest near Kayes city

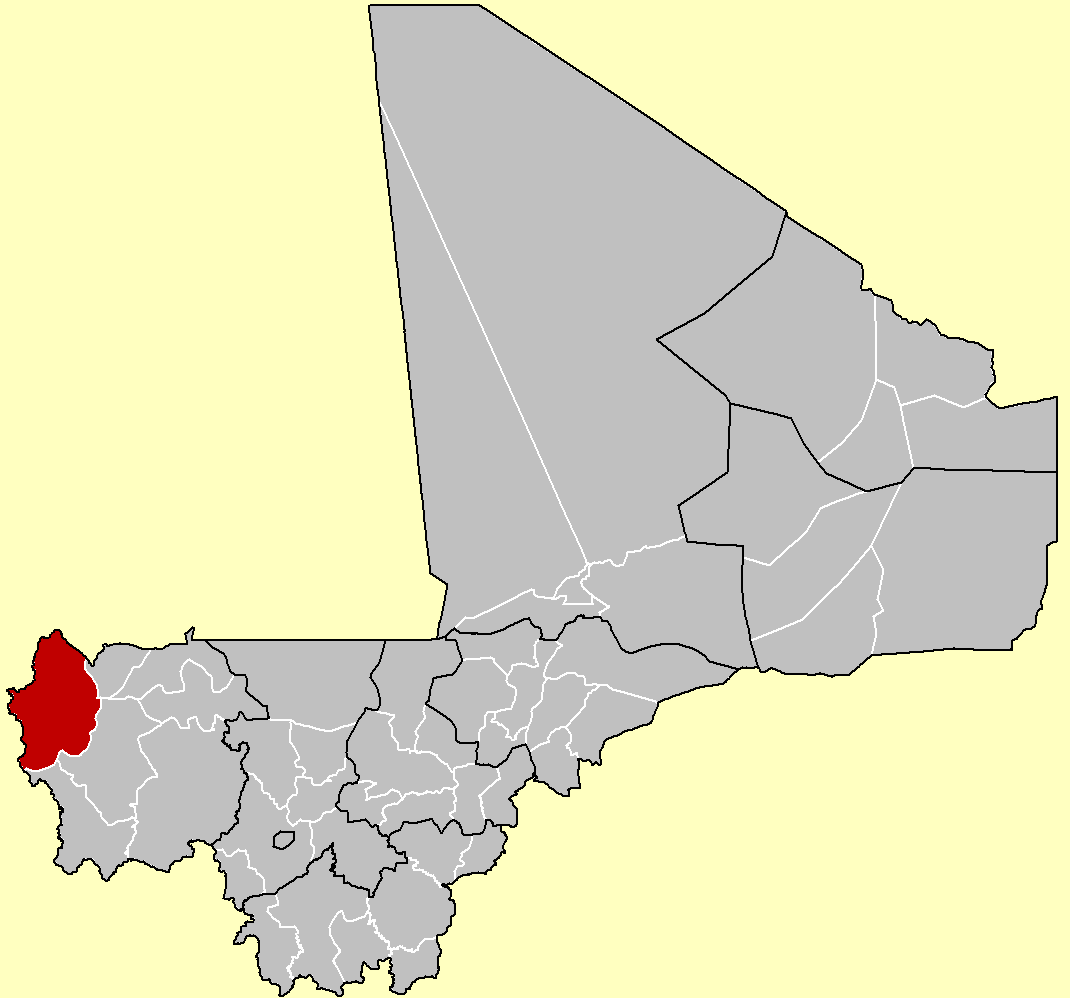
- Location of Kayes Cercle in Mali
- Country: Mali
- Region: Kayes Region
- Capital: Kayes

Area
  - Total: 22,190 km^{2} (8,570 sq mi)

Population (2009 census)
  - Total: 513,362
  - Density: 23.13/km^{2} (59.92/sq mi)
- Time zone: UTC+0 (GMT)

Kayes Cercle is an administrative subdivision of the Kayes Region of Mali. Its seat is the city of Kayes, which is also the capital of its Region and its largest city. The Cercle is further divided into Communes. The city of Kayes is subdivided into Urban Communes and Wards (French: Quartiers). Kayes Cercle's population in 2009 was 513,362.

== Communes ==
Commune	Capital	Population (2009)
Kayes	Kayes	127,368
Bangassi	Bangassi	15,191
Colimbiné	Kabaté	12,101
Diamou	Diamou	13,793
Djélébou	Aourou	24,674
Falémé	Diboli	10,112
Fégui	Fégui	5,494
Gory Gopela	Gory Gopela	7,712
Gouméra	Gouméra	2,770
Guidimakan Keri Kafo	Gakoura	13,647
Hawa Dembaya	Médine	8,512
Karakoro	Teichibe	14,813
Kéméné Tambo	Ambidédi	21,040
Khouloum	Khouloum	13,594
Kouniakary	Kouniakary	8,135
Koussané	Koussané	23,048
Liberté Dembaya	Diala Banlieue	13,074
Logo	Kakoulou	13,873
Maréna Diombougou	Maréna Diombougou	14,905
Marintoumania	Marintoumania	6,927
Sadiola	Sadiola	39,305
Sahel	Bafarara	11,630
Samé Diomgoma	Samé	12,820
Ségala	Ségala	30,305
Séro Diamanou	Séro	23,281
Somankidi	Somankidi	6,622
Sony	Lany Tounka	11,125
Tafacirga	Tafacirga	7,491
