= Hostage schools =

French colonial institutions

Hostage schools were educational institutions established by the French colonizers in Senegal and French Sudan where the sons of chiefs and notables were forcibly recruited to be monitored and trained to become auxiliaries of colonial power. The first hostage school was established in Saint-Louis in Senegal by Governor Faidherbe in 1855.

== Tools of colonial imperialism ==
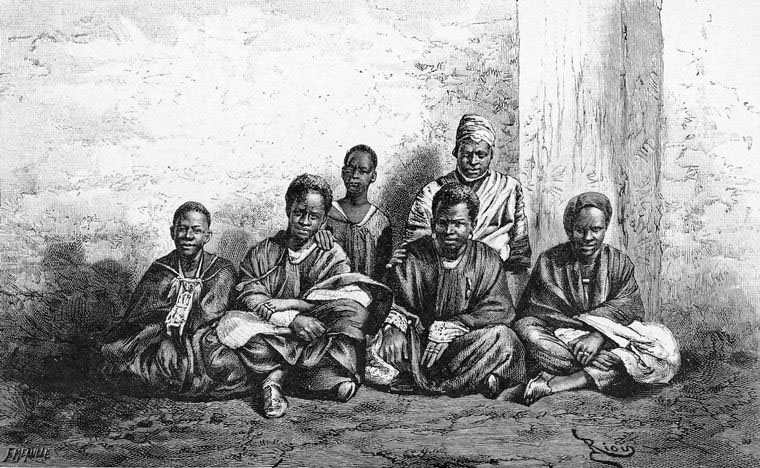
Children of the School of Hostages created in Saint-Louis, Senegal by Faidherbe (engraving by Édouard Riou, 1889).

=== Context ===
Colonization is driven by several factors. First, there is the economic aspect: Europeans want to exploit the resources of the African continent. The second aspect is demographic: seeing the population increase significantly, explorers want to discover new lands to settle in. Finally, one of the most important aspects, which still sparks debates today, is the cultural aspect. Indeed, the conquerors want to impose their way of life, beliefs, and cultures on their colonies.

=== Objectives of the "hostage school" ===
This is where the "hostage school" comes into play. It is intended for the sons of village chiefs and notables whom the governor has brought back from his military campaigns. Louis Faidherbe aims to instill French culture and values in these children. Their detention also allows the colonizers to maintain a certain order, as it dissuades the families of the "hostages" from rebelling. It reflects the need to have an African elite educated in the European manner and capable of serving as an interface with the population. Later, the school is explicitly renamed "school for sons of chiefs and interpreters". Some consider that it still exists today, but instead of being imposed, it is entrenched. This is reflected in the fact that parents enroll their children themselves in schools that are reproductions of the colonial system.

== History ==
It was established in 1861, then closed due to budgetary constraints on 1 January 1872. The school reopened on 31 March 1892, under a different name: College of Sons of Chiefs and Interpreters.

In 1902, the institution moved to a new building located on Ballay Avenue. The following year, it had 59 students.

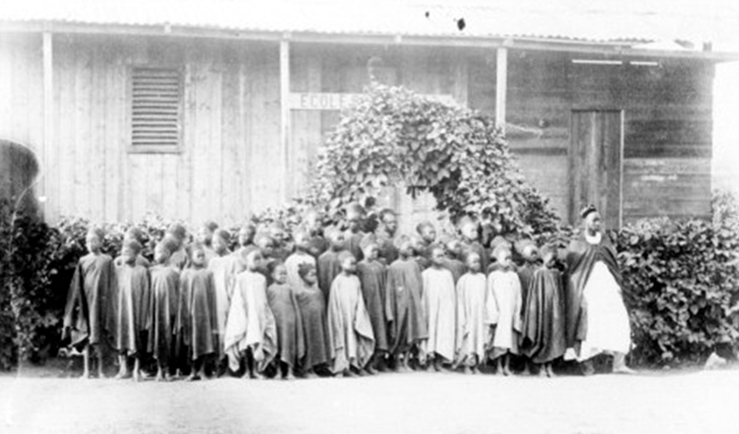
Children of the School of Hostages created in Kayes (Mali) by Gallieni

Colonel Gallieni also established a School of Hostages in Kayes in Mali.

== The school of hostages in French Sudan and Senegal ==
=== In french sudan (present-day mali) ===
At the end of the 19th century, French Sudan was governed by military forces. Kita saw the first school established in 1884. The French entry into Sudan was easy and quick. The first difficulty they encountered was language and communication with local populations. Moreover, the interpreters on-site were not able to facilitate communication, as they themselves did not master the Sudanese languages, and even their mastery of the French language was approximate.

All these elements prompted the colonizers to open the first schools. The school, which was supposed to teach the French language, quickly became a tool of imperialism. The recommendations of Lieutenant Colonel Humbert prove this: "The future of French Sudan depends largely on how successfully we will have shaped the populations that inhabit it...". This project came directly from Paris. It was Joseph Gallieni who came up with the idea of teaching French at each post through a non-commissioned officer. The beginnings were difficult for the schools.

For example, in Kita, the students who were supposed to be present at the start of the term were not there. It was only eight days later that everything returned to normal with the hypocritical cooperation of the parents, who were not very favorable but were forced to accept due to the advantages offered to their children, particularly in terms of health. In 1888, there were four schools in Sudan: in Kayes, Bamako, Koundou, and Bafoulabé. All these cities were relatively rich posts. By the end of 1889, recruiting students and financing schools became much easier. However, some commanding officers in charge of the children were not capable, and thus the teaching of French was slowed down.

School supplies were largely lacking. Senior commanders then took care of supplying the schools. The provided material remained in the spirit of the "hostage school", as it was similar to that used in schools in Paris, such as the subjects studied, such as arithmetic and French history. The level of the students was relatively good. A large number of students were retained, while others were dismissed. They were not allowed to speak in any language other than French, to improve their practice and to break the habit of using their mother tongue. After a year, the colonists began to draw from them the personnel they needed, for the telegraph or as interpreters. In 1890, the post schools were officially abolished. However, the children were not returned to their parents. The most talented children and those of political interest were kept, while others were taken as trainees. In the second half of the decade, the school came under the control of Edgard de Trentinian. At this time, the schools experienced mediocre results. There were five types of schools: the school run by a European teacher, the circle school, the professional school where students learn manual trades, the missionary school whose role is to introduce Christianity at the expense of Islam.

=== In Senegal ===
The same phenomenon occurred in Senegal, first in the city of Saint-Louis in 1855. In Senegal, chiefs sent slaves to schools instead of sending their own children, as this would provoke social advancement for the slaves. Louis Faidherbe encouraged officials and missionaries to first have a minimum command of local languages. Faidherbe conquered Senegal militarily by facing El Hadj Omar. After the conquest, he sought to pacify and ease tensions with local traditional chiefs and to train interpreters who served as intermediaries between the two parties. All of this constitutes a colonization program where education plays an important role. Here too, as for French Sudan, the French language is imposed as the only language. The school in Saint-Louis saw its doors closed in 1871, only to reopen in 1893 under a more diplomatic name, "the school for sons of chiefs and interpreters". To attract children of Muslim religions, Faidherbe created a secular school in 1857. He then opened primary schools in other municipalities, with Saint-Louis seeing a secondary school open in 1884. The schools ensured the assimilation of European norms, with French books being used as in French Sudan. Thus, precolonial Senegalese culture was set aside. due to the traditional and religious norms that had been instilled in them and did not align with French norms. They referred to themselves as "assimilated" or "evolved," and some even became French citizens.

=== Former students ===
- Yoro Dyao

== See also ==
- Education in Senegal
- History of Senegal
- History of Mali
- French West Africa

=== Bibliography ===
- Denise Bouche, "Les écoles françaises au Soudan à l'époque de la conquête. 1884–1900", in Cahiers d'études africaines, vol. 6, No. 22, 1966, p. 228-267.
- Yves Hazemann, "Un outil de la conquête coloniale : l'École des otages de Saint-Louis", Contributions à l'histoire du Sénégal, Cahier du CRA (Centre de recherches africaines) No. 5, 1987, p. 135-160,
- Gerti Hesseling, "L'assimilation culturelle : “Nos ancêtres les Gaulois"", in Histoire politique du Sénégal : institutions, droit et société, Karthala, Paris, 1985, p. 135-137 ISBN 9782865371181
