= Bangassi =

- Commune and town
- Location in Mali
- Coordinates: 14°29′36″N 11°30′24″W
- Country: Mali
- Region: Kayes Region
- Cercle: Kayes Cercle

Population (2009 census)
  - Total: 15,191
- Time zone: UTC+0 (GMT)

Bangassi is a town and commune in the Cercle of Kayes in the Kayes Region of south-western Mali. In 2009 the commune had a population of 15,191.
