= Gouméra =

- Commune and town
- Location in Mali
- Coordinates: 14°33′27″N 11°17′55″W
- Country: Mali
- Region: Kayes Region
- Cercle: Kayes Cercle

Population (2009 census)
  - Total: 2,770
- Time zone: UTC+0 (GMT)

Gouméra is a village and urban commune in the Cercle of Kayes in the Kayes Region of south-western Mali. In 2009 the commune had a population of 2,770.
