= Fatao =

- Urban commune and town
- Location in Mali
- Coordinates: 14.326°N 9.532°W
- Country: Mali
- Region: Kayes Region
- Cercle: Diéma Cercle

Population (2009 census)
  - Total: 9,239
- Time zone: UTC+0 (GMT)

Fatao is an urban commune and small town in the Cercle of Diéma in the Kayes Region of western Mali. In the 2009 census the commune had a population of 9,239.
