= Gathiary =

- Village and commune
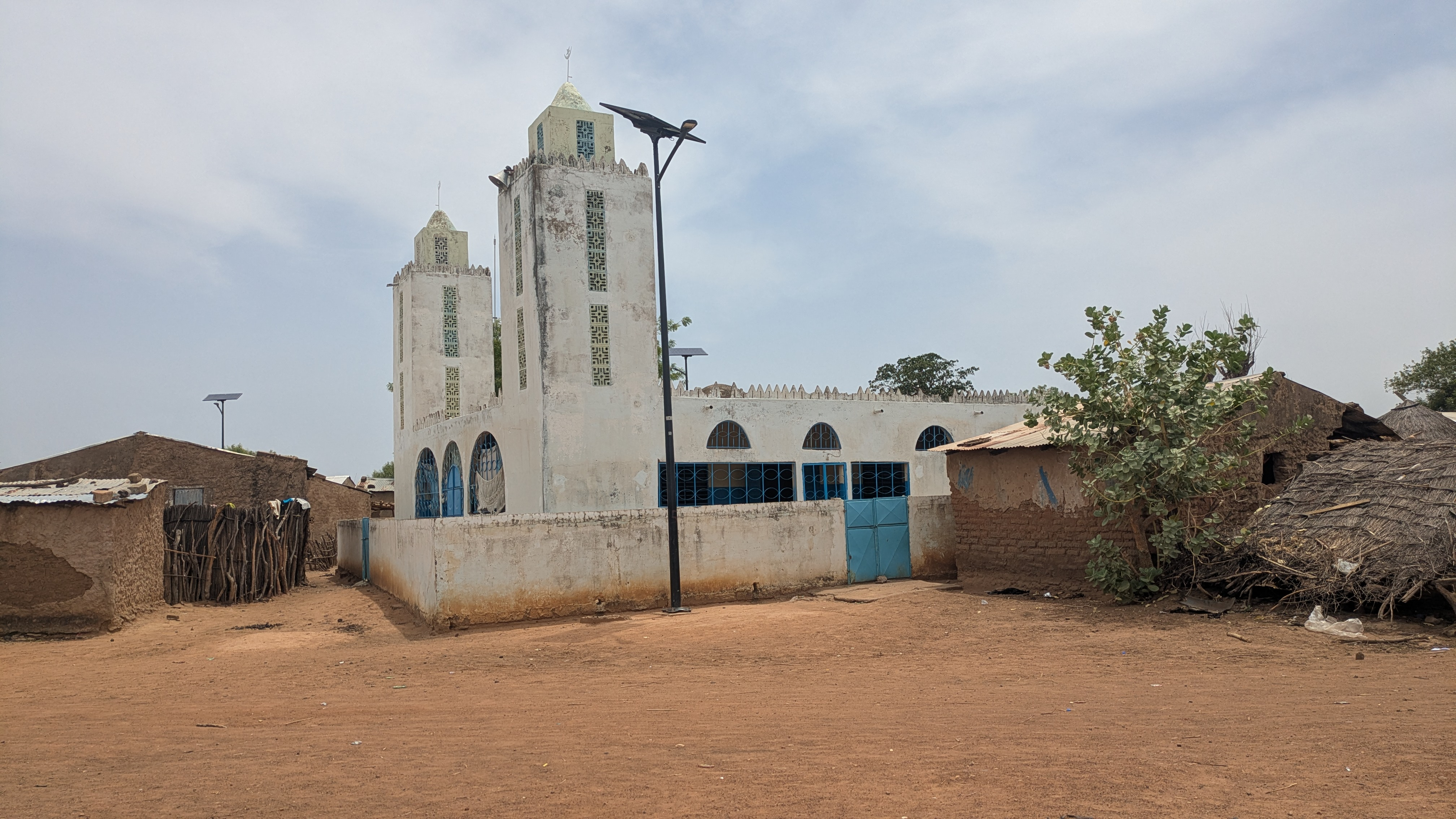
- The Mosque in the center of Gathiary

- Location within Senegal
- Coordinates: 14.30826°N 12.10483°W
- Country: Senegal
- Region: Tambacounda
- Department: Bakel

Area
  - Village and commune: 588.2 km^{2} (227.1 sq mi)

Population (2023 census)
  - Village and commune: 3,973
  - Density: 6.755/km^{2} (17.49/sq mi)
- Time zone: UTC+0 (GMT)

Gathiary is a town and commune in Tambacounda Region of eastern Senegal, lying on the Malian border.
