= Koussané =

Town and commune in Mali

- Commune and town
- Location in Mali
- Coordinates: 14°53′5″N 11°14′0″W
- Country: Mali
- Region: Kayes Region
- Cercle: Kayes Cercle

Population (2009 census)
  - Total: 23,048
- Time zone: UTC+0 (GMT)

Koussané is a town and commune in the Cercle of Kayes in the Kayes Region of south-western Mali. In 2009, the commune had a population of 23,048.

It is located near the Kolinbiné River. There is an archaeological deposit in the town, and has cave paintings dated to 2000 BCE.
