= Mali–Senegal border =

International border

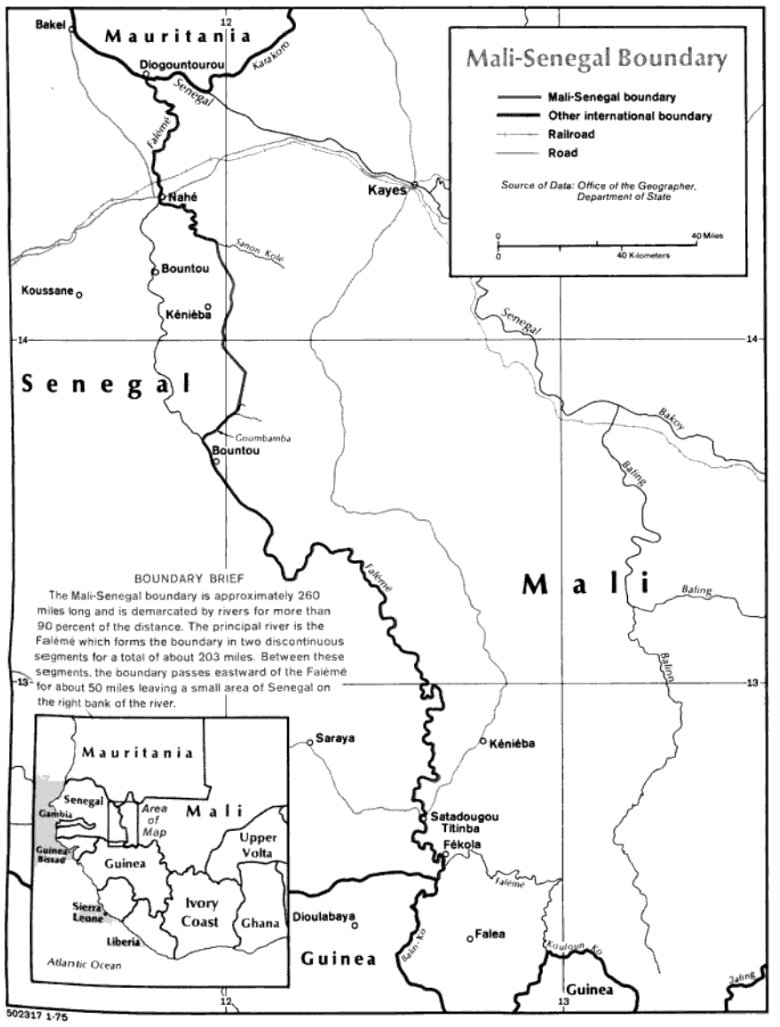
Map of the Mali-Senegal border

The Mali–Senegal border is 489 km (or 304 mi) in length and runs from the tripoint with Mauritania in the north to the tripoint with Guinea in the south.

== Description ==
The border begins in the north at the tripoint with Mauritania at the confluence of the Senegal River and Falémé River. It then follows the latter for some distance southwards, before proceeding overland for a stretch, before rejoining the Falémé, which it then follows down to the tripoint with Guinea.

== History ==
France had begun settling on the coast of modern Senegal in the 17th century, gradually extending their rule further inland during the mid-1800s onward. The areas east of the Falémé river (i.e. roughly modern Mali, Burkina Faso and Niger) were originally under Senegalese administration as Upper Senegal, but were split off as French Sudan in 1893. Both Senegal and French Sudan later became constituent of the federal colony of French West Africa (Afrique occidentale française, abbreviated AOF). The boundary between French Sudan and Senegal was drawn up on 16 June 1895.

As the movement for decolonisation grew in the post-Second World War era, France gradually granted more political rights and representation for their sub-Saharan African colonies, culminating in the granting of broad internal autonomy to French West Africa in 1958 within the framework of the French Community. Eventually, in 1960, both Senegal and Mali were granted full independence, originally as the short-lived Mali Federation.

== Settlements near the border ==
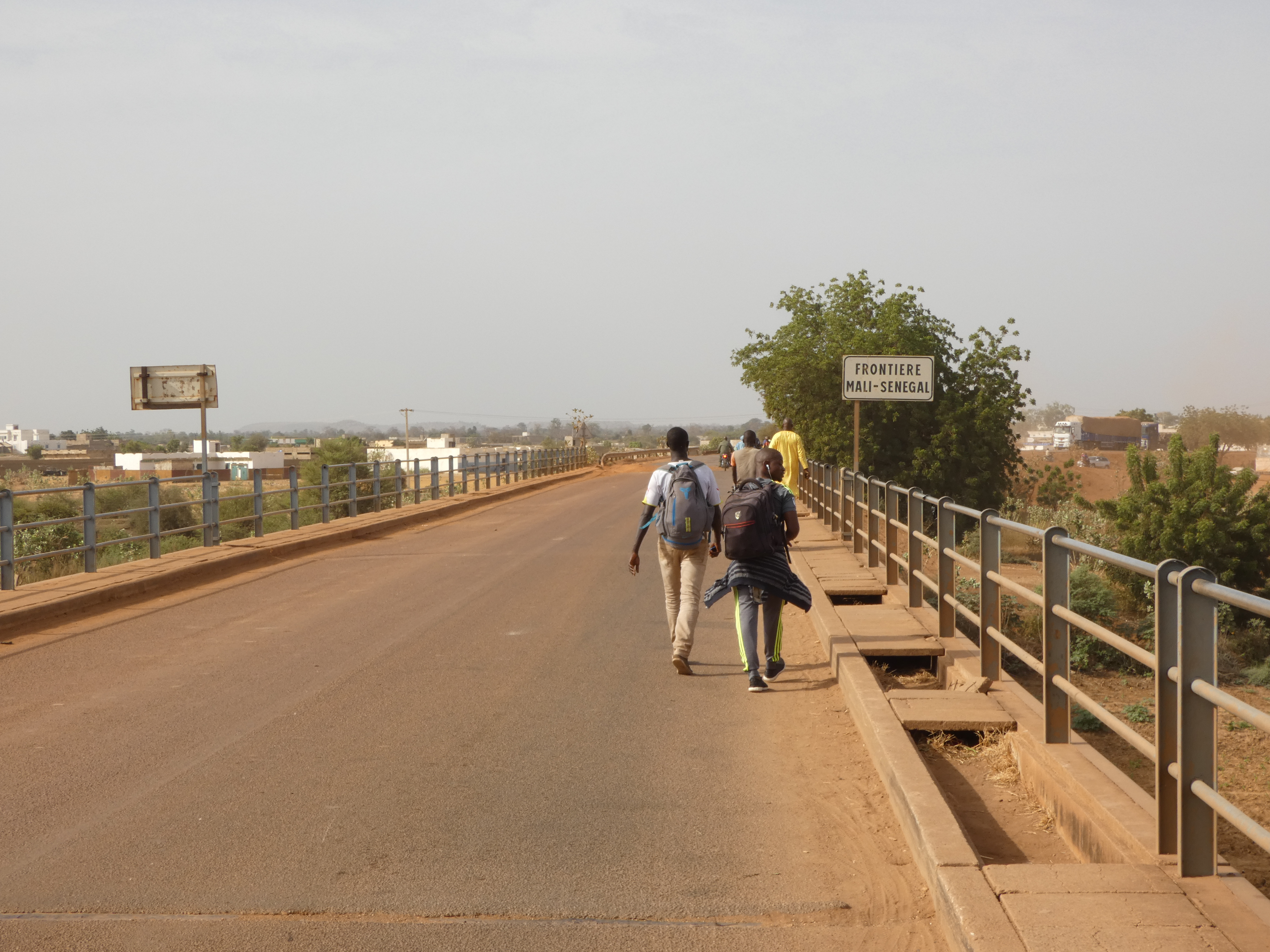
Border crossing at Kidira

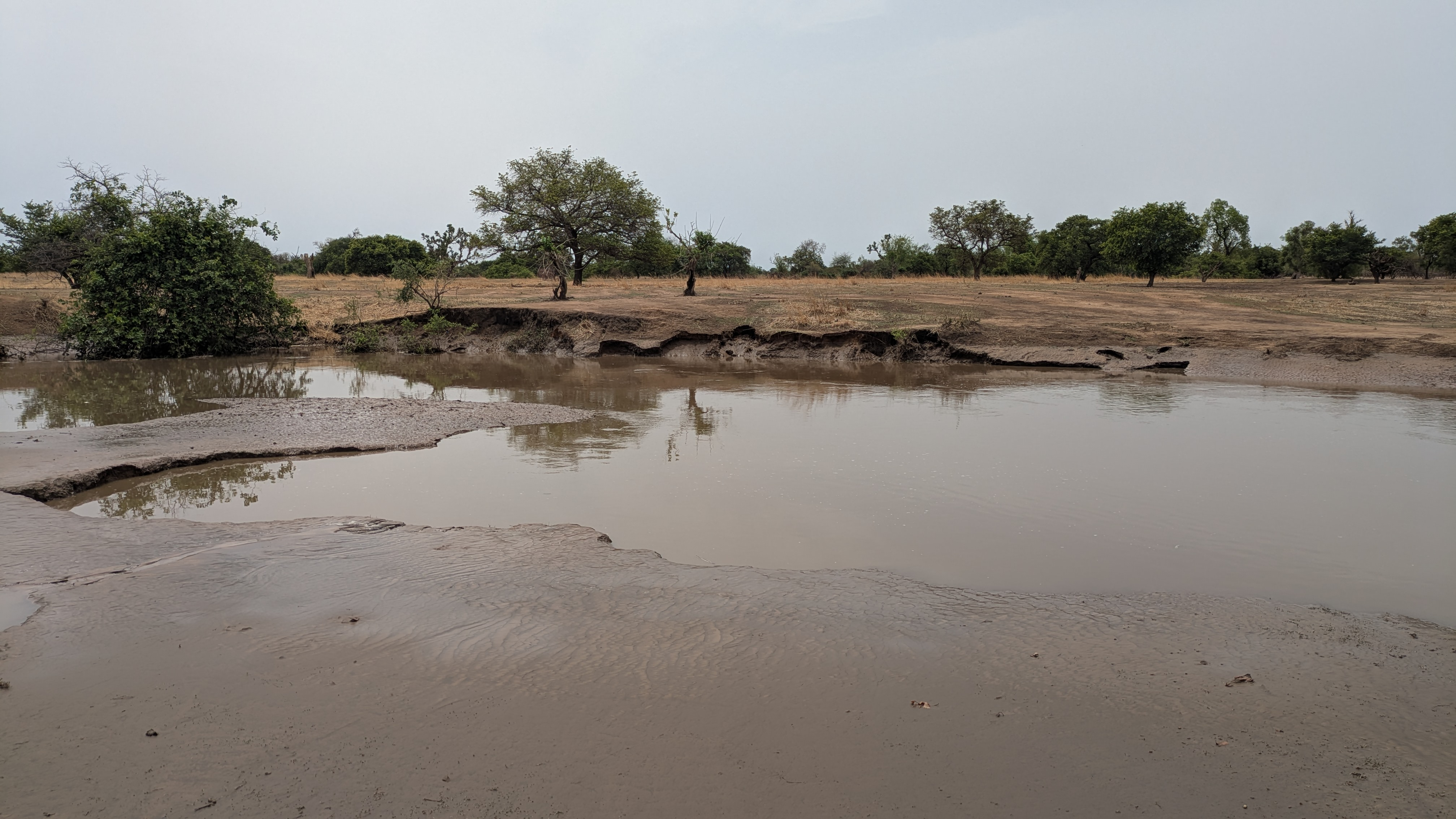
The Sanoukhole stream at Gathiary, part of the Senegal-Mali border

=== Mali ===
- Fégui
- Dakassenou
- Naye
- Gourbassi
- Satadougou
- Diboli
- Kéniéba

=== Senegal ===
- Aroundou
- Gathiary
- Kidira
- Sereto Saboussire
- Sonkounkou

== Border crossing ==
There are two main crossings – at Kidira (SEN)-Diboli (MLI) and at Moussala (MLI).

== See also ==
- Mali–Senegal relations
