= Khouloum =

- Commune and village
- Location in Mali
- Coordinates: 14°27′0″N 11°22′15″W
- Country: Mali
- Region: Kayes Region
- Cercle: Kayes Cercle

Population (2009 census)
  - Total: 18,994
- Time zone: UTC+0 (GMT)

Khouloum is a village and commune in the Cercle of Kayes in the Kayes Region of south-western Mali. In 2009 the commune had a population of 18,994.
