= Falémé River =

Coordinates: 14.7637°N 12.241°W

Falémé River Rivière Falémé (French)
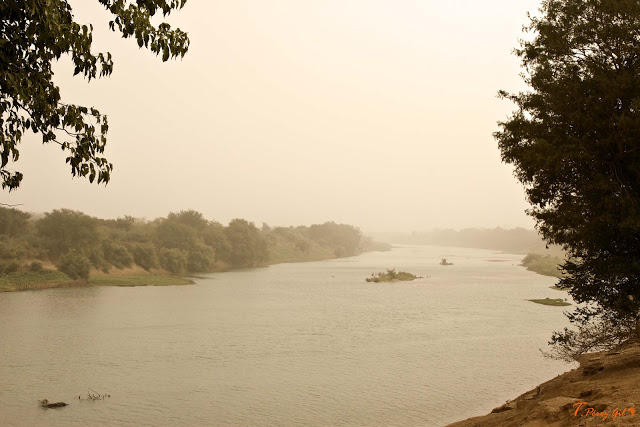
- Falémé River

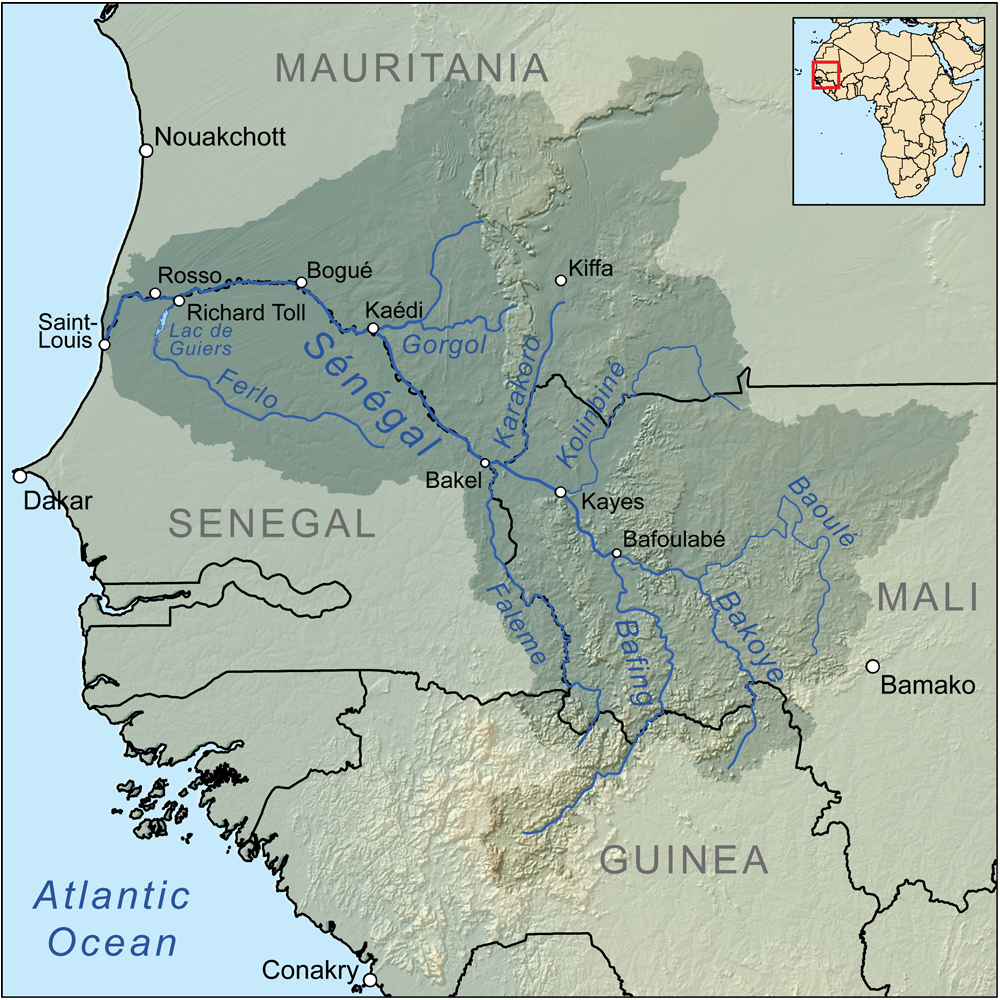
- Map of the Senegal River drainage basin including Falémé

Location
- Countries: Senegal; Mali; Guinea

Physical characteristics
- Mouth
  - location: Atlantic Ocean

Falémé River at Kidira

Average monthly flow (m^{3}/s) at the Kidira hydrometric station over the period 1904-1984

The Falémé River (French: Rivière Falémé) is a river in West Africa. The Falémé arises in northern Guinea and flows in a north-northeast direction to Mali, forming a short portion of the border between Guinea and Senegal. It turns north and then forms a portion of the border between Mali and Senegal, before joining the Sénégal River 50 km upstream of the town of Bakel in Senegal.

== Description ==
The Falémé River is around 650 km in length and drains a basin of 28,900 km^{2}. Its source is in the northern part of the Fouta Djallon highlands at an altitude of 800 m. Most of the rainfall on the highlands occurs between May and October as a result of the West African Monsoon. August is normally the wettest month. The flow of the river is highly seasonal, with the maximum occurring during September and very little flow between December and June. The average annual discharge of the river over the period 1904-1984 was 6.59 km^{3}.

== Mining ==
There are iron ore deposits in Senegal near the headwaters of this river. More recently there has been a gold rush around the village of Diabougou in Senegal and very near the Mali border.

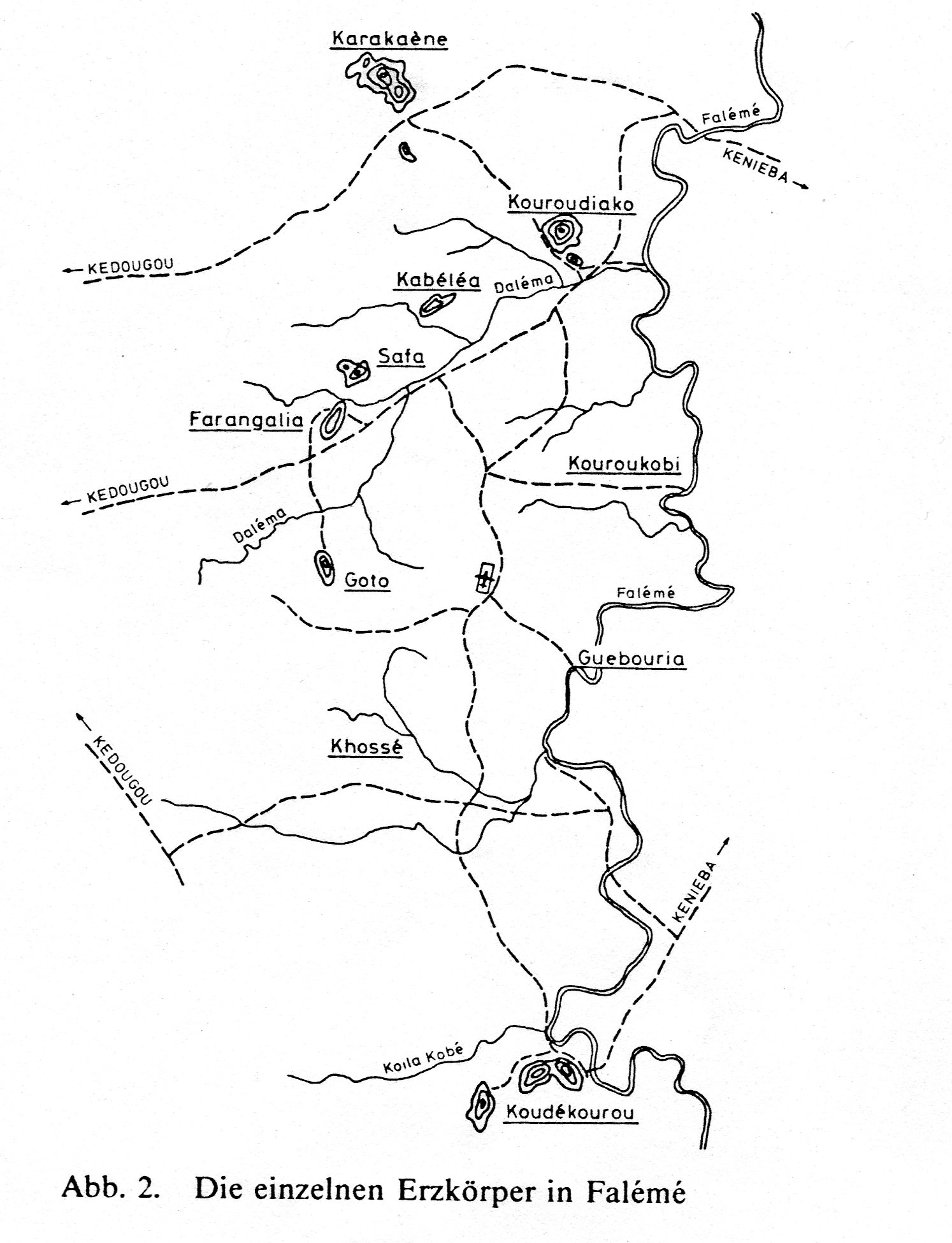
Iron ore deposits in the Falémé River region of Senegal, 1981.

Two men are drying their washed clothes on a bank of the Falémé River at the Mali-Senegal border, 1984.

The Falémé River with bushes on its banks at the Mali-Senegal border, 1984.

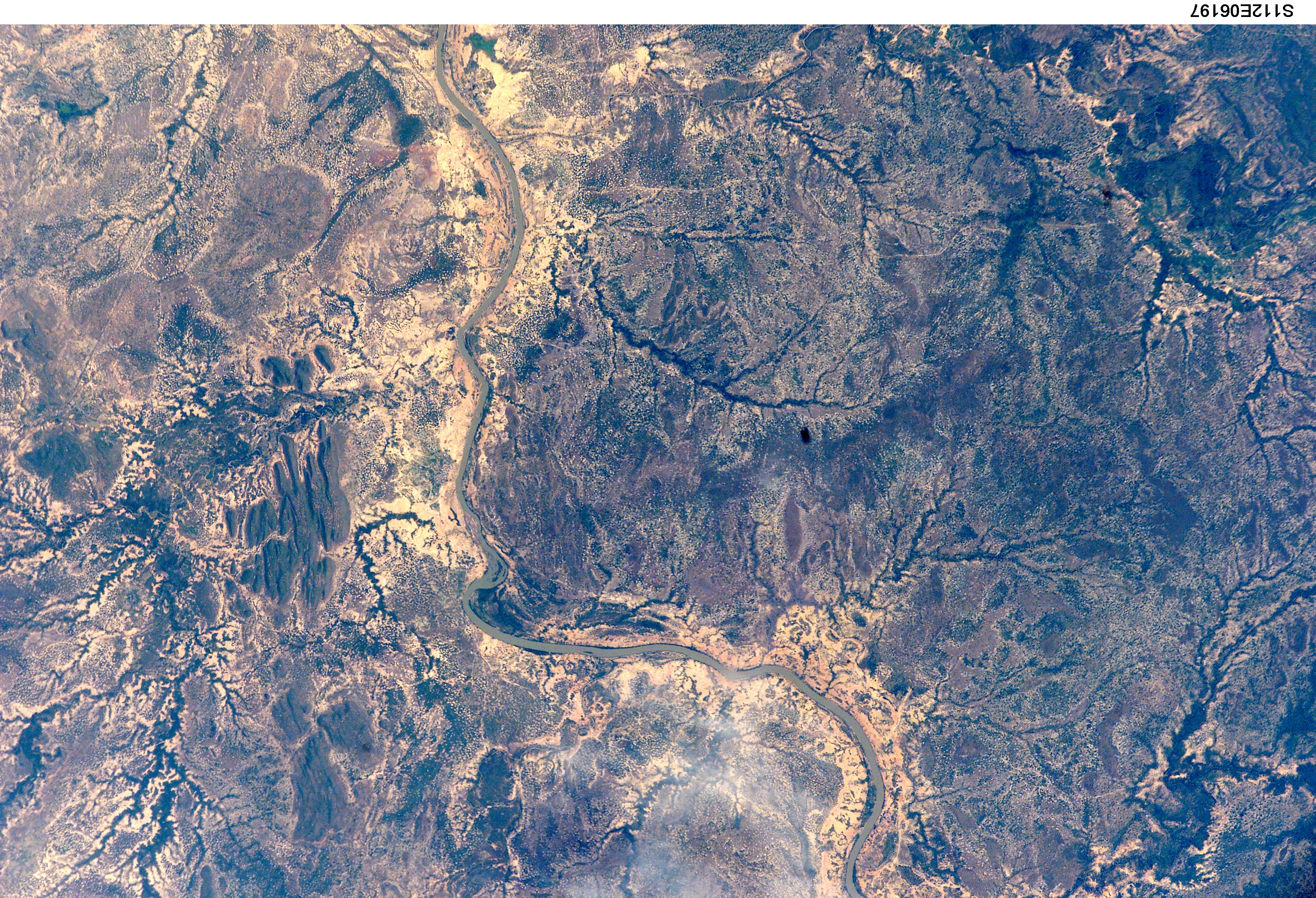
The Falémé River in Senegal near the Mali border photographed from space by Space Shuttle Mission STS-112, October 2002.

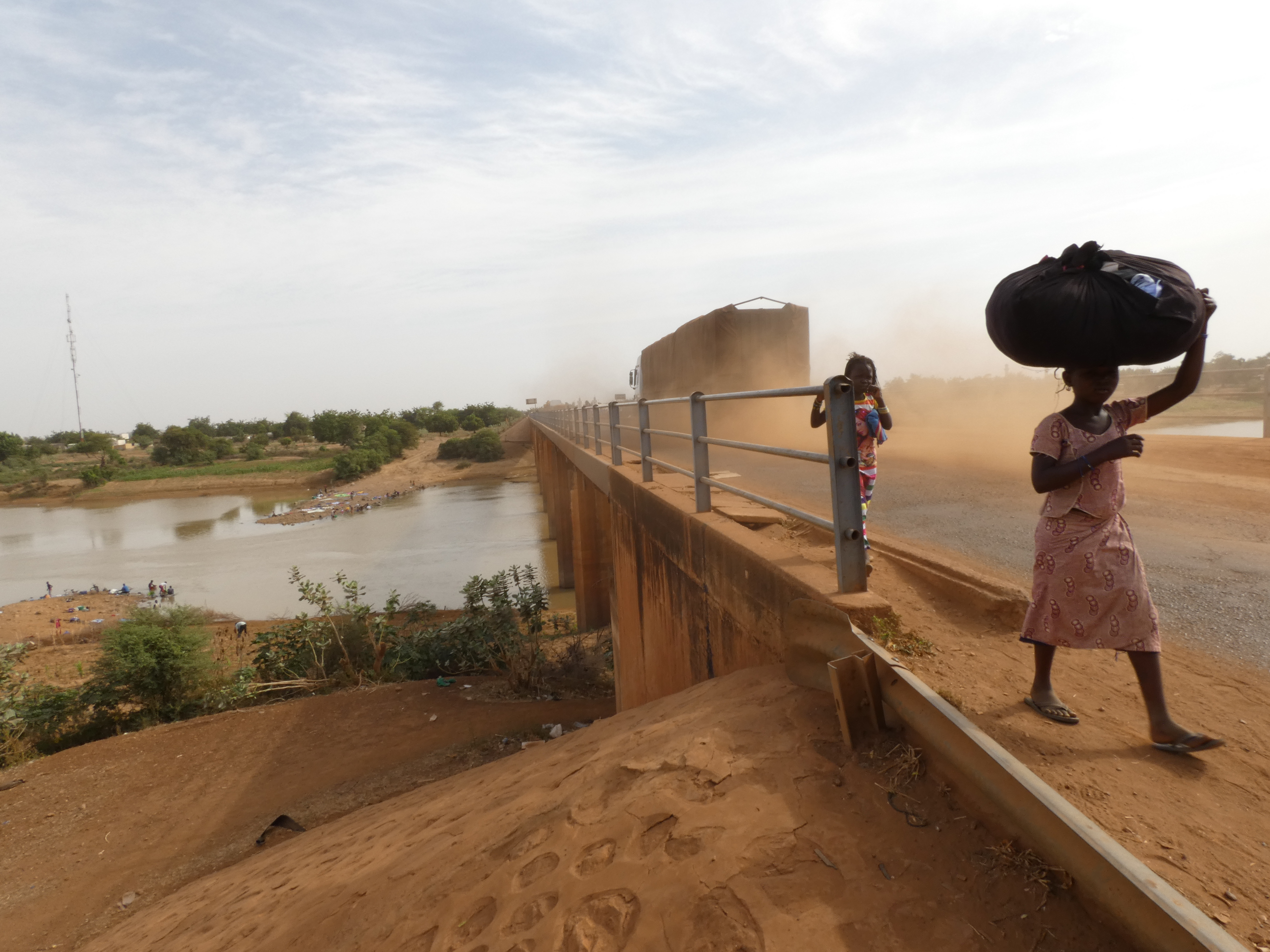
Two young pedestrians cross the road bridge from Mali to Kidira, Senegal. Left the ford in the river Falémé, 2017.
