= Kayes =

Kayes Kayi, Xaayi
- Commune and city
- Location within Mali
- Coordinates: 14°27′N 11°26′W
- Country: Mali
- Region: Kayes
- Cercle: Kayes Cercle
- Town founded: 1880s
- Elevation: 33 m (108 ft)

Population (2009 census)
  - Total: 127,368
- Time zone: UTC+0 (GMT)

Kayes (IPA: [kaj]; Bambara: ߞߊ߬ߦߋ߫, romanized: Kàyǐ; Soninke: Xaayi) is a city in western Mali on the Sénégal River with a population of 127,368 at the 2009 census. Kayes is the capital of the administrative region of the same name. The city is located 420 kilometres (260 mi) northwest of the capital Bamako.

== Toponymy ==
There are multiple possible etymologies of the name 'Kayes', all derived from the Soninke language. These include: the word kharré, which describes a low humid place that floods in rainy season; the word kayé, a type of grass; khayé, the Soninke name for the rhun palm.

== History ==
The area around Kayes was historically a part of the Soninke states of Diarra and Gajaaga. The important trading center of Goundiourou, known in Arabic sources as Ghiyaru, was just across the river, and was later rebuilt just south of the modern city.

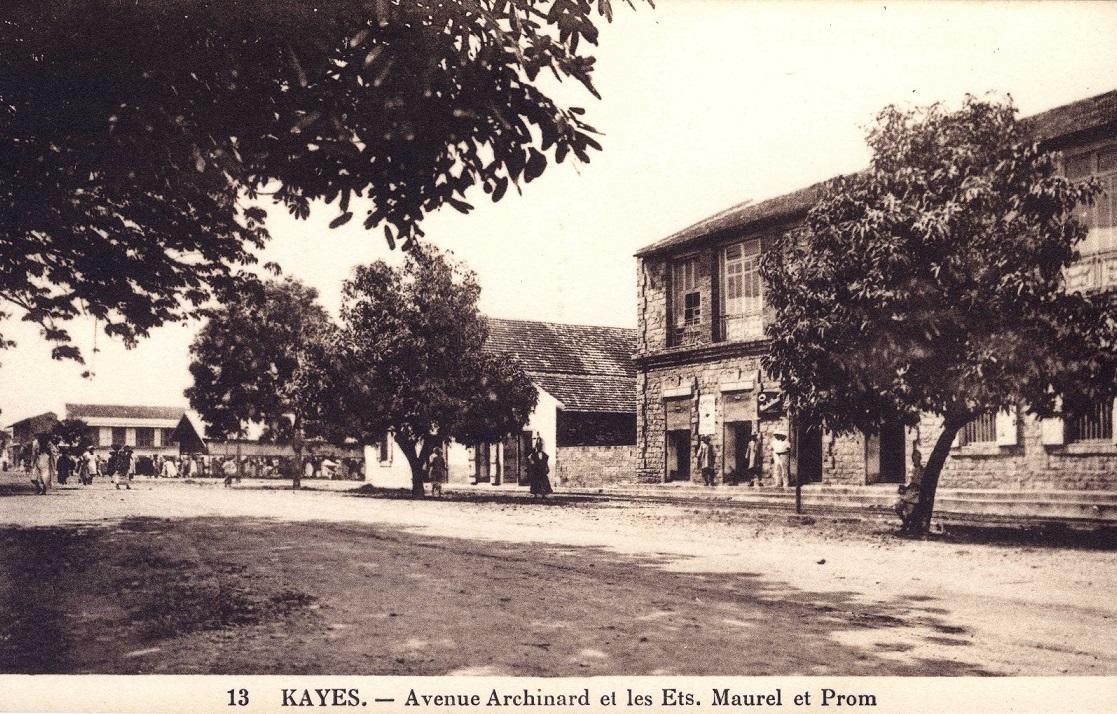
Kayes in 1910

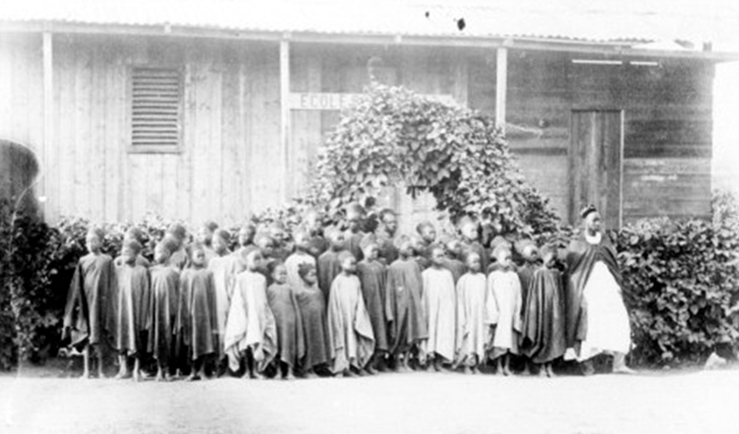
Children at the Kayes hostage school, founded by Joseph Gallieni (1887–1888)

Kayes itself was founded in the second half of the 19th century. Guéssé Sidy, a prince of Khasso, established a base there to protect the western approaches to the kingdom's capital, Medina.

Prior to French colonial expansion, Kayes was still a small village. In 1881 the French chose it as the site for a fort and barracks, the headquarters of the colonial presence in the central Sudan, as Medina was difficult to access by boat. By 1886 the post had been fortified, and by 1889 a market town of 6,000 people had grown up around it.

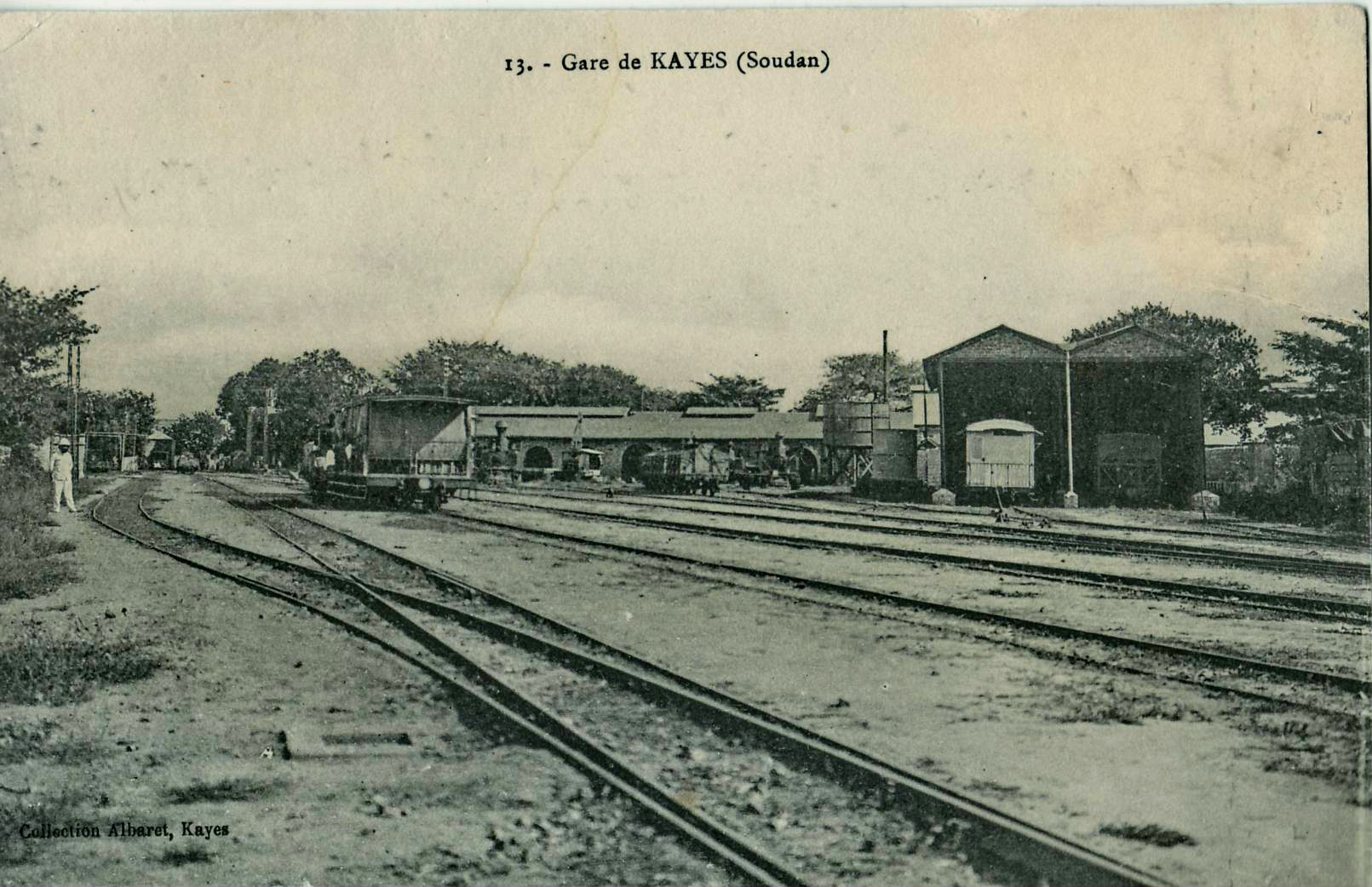
Early 20th-century view of the railway station

From the beginning, the French began building a railway linking Kayes, the furthest point reachable by boat on the Senegal River, with Bafoulabe upstream. This stretch was completed in 1890, and reached to Bamako in 1904. A rail link to Thiès was begun in 1907 which, interrupted by the First World War, was completed in 1923.

In 1892, Kayes became the capital of the French Sudan; Bamako replaced it as the capital, first of the state of Haut Sénégal-Niger on October 17, 1899, then as the capital of all of French Sudan in 1908.

During World War II, a portion of Poland's gold reserve, evacuated during the German-Soviet invasion in 1939, was stored for several years in Kayes before being transported to the United States in 1944, to be returned to Poland after the occupation and war ended.

On 1 July 2025, Jama'at Nasr al-Islam wal-Muslimin launched an attack on the city, as well as a few other nearby areas. The Malian Army reported that they successful countered the assaults and over 80 militants were killed.

== Economy and transport ==
Kayes lies on the Route Nationale 1 (RN1) highway and is 612 km (380 mi) by road from Bamako and 96 km (60 mi) from the border with Senegal. The town has an international airport (Kayes Airport), and lies on the Dakar-Niger Railway which offered regional passenger train service to Bamako three times a week via Kati and Diamou as of 2013. The area is rich in gold and iron.

== Climate ==
Kayes has a hot semi-arid climate (Köppen climate classification BSh). The climate is subject to the West African Monsoon with all the rainfall occurring between June and October. August is the wettest month. There is almost no rainfall during the other seven months of the year. The total annual rainfall is around 650 millimetres or 26 inches. Kayes is nicknamed the "pressure cooker of Africa" due to its extreme heat; the town is surrounded by iron-rich mountains which contribute to the temperature. The town has been described as the hottest continuously inhabited town in Africa. The average daily high temperature in the city is 36.4 °C (97.5 °F), with temperatures usually peaking in April and May at an average of nearly 42 °C (108 °F).

On 3 April 2024, a temperature of 48.5 °C (119.3 °F) was recorded in Kayes; this is the highest temperature that has ever been reported in Mali.

Climate data for Kayes (1950-2000)
Month	Jan	Feb	Mar	Apr	May	Jun	Jul	Aug	Sep	Oct	Nov	Dec	Year
Record high °C (°F)	—	—	—	48.5 (119.3)	47.9 (118.2)	47.2 (117.0)	—	—	—	—	—	—	48.5 (119.3)
Mean daily maximum °C (°F)	33.6 (92.5)	36.6 (97.9)	39.4 (102.9)	41.7 (107.1)	41.9 (107.4)	38.2 (100.8)	33.6 (92.5)	32.0 (89.6)	33.1 (91.6)	36.1 (97.0)	36.7 (98.1)	33.5 (92.3)	36.4 (97.5)
Mean daily minimum °C (°F)	16.9 (62.4)	19.3 (66.7)	22.2 (72.0)	25.5 (77.9)	28.4 (83.1)	26.6 (79.9)	24.2 (75.6)	23.3 (73.9)	23.2 (73.8)	23.0 (73.4)	20.0 (68.0)	17.2 (63.0)	22.5 (72.5)
Average rainfall mm (inches)	0.0 (0.0)	0.4 (0.02)	0.1 (0.00)	0.6 (0.02)	12.0 (0.47)	82.6 (3.25)	155.2 (6.11)	215.9 (8.50)	140.9 (5.55)	41.2 (1.62)	2.7 (0.11)	1.1 (0.04)	652.7 (25.69)
Average rainy days (≥ 0.1 mm)	0.0	0.0	0.1	0.1	2.8	7.8	12.3	14.8	11.4	4.0	0.1	0.0	53.4
Mean monthly sunshine hours	263.5	250.0	282.1	285.0	279.0	215.0	211.8	223.2	240.0	263.5	264.0	260.6	3,037.7
Source 1: World Meteorological Organization
Source 2: NOAA (sun 1961–1990)

== Area ==
Sites found in and around Kayes include:

- Fort du Médine
- Félou Falls, 15 km (9.3 mi) upstream on the Senegal river
- Gouina Falls, 100 km (62 mi) to the southeast on the Senegal river
- The tata of Koniakari, constructed by El Hadj Umar Tall, 70 km (43 mi) to the northeast
- Lake Magui and Lake Doro, both watered by the Kolimbiné River
- The Manantali Dam

== See also ==
- List of cities in Mali
- Ebola virus disease in Mali
