= Communes of Mali =

Third-level administrative unit in Mali

A commune is the third-level administrative unit in Mali. Mali is divided into ten regions and one capital district (Bamako). These subdivisions bear the name of their principal city. The regions are divided into 56 cercles. The cercles and the district are divided into 703 communes, with 36 urban communes and 667 rural communes, while some larger cercles still contain arrondissements above the commune level, these are organisational areas with no independent power or office. Rural communes are subdivided into villages, while urban communes are subdivided into quartier (wards or quarters). Communes usually bear the name of their principal town. The capital, Bamako, consists of six urban communes. There were initially 701 communes until Law No. 01-043 of 7 June 2001 created two new rural communes in the desert region in the north east of the country: Alata, Ménaka Cercle in the Gao Region and Intadjedite, Tin-Essako Cercle in the Kidal Region.

Not every built up area (which might be described as a town) is a commune, and not every commune (especially rural communes) contains a large town. In most cases where towns and communes coincide, commune borders extend beyond built up areas and are, like the communes of France on which they were based during the colonial period, an administrative structure. Unlike French communes, they are not the lowest level administrative structure of the nation.

Legally, the commune structure was created by Law No. 96-059/AN-RM of 4 November 1996. The communes generally retain the same boundaries as the former arrondissements. Commune affairs are directed by a commune council (conseil communal) of elected members and a commune executive (bureau communal) of the elected mayor and three adjutants. The executive is tasked with carrying out the directives voted by the council. National policies are carried out by a sub-prefect (sous préfet), who also carries out certain of the council's directives over the local arms or national bodies.

The communes are listed below:

Name	Status	Population census 1998-04-17	Population census 2009-04-01
Abeïbara	Cercle	7,629	10,296
Abeïbara	Commune	3,679	4,549
Boghassa	Commune	2,597	3,378
Tinzawatène	Commune	1,087	2,369
Ansongo	Cercle	83,841	131,953
Ansongo	Commune	20,791	30,091
Bara	Commune	9,575	15,092
Bourra	Commune	12,880	18,726
Ouattagouna	Commune	20,983	30,263
Talataye	Commune	8,846	14,023
Tessit	Commune	5,836	13,766
Tin-Hama	Commune	3,487	9,992
Bafoulabé	Cercle	168,731	233,647
Bafoulabé	Commune	15,385	19,766
Bamafele	Commune	12,544	16,180
Diakon	Commune	24,141	33,756
Diallan	Commune	10,146	14,695
Diokeli	Commune	9,893	13,097
Gounfan	Commune	4,423	6,998
Kontela	Commune	14,990	21,510
Koundian	Commune	10,970	13,857
Mahina	Commune	19,070	25,902
Niambia	Commune	4,545	7,431
Oualia	Commune	14,717	20,687
Sidibela	Commune	5,146	7,557
Tomora	Commune	22,761	32,211
Bamako	Capital district	1,016,296	1,810,366
Commune I	Urban commune	195,081	334,886
Commune II	Urban commune	126,353	159,360
Commune III	Urban commune	99,753	128,666
Commune IV	Urban commune	186,200	304,526
Commune V	Urban commune	187,567	413,266
Commune VI	Urban commune	221,342	469,662
Banamba	Cercle	142,160	191,005
Banamba	Commune	23,933	31,880
Ben Kadi	Commune	6,697	9,072
Boron	Commune	30,313	38,106
Duguwolowula	Commune	32,414	43,026
Kiban	Commune	9,079	12,389
Madina Sacko	Commune	17,315	26,143
Sebete	Commune	3,091	4,060
Toubacoro (Toubakoro)	Commune	10,287	14,374
Toukoroba	Commune	9,031	11,955
Bandiagara	Cercle	227,580	313,456
Bandiagara	Urban commune	11,499	17,166
Bara Sara	Commune	10,197	15,033
Borko	Commune	6,458	7,031
Dandoli	Commune	7,200	9,579
Diamnati	Commune	10,462	13,148
Dogani Béré	Commune	3,259	4,419
Doucoumbo	Commune	14,985	20,835
Dourou	Commune	16,663	19,524
Kendé	Commune	4,317	3,726
Kendié	Commune	18,593	25,482
Lowol-Guéou	Commune	5,510	8,957
Metoumou	Commune	11,033	14,016
Ondougou	Commune	4,534	5,657
Pelou	Commune	3,481	4,347
Pignari	Commune	8,889	16,063
Pignari Bana	Commune	18,295	30,079
Sangha	Commune	24,420	30,798
Ségué Iré	Commune	11,187	14,861
Soroly	Commune	5,738	7,296
Timniri	Commune	9,802	17,580
Wadouba	Commune	21,058	27,859
Bankass	Cercle	195,582	264,776
Bankass	Commune	23,377	30,476
Baye	Commune	26,392	38,735
Diallassagou	Commune	16,417	22,709
Dimbal Habé (Dimbal Habbe)	Commune	13,702	17,682
Kani Bozon (Kani-Bonzoni)	Commune	10,522	13,082
Koulogon Habbé	Commune	12,791	14,511
Lessagou Habe	Commune	11,858	15,552
Ouonkoro (Ouenkoro)	Commune	17,161	22,702
Segue	Commune	16,934	22,067
Sokoura	Commune	27,457	38,565
Soubala	Commune	7,361	10,684
Tori	Commune	11,610	18,011
Barouéli	Cercle	157,145	202,866
Barouéli	Commune	31,945	42,862
Boidie	Commune	17,380	22,056
Dougoufie	Commune	7,529	9,260
Gouendo	Commune	8,480	10,588
Kalake	Commune	12,860	16,509
Konobougou	Commune	26,370	37,236
N'Gassola	Commune	4,404	5,660
Sanando	Commune	23,830	32,643
Somo	Commune	6,618	6,875
Tamani	Commune	13,279	13,059
Tesserla	Commune	4,450	6,118
Bla	Cercle	202,295	283,678
Beguene	Commune	9,872	11,900
Bla	Commune	27,568	45,474
Diaramana	Commune	15,235	20,053
Diena	Commune	6,691	9,502
Dougouolo	Commune	7,478	8,711
Falo	Commune	26,306	41,144
Fani	Commune	10,568	13,821
Kazangasso	Commune	6,452	6,001
Kemeni	Commune	10,076	13,422
Korodougou	Commune	8,405	11,336
Koulandougou	Commune	3,502	4,710
Niala	Commune	8,198	10,262
Samabogo	Commune	9,684	13,210
Somasso	Commune	8,428	10,948
Tiemena	Commune	7,956	11,169
Touna	Commune	20,174	30,399
Yangasso	Commune	15,702	21,616
Bougouni	Cercle	307,633	458,546
Bladié-Tiémala	Commune	2,025	4,604
Bougouni	Urban commune	37,360	58,538
Danou	Commune	10,058	13,464
Debelin	Commune	5,135	8,281
Defina	Commune	7,163	8,019
Dogo	Commune	25,567	34,154
Domba	Commune	8,947	13,847
Faradiele	Commune	2,220	2,689
Faragouaran	Commune	7,960	10,525
Garalo	Commune	20,394	32,760
Keleya	Commune	17,566	20,529
Kokele	Commune	5,049	6,477
Kola	Commune	2,724	4,488
Koumantou	Commune	33,987	51,209
Kouroulamini	Commune	4,599	6,245
Meridiela	Commune	9,137	13,858
Ouroun	Commune	4,265	5,545
Sanso	Commune	10,940	19,834
Sibirila	Commune	17,317	30,837
Sido	Commune	12,921	20,822
Syen Toula	Commune	6,768	9,455
Tiémala-Banimonotié	Commune	11,517	16,773
Wola	Commune	9,257	11,382
Yinindougou	Commune	4,470	8,966
Yiridougou	Commune	6,860	9,478
Zantiébougou	Commune	23,427	35,767
Bourem	Cercle	86,168	116,360
Bamba	Commune	21,735	28,616
Bourem	Urban commune	21,227	27,488
Taboye	Commune	16,372	20,641
Tarkint	Commune	7,441	19,099
Téméra	Commune	13,892	20,516
Diéma	Cercle	141,905	211,772
Béma	Commune	19,664	25,429
Diangounté Camara	Commune	20,419	28,467
Dianguirdé	Commune	8,630	11,988
Diéma	Commune	19,297	30,470
Diéoura	Commune	7,921	11,761
Dioumara Koussata	Commune	10,894	16,280
Fassoudébé	Commune	3,731	5,470
Fatao	Urban commune	4,774	8,339
Gomitradougou	Commune	4,111	7,296
Grouméra	Commune	7,154	11,519
Guédébiné	Commune	3,744	5,089
Lakamané	Commune	9,756	15,964
Lambidou	Commune	9,347	14,791
Madiga Sacko	Commune	8,816	13,936
Sansankidé	Commune	3,647	4,973
Dioïla	Cercle	332,972	488,937
Banco (Banko)	Commune	24,596	32,979
Benkadi	Commune	5,921	7,899
Binko	Commune	13,262	19,897
Degnekoro	Commune	7,058	10,082
Diebé	Commune	6,452	8,704
Diédougou	Commune	26,273	35,892
Diouman	Commune	8,047	19,176
Dolendougou	Commune	9,783	14,220
Guegneka	Commune	27,404	48,041
Jèkafo	Commune	4,862	6,641
Kaladougou	Commune	23,823	39,171
Kemekafo	Commune	16,965	24,434
Kerela	Commune	7,224	12,626
Kilidougou	Commune	12,045	15,508
Massigui	Commune	42,665	54,252
Nangola	Commune	13,603	18,605
N'Dlondougou	Commune	14,100	20,993
N'Garadougou	Commune	10,113	15,593
N'Golobougou	Commune	15,204	21,848
Niantjila	Commune	12,151	14,303
Tenindougou	Commune	9,869	14,583
Wacoro	Commune	9,759	15,000
Zan Coulibaly	Commune	11,793	18,490
Diré	Cercle	84,393	109,661
Arham	Commune	2,242	2,819
Binga	Commune	4,011	5,115
Bourem Sidi Amar	Commune	5,724	8,555
Dangha	Commune	7,216	12,905
Diré	Urban commune	13,431	20,337
Garbakoïra	Commune	4,627	5,651
Haibongo	Commune	10,546	14,257
Kirchamba	Commune	3,069	4,120
Kondi	Commune	2,324	3,051
Sareyamou	Commune	12,488	16,946
Tienkour	Commune	4,093	6,527
Tindirma	Commune	4,922	6,477
Tinguereguif	Commune	2,267	2,901
Djenné	Cercle	155,551	208,413
Dandougou Fakala	Commune	8,481	9,410
Derary	Commune	5,771	6,962
Djenné	Urban commune	19,558	26,267
Fakala	Commune	25,177	33,714
Femaye	Commune	13,043	16,324
Kéwa	Commune	13,835	22,025
Madiama	Commune	8,805	11,833
Néma-Badenyakafo	Commune	33,619	46,399
Niansanarie	Commune	3,863	4,743
Ouro Ali	Commune	8,261	10,826
Pondori	Commune	7,236	9,991
Togue Mourari	Commune	7,902	9,919
Douentza	Cercle	155,831	246,625
Dallah	Commune	6,337	8,103
Dangol-Boré	Commune	18,028	26,540
Débéré	Commune	5,204	6,953
Dianwély	Commune	5,948	8,649
Djaptodji	Commune	26,554	36,232
Douentza	Urban commune	13,138	24,005
Gandamia	Commune	3,103	5,961
Haïré	Commune	17,950	30,008
Hombori	Commune	13,310	23,103
Kéréna	Commune	1,849	3,903
Korarou	Commune	1,844	3,449
Koubewel Koundia	Commune	10,230	13,180
Mondoro	Commune	20,968	42,194
Pétaka	Commune	4,635	5,553
Tédjé (Tédié)	Commune	6,733	8,792
Gao	Cercle	171,253	239,535
Anchawadi	Commune	10,795	20,559
Gabero	Commune	18,771	25,621
Gao	Urban commune	52,201	86,353
Gounzoureye	Commune	19,970	27,249
N'Tillit	Commune	10,073	22,285
Sony Aliber	Commune	29,816	47,618
Tilemsi	Commune	1,674	9,850
Goundam	Cercle	130,583	151,329
Alzounoub	Commune	3,774	4,477
Bintagoungou	Commune	6,159	8,313
D'adarmalane (Adarmalane)	Commune	1,960	955
Douékiré	Commune	12,638	18,095
Doukouria	Commune	2,431	2,765
Essakane	Commune	9,130	11,358
Gargando	Commune	6,658	8,522
Goundam	Urban commune	9,030	12,586
Issa Bery	Commune	4,674	4,126
Kaneye	Commune	2,052	2,332
M'Bouna	Commune	4,749	3,831
Raz-El-Ma	Commune	3,511	4,398
Télé	Commune	5,489	5,926
Tilemsi	Commune	1,893	7,392
Tin Aicha	Commune	1,928	2,977
Tonka	Commune	37,821	53,276
Gourma-Rharous	Cercle	67,717	111,033
Bambara Maoudé	Commune	9,635	16,485
Banikane	Commune	5,482	9,449
Gossi	Commune	9,458	24,065
Hanzakoma	Commune	3,483	9,084
Haribomo	Commune	6,531	7,371
Inadiatafane	Commune	4,155	3,557
Ouinerden	Commune	3,786	6,101
Rharous (Gourma-Rharous)	Commune	15,155	26,287
Serere	Commune	5,949	8,634
Kadiolo	Cercle	130,730	243,411
Diou	Commune	2,828	3,504
Dioumaténé	Commune	5,640	7,863
Fourou	Commune	21,289	41,543
Kadiolo	Commune	31,292	52,016
Kaï	Commune	6,956	8,185
Loulouni	Commune	31,468	41,086
Misséni	Commune	12,676	47,673
Nimbougou	Commune	4,605	8,423
Zégoua	Commune	13,976	33,118
Kangaba	Cercle	76,404	100,398
Balan Bakama	Commune	4,974	6,891
Benkadi Habaladougou	Commune	6,637	9,435
Kaniogo	Commune	12,994	16,785
Karan	Urban commune	5,669	6,376
Maramandougou	Commune	10,875	14,539
Minidian (Kangaba)	Commune	13,420	18,125
Narena	Commune	8,875	12,553
Nouga	Commune	8,488	11,057
Selefougou	Commune	4,472	4,637
Kati	Cercle	513,798	956,753
Baguinéda-Camp	Commune	28,371	51,821
Bancoumana (Bankoumana)	Commune	19,138	23,577
Bossofala	Commune	15,657	16,898
Bougoula	Commune	8,194	10,781
Daban	Commune	8,621	11,159
Diago	Commune	6,010	9,412
Dialakoroba	Commune	16,700	22,835
Dialakorodji	Commune	12,938	47,486
Diédougou	Commune	8,624	10,512
Dio-Gare	Commune	8,386	12,742
Dogodouman	Commune	4,276	11,784
Dombila	Commune	10,219	13,452
Doubabougou	Commune	6,155	9,855
Faraba	Commune	9,554	12,357
Kalabancoro	Commune	35,582	161,882
Kalifabougou	Commune	11,101	11,621
Kambila	Commune	9,784	15,365
Kati	Urban commune	52,714	84,500
Kourouba	Commune	4,960	5,829
Mandé	Commune	30,577	57,349
Moribabougou	Commune	5,377	27,059
Mountougoula	Commune	10,258	16,228
N'Gabacoro	Commune	5,995	18,263
N'Gouraba	Commune	12,419	17,695
Niagadina	Commune	8,498	10,442
Nioumamakana	Commune	6,244	8,426
N'Tjiba	Commune	17,272	21,792
Ouélessébougou	Commune	36,198	50,039
Safo	Commune	7,923	14,681
Sanankoroba	Commune	22,251	37,361
Sanankoro Djitoumou	Commune	10,142	13,327
Sangarébougou	Commune	8,046	47,192
Siby	Commune	18,150	24,255
Sobra	Commune	6,856	9,804
Tiakadougou-Dialakoro	Commune	5,369	7,698
Tiélé	Commune	14,871	18,494
Yélékébougou	Commune	10,368	12,780
Kayes	Cercle	327,891	513,172
Bangassi	Commune	6,614	12,097
Colimbiné	Commune	9,741	12,497
Diamou	Commune	12,550	14,130
Djélébou	Commune	16,306	23,557
Falémé	Commune	6,541	10,158
Fégui	Urban commune	2,688	3,933
Gory Gopela	Commune	5,296	7,866
Gouméra	Urban commune	2,589	3,821
Guidimakan Kéri Kaffo	Commune	14,234	20,032
Hawa Dembaya	Commune	5,118	6,851
Karakoro	Commune	11,677	15,206
Kayes	Urban commune	67,424	126,319
Kéméné Tambo	Commune	13,266	16,955
Khouloum	Commune	8,940	18,994
Koniakary	Urban commune	7,023	8,141
Koussané	Commune	14,176	21,590
Liberté Dembaya	Commune	7,240	14,366
Logo	Commune	9,967	11,989
Maréna Diombougou	Commune	12,903	18,672
Marintoumania	Commune	5,705	8,061
Sadiola	Commune	19,447	39,409
Sahel	Commune	7,432	12,227
Samé Diomgoma	Commune	9,244	12,411
Ségala	Commune	18,767	25,803
Séro Diamanou	Commune	16,092	23,339
Somankidy	Urban commune	4,784	6,915
Sony	Commune	6,328	8,707
Tafacirga	Commune	5,799	9,126
Kéniéba	Cercle	144,971	197,050
Baye	Commune	10,955	14,649
Dabia	Commune	9,147	15,179
Dialafara	Commune	13,721	17,961
Dombia	Commune	8,986	7,582
Faléa	Commune	13,173	17,445
Faraba	Commune	6,777	7,772
Guénégoré	Commune	9,850	6,587
Kassama	Commune	17,224	19,462
Kéniéba	Commune	25,914	35,651
Kouroukoto	Commune	5,115	10,320
Sagalo	Commune	10,229	14,288
Sitakilly	Commune	13,880	30,154
Kidal	Cercle	17,866	33,466
Anefif	Commune	4,325	5,119
Essouk	Commune	1,011	2,378
Kidal	Urban commune	11,159	25,969
Kita	Cercle	303,647	432,531
Badia	Commune	5,895	7,137
Bendougouba	Commune	11,790	11,925
Benkadi Founia	Commune	6,730	9,284
Boudofo	Commune	2,932	4,477
Bougaribaya	Commune	5,916	10,085
Didenko	Commune	6,700	9,947
Djidian	Commune	12,410	16,392
Djougoun	Commune	6,917	8,432
Gadougou I	Commune	16,386	25,375
Gadougou II	Commune	4,668	9,271
Guémoukouraba	Commune	6,282	10,129
Kassaro	Commune	11,918	21,606
Kita	Urban commune	31,861	49,043
Kita Nord	Commune	5,969	8,568
Kita Ouest	Commune	11,741	16,762
Kobri	Commune	12,496	15,204
Kokofata	Commune	14,338	22,084
Kotouba	Commune	2,321	5,818
Koulou	Commune	5,441	10,532
Kourouninkoto	Urban commune	3,247	5,505
Madina	Commune	13,447	14,025
Makano	Commune	8,141	11,029
Namala Guimba	Commune	8,590	11,914
Niantanso	Commune	4,005	5,130
Saboula	Commune	7,063	6,184
Sébékoro	Commune	18,443	32,815
Séféto-Nord	Commune	8,037	11,558
Séféto-Ouest	Commune	14,690	17,457
Senko	Commune	7,813	8,281
Sirakoro	Commune	8,849	10,598
Souransan-Tomoto	Commune	5,004	8,520
Tambaga	Commune	7,125	10,482
Toukoto	Commune	6,482	6,962
Kolokani	Cercle	184,905	232,500
Didieni	Commune	25,421	33,094
Guihoyo	Commune	14,917	21,531
Kolokani	Commune	33,558	44,220
Massantola	Commune	29,101	35,363
Nonkon	Commune	14,743	18,131
Nossombougou	Commune	17,373	20,745
Ouolodo	Commune	9,328	9,962
Sagabala	Commune	15,258	17,707
Sébékoro 1 (Sebecoro)	Commune	15,053	19,045
Tioribougou	Commune	10,153	12,702
Kolondiéba	Cercle	141,861	201,462
Bougoula	Commune	3,716	6,281
Fakola	Commune	14,668	28,440
Farako	Commune	10,370	14,773
Kadiana	Commune	15,745	19,845
Kebila	Commune	24,796	33,090
Kolondieba	Commune	37,945	53,380
Kolosso	Commune	5,391	6,200
Mena	Commune	5,003	6,157
Nangalasso	Commune	8,629	11,684
N'Golodiana	Commune	5,385	6,872
Tiongui	Commune	6,573	9,193
Tousseguela	Commune	3,640	5,547
Koro	Cercle	267,578	362,587
Bamba	Commune	10,310	13,403
Barapireli	Commune	10,375	12,929
Bondo	Commune	14,959	19,592
Diankabou	Commune	8,517	11,615
Dinangourou	Commune	21,791	32,823
Dioungani	Commune	24,958	32,549
Dougoutene I	Commune	14,563	20,930
Dougoutene II	Commune	16,016	21,045
Kassa	Commune	13,206	18,901
Koporokendie Na	Commune	14,506	18,504
Koporo Pen	Commune	15,310	18,766
Koro	Commune	41,802	63,341
Madougou	Commune	22,142	28,943
Pel Maoudé	Commune	12,522	13,659
Yoro	Commune	13,020	19,109
Youdiou	Commune	13,581	16,478
Koulikoro	Cercle	153,485	210,611
Dinandougou	Commune	15,108	21,360
Doumba	Commune	6,091	7,463
Koula	Commune	20,799	23,448
Koulikoro	Urban commune	28,670	41,602
Meguetan	Commune	16,977	25,393
Nyamina	Commune	27,059	35,785
Sirakorola	Commune	26,043	35,992
Tienfala	Commune	4,036	6,988
Tougouni	Commune	8,702	12,580
Koutiala	Cercle	382,350	580,453
Diédougou	Commune	4,352	5,517
Diouradougou Kafo	Commune	8,272	9,251
Fagui	Commune	7,621	10,949
Fakolo	Commune	8,686	11,254
Gouadji Kao	Commune	7,081	10,714
Goudié Sougouna	Commune	7,937	13,428
Kafo Faboli	Commune	11,123	14,206
Kapala	Commune	5,214	8,293
Karagouana Mallé	Commune	5,712	7,359
Kolonigué	Commune	14,681	22,960
Konigué	Commune	10,453	16,117
Konina	Commune	9,616	13,856
Konséguéla	Commune	20,919	30,084
Koromo	Commune	4,418	9,367
Kouniana	Commune	2,186	4,645
Koutiala	Urban commune	76,914	141,444
Logouana	Commune	5,531	8,401
Miéna	Commune	10,823	13,034
M'Pessoba	Commune	29,254	35,331
Nafanga	Commune	6,148	8,794
Nampé	Commune	5,703	4,826
N'Golonianasso	Commune	12,995	19,802
N'Goutjina	Commune	7,817	19,575
Niantaga	Commune	3,680	6,203
N'Tossoni	Commune	5,426	6,742
Sincina	Commune	10,645	19,046
Sinkolo	Commune	7,395	12,415
Songo-Doubacoré	Commune	9,222	14,760
Songoua	Commune	5,117	6,199
Sorobasso	Commune	4,115	5,716
Tao	Commune	4,687	5,947
Yognogo	Commune	3,895	4,768
Zanfigué	Commune	10,571	15,239
Zangasso	Commune	13,463	19,496
Zanina	Commune	5,824	7,425
Zébala	Commune	14,854	17,290
Macina	Cercle	168,853	236,077
Bokywere	Commune	10,816	15,402
Folomana	Commune	6,680	8,411
Kokry	Commune	11,631	17,484
Kolongo (Kolongotomo)	Commune	22,974	34,174
Macina	Commune	23,450	36,272
Matomo	Commune	10,585	15,027
Monimpebougou	Commune	22,855	33,954
Saloba	Commune	27,850	34,892
Sana	Commune	19,329	23,342
Souleye	Commune	7,235	9,867
Tongué	Commune	5,448	7,252
Ménaka	Cercle	53,332	54,456
Alata	Commune	...	2,856
Andéramboukane	Commune	11,038	18,090
Inékar	Commune	5,177	5,421
Ménaka	Commune	14,781	22,659
Tidermène	Commune	4,181	5,430
Mopti	Cercle	263,719	368,905
Bassirou	Commune	1,369	1,718
Borondougou	Commune	7,234	8,070
Dialloubé	Commune	20,704	30,948
Fatoma	Commune	11,452	14,910
Konna	Commune	26,727	36,790
Korombana	Commune	19,213	29,741
Koubaye	Commune	5,013	6,571
Kounari	Commune	12,654	15,487
Mopti	Urban commune	80,472	120,786
Ouro Modi	Commune	3,149	3,328
Ouroubé Douddé	Commune	10,573	12,224
Sasalbé	Commune	4,802	5,996
Sio	Commune	18,382	24,130
Socoura	Commune	24,254	36,983
Soye	Commune	17,721	21,223
Nara	Cercle	166,783	241,904
Allahina	Commune	8,121	11,592
Dabo	Commune	6,641	11,624
Dilly	Commune	28,682	38,449
Dogofry	Commune	24,377	34,655
Fallou	Commune	21,477	30,035
Guénéibe	Commune	6,257	8,751
Guiré	Commune	9,574	19,875
Koronga	Commune	7,917	11,011
Nara	Commune	19,793	29,602
Niamana	Commune	21,205	28,080
Ouagadou	Commune	12,739	18,230
Niafunké	Cercle	122,988	175,442
Banikane Narhawa	Commune	16,318	21,273
Dianke	Commune	7,204	10,447
Fittouga	Commune	21,033	30,097
Koumaira	Commune	11,090	14,431
Léré	Commune	11,204	17,432
N'Gorkou	Commune	15,693	24,389
Soboundou	Commune	28,195	40,425
Soumpi	Commune	9,163	16,948
Niono	Cercle	228,264	364,871
Diabaly	Commune	20,031	34,324
Dogofry	Commune	20,880	34,013
Kala Siguida	Commune	14,492	21,343
Mariko	Commune	16,909	23,313
Nampalari	Commune	6,050	11,104
Niono	Commune	54,251	81,643
Pogo	Commune	7,487	16,325
Siribala	Commune	20,566	37,766
Sirifila-Boundy	Commune	25,885	32,915
Sokolo	Commune	14,033	25,049
Toridaga-Ko	Commune	15,733	29,766
Yeredon Saniona	Commune	11,947	17,310
Nioro	Cercle	165,708	228,926
Baniéré Koré	Commune	4,833	5,661
Diabigue	Commune	7,563	9,408
Diarra	Commune	5,655	7,137
Diaye Coura	Commune	9,826	13,717
Gavinane	Commune	10,366	15,679
Gogui	Commune	9,640	12,947
Guétéma	Commune	7,622	9,332
Kadiaba Kadiel	Commune	7,897	9,926
Koréra Koré	Commune	14,796	19,427
Niono	Urban commune	22,266	33,691
Nioro Tougouné Rangabé	Commune	10,184	13,201
Sandare	Commune	16,525	25,616
Simbi	Commune	12,603	20,093
Trougoumbé	Urban commune	9,988	12,488
Yéréré	Commune	11,883	13,487
Youri	Urban commune	4,061	7,116
San	Cercle	250,597	333,613
Baramandougou	Commune	7,011	9,149
Dah	Commune	11,859	12,935
Diakourouna	Commune	6,807	11,699
Dieli	Commune	12,436	13,984
Djeguena	Commune	4,163	4,039
Fion	Commune	5,440	6,504
Kaniegue	Commune	6,462	7,120
Karaba	Commune	6,011	8,691
Kassorola	Commune	13,349	16,342
Kava	Commune	12,478	18,356
Moribila	Commune	8,942	11,544
N'Goa	Commune	7,592	9,182
Niamana	Commune	5,007	9,583
Niasso	Commune	10,441	13,172
N'Torosso	Commune	8,372	10,199
Ouolon	Commune	9,271	13,313
San	Urban commune	46,631	66,967
Siadougou	Commune	12,143	17,744
Somo	Commune	3,760	3,744
Sourountouna	Commune	10,019	12,371
Sy	Commune	9,294	12,556
Tene	Commune	14,890	20,658
Teneni	Commune	7,096	7,000
Tourakolomba	Commune	4,993	7,877
Waki	Commune	6,130	8,884
Ségou	Cercle	501,447	696,115
Baguindadougou	Commune	8,131	10,391
Bellen	Commune	4,176	6,915
Boussin	Commune	8,496	11,504
Cinzana	Commune	28,967	36,073
Diédougou	Commune	12,984	16,529
Diganibougou	Commune	9,686	15,620
Dioro	Commune	36,880	46,621
Diouna	Commune	6,620	9,142
Dougabougou	Commune	19,478	27,951
Farako	Commune	9,985	11,771
Farakou Massa	Commune	10,376	14,710
Fatiné	Commune	20,147	25,144
Kamiandougou	Commune	11,835	15,177
Katiéna	Commune	21,157	34,112
Konodimini	Commune	13,037	15,913
Markala	Commune	36,303	45,926
Massala	Commune	5,524	7,304
N'Gara	Commune	12,414	11,706
N'Koumandougou	Commune	9,551	13,656
Pelengana	Commune	19,963	55,847
Sakoïba	Commune	12,471	18,286
Sama Foulala	Commune	6,457	7,032
Saminé	Commune	7,971	12,320
Sansanding	Commune	15,145	23,399
Sébougou	Commune	9,720	16,250
Ségou	Urban commune	105,305	133,501
Sibila	Commune	13,656	19,105
Soignébougou	Commune	2,268	3,099
Souba	Commune	14,186	20,050
Togou	Commune	8,558	11,061
Sikasso	Cercle	514,764	734,984
Benkadi	Commune	6,033	7,964
Blendio	Commune	10,330	12,255
Danderesso	Commune	26,265	36,356
Dembela	Commune	10,188	12,503
Dialakoro	Commune	3,867	5,476
Diomaténé	Commune	3,049	4,463
Dogoni	Commune	10,227	13,428
Doumanaba	Commune	10,582	13,862
Fama	Commune	7,136	10,764
Farakala	Commune	6,009	7,588
Finkolo	Commune	10,106	14,179
Finkolo Ganadougou	Commune	12,089	17,333
Gongasso	Commune	6,587	8,806
Kabarasso	Commune	6,361	8,486
Kaboïla	Commune	21,068	27,298
Kafouziéla	Commune	4,711	6,412
Kapala	Commune	8,589	10,285
Kapolondougou	Commune	11,596	14,669
Kignan	Commune	19,113	25,963
Kléla	Commune	19,267	24,870
Kofan	Commune	8,264	10,298
Kolokoba	Commune	6,019	7,703
Koumankou	Commune	5,609	8,955
Kouoro	Commune	10,782	15,099
Kourouma	Commune	10,142	14,741
Lobougoula	Commune	24,303	31,218
Miniko	Commune	2,264	3,293
Miria	Commune	7,798	9,989
Missirikoro	Commune	3,402	4,405
Natien	Commune	4,993	6,917
Niéna	Commune	29,004	37,377
Nongo-Souala	Commune	6,603	10,044
N'Tjikouna	Commune	2,468	3,834
Pimperna	Commune	6,546	9,308
Sanzana	Commune	8,053	11,299
Sikasso	Urban commune	134,774	226,618
Sokourani-Missirikoro	Commune	2,525	3,372
Tella	Commune	5,675	7,607
Tiankadi	Commune	3,418	4,708
Wateni	Commune	5,152	6,207
Zanférébougou	Commune	3,948	4,653
Zangaradougou	Commune	3,945	7,261
Zaniéna	Commune	5,904	7,118
Ténenkou	Cercle	127,237	162,924
Diafarabé	Commune	12,874	14,907
Diaka	Commune	17,132	19,480
Diondiori	Commune	16,645	20,492
Karéri	Commune	18,392	27,803
Ouro Ardo	Commune	10,317	10,341
Ouro Guiré	Commune	6,652	8,142
Sougoulbé	Commune	5,870	9,255
Ténenkou	Urban commune	7,675	11,274
Togoré-Coumbé	Commune	21,613	27,575
Togoro Kotia	Commune	10,067	13,655
Tessalit	Cercle	13,968	15,955
Adjelhoc (Aguel'hoc, Aguelhok)	Commune	5,201	7,903
Tessalit	Commune	5,072	5,583
Timtaghène	Commune	1,422	2,469
Tin-Essako	Cercle	2,923	8,022
Intadjedite	Commune	...	5,427
Tin-Essako	Commune	2,554	2,595
Tombouctou [Timbuktu]	Cercle	71,112	127,328
Alafia	Commune	7,500	12,912
Ber	Commune	7,871	18,967
Bourem-Inaly	Commune	8,350	11,604
Lafia	Commune	7,514	7,754
Salam	Commune	7,261	21,462
Timbuktu	Urban commune	29,732	54,629
Tominian	Cercle	166,756	221,129
Benena	Commune	14,288	17,932
Diora	Commune	12,363	16,005
Fangasso	Commune	19,301	23,815
Koula	Commune	15,250	18,089
Lanfiala	Commune	5,755	9,441
Mafoune	Commune	17,090	23,283
Mandiakuy	Commune	15,763	21,087
Ouan	Commune	7,637	9,108
Sanekuy	Commune	12,144	15,734
Timissa	Commune	17,912	27,752
Tominian	Commune	19,042	25,053
Yasso	Commune	10,211	13,830
Yanfolila	Cercle	163,798	212,717
Baya	Commune	14,462	24,464
Bolo-Fouta	Commune	3,561	4,428
Djallon-Foula	Commune	10,174	11,197
Djiguiya de Koloni	Commune	4,557	6,864
Gouanan	Commune	18,763	25,119
Gouandiaka	Commune	19,190	26,247
Koussan	Commune	7,534	10,191
Sankarani	Commune	8,048	7,563
Séré Moussa Ani Samou	Commune	16,158	18,784
Tagandougou	Commune	14,101	15,111
Wassoulou-Ballé	Commune	37,498	51,473
Yallankoro-Soloba	Commune	9,752	11,276
Yélimané	Cercle	121,463	176,517
Diafounou Diongaga	Commune	7,077	9,678
Diafounou Gory	Commune	14,161	20,250
Fanga	Commune	5,370	7,933
Gory	Commune	8,644	12,601
Guidimé	Commune	27,121	39,823
Kirané Kaniaga	Commune	23,729	34,897
Konsiga	Commune	3,024	4,928
Kremis	Commune	6,735	11,044
Marékhaffo	Commune	3,399	5,324
Soumpou	Commune	3,359	4,853
Toya	Urban commune	8,908	12,644
Tringa	Commune	9,936	12,542
Yorosso	Cercle	141,021	211,606
Boura	Commune	14,846	22,215
Karangana	Commune	12,875	17,018
Kiffosso	Commune	15,502	19,438
Koumbia	Commune	15,274	25,435
Koury	Commune	33,605	54,290
Mahou	Commune	11,925	16,247
Ménamba 1	Commune	6,839	10,521
Ourikéla	Commune	16,356	23,834
Yorosso	Commune	13,799	22,608
Youwarou	Cercle	85,426	108,523
Bembéré Tama	Commune	5,750	8,239
Deboye	Commune	16,229	23,152
Dirma	Commune	6,753	8,118
Dongo	Commune	11,255	11,476
Farimaké	Commune	6,898	11,916
N'Dodjiga	Commune	17,849	22,309
Youwarou	Commune	17,229	23,313
Mali	Republic	9,810,912	14,528,662

== See also ==
- List of cities in Mali
- List of Arrondissements of Mali
