= Kayes Region =

Region of Mali

- Region
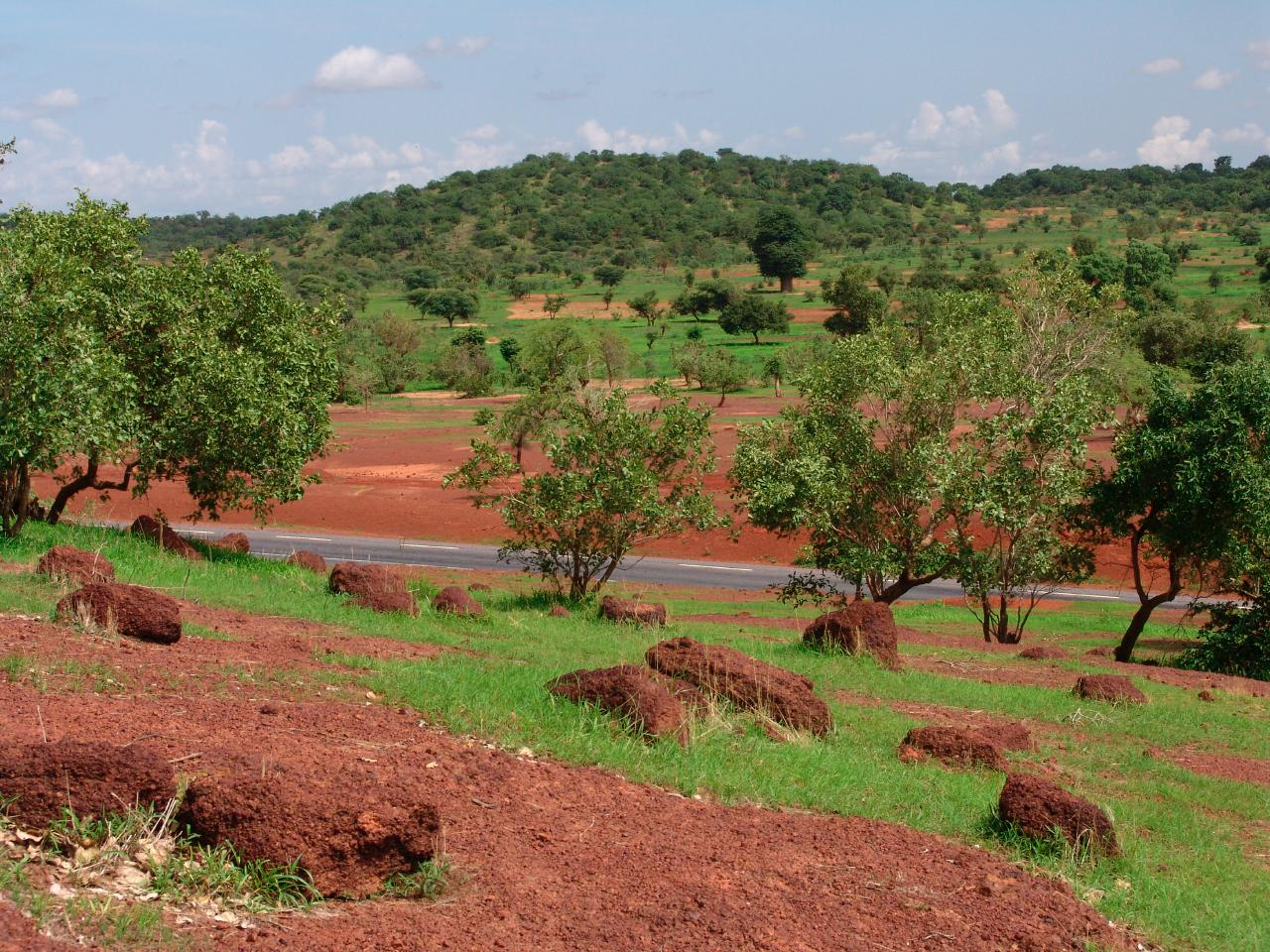
- Sahel forest

- Location within Mali
- Interactive map of Kayes Region
- Country: Mali
- Capital: Kayes

Government
  - Governor: Moussa Soumaré

Area
  - Total: 63,210 km^{2} (24,410 sq mi)

Population (2023)
  - Total: 1,815,258
  - Density: 28.72/km^{2} (74.38/sq mi)
- Time zone: UTC±0 (UTC)
- HDI (2017): 0.387 low

Kayes Region (Bambara: ߞߊߦߌ ߘߌߣߋߖߊ tr. Kayi Dineja, Arabic: منطقة كايس, romanized: minṭaqa Kāyas) is one of 19 regions of Mali. Kayes Region is the first administrative area of Mali and covers an area of 63,210 square kilometres or 24,410 square miles. Its capital is the town of Kayes. The province was historically part of the Ghana Empire and the Mali Empire.

== Geography ==
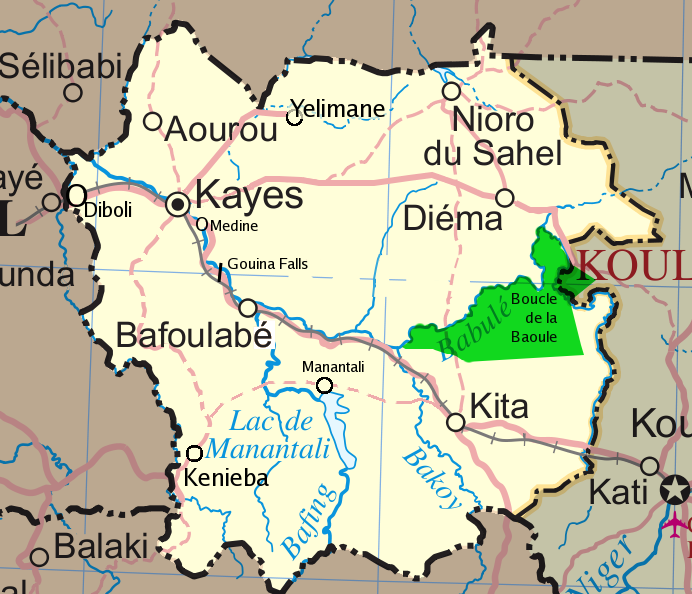
Kayes Region (old borders). Unpaved roads are shown by dashed lines. The borders of the Boucle du Baoulé National Park are approximate.

The region of Kayes is bordered to the north by Mauritania, to the west by Senegal, to the south by Guinea and to the east by the regions of Kita and Nioro.

Several rivers cross the region: the Baoulé, the Bafing, and the Bakoy which join at the town of Bafoulabé to form the Sénégal River. The Falls of Félou (15 km from Kayes), the Falls of Gouina (60 km to the south-east of Kayes on the Sénégal River), Talari Gorges, Lake Magui and Lake Doro are located in the region.

At the Guinean border, the climate is rather wet but becomes Sudanian and later Sahelian to the north.

The largest cities in the region are Kayes, Kita, Bafoulabé, Nioro du Sahel, Diéma, Yélimané, Diangounté, Sadiola, and Kéniéba The Bafing National Park and the Boucle du Baoulé National Park are located in the region.

== Cercles ==
For administrative purposes the Region of Kayes is divided into seven cercles:

Cercle name	Area (km^{2})	Population Census 1998	Population Census 2009
Kayes	22,190	327,891	513,362
Bafoulabé	20,220	168,731	233,926
Kéniéba	12,883	144,971	194,153
Kita	35,250	303,647	434,379
Diéma	12,440	141,905	212,062
Nioro	11,060	165,708	230,488
Yélimané	5,700	121,463	178,442

== History ==
The region of Kayes is the cradle of the Kingdom of Khasso founded at the beginning of the 19th century.

In 1855, Louis Faidherbe, Governor of Senegal, built a fort at Medina which would be besieged by El Hadj Omar Tall, in an 1857 war against the sovereign of Khasso. In 1892, the town of Kayes became the capital of French Sudan.

The construction of the railway line of Dakar-Niger, inaugurated in 1904, made of Kayes a city-crossroads. Essential at the time, the railroad had an important place in the lives of the inhabitants, as described in Ousmane Sembène's novel God's Bits of Wood.

== Demographics ==
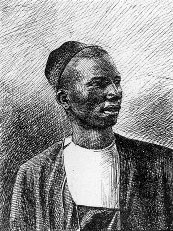
Illustration of a Khassonké man (1890)

The Kayes Region is the third most populated region in Mali, with a population of 1,840,329 in 2022. With a total fertility rate at 6.3 births per woman, Kayes has a slightly higher TFR than the Malian national average of 6.1 births per woman.

=== Ethnicity and language ===
Ethnicity in Kayes (2022)
1. Soninke (27.5%)
2. Malinké (25.3%)
3. Fula (16.5%)
4. Bambara (14.8%)
5. Khassonké (9.78%)
6. Arab (1.44%)
7. Senufo (1.41%)
8. Other (3.21%)

The Kayes Region is ethnically diverse, with Mandé peoples accounting for most of the population. The Soninke and Malinké represent the two largest ethnic groups in the region. Other significant groups in the region include the Fula and the Bambara. Kayes also has the highest concentration of Khassonké in Mali, with roughly one in ten residents belonging to that heritage. Smaller minorities in Kayes include the Arabs (Maure) and Senufo (mostly Minyanka).

Mother tongues in Kayes region (2022 census)
1. Maraka / Soninké (27.16%)
2. Malinke (24.36%)
3. Bambara (19.23%)
4. Fula (14.82%)
5. Kassonké (9.95%)
6. Maure (1.23%)
7. Other Malian (3.00%)
8. Other African (0.07%)
9. Other foreign (0.18%)

=== Religion ===
The 2022 census found that 98.75% of the population in Kayes was Muslim, 0.70% was Christian, 0.03% identified with traditional faiths, 0.42% had no religion, and 0.10% practised other religions. Islam is the dominant religion among all of Kayes' main ethnic groups, with the Soninke, Malinké, Fula, Khassonké, and Arab peoples being almost entirely Muslim.

== See also ==
- Regions of Mali
- Cercles of Mali
