= Gouina Falls =

Waterfall in Mali

Coordinates: 14°0′54″N 11°6′09″W

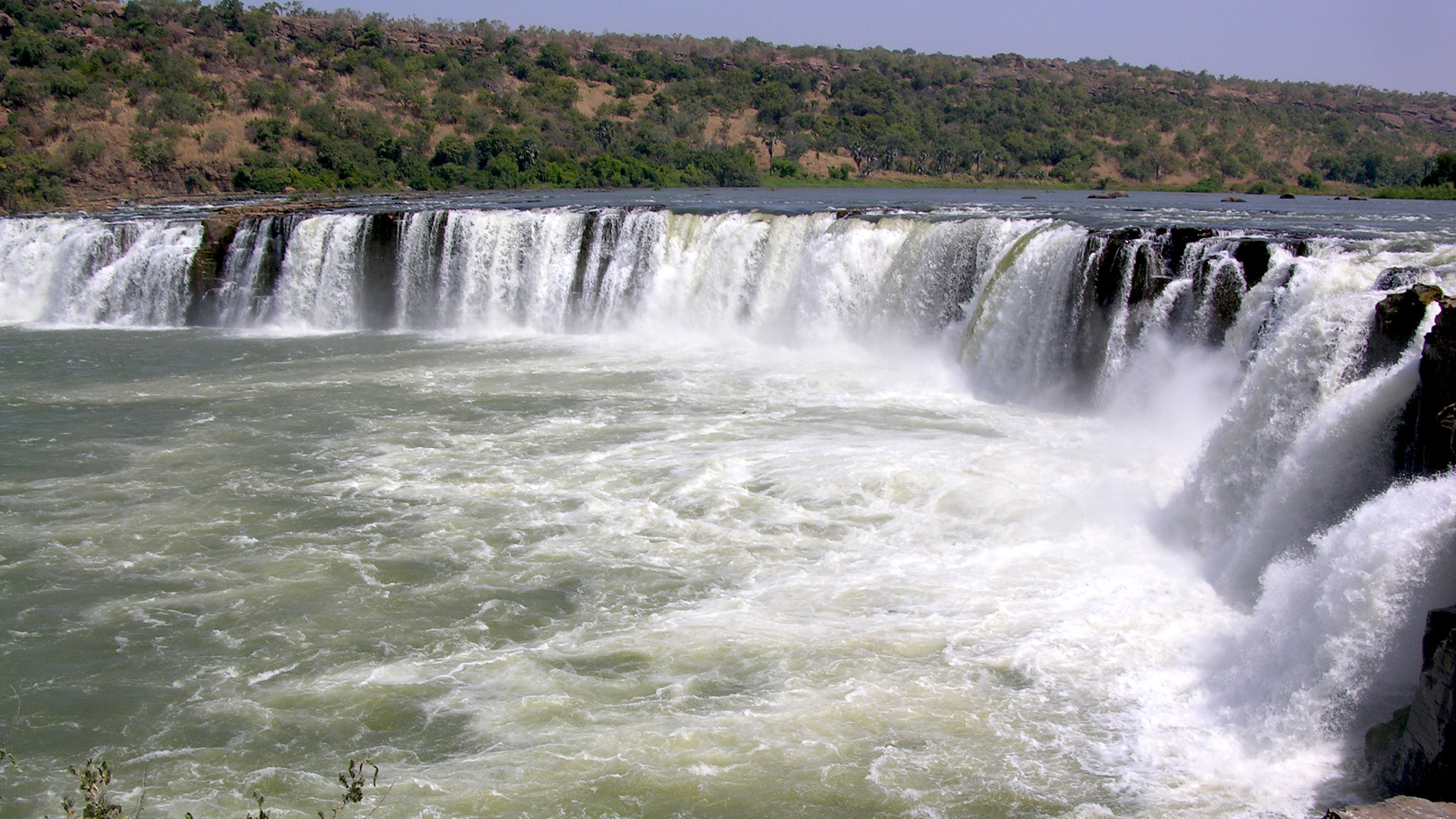
Chutes de Gouina

The Gouina Falls or Chutes de Gouina are on the Sénégal River in Mali between the towns of Bafoulabé (upstream) and Diamou (downstream) in the Kayes Region, where the river runs north from the Talari Gorges. They have been called the "Niagara falls of Mali". The river is about 500 m wide at this point, and drops 16 m over the falls. The volume of water is 12-13 m^{3} per second in the dry season, and up to 2430 m^{3} per second in the rainy season.

The government of Mali and Senegal River Basin Development Authority has investigated the possibility of developing the electric power potential of the Senegal River. Downstream on the Félou Falls, a new Félou Hydroelectric Plant was completed in 2014. On Gouina Falls, construction of the 140 MW Gouina Hydroelectric Plant began in December 2013. It was inaugurated by the Malian Prime Minister Abdoulaye Maïga in December 2022, at a total cost of 283 billion FCFA, (424 million euros).

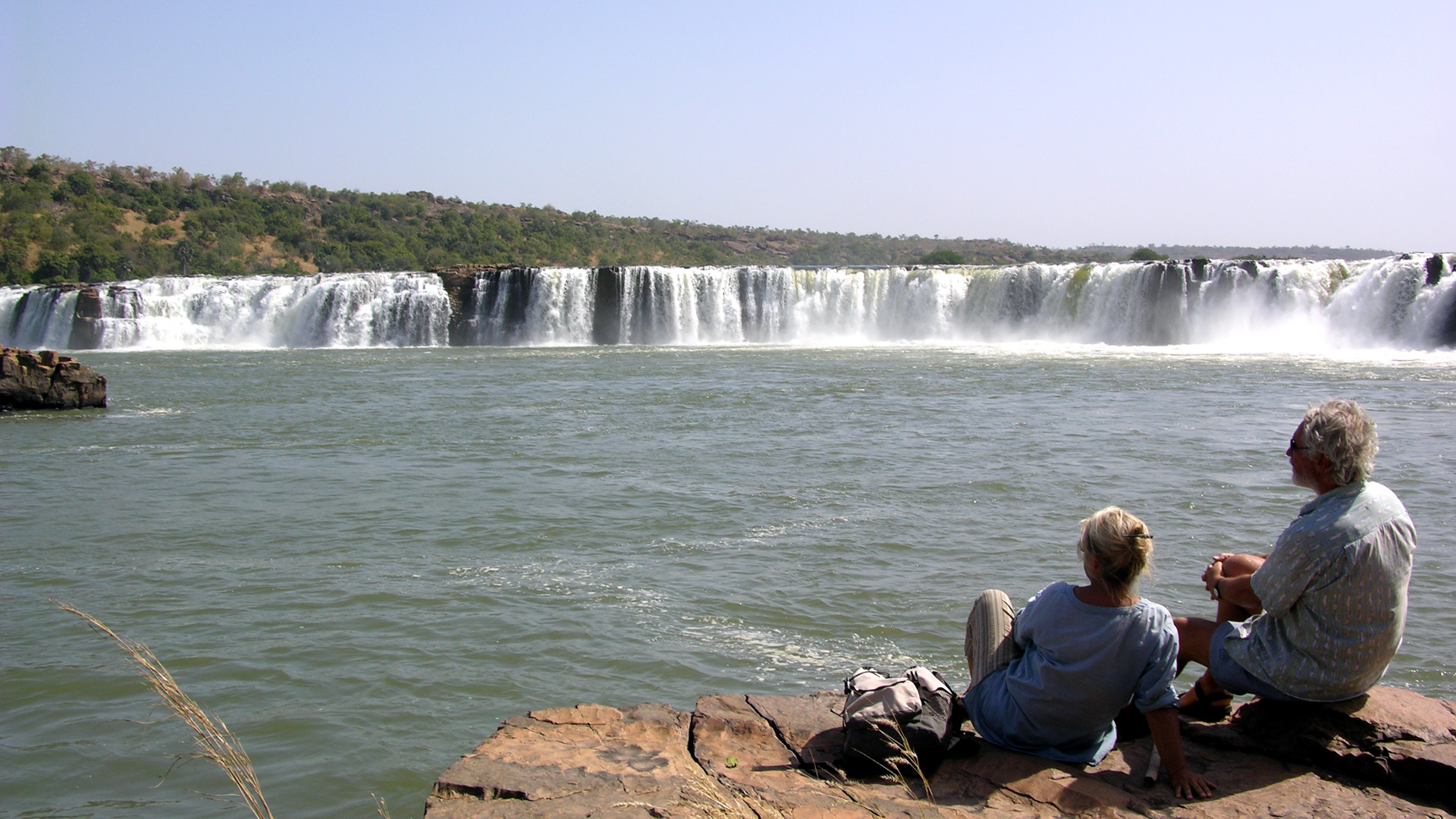
Chutes de Gouina

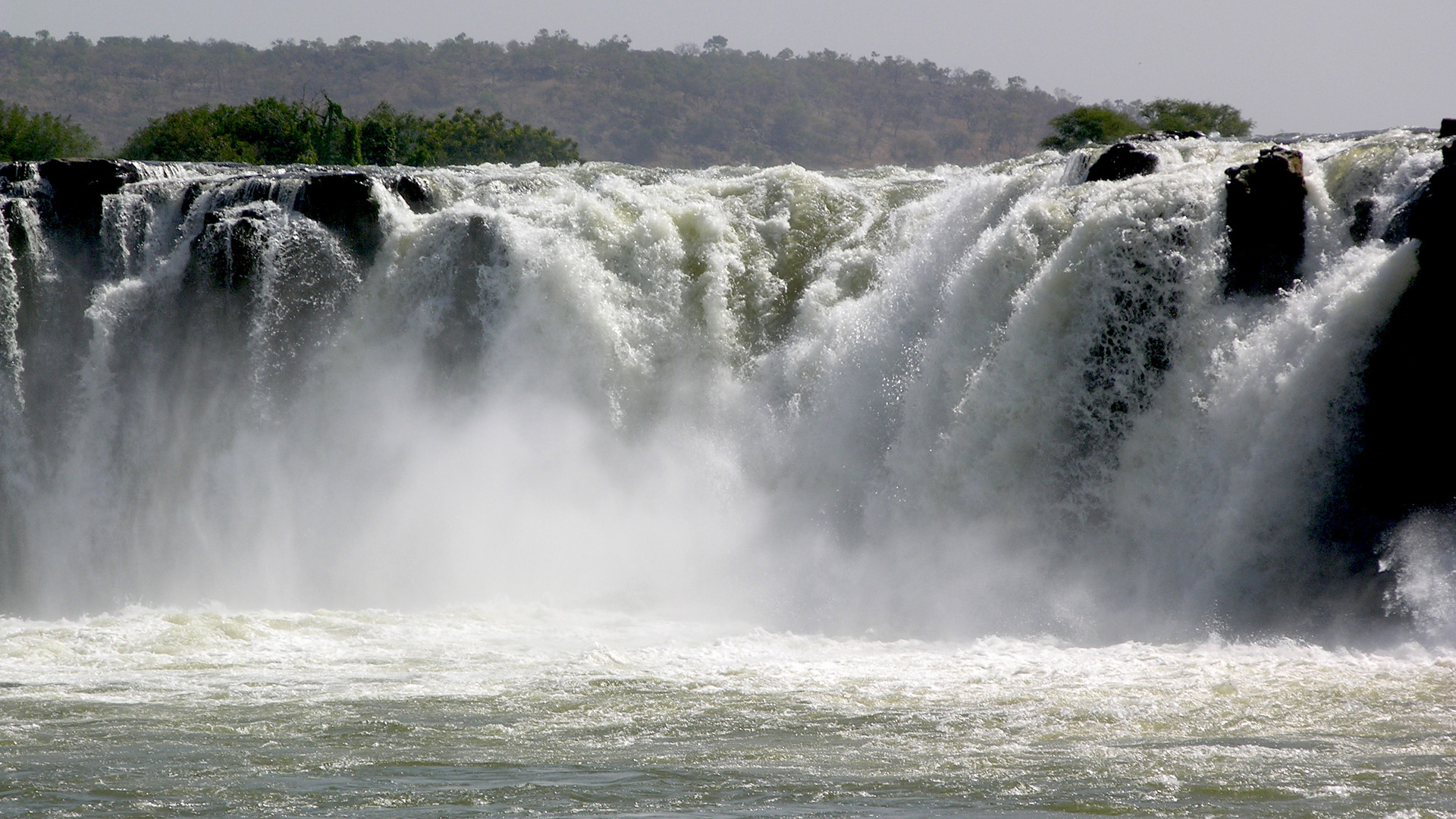
Chutes de Gouina

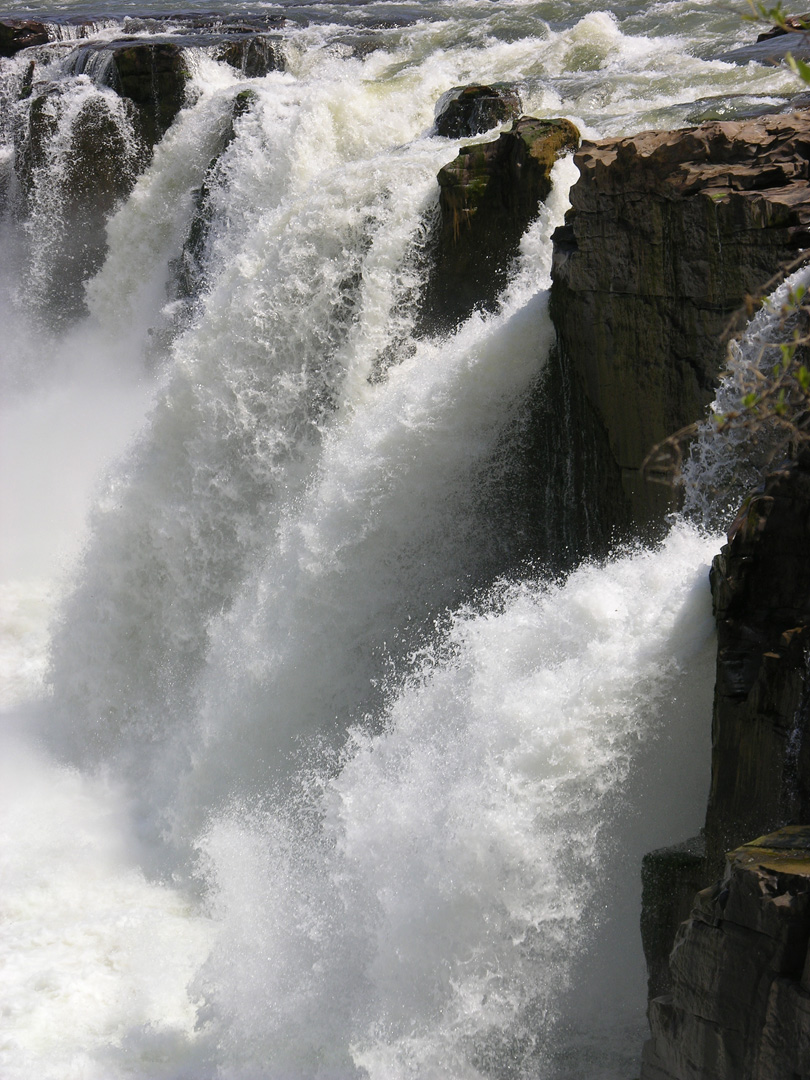
Chutes de Gouina

== See also ==
- List of waterfalls
- Horseshoe Falls
