= Mboubène =

Town in Senegal

Mboubène is a town in the lower delta of the Senegal River, near the mouth of the Marigot de Djeuss. The town is located on the main highway to the Maka-Diama Dam at a distance of 10 kilometers (6.2 mi) from the coastal city of Saint-Louis, Senegal. On French and Dutch maps, the name of the town has been spelled variously, including "MBoulene" and "Emboulan." It was called "Biffeche-Ville" during the period of the 1960s through the 1980s when it was inhabited by resettled members of the Sèrèer ethnic group. (The Sèrèers moved away to the nearby town of Savoigne.)

Today, Mboubène consists of two parts: Al Madinatoul Islamiah Mboubène Peulh inhabited by Fula people, and Mboubène Naar primarily inhabited by Moors. There is a Koranic school and general store at the former, and a royal residence at the latter.

The chief economic activities are animal husbandry and gardening. Nearby agricultural fields suffer from yearly flooding and salinity.

Mboubène-Peulh is governed by an appointed Chef de Village.
