= Chariot of the Gods =

Chariot of the Gods may refer to:

- Theon Ochema, ancient Greek for 'chariot of the gods', a volcano in West Africa
- Chariot of the Gods (album), a 2022 studio album by Hoodoo Gurus

== See also ==
- Chariots of the Gods (disambiguation)
