= Gouina Hydroelectric Plant =

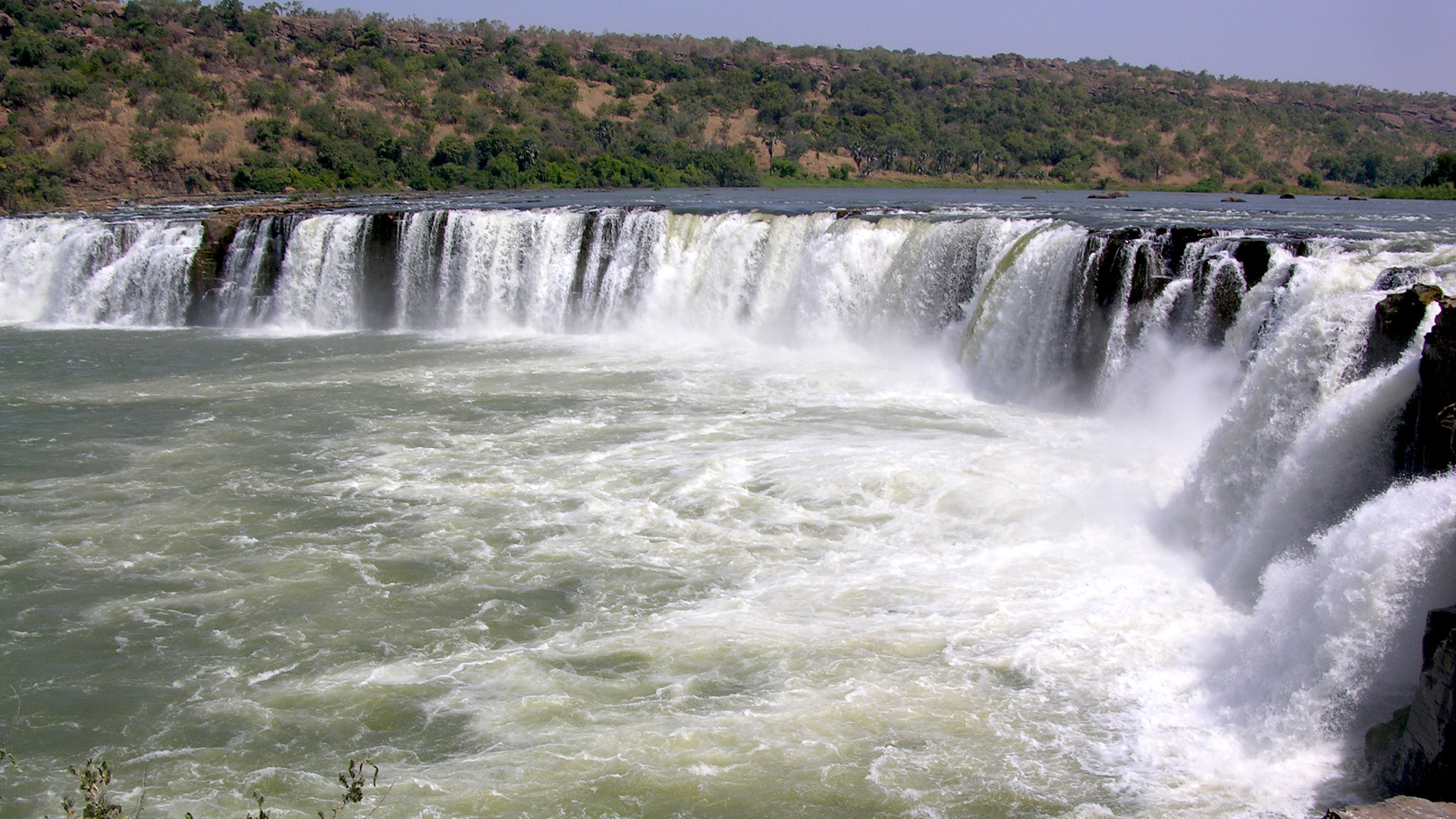
- The power plant uses the natural drop of the Gouina Falls.
- Official name: Centrale hydroélectrique de Gouina
- Country: Mali
- Location: Diamou, Kayes Region
- Coordinates: 14°00′41.40″N 11°5′59.8″W
- Status: Under construction
- Construction began: December 2013
- Commission date: 2022
- Construction cost: 283 billion FCFA

Power generation
- Units under const.: 3 x 46.6 megawatts (62,500 hp) Kaplan-type
- Nameplate capacity: 140 MW (190,000 hp)
- Annual net output: 565 gigawatt-hours (2,030 TJ) (estimate)

The Gouina Hydroelectric Plant (French: Centrale hydroélectrique de Gouina) is a run-of-the-river-type hydroelectric installation on Gouina Falls along the Senegal River in Mali. It is located about 18 km (11 mi) southeast of Diamou in the Kayes Region. It is the fourth project of the Senegal River Basin Development Authority and its ground-breaking ceremony on 17 December 2013 was attended by the heads of state of each member country. Mauritanian President Mohamed Ould Abdel Aziz laid the foundation stone. Preliminary construction had been suspended due to the 2012 Malian coup d'état and subsequent Northern Mali conflict.

The plant was inaugurated by the Malian Prime Minister Abdoulaye Maïga in December 2022. It cost US$329 million and the 280 km (170 mi) of transmission lines cost US$65 million. The project received 85 percent of its funding from the Exim Bank of China along with US$1 million from the EU-Africa Infrastructure Trust Fund and US$1.4 million from the International Development Association and European Investment Bank.

It has an installed capacity of 140 megawatts (190,000 hp) and will use the outflows of the Manantali Dam upstream to regulation water flow into the plant. A 1,230 m (4,040 ft) long weir just above the water fall directs water into a channel which will feed the power house just downstream of the falls. The power house contains three 46.6 MW Kaplan turbine-generators. The difference in elevation the water fall and weir provides a hydraulic head (water drop) of 22.5 m (74 ft).

== See also ==
- Manantali Dam – upstream
- Félou Hydroelectric Plant – downstream
- Diama Dam – downstream
