= Félou Falls =

Waterfall in Mali

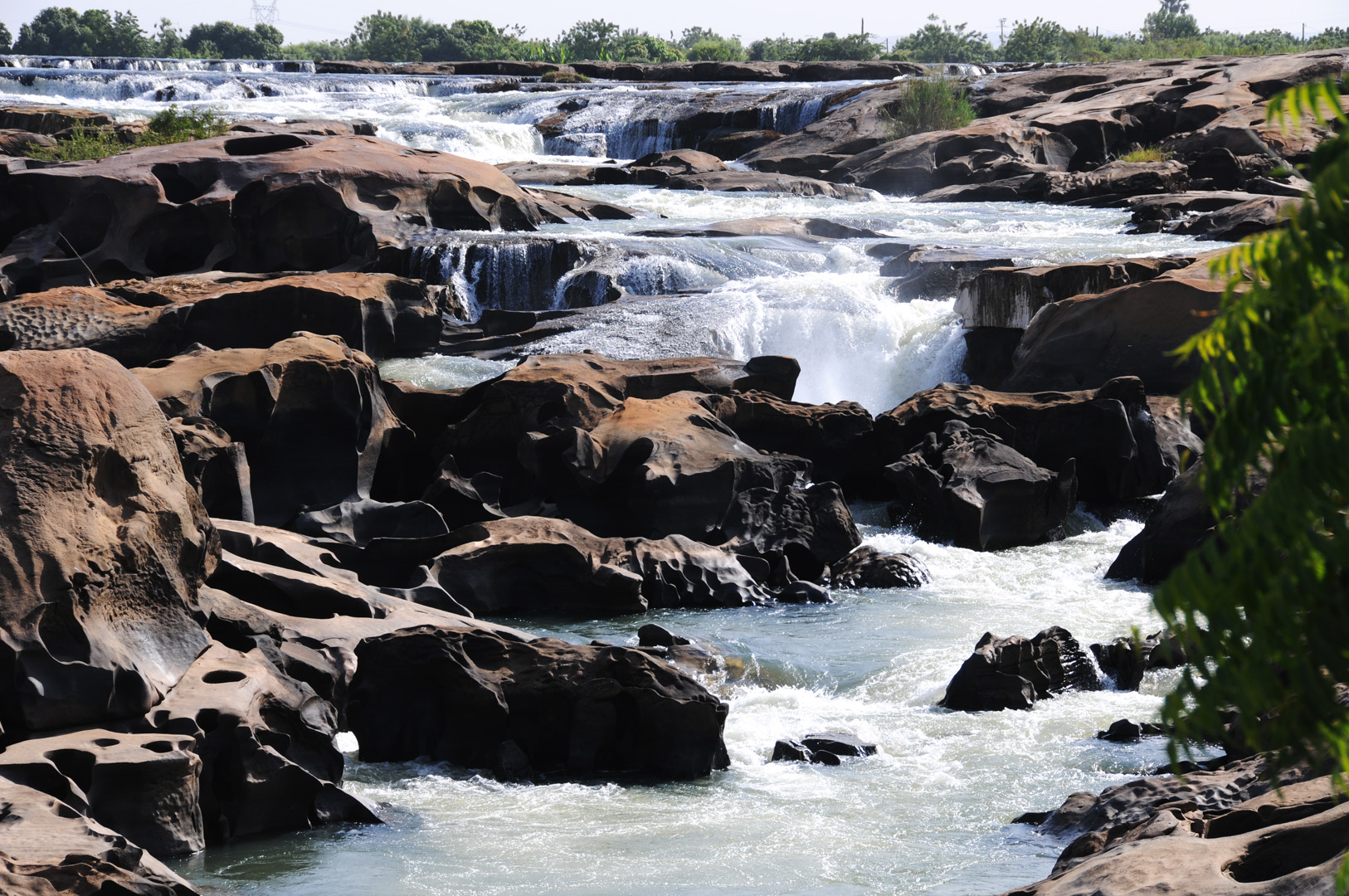

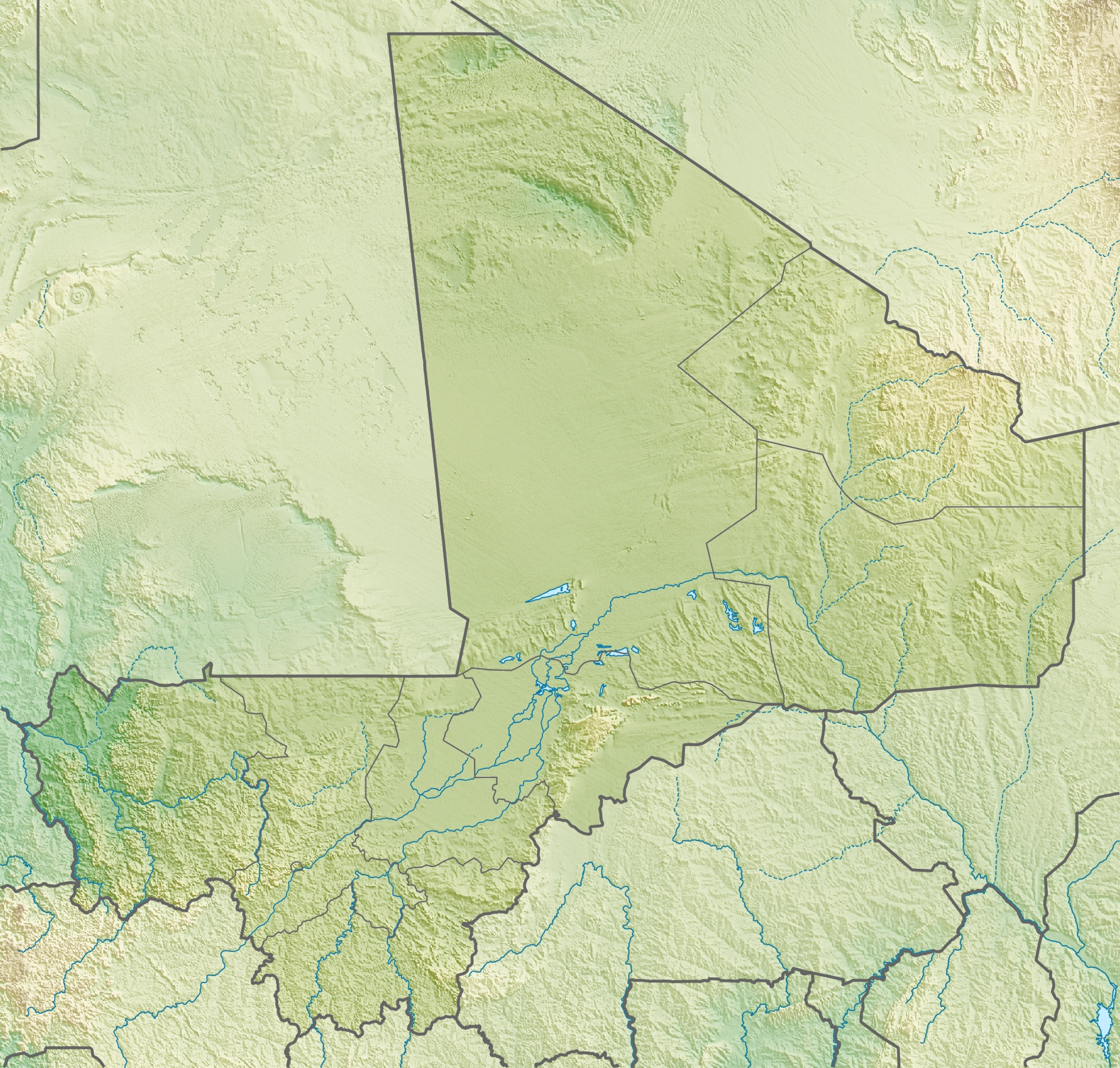
- Location within Mali
- Location: Kayes Region, Mali
- Coordinates: 14°21′13″N 11°20′43″W
- Total height: 13 metres (43 ft)
- Watercourse: Sénégal River

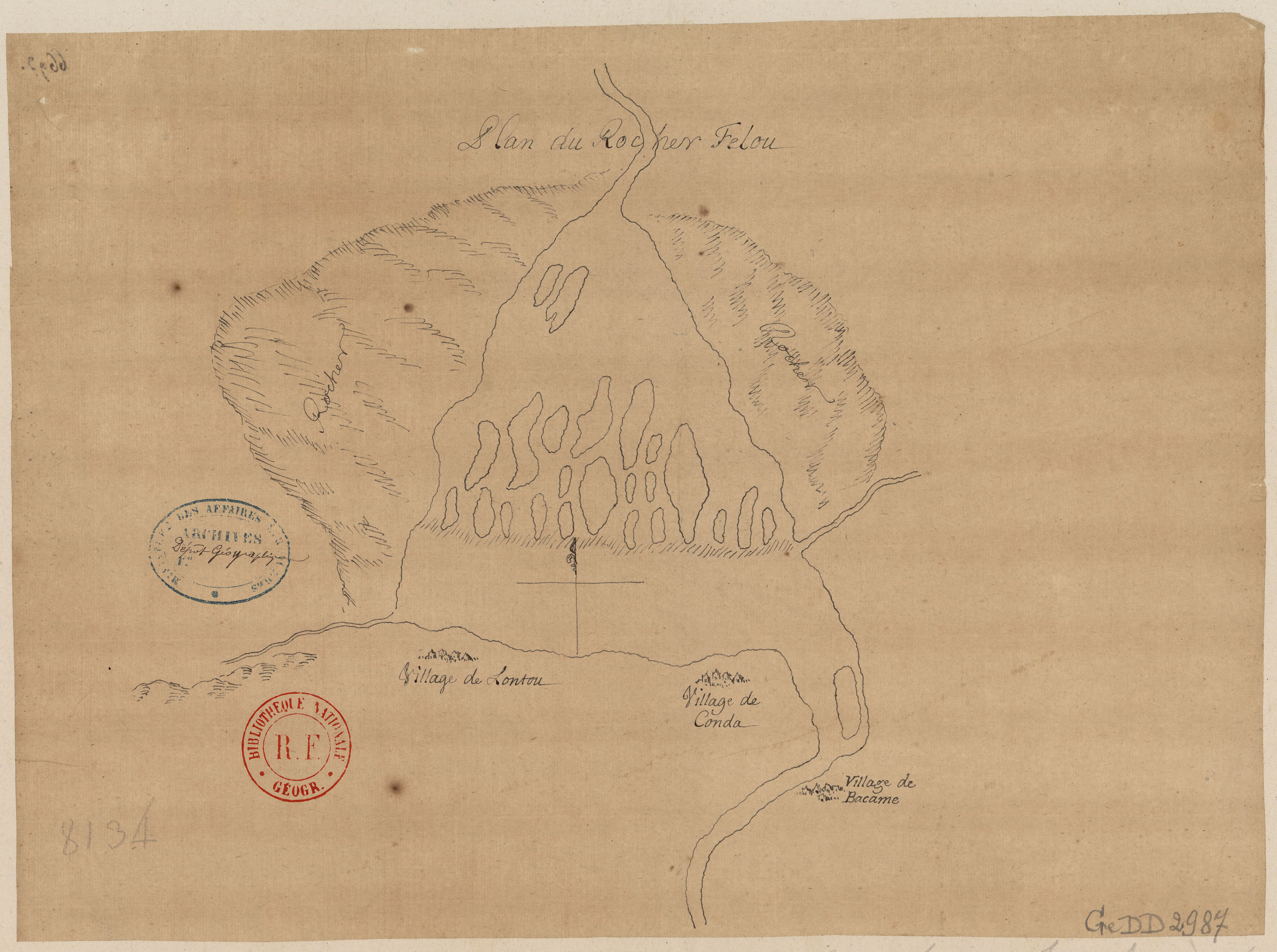
Historic plan of the Félou Falls, 1749

The Félou Falls (French: Chutes du Félou) are located on the Sénégal River 15 kilometres (9.3 mi) upstream of Kayes in western Mali. The river tumbles 13 metres (43 ft) down an irregular series of rocky steps. The waterfalls mark the furthest point from the mouth of the river that can be reached by boat. In 2009 work started on the construction of the Félou Hydroelectric Plant, a 62.3 megawatts (83,500 hp) run-of-the-river hydroelectric plant at the falls replacing a small 600 kW plant dating from the 1920s.

== Historical significance ==
The falls were historically important as they were the furthest point up the Sénégal River from Saint Louis that could be reached by boat. Because of the seasonal variation in the water level, navigation up to the falls was only possible for a few months after the rainy season. French forces made use of the river in their conquest of the Sudan in the 19th century. In 1855 Louis Faidherbe, the French governor of Sénégal, constructed a fort at the village of Médine, 3 km downstream of the falls, to strengthen French control of the Sénégal River and to act a base in the expansion into the interior.

At the present time, only very limited use is made of the river for the transport of goods and passengers. Several studies have looked at the feasibility of creating a navigable channel 55 metres (180 ft) in width between the small town of Ambidédi in Mali and Saint-Louis in Senegal, a distance of 905 kilometres (562 mi). It would give landlocked Mali a direct route to the Atlantic Ocean.

== Félou and the Sénégal River ==
The Sénégal River is formed by the confluence of the Bakoye and Bafing rivers 82 km upstream of the Félou Falls near the town of Bafoulabé. Both the Bakoye and the Bafing rivers have their headwaters in the Fouta Djallon highlands in Guinea which receive heavy rainfall between June and October during the West African Monsoon. Over the period 1903-1980, of the water arriving at Félou each year, 13 km^{3} came from the Bafing, 4.6 km^{3} from the Bakoye and 2.6 km^{3} from the basin downstream of Bafoulabé. The amount of water in the river during this period was highly seasonal with the highest flow rate in September and almost no flow between January and June. There were also large year-to-year variations in the flow.

In 1987, the Manantali Dam was completed on the Bafing, 90 km upstream of Bafoulabé and 200 km upstream of Félou. The dam retains 11.3 km^{3} of water which is used to generate electricity during the dry season. As a result, the intensity of the maximum flood downstream of the dam has been reduced but during the dry season a flow of between 150 m^{3}/s and 200 m^{3}/s is maintained.

== Hydroelectric plant ==
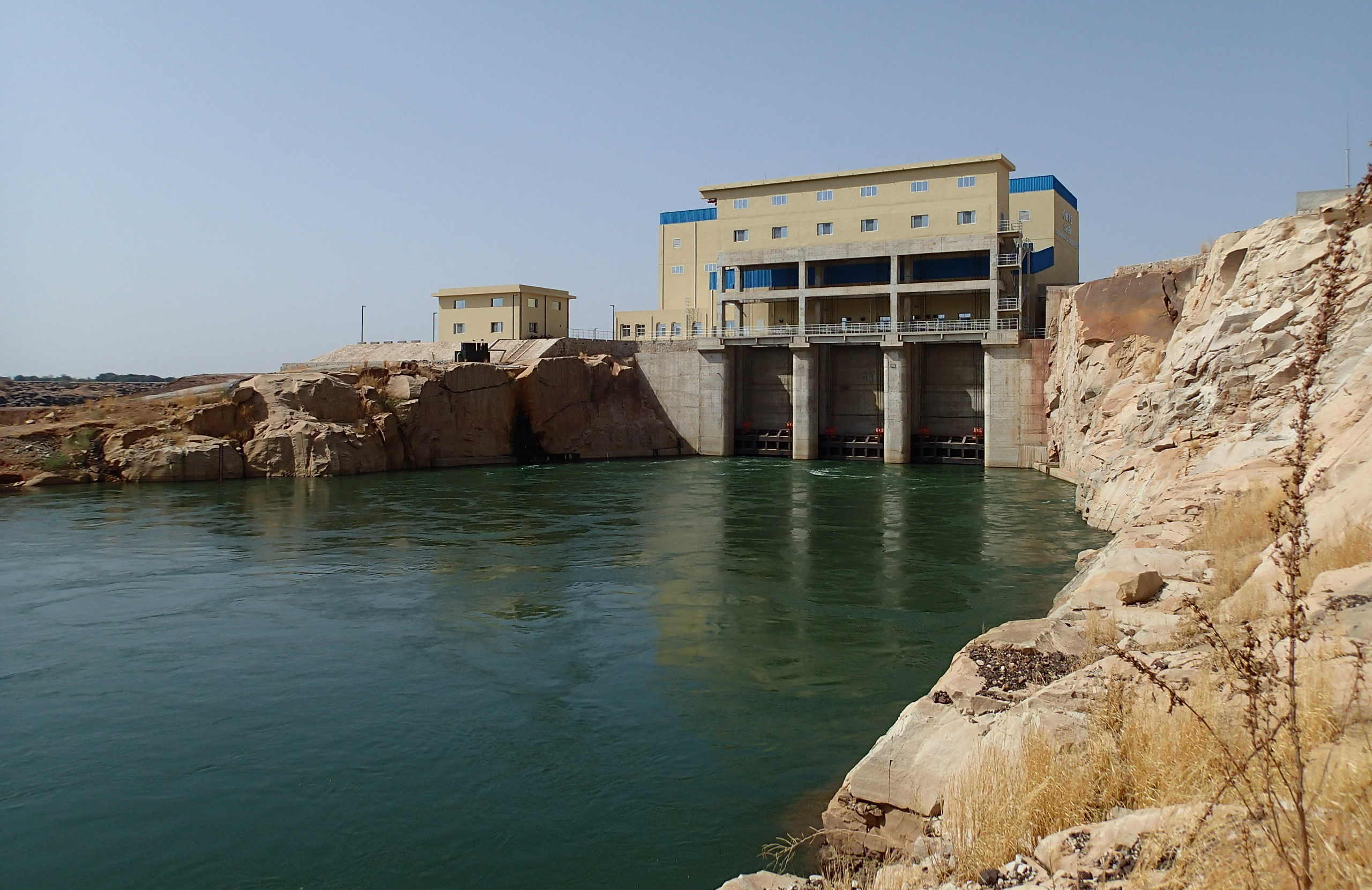
View on the hydroelectric plant of Félou in 2014

In the 1920s the French colonial government constructed a weir and a small run-of-the-river hydroelectric plant at the Félou falls which was updated in 1992. The plant used 5 cubic metres per second (180 cu ft/s) of water (about one percent of the river) to drive a 600 kilowatts (800 hp) generator. In 2009 work started on the construction of the Félou Hydroelectric Plant, a 62.3 megawatts (83,500 hp) run-of-the-river hydroelectric plant at the falls replacing the small plant dating from the 1920s.

== See also ==
- List of waterfalls
