= Talari Gorges =

Series of gorges on the Sénégal River in Mali

Coordinates: 13°47′0″N 10°58′0″W

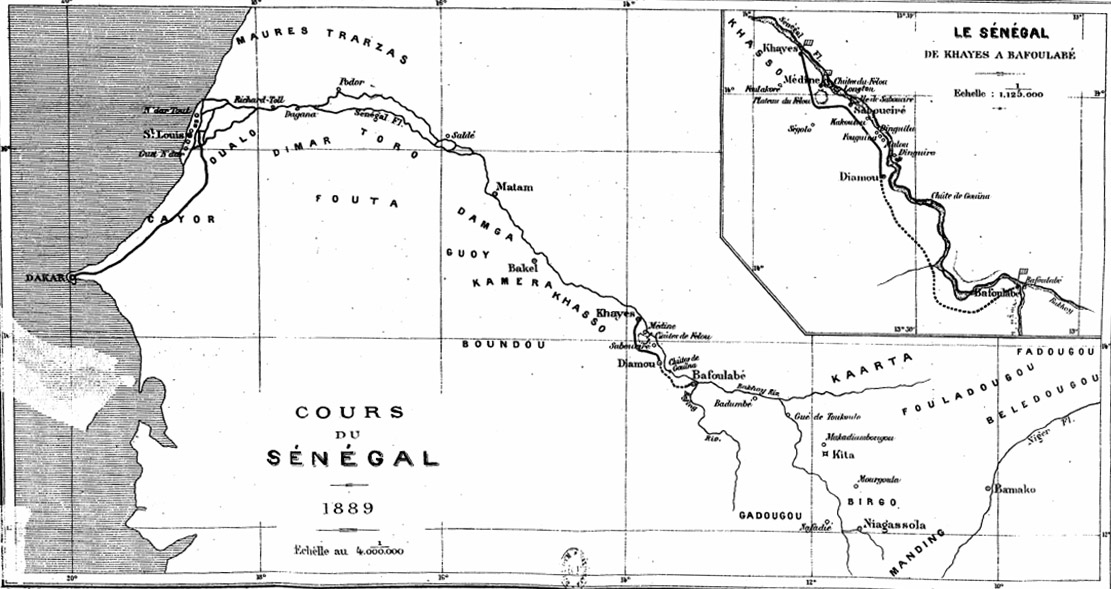
Senegal river. Talari gorges are just west of Bafoulabé, shown in inset, upstream from the Chutes de Gouina

The Talari Gorges (Gorges de Talary) are a series of gorges on the Sénégal River in Mali, between the towns of Bafoulabé (upstream) and Galougo (downstream) in the Kayes Region, at an altitude of about 75 m (246 ft) above sea level. They are celebrated for their grandiose beauty and made from approximately 600 million-year-old red sandstone about 100 m (330 ft) wide and up to 30 m (98 ft) deep. Downstream to the north are the Gouina Falls.
