= Diama Dam =

Dam on the border of Senegal and Mauritania

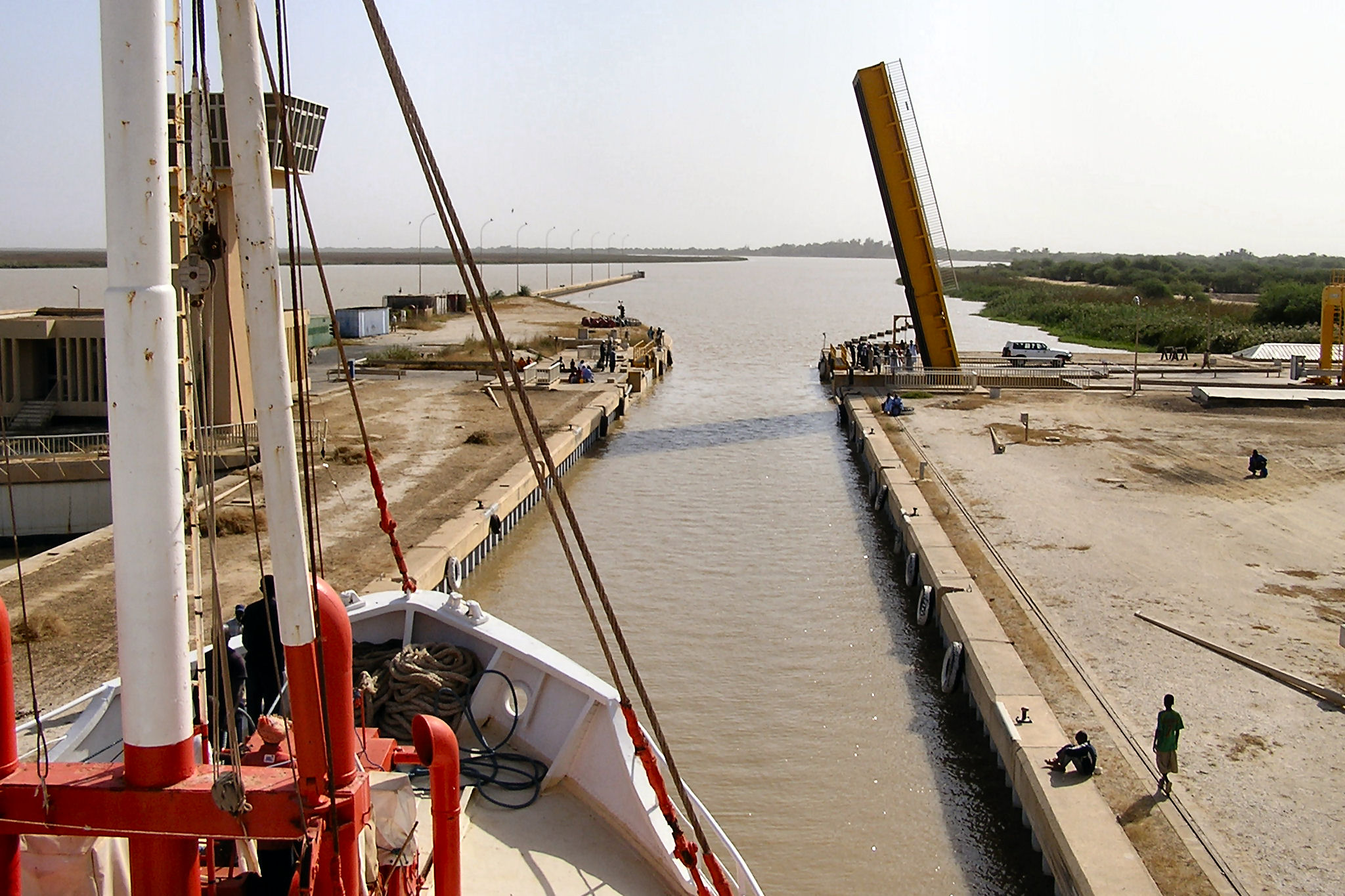
- Ship lock on the dam

- Location within Senegal
- Official name: Barrage de Diama
- Country: Senegal/Mauritania
- Location: Diama-Maka
- Coordinates: 16°13′0.20″N 16°24′53.63″W
- Purpose: Navigation, water quality, irrigation
- Status: Operational
- Construction began: 1981
- Opening date: 1986; 40 years ago
- Construction cost: US$149.5 million

Dam and spillways
- Type of dam: Gravity
- Impounds: Senegal River
- Height: 18 m (59 ft)
- Length: 610 m (2,000 ft)
- Spillway capacity: 6,500 m^{3}/s (230,000 cu ft/s)

Reservoir
- Total capacity: 250,000,000 m^{3} (200,000 acre⋅ft)
- Surface area: 235 km^{2} (91 mi^{2})

The Diama Dam, sometimes referred to as the Maka–Diama Dam (French: Barrage de Maka-Diama) is a gravity dam on the Senegal River, spanning the border of Senegal and Mauritania. It is located next to the town of Diama, Senegal and about 22 km (14 mi) north of Saint-Louis, Senegal. The purpose of the dam is to prevent saltwater intrusion upstream, supply water for the irrigation of about 45,000 ha (110,000 acres) of crops and create a road crossing for the road between St. Louis and Nouakchott in Mauritania. Additionally, a ship lock built within the dam provides for navigation upstream. Plans for the dam were first drawn in 1970 when the riparian states within the Senegal River Basin Development Authority agreed to develop the Senegal River. The Diama Dam was to be constructed in conjunction with the Manantali Dam which was to be located further upstream in Mali. Construction on the Diama Dam began on 15 September 1981 and was completed on 12 August 1986. The Manantali Dam was completed in 1988. The Diama project was funded by a US$149.5 million loan from the African Development Bank. The main section of the dam with ship lock and spillway is 170 m (560 ft) long while a 440 m (1,440 ft) long embankment dam section extends north to the edge of the river. A dike further extends the dam to the north. The dam is 18 m (59 ft) tall and its spillway has a maximum discharge of 6,500 m^{3}/s (230,000 cu ft/s).

The small town of Diama is known as a border crossing to and from Mauritania, as the dam is the only land bridge between the two countries.

== See also ==
- Schistosomiasis
- Félou Hydroelectric Plant – upstream
- Gouina Hydroelectric Plant – upstream
- Manantali Dam – upstream
