= Chariots of the Gods (disambiguation) =

Chariots of the Gods? is a 1968 book by Erich von Däniken.

Chariots of the Gods may also refer to:

- Chariots of the Gods (film), a 1970 documentary film, based on the book
- Chariot of the Gods (album), a 2022 studio album by Hoodoo Gurus

== See also ==
- Chariot of the Gods (disambiguation)
