= Félou Hydroelectric Plant =

Félou Weir
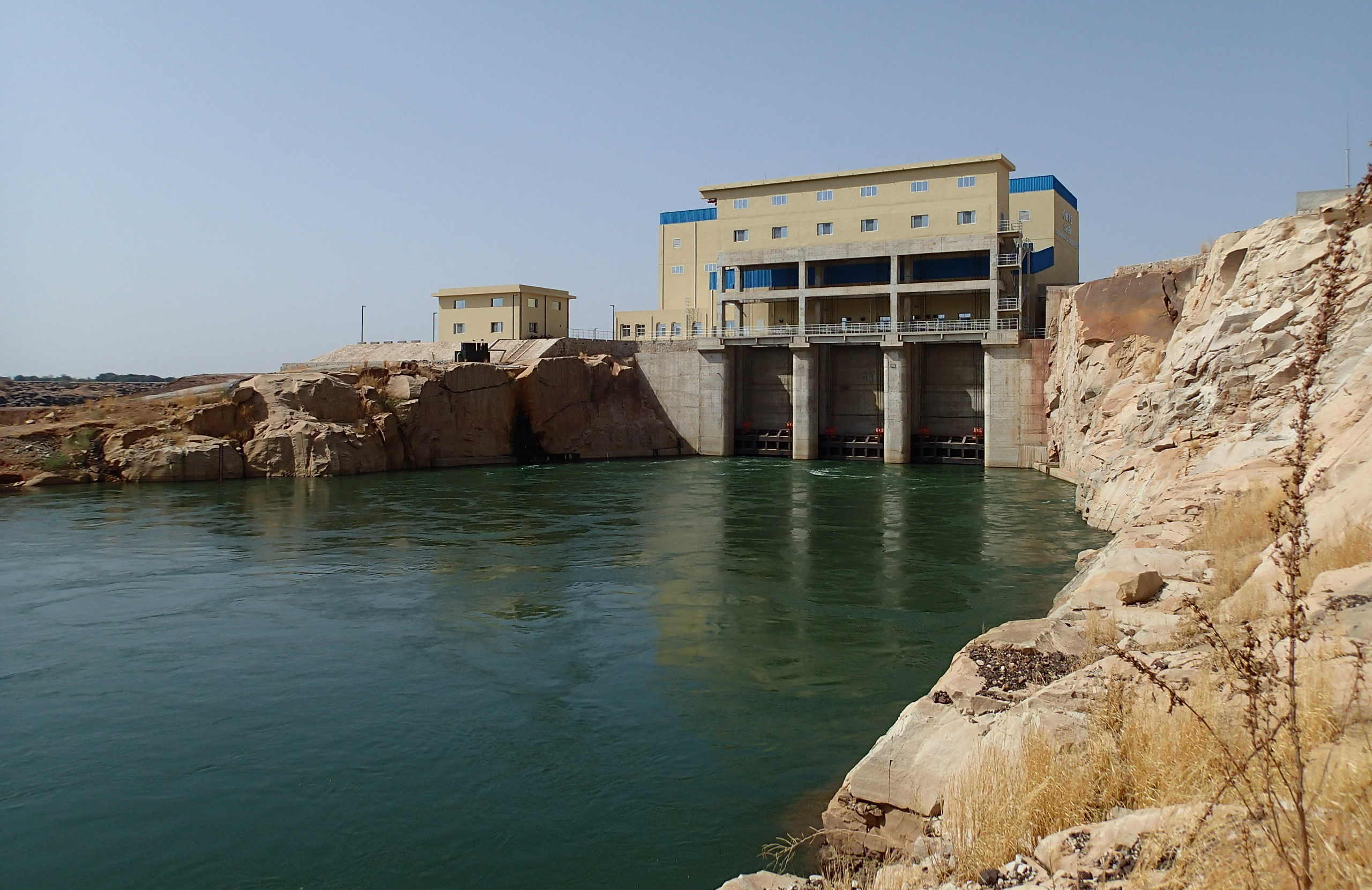
- Plant in 2014

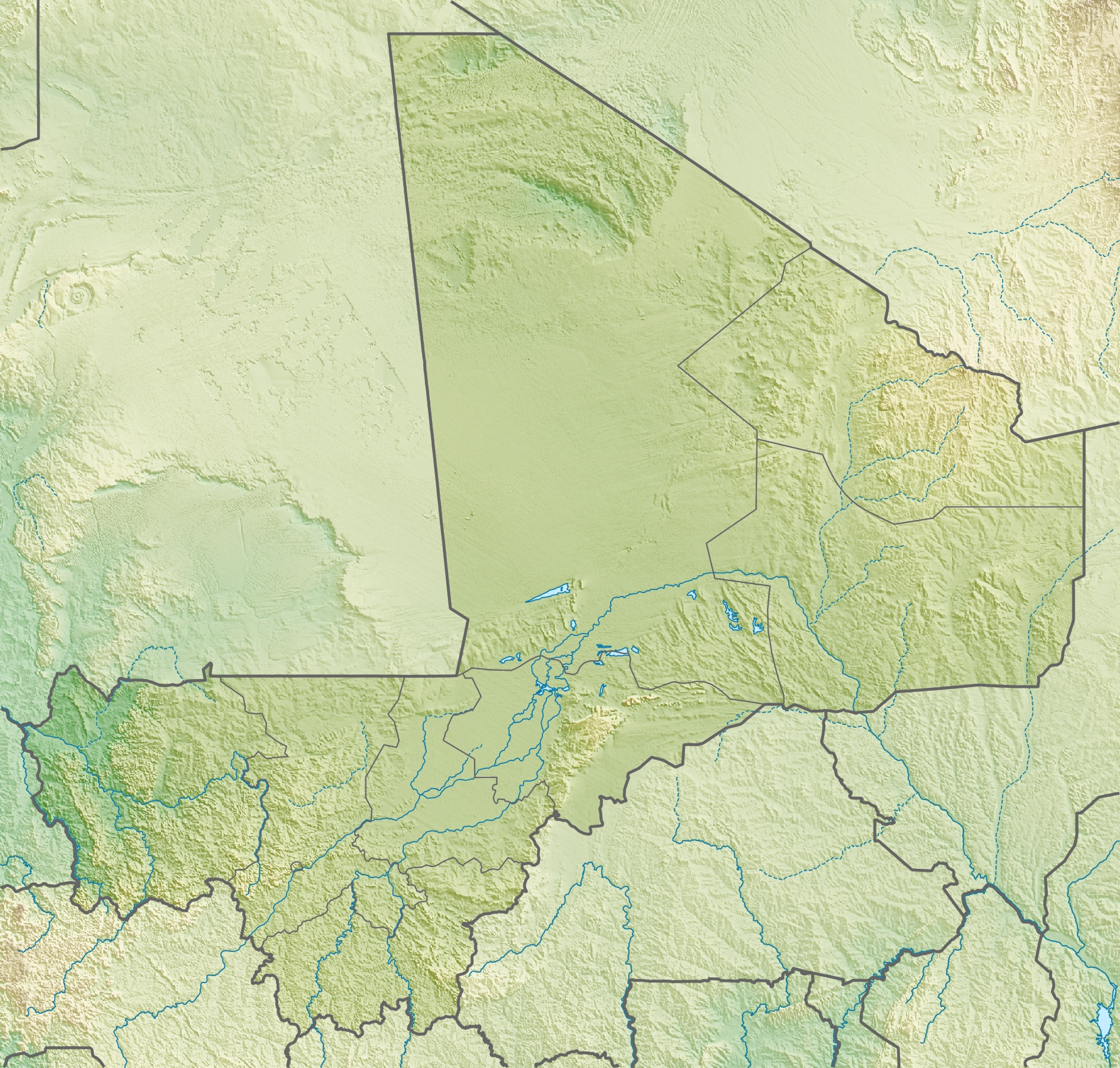
- Location within Mali
- Official name: Félou Hydroelectric Plant
- Country: Mali
- Location: Kayes Region
- Coordinates: 14°21′13″N 11°20′43″W
- Purpose: Power
- Status: Operational
- Construction began: 2009
- Opening date: 1927; 99 years ago
- Construction cost: 242 million US dollars (est.)

Dam and spillways
- Type of dam: Weir
- Impounds: Sénégal River
- Height: 2 m (6 ft 7 in)
- Length: 945 m (3,100 ft)

Power Station
- Operators: Operator: ESKOM; Owner: Société de Gestion de l'Energie de Manantali (SOGEM)
- Commission date: 2014
- Type: Run-of-the-river
- Hydraulic head: 13.8 m (45 ft)
- Turbines: 3 x 21 MW bulb-type
- Installed capacity: 62.3 MW (83,500 hp) (max. planned)
- Annual generation: 320–350 GWh (1,200–1,300 TJ)

The Félou Hydroelectric Plant (French: Centrale hydroélectrique de Félou) is a hydroelectric installation at the Félou Falls on the Sénégal River in Mali. It has three water turbines capable of generating 62.3 MW. The current power station replaced an older one built in the 1920s. Construction of the new power station began in October 2009 and was financed by the World Bank. It is the third Senegal River Basin Development Authority project on the river and was completed in 2014. The existing weir was refurbished with the previous 2 metres (6.6 ft) height maintained. In 1927, the previous hydroelectric power station was commissioned. It was refurbished in 1992 and had an installed capacity of 600 kW.

At maximum output, the three 21 MW turbines pass a total of 500 cubic metres per second (18,000 cu ft/s) of water. Between August and November the water flowing in the river generally exceeds this value allowing the plant to operate at full capacity and the excess water to pass over the weir. During the dry season (December to July), the electricity generated is reduced to about a third of the maximum output as the flow of water is limited to the 150–200 cubic metres per second (5,300–7,100 cu ft/s) released from the Manantali Dam.

The total estimated cost is 241 million US dollars. The construction of the plant was completed in 2014.

== See also ==
- Manantali Dam – upstream
- Gouina Hydroelectric Plant – upstream
- Diama Dam – downstream
