= Jaume Ferrer =

14th-century Majorcan sailor and explorer

- Born: Palma, Majorca
- Died: after 10 August 1346
- Occupation: Ship captain
- Known for: Expedition to find the legendary "River of Gold"

Jaume Ferrer (Catalan pronunciation: [ˈʒawmə fəˈre]; fl. 1346) was a Majorcan sailor and explorer. He sailed from Majorca on 10 August 1346 to find the legendary "River of Gold," but the outcome of his quest and his fate are unknown. He is memorialized in his native city of Palma, Majorca.

== Expedition ==
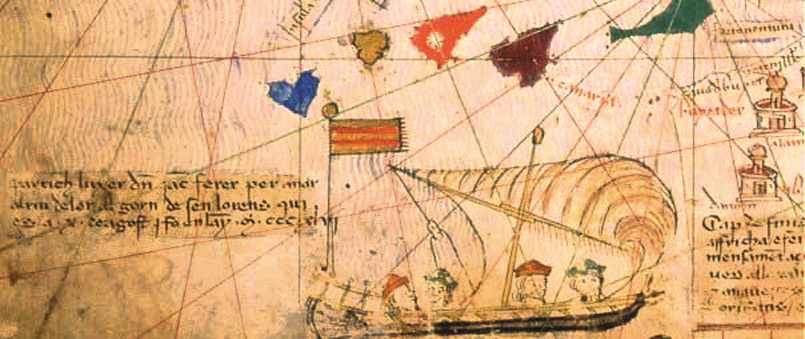
Detail of the Catalan Atlas of 1375 depicting the ship of Jaume Ferrer

Very little is known about Jaume Ferrer except that he was a Majorcan captain who set out in a galley in 1346 and sailed down the West African coast in an attempt to reach the legendary "River of Gold". The results of this expedition, including whether Ferrer survived the journey, are unknown. Some recent research tentatively identifies Jaume Ferrer as "Giacomino Ferrar di Casa Maveri", a second generation Genoese immigrant in Majorca.

Virtually the only information for his expedition is the depiction and note given in the Catalan Atlas of 1375, attributed to the Majorcan cartographer Abraham Cresques (correct patronymic: Cresques Abraham). In the bottom-left corner of the map there is a brightly-painted Aragonese-flagged vessel and a note indicating merely that "Jacme Ferrer" set out in an uxer on 10 August 1346 to search for the "Riu de l'Or" (Catalan for "River of Gold"). An uxer is a single-mast, square-rigged and oar-powered cargo galley, with rounded stern and low prow, commonly used to freight horses.

The geographic position of the ship (below the Canary Islands) suggests Ferrer probably sailed past Cape Bojador, at that time the non plus ultra of navigation, beyond which European ships dared not sail. If Ferrer survived and returned, then his feat preceded, by nearly a whole century, the famous successful passage of that cape by the Portuguese explorer Gil Eanes in 1434.

There is a sliver of additional information found in a note in the secret archives of the Republic of Genoa (uncovered in 1802), which refers to the expedition, noting that "Joannis Ferne", a Catalan, left "the city of the Majorcans" in a galleass on 10 July 1346 but the vessel was never heard of again, that he went searching for the Riu Auri ('River of Gold') because he heard that it was a collection point for "aurum de paiola" (perhaps "gold nuggets", but 'Paiola' has also been interpreted not as 'nugget', but as the name of a river island depicted in the 1367 Pizzigani map) that the people on the shores were all engaged in gold collection and that the river was wide and deep enough for the largest ships.

The "River of Gold", frequently spoken of by trans-Saharan traders, was a reference to the Senegal River that flowed into the heart of the gold-producing Mali Empire. The Genoese note refers to it also by the alternative name of Vedamel – almost certainly a derivation from Arabic, probably Wad al-mal ('river of treasure') or possibly, by transcription error, Wad al-Nill ('river of Nile – the Senegal was also long known as the 'Western Nile').

== Memorials ==
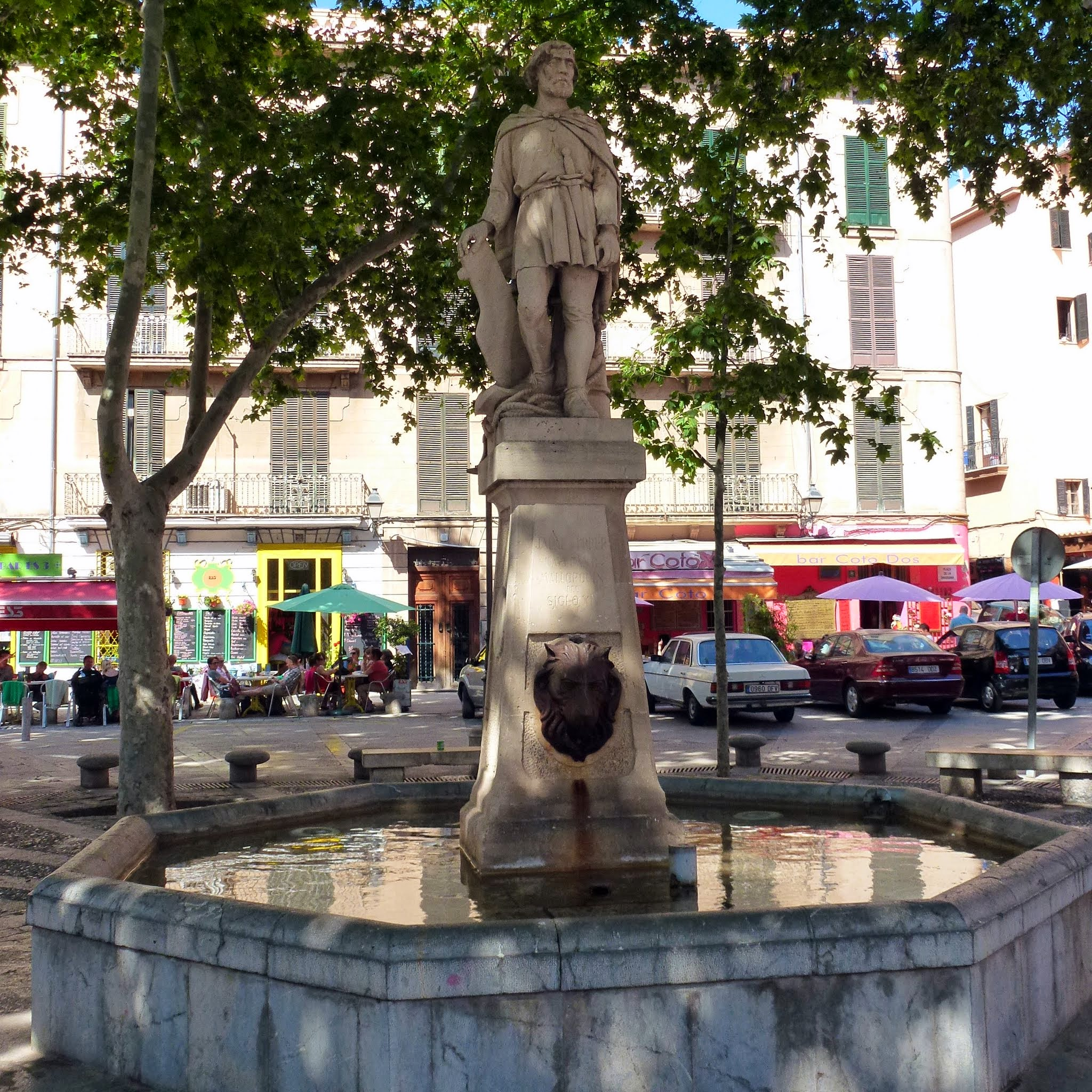
Statue of Jaume Ferrer in Palma

Despite the sparse information, Jaume Ferrer is memorialized in his native city of Palma, in Majorca, by a street name, a statue in the Plaça de les Drassanes and a relief in the town hall. The statue is a reproduction of one commissioned by the city hall and sculpted by Jacint Mateu around 1843, but replaced in 1914 by a copy with some modifications by Joan Grauches. The original is in the old Consolat de Mar building in Palma. The Atlas's ship is reproduced on a monumental sundial on the city's maritime promenade.

== See also ==
- List of people who disappeared mysteriously at sea
- Río de Oro, a former Spanish province in northwest Africa

== Sources ==
- Fernández-Armesto, F. (2007). Before Columbus: exploration and colonisation from the Mediterranean to the Atlantic 1229–1492. Philadelphia: University of Pennsylvania Press.
- Betz, R.L. (2007) The Mapping of Africa: a cartobibliography of printed maps of the African continent to 1700, Hes & de Graaf
- Russell, Peter E. (1995). Portugal, Spain, and the African Atlantic, 1343–1490: chivalry and crusade from John of Gaunt to Henry the Navigator. Varorium.
- Russell, Peter E. (2000). Prince Henry 'the Navigator': a life. New Haven, Conn: Yale University Press. ISBN 978-0-300-08233-3.
- Llompart, Gabriel (2000). "La Identitat de Jaume Ferrer, El Navegant (1346)" (PDF). Memòries de l'Acadèmia Mallorquina d'Estudis Genealògics, Heràldics i Històrics. 10. Palma: 7–20.
- Major, R.H. (1868). Life of Prince Henry of Portugal.
