= Manantali Dam =

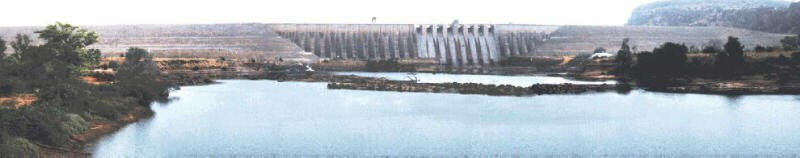
- Manantali Dam, 2001.

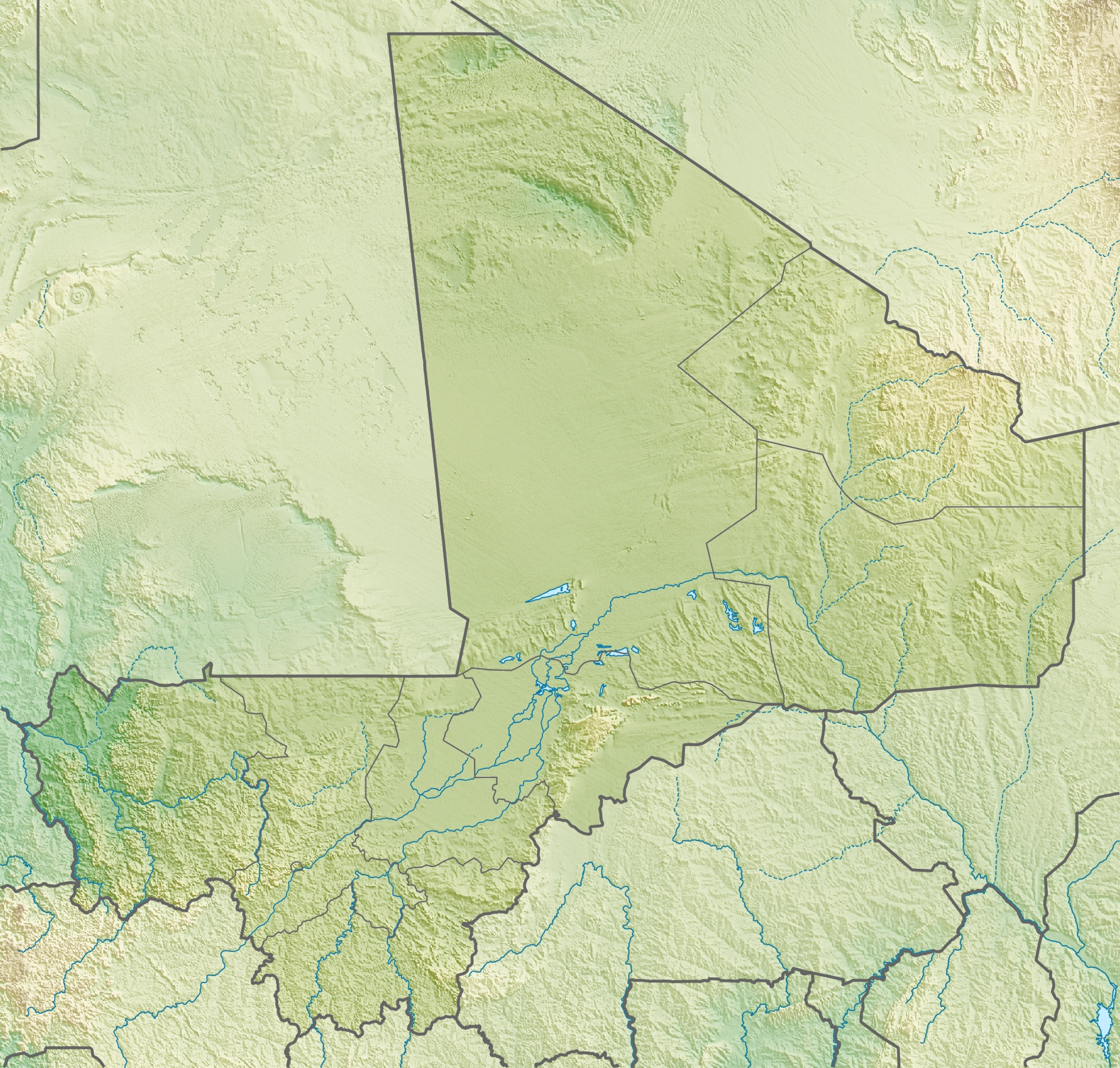
- Location within Mali
- Official name: Barrage de Manantali
- Location: Kayes Region, Mali
- Coordinates: 13°11′44″N 10°25′44″W
- Construction began: 1982
- Opening date: 1988
- Operators: Manantali Energy Management Company, the Société de gestion de l’énergie de Manantali (SOGEM)

Dam and spillways
- Impounds: Bafing River
- Height: 65 m (213 ft)
- Length: 1,460 m (4,790 ft)

Reservoir
- Creates: Lake Manantali
- Total capacity: 11.3×10^{9} m^{3}
- Surface area: 477

Power Station
- Commission date: 2001
- Turbines: 5 x 40 MW Kaplan-type
- Installed capacity: 200 MW

The Manantali Dam (French: Barrage de Manantali) is a multi-purpose dam on the Bafing river in the Senegal River basin, 90 kilometres (56 mi) to the south-east of Bafoulabé, in Mali's Kayes Region.

== History ==
Early planning for the dam began in 1972 when the Organization for the Development of the Senegal River (Organisation pour la mise en valeur du fleuve Sénégal, or OMVS) was set up by Mali, Mauritania and Senegal to develop the agricultural and hydropower potential of the basin. The World Bank declined to fund the dam in 1979, considering it an unreasonable investment. However, financing was secured mainly from Europe and construction on the dam began in 1982. It was completed in 1988, but without the hydropower plant. In 1989 the Mauritania–Senegal Border War stopped all work on the project. A Swiss journalist who visited Manantali in 1988 described the project as a "luxury car without a motor". In 1993 Carl–Dieter Spranger, then Germany's minister for development assistance, called Manantali an "act of economic and environmental nonsense". When the conflict subsided in 1991 the OMVS sought a new loan package for the hydropower plant, which was finally put together in 1997. The dam began to produce electricity for Senegal, Mali and Mauritania in 2001.

Today the dam is managed by the tripartite Manantali Energy Management Company, the Société de gestion de l’énergie de Manantali (SOGEM) created in 1997. SOGEM in turn has signed a 15-year concession contract with the private company EEM, a subsidiary of the South African national power company ESKOM, to operate the plant. OMVS is represented on the board of SOGEM. Citing "contractual difficulties in executing the contract", Eskom has entered into an agreement with SOGEM to terminate it as of 1 October 2011, according to the company's 2011 financial report.

== Cost and financing ==
The total cost of the dam, its associated hydropower plant, the deforestation of the future reservoir, studies and "complementary measures" was 1.02bn Euro. The construction cost of the related Diama Dam further downstream was an additional 50m Euro.

The dam was jointly financed by 16 donors, including German (14%) and French (13%) development cooperation, the African Development Bank, the World Bank, the European Investment Bank, Canada, Saudi Arabia, Kuwait and the United Nations Development Program. The three benefiting African countries also contributed to the financing. 64% of the foreign financing was through soft loans and 36% through grants. The European Community, the Islamic Development Bank, the West African Development Bank, and the Nordic Development Fund also contributed to the financing. The government of Norway had declined to finance the dam because of concerns about its health impact.

== Benefits ==
Map of the Senegal river basin. The Manantali dam is shown in the Southeastern corner of the basin.

The expected benefits included electricity generation, increased agricultural production through irrigation and improved river navigability.

Electricity generation. A 2008 evaluation of the dam conducted by three financiers (EIB, German KfW and French AFD) concluded that the main benefit of the dam is the generation of hydro-power, where the production of 740 GWh per year exceeded expectations of 540 GWh. About 55% of the electricity is used in Mali, 30% in Senegal and 15% in Mauritania. In 2006 in Mali more than 90% of all electricity generated came from Manantali, in Mauritania 34% and in Senegal 13%. The dam has not resolved the power problem of the three countries, where power outages regularly occur and the few existing industries have to produce their own power. As for the economic efficiency of the project, the European evaluation calculated an economic rate of return of the hydro-power component of 8%. A World Bank evaluation even calculated an economic rate of return of 12 to 24%. The plant load factor of the planned hydro-power plant - the expected electricity production divided by the potential production if the power plant was utilized permanently at full capacity, is 42% compared to 45-60% for other hydro-power plants. However, these economic benefits did not translate into financial benefits for two reasons: First, bulk electricity tariffs were set at only about half of production costs (4.7 Euro Cents/kWh compared to 8.8 Cents). Second, the national power utilities of the three countries that buy the electricity in bulk regularly pay only about half their bills. The entity in charge of operating the hydro-power plant, SOGEM, thus accumulates deficits. A Hydrology Risk Fund was to be gradually replenished in order to pay for operating costs of the plant in the case of a revenue shortfall due to drought. The Fund received only limited contributions, since the payments earmarked for the fund were instead used for rural electrification in areas near the power transmission lines in response to pressure from local communities.

The agricultural benefits achieved through the dam were "below reasonable expectations". The dam irrigates an additional 78,100 hectares (781 square kilometres) of land in Senegal (54,700 hectares), Mauritania (20,400 ha) and Mali (3,000 ha), which actually exceeds expectations. However, yields remain low and only a single crop is harvested each year, partly because in all three countries producer prices for rice are set by the governments below the world market price, thus providing little incentive for farmers to increase production to its full potential. The stated project goal to increase food self-sufficiency has not been achieved: The share of rice self-sufficiency decreased in Senegal from 23% in 1980 to 20% in 2006 and rice production has stagnated since 1990. The share of cereal self-sufficiency in Mauritania decreased from 80% to 30%.

The objective of increasing the navigability of the Senegal River between Saint-Louis, Senegal and Ambidédi, Mali had already been abandoned in 1980 prior to its construction because it proved unfeasible.

== Environmental and social impact ==
The dam has proved controversial for its displacement of 10,000 people from the flooded area, and for its environmental and health-related impacts. In the irrigated areas the incidence of water-borne diseases such as bilharzia increased substantially, while local fisheries declined sharply. The annual flood of the Senegal river had been the basis of flood recession agriculture, fishing, and cattle grazing. With the Manantali dam, the annual flood has been reduced to an artificial two–week flood. Traditionally, the Senegal river inundated about 150,000 hectares on average, and up to 350,000 hectares in high–flow years. In 1999, this was expected to be reduced to between 30,000 and 50,000 hectares in an average year, and much less in a dry year. It has been estimated that about 370,000 people had lived from flood recession agriculture in the Senegal river valley before the dam was built. Flood recession agriculture has now completely disappeared. Only a small share of the farmers affected was compensated with land irrigated from the Manantali reservoir.

== See also ==
- Gouina Hydroelectric Plant – downstream
- Félou Hydroelectric Plant – downstream
- Diama Dam – downstream
