= Senegal River =

River in West Africa

Senegal River Serer: Seen O Gal Wolof: Dexug Senegaal Arabic: نهر السنغال French: Fleuve Sénégal
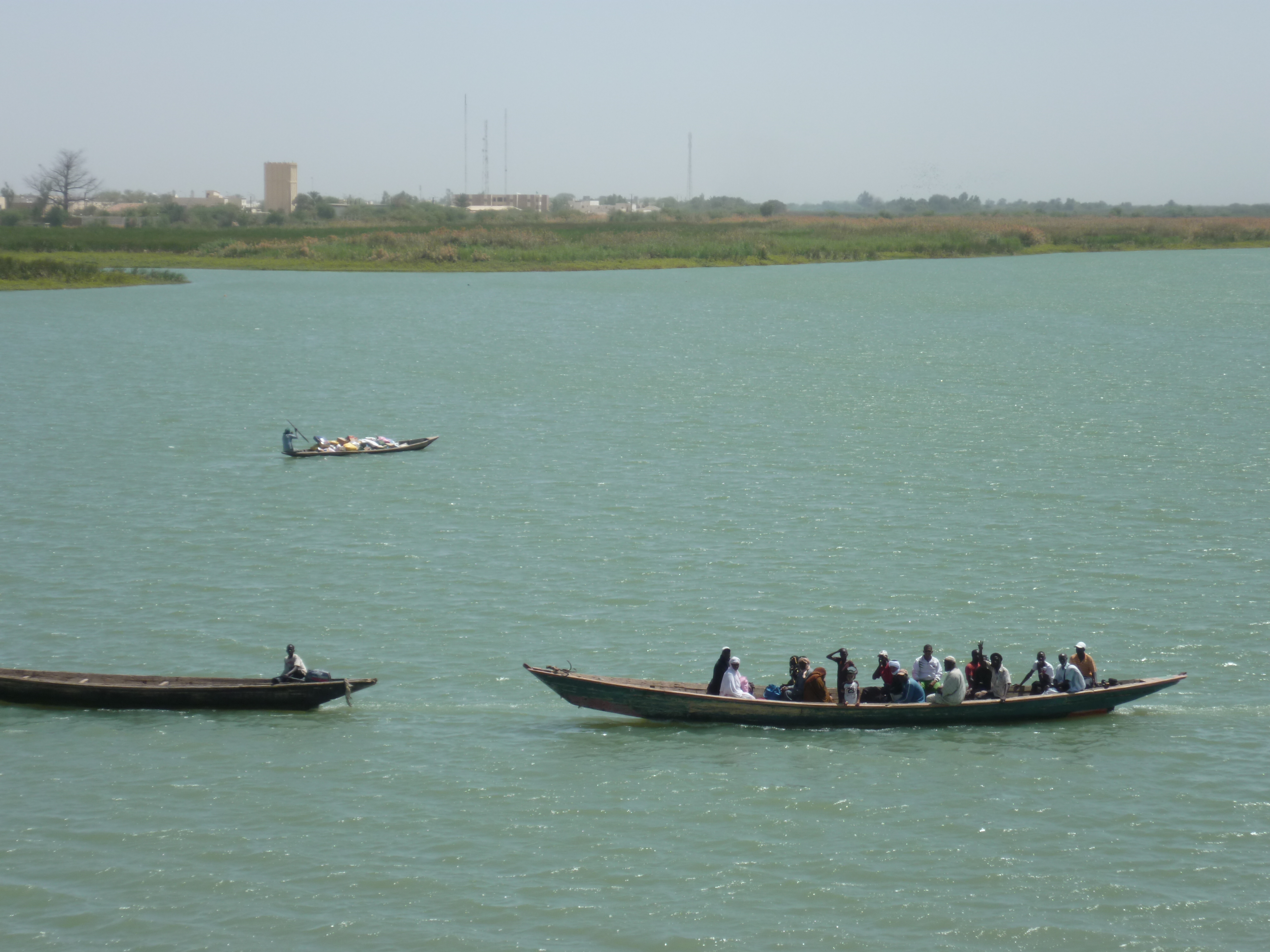
- Boats on the Senegal River, on the border between Senegal and Mauritania

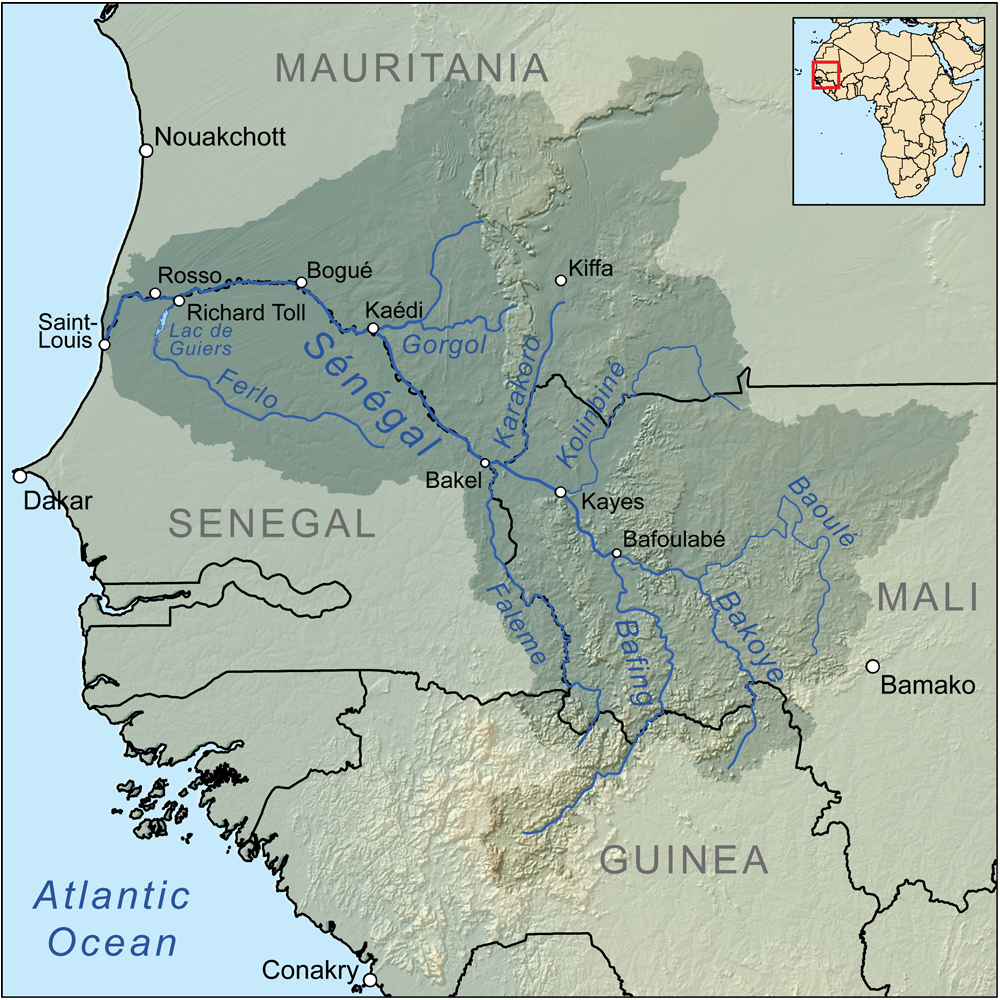
- Map of the Senegal River drainage basin.

Location
- Country: Senegal, Mauritania, Mali

Physical characteristics
- Source: Bakoy River
  - location: Menien-Koma, Guinea
  - coordinates: 11°50′N 9°45′W
  - elevation: 760 m (2,490 ft)
- 2nd source: Bafing River
  - location: Foranruel, Guinea
  - coordinates: 10.395°N 12.135°W
  - elevation: 750 m (2,460 ft)
- Source confluence
  - location: Bafoulabé, Mali
  - coordinates: 13°48′47″N 10°49′41″W
  - elevation: 83 m (272 ft)
- Mouth: Atlantic Ocean
  - location: Saint-Louis, Senegal
  - coordinates: 15°56′17″N 16°30′29″W
  - elevation: 0 m (0 ft)
- Length: 1,086 km (675 mi)
- Basin size: 337,000 km^{2} (130,000 mi^{2})
- Discharge
  - average: 680 m^{3}/s (24,000 cu ft/s)

Senegal River at Dagana, Senegal

Average monthly flow (m^{3}/s) at the Dagana hydrometric station over the period 1903–1974

The Senegal River (Serer: "Seen O Gal" or "Senegal" - compound of the Serer term "Seen" or "Sene" or "Sen" (from Roog Seen, Supreme Deity in Serer religion) and "O Gal" (meaning "body of water")); Wolof: Dexug Senegaal, Arabic: نهر السنغال, romanized: Nahr as-Siniġāl, Hassaniyya pronunciation: [nahrˤ əs.säjnigaːl], French: Fleuve Sénégal) is a 1086-kilometre-long (675 mi) river in West Africa; much of its length marks part of the border between Senegal and Mauritania. It has a drainage basin of 270000 km^{2} (100000 sq mi), a mean flow of 680 m^{3}/s (24,000 cu ft/s), and an annual discharge of 21.5 km^{3} (5.2 cu mi). Important tributaries are the Falémé River, Karakoro River, and the Gorgol River. The river divides into two branches once it passes Kaédi. The left branch, called the Doué, runs parallel to the main river to the north. After 200 km (120 mi) the two branches rejoin a few kilometers downstream of Podor.

In 1972, Mali, Mauritania, and Senegal founded the Organisation pour la mise en valeur du fleuve Sénégal (OMVS) to manage the river basin. Guinea joined in 2005. As of 2012, only very limited use was made of the river for the transportation of goods and passengers. The OMVS have looked at the feasibility of creating a navigable channel 55 m (180 ft) in width between the small town of Ambidédi in Mali, and Saint-Louis, a distance of 905 km (562 mi). It would give landlocked Mali a direct route to the Atlantic Ocean.

The aquatic fauna in the Senegal River basin is closely associated with that of the Gambia River basin, and the two are usually combined under a single ecoregion known as the Senegal-Gambia Catchments. Only three species of frogs, and one fish are endemic to this ecoregion.

The river has two large dams along its course. The Manantali Dam in Mali, and the Maka-Diama Dam downstream on the Mauritania-Senegal border. In between is the Félou Hydroelectric Plant, built in 1927, but replaced in 2014. The construction of the Gouina Hydroelectric Plant upstream of Felou at Gouina Falls began in 2013.

== Geography ==
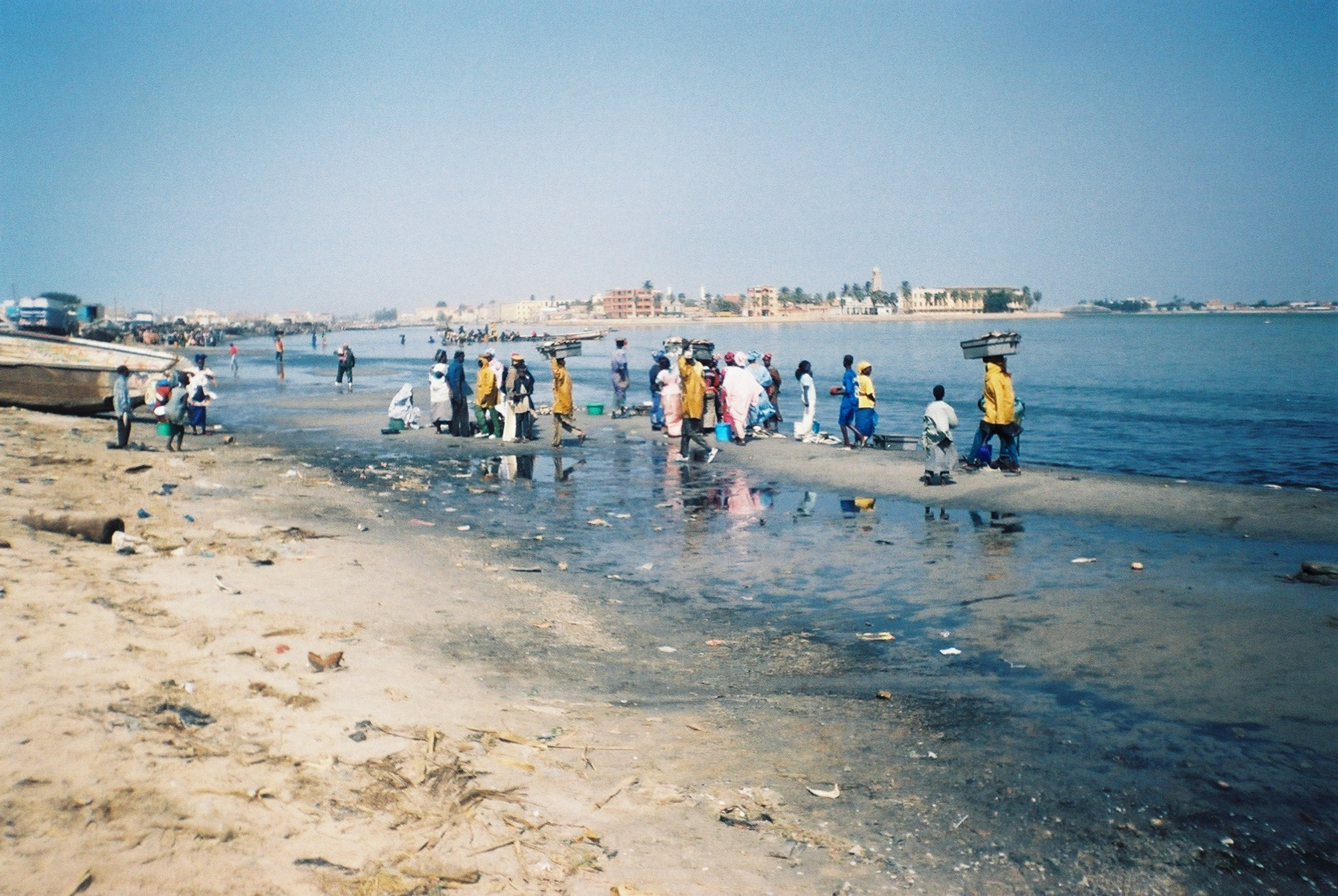
Fishermen on the bank of the Senegal River estuary at the outskirts of Saint-Louis, Senegal

The Senegal's headwaters are the Semefé (Bakoye), and Bafing rivers which both originate in Guinea; they form a small part of the Guinea–Mali border before coming together at Bafoulabé in Mali. From there, the Senegal river flows west and then north through Talari Gorges near Galougo and over the Gouina Falls, then flows more gently past Kayes, where it receives the Kolimbiné. After flowing together with the Karakoro, it prolongs the former's course along the Mali–Mauritania border for some tens of kilometers till Bakel where it flows together with the Falémé River, which also has its source in Guinea, subsequently runs along a small part of the Guinea-Mali frontier to then trace most of the Senegal-Mali border up to Bakel. The Senegal further flows through semi-arid land in the north of Senegal, forming the border with Mauritania and into the Atlantic. In Kaedi, it accepts the Gorgol from Mauritania, flowing through Boghé it reaches Richard Toll where it is joined by the Ferlo coming from inland Senegal's Lac de Guiers. It passes through Rosso and approaching its mouth, around the Senegalese island on which the city of Saint-Louis is located, to then turn south. It is separated from the Atlantic Ocean by a thin strip of sand called the Langue de Barbarie before it pours into the ocean itself.

The river has two large dams along its course, the multi-purpose Manantali Dam in Mali, and the Maka-Diama Dam downstream on the Mauritania-Senegal border, near the outlet to the sea, preventing access of salt water upstream. In between Manantali and Maka-Diama is the Félou Hydroelectric Plant which was originally completed in 1927 and uses a weir. The power station was replaced in 2014. In 2013, construction of the Gouina Hydroelectric Plant upstream of Felou at Gouina Falls began.

The Senegal River has a drainage basin of 270000 km^{2} (100000 sq mi), a mean flow of 680 m^{3}/s (24000 cu ft/s), and an annual discharge of 21.5 km^{3} (5.2 cu mi). Important tributaries are the Falémé River, Karakoro River, and the Gorgol River.

Downstream of Kaédi the river divides into two branches. The left branch called the Doué runs parallel to the main river to the north. After 200 km (120 mi) the two branches rejoin a few kilometres downstream of Pondor. The long strip of land between the two branches is called the Île á Morfil.

In 1972, Mali, Mauritania, and Senegal founded the Organisation pour la mise en valeur du fleuve Sénégal (OMVS) to manage the river basin. Guinea joined in 2005.

At the present time, only very limited use is made of the river for the transport of goods and passengers. The OMVS have looked at the feasibility of creating a navigable channel 55 m (180 ft) in width between the small town of Ambidédi in Mali, and Saint-Louis, a distance of 905 km (562 mi). It would give landlocked Mali a direct route to the Atlantic Ocean.

The aquatic fauna in the Senegal River basin is closely associated with that of the Gambia River basin, and the two are usually combined under a single ecoregion known as the Senegal-Gambia Catchments. Although the species richness is moderately high, only three species of frogs and one fish are endemic to this ecoregion.

== History ==
The area was previously occupied by the Serer people, who following their religious and ethnic persecution by Islamic forces in the 11th century, resulted in the Serer exodus to the south.

The existence of the Senegal River was known to the early Mediterranean civilizations. It or some other river was called Bambotus by Pliny the Elder (possibly from Phoenician "behemoth" for hippopotamus) and Nias by Claudius Ptolemy. It was visited by Hanno the Carthaginian around 450 BCE at his navigation from Carthage through the pillars of Herakles to Theon Ochema (Mount Cameroon?) in the Gulf of Guinea. There was trade from here to the Mediterranean World, until the destruction of Carthage, and its west African trade net in 146 BCE.

=== Arab sources ===
In the Early Middle Ages (c. 800 CE), the Senegal River restored contact with the Mediterranean world with the establishment of the Trans-Saharan trade route between Morocco and the Ghana Empire. Arab geographers, like al-Masudi of Baghdad (957), al-Bakri of Spain (1068) and al-Idrisi of Sicily (1154), provided some of the earliest descriptions of the Senegal River. Early Arab geographers believed the upper Senegal River and the upper Niger River were connected to each other, and formed a single river flowing from east to west, which they called the "Western Nile". (In fact, some of the headwaters of the Senegal River are near the Niger River in Mali and Guinea.) It was believed to be either a western branch of the Egyptian Nile River or drawn from the same source (variously conjectured to some great internal lakes of the Mountains of the Moon, or Ptolemy's Gir (Γειρ) or the Biblical Gihon stream).

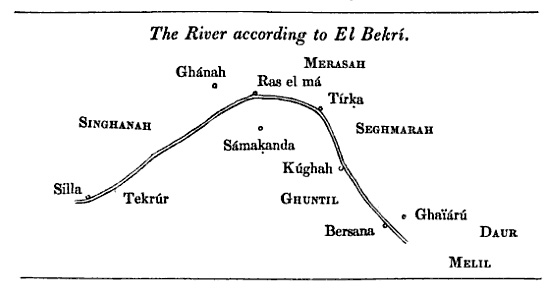
Western Nile (Senegal-Niger River) according to al-Bakri (1068)

Arab geographers Abd al-Hassan Ali ibn Omar (1230), Ibn Said al-Maghribi (1274), and Abulfeda (1331), label the Senegal as the "Nile of Ghana" (Nil Gana or Nili Ganah).

As the Senegal River reached into the heart of the gold-producing Ghana Empire and later the Mali Empire, Trans-Saharan traders gave the Senegal its famous nickname as the "River of Gold". The Trans-Saharan stories about the "River of Gold" reached the ears of Sub-Alpine European merchants that frequented the ports of Morocco and the lure proved irresistible. Arab historians report at least three separate Arab maritime expeditions - the last one organized by a group of eight mughrarin ("wanderers") of Lisbon (before 1147) - that tried to sail down the Atlantic coast, possibly in an effort find the mouth of the Senegal.

=== Cartographic representation ===
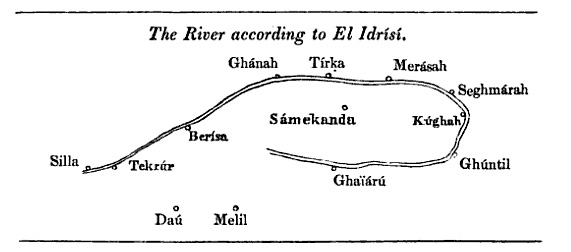
Western Nile (Senegal-Niger River) according to Muhammad al-Idrisi (1154)

Drawing from Classical legend and Arab sources, the "River of Gold" found its way into European maps in the 14th century. In the Hereford Mappa Mundi (c. 1300), there is a river labelled "Nilus Fluvius" drawn parallel to the coast of Africa, albeit without communication with Atlantic (it ends in a lake). It depicts some giant ants digging up gold dust from its sands, with the note "Hic grandes formice auream serican [or servant] arenas" ("Here great ants guard gold sands"). In the mappa mundi made by Pietro Vesconte for the c. 1320 atlas of Marino Sanuto, there is an unnamed river stemming from the African interior and opening in the Atlantic ocean. The 1351 Medici-Laurentian Atlas shows both the Egyptian Nile and the western Nile stemming from the same internal mountain range, with the note that "Ilic coligitur aureaum". The portolan chart of Giovanni da Carignano (1310s-1320s) has the river with the label, iste fluuis exit de nilo ubi multum aurum repperitur.

In the more accurately-drawn portolan charts, starting with the 1367 chart of Domenico and Francesco Pizzigano and carried on in the 1375 Catalan Atlas, the 1413 chart of the Catalan converso Mecia de Viladestes, etc. the "River of Gold" is depicted (if only speculatively), draining into the Atlantic Ocean somewhere just south of Cape Bojador. The legend of Cape Bojador as a terrifying obstacle, the 'cape of no return' to European sailors, emerged around the same time (possibly encouraged by Trans-Saharan traders who did not want to see their land route sidestepped by sea).

The river is frequently depicted with a great river island midway, the "Island of Gold", first mentioned by al-Masudi, and famously called "Wangara" by al-Idrisi and "Palolus" in the 1367 Pizzigani brothers chart. It is conjectured that this riverine "island" is in fact just the Bambuk-Buré goldfield district, which is practically surrounded on all sides by rivers - the Senegal river to the north, the Falémé River to the west, the Bakhoy to the east and the Niger and Tinkisso to the south.

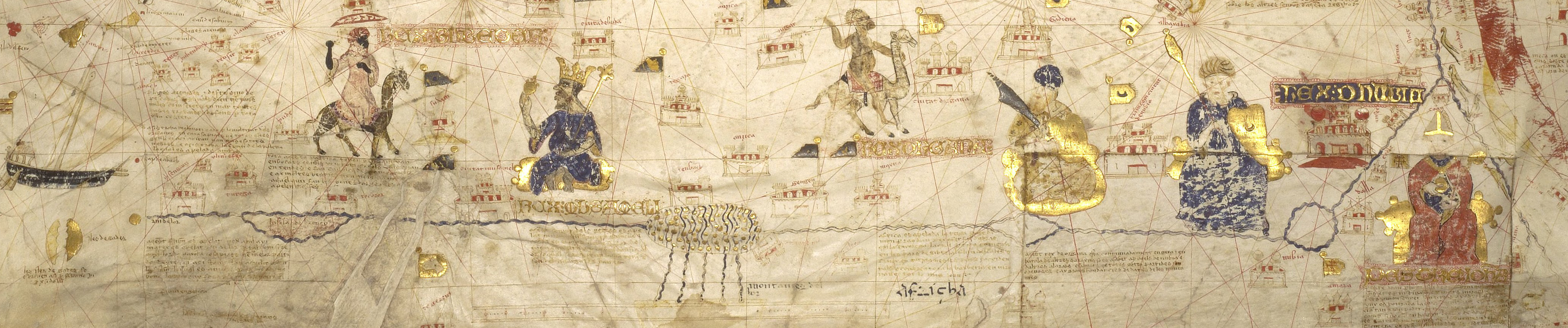
Course of the "River of Gold" (Senegal-Niger) in the 1413 portolan chart of Mecia de Viladestes.

The 1413 portolan chart of Mecia de Viladestes gives perhaps the most detailed depiction of the early state of European knowledge about the Senegal River prior to the 1440s. Viladestes labels it "River of Gold" ("riu del or") and locates it a considerable distance south of Cape Bojador (buyeter) - indeed, south of a mysterious "cap de abach" (possibly Cape Timris). There are extensive notes about the plentifulness of ivory and gold in the area, including a note that reads

"This river is called Wad al-Nil and also is called the River of Gold, for one can here obtain the gold of Palolus. And know that the greater part of those that live here occupy themselves collecting gold on the shores of the river which, at its mouth, is a league wide, and deep enough for the largest ship of the world."

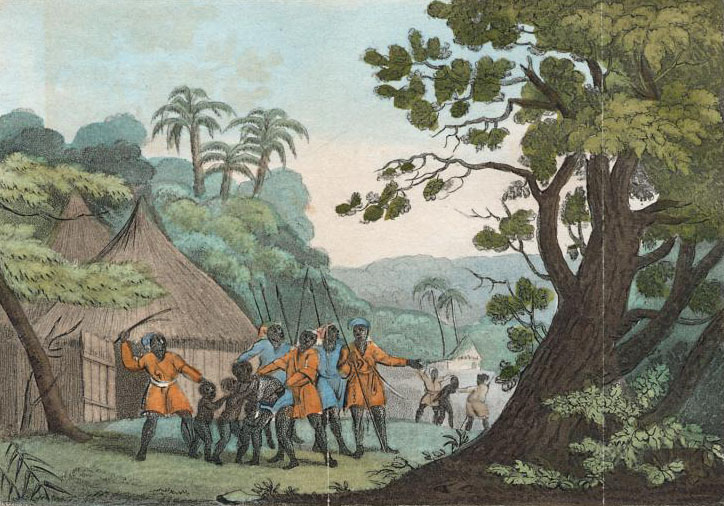
Slave trade along the Senegal River, kingdom of Cayor

The galley of Jaume Ferrer is depicted off the coast on the left, with a quick note about his 1346 voyage. The golden round island at the mouth of the Senegal River is the indication (customary on portolan charts) of river mouth bars or islands - in this case, probably a reference to the Langue de Barbarie or the island of Saint-Louis). The first town, by the mouth of the Senegal, is called "isingan" (arguably the etymological source of the term "Senegal"). East of that, the Senegal forms a riverine island called "insula de bronch" (Île à Morfil). By its shores lies the city of "tocoror" (Takrur). Above it is a depiction of the Almoravid general Abu Bakr ibn Umar ("Rex Bubecar") on a camel. Further east, along the river, is the seated emperor (mansa) of Mali ("Rex Musa Meli", prob. Mansa Musa), holding a gold nugget. His capital, "civitat musa meli" is shown on the shores of the river, and the range of the Emperor of Mali's sway is suggested by all the black banners (an inscription notes "This lord of the blacks is called Musa Melli, Lord of Guinea, the greatest noble lord of these parts for the abundance of the gold which is collected in his lands". Curiously, there is a defiant gold-bannered town south of the river, labelled "tegezeut" (probably the Ta'adjast of al-Idrisi), and might be an inchoate reference to Djenné.

East of Mali, the river forms a lake or "Island of Gold" shown here studded with river-washed gold nuggets (this is what the Pizzigani brothers called the island of "Palolus", and most commentators take to indicate the Bambuk-Buré goldfields). It is connected by many streams to the southerly "mountains of gold" (labelled "montanies del lor", the Futa Djallon/Bambouk Mountains and Loma Mountains of Sierra Leone). It is evident the Senegal river morphs east, unbroken, into the Niger River - the cities of "tenbuch" (Timbuktu), "geugeu" (Gao) and "mayna" (Niamey? or a misplaced Niani?) are denoted along the same single river. South of them (barely visible) are what seem like the towns of Kukiya (on the eastern shore of the Island of Gold), and east of that, probably Sokoto (called "Zogde" in the Catalan Atlas) and much further southeast, probably Kano.

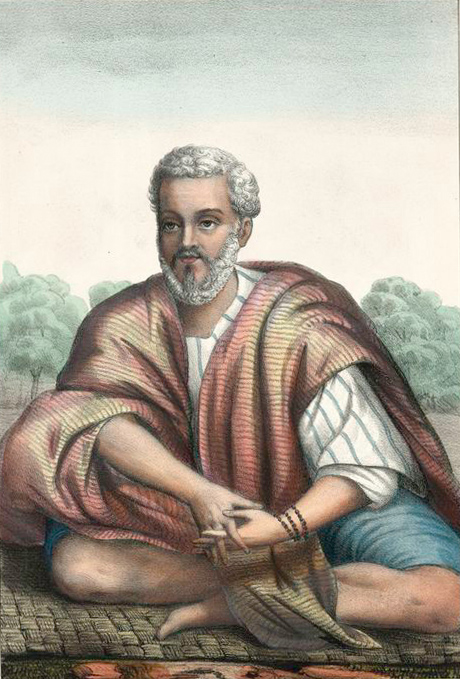
Moorish man, Trarza region of the Senegal River Valley, Abbé David Boilat, 1853

North of the Senegal-Niger are the various oases and stations of the trans-Saharan route ("Tutega" = Tijigja, "Anzica" = In-Zize, "Tegaza" = Taghaza, etc.) towards the Mediterranean coast. There is an unlabeled depiction of a black African man on a camel traveling from "Uuegar" (prob. Hoggar) to the town of "Organa" ("ciutat organa", variously identified as Kanem or Ouargla or possibly even a misplaced depiction of Ghana - long defunct, but, on the other hand, contemporaneous with the depicted Abu Bakr). Nearby sits its Arab-looking king ("Rex Organa") holding a scimitar. The River of Gold is sourced at a circular island, what seem like the Mountains of the Moon (albeit unlabeled here). From this same source also flows north the White Nile towards Egypt, which forms the frontier between the Muslim "king of Nubia" ("Rex Onubia", his range depicted by crescent-on-gold banners) and the Christian Prester John ("Preste Joha"), i.e. the emperor of Ethiopia in the garb of a Christian bishop (coincidentally, this is the first visual depiction of Prester John on a portolan chart).

Uniquely, the Viladestes map shows another river, south of the Senegal, which it labels the "flumen gelica" (poss. angelica), which some have taken to depict the Gambia River. In the 1459 mappa mundi of Fra Mauro, drawn a half-century later, after the Portuguese had already visited the Senegal (albeit still trying to respect Classical sources), shows two parallel rivers running east to west, both of them sourced from the same great internal lake (which, Fra Mauro asserts, is also the same source as the Egyptian Nile). Mauro names the two parallel rivers differently, calling one "flumen Mas ("Mas River"), the other the "canal dal oro" ("Channel of Gold"), and makes the note that "Inne larena de questi do fiume se trova oro de paiola" ("In the sands of both these rivers gold of 'palola' may be found"), and nearer to the sea, "Qui se racoce oro" ("Here gold is collected"), and finally, on the coast, "Terra de Palmear" ("Land of Palms"). It is notable that Fra Mauro knew of the error of Henry the Navigator's captains about the Daklha inlet, which Mauro carefully labels "Reodor" ("Rio do Ouro", Western Sahara), distinctly from the "Canal del Oro" (Senegal River).

=== European contact ===
Christian Europeans soon began attempting to find the sea route to the mouth of the Senegal. The first known effort may have been by the Genoese brothers Vandino and Ugolino Vivaldi, who set out down the coast in 1291 in a pair of ships (nothing more is heard of them). In 1346, the Majorcan sailor, Jaume Ferrer set out on a galley with the explicit objective of finding the "River of Gold" (Riu de l'Or), where he heard that most people along its shores were engaged in the collection of gold and that the river was wide and deep enough for the largest ships. Nothing more is heard of him either. In 1402, after establishing the first European colony on the Canary Islands, the French Norman adventurers Jean de Béthencourt and Gadifer de la Salle set about immediately probing the African coast, looking for directions to the mouth of Senegal.

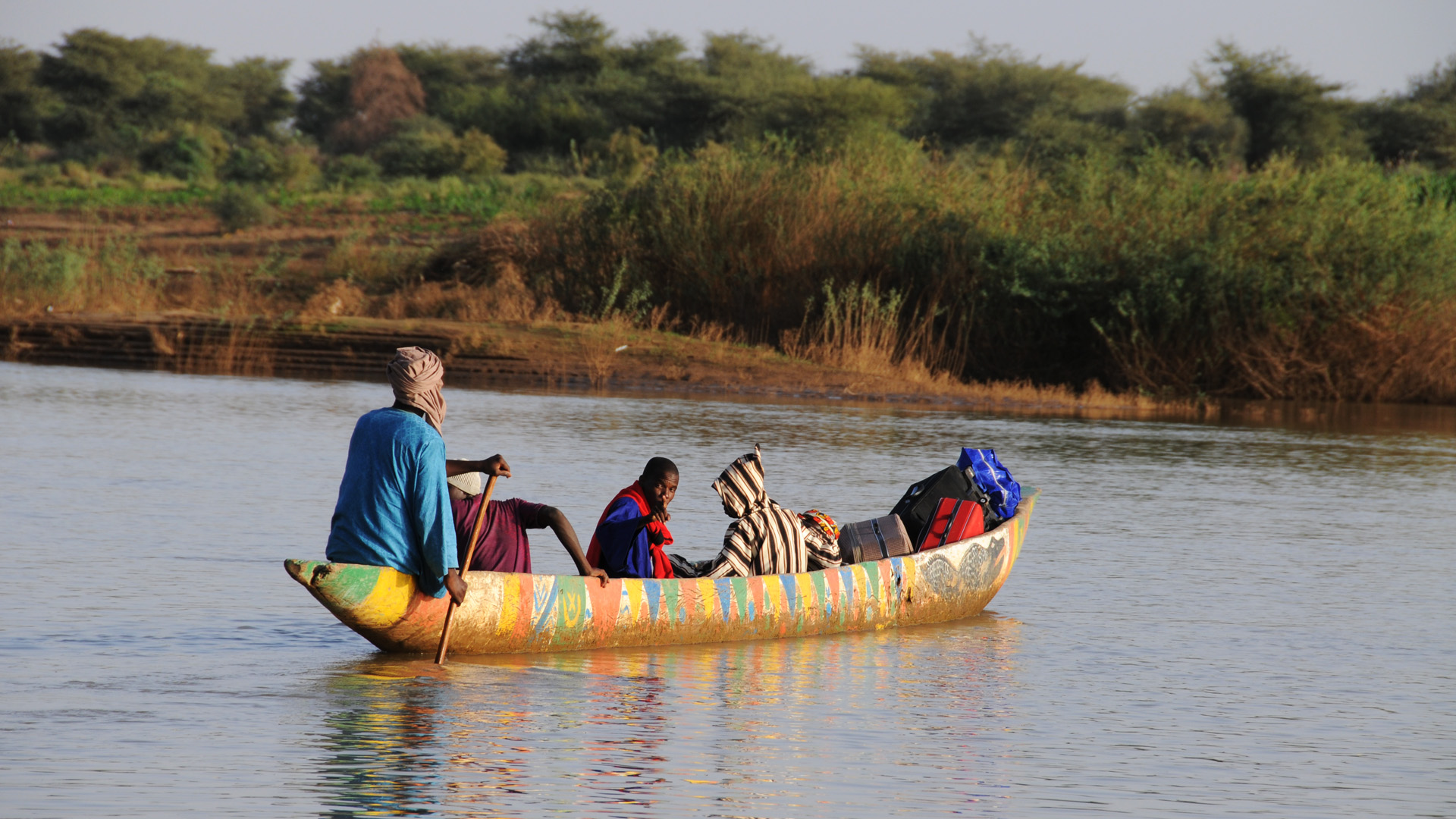
Boat on Senegal River

The project of finding the Senegal was taken up in the 1420s by the Portuguese Prince Henry the Navigator, who invested heavily to reach it. In 1434, one of Henry's captains, Gil Eanes, finally surpassed Cape Bojador and returned to tell about it. Henry immediately dispatched a follow-up mission in 1435, under Gil Eanes and Afonso Gonçalves Baldaia. Going down the coast, they turned around the al-Dakhla peninsula in the Western Sahara and emerged into an inlet, which they excitedly believed to be the mouth of the Senegal River. The name they mistakenly bestowed upon the inlet - "Rio do Ouro" - is a name it would remain stuck with down to the 20th century.

Realizing the mistake, Henry kept pressing his captains further down the coast, and in 1445, the Portuguese captain Nuno Tristão finally reached the Langue de Barbarie, where he noticed the desert end and the treeline begin, and the population change from 'tawny' Sanhaja Berbers to 'black' Wolof people. Bad weather or lack of supplies prevented Tristão from actually reaching the mouth of the Senegal River, but he rushed back to Portugal to report he had finally found the "Land of the Blacks" (Terra dos Negros), and that the "Nile" was surely nearby. Shortly after (possibly still within that same year) another captain, Dinis Dias (sometimes given as Dinis Fernandes) was the first known European since antiquity to finally reach the mouth of the Senegal River. However, Dias did not sail upriver, but instead kept sailing down the Grande Côte to the bay of Dakar.

The very next year, in 1446, the Portuguese slave-raiding fleet of Lançarote de Freitas arrived at the mouth of the Senegal. One of its captains, Estêvão Afonso, volunteered to take a launch to explore upriver for settlements, thus becoming the first European to actually enter the Senegal river. He didn't get very far. Venturing ashore at one point along the river bank, Afonso tried to kidnap two Wolof children from a woodsman's hut. But he ran into their father, who proceeded to chase the Portuguese back to their launch and gave them such a beating that the explorers gave up on going any further, and turned back to the waiting caravels.

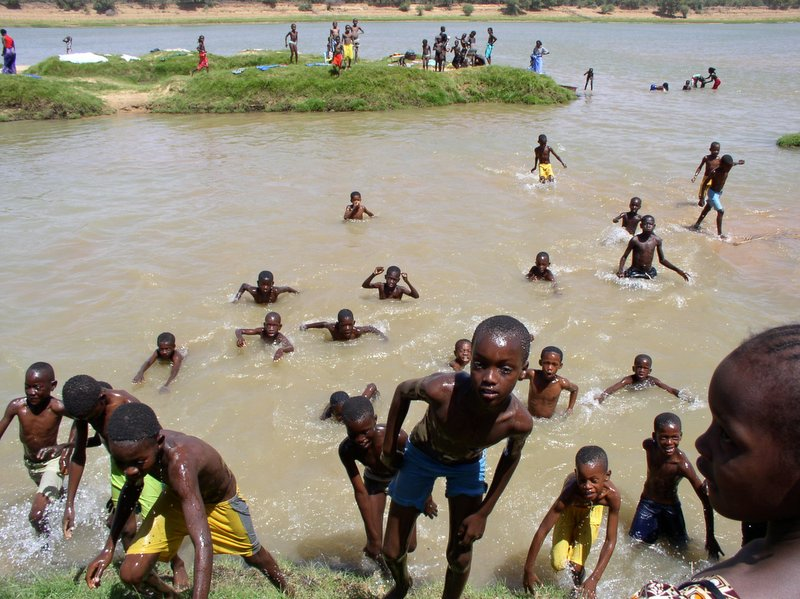
Young boys swimming in the Senegal River

Sometime between 1448 and 1455, the Portuguese captain Lourenço Dias opened regular trade contact on the Senegal River, with the Wolof statelets of Waalo (near the mouth of the Senegal River) and Cayor (a little below that), drumming up a profitable business exchanging Mediterranean goods (notably, horses) for gold and slaves. Chronicler Gomes Eanes de Zurara, writing in 1453, still called it the "Nile River", but Alvise Cadamosto, writing in the 1460s, was already calling it the "Senega" [sic], and it is denoted as Rio do Çanagà on most subsequent Portuguese maps of the age. Cadamosto relates the legend that both the Senegal and the Egyptian Nile were branches of the Biblical Gihon River that stems from the Garden of Eden and flows through Ethiopia. He also notes that the Senegal was called "the Niger" by the ancients - probably a reference to Ptolemy's legendary 'Nigir' (Νιγειρ) (below the Gir), which would be later identified by Leo Africanus with the modern Niger River. Much the same story is repeated by Marmol in 1573, with the additional note that both the Senegal River, and Gambia River were tributaries of the Niger River. However, the contemporary African atlas of Venetian cartographer Livio Sanuto, published in 1588, sketches the Senegal, the Niger and the Gambia as three separate, parallel rivers.

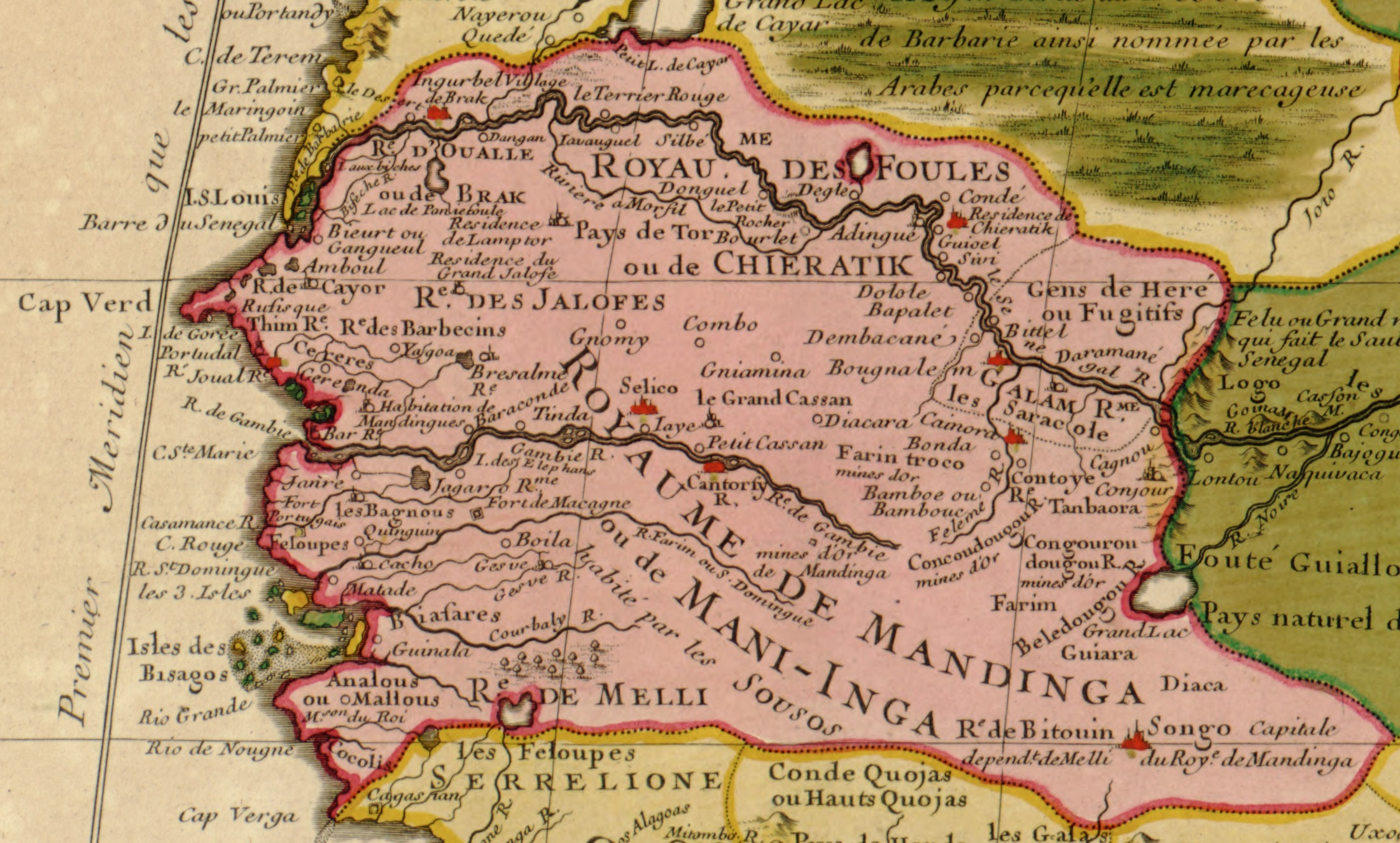
Senegambia region, detail from the map of Guillaume Delisle (1707), which still assumes the Senegal connected to the Niger; this would be corrected in subsequent edititions of Delisle's map (1722, 1727), where it was shown ending at a lake, south of the Niger.

Portuguese chronicler João de Barros (writing in 1552) says the river's original local Wolof name was Ovedech (which according to one source, comes from "vi-dekh", Wolof for "this river"). His contemporary, Damião de Góis (1567) records it as Sonedech (from "sunu dekh", Wolof for "our river"). Writing in 1573, the Spanish geographer Luis del Marmol Carvajal asserts that the Portuguese called it Zenega, the 'Zeneges' (Berber Zenaga) called it the Zenedec, the 'Gelofes' (Wolofs) call it Dengueh, the 'Tucorones' (Fula Toucouleur) called it Mayo, the 'Çaragoles' (Soninke Sarakole of Ngalam) called it Colle and further along (again, Marmol assuming Senegal was connected to the Niger), the people of Bagamo' (Bambara of Bamako?) called it Zimbala (Jimbala?) and the people of Timbuktu called it the Yça.

== Etymology ==
The 16th-century chronicler João de Barros asserts the Portuguese renamed it "Senegal" because that was the personal name of a local Wolof chieftain who frequently conducted business with the Portuguese traders. But this etymology is doubtful (e.g. the ruler of Senegalese river state of Waalo bears the title 'Brak', and Cadamosto gives the personal name of the Senegal river chieftain as "Zucholin"). The confusion may have arisen because Cadamosto says the Portuguese interacted frequently with a certain Wolof chieftain south of the river, somewhere on the Grande Côte, which he refers to as Budomel. "Budomel" is almost certainly a reference to the ruler of Cayor, a combination of his formal title ("Damel"), prefixed by the generic Wolof term bor ("lord"). Curiously, Budomel is reminiscent of Vedamel already used by the Genoese back in the 14th century as an alternative name of the Senegal River. It is almost certain that the Genoese "Vedamel" are corruptions from the Arabic, either Wad al-mal ("River of Treasure", i.e. Gold) or, alternatively, Wad al-Melli ("River of Mali") or even, by transcription error, Wad al-Nill ("River of Nile").

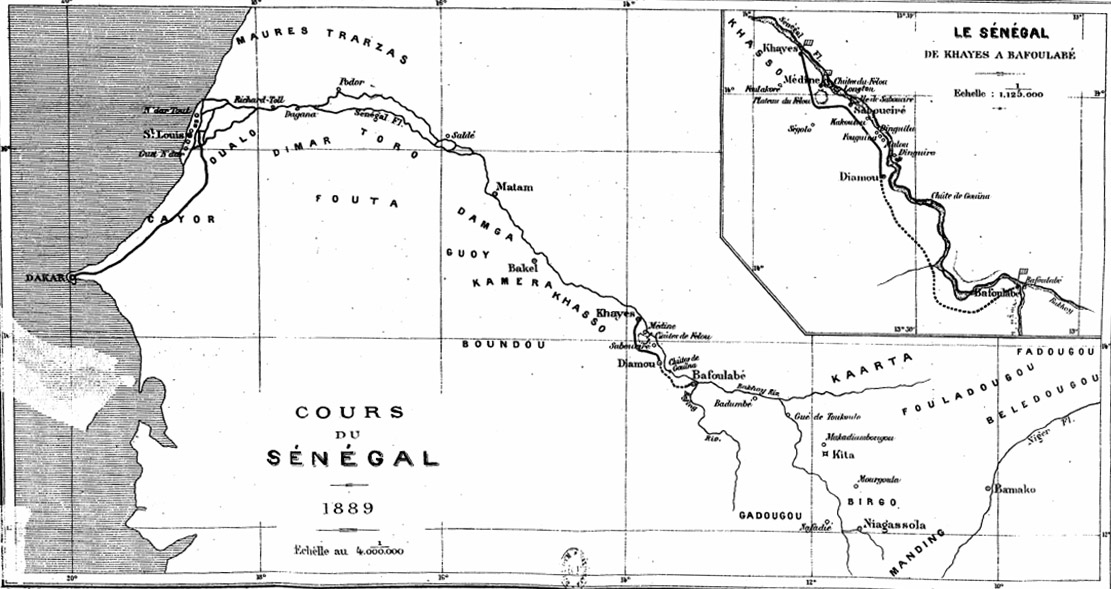
Route of the Senegal, map from 1889

Other etymological theories for "Senegal" abound. A popular one, first proposed by Fr. David Boilat (1853), was that "Senegal" comes from the Wolof phrase sunu gaal, meaning "our canoe" (more precisely, "our pirogue"). Bailot speculates the name probably arose as a misunderstanding, that when a Portuguese captain came across some Wolof fishermen and asked them what the name of the river was, they believed he was asking who their fishing boat belonged to, and replied simply "it is our canoe" (sunu gaal). The "our canoe" theory has been popularly embraced in modern Senegal for its charm and appeal to national solidarity ("we're all in one canoe", etc.).

More recent historians suggest the name "Senegal" is probably a derivation of Azenegue, the Portuguese term for the Saharan Berber Zenaga people that lived north of it.

A strong challenge to this theory is that "Senegal" is much older, and might derive from "Sanghana" (also given as Isenghan, Asengan, Singhanah), a city described by the Arab historian al-Bakri in 1068 as located by the mouth of the Senegal River (straddling both banks) and the capital of a local kingdom. The location Senegany is depicted in 1351 Genoese map known as the Medici Atlas (Laurentian Gaddiano portolan). This town ("Isingan") is fantastically depicted in the 1413 portolan map of Majorcan cartographer Mecia de Viladestes . The name itself might be of Berber Zenaga origin, speculatively related to 'Ismegh' ('black slave', analogous to the Arabic 'abd) or 'sagui nughal' ('border'). Some sources claim 'Isinghan' remained the usual Berber term to refer to the Wolof kingdom of Cayor.

Some Serer people from the south have advanced the claim that the river's name is originally derived from the compound of the Serer term "Sene" (from Rog Sene, Supreme Deity in Serer religion) and "O Gal" (meaning "body of water").

== Economic Importance ==
The Senegal River acts as a critical economic engine for West Africa, particularly for the four riparian countries it connects: Guinea, Mali, Mauritania, and Senegal. It's economic importance spans across a mix of traditional community livelihoods and modern industrial applications:

=== Hydropower generation ===
The river is a major source of electricity and energy security for the region. Current infrastructure includes the 1460 metres long Manantali Dam with an output capacity of 200MV, the Gouina Hydroelectric Plant (140MV) in Mali, and the Félou Hydroelectric Plant (62 MW). This energy production is heavily relied upon for modern economic development and there are significant planned expansions, including the Koukoutamba (294 MW), Boureya (161 MW), and Gourbassi (18 MW) hydroelectric plants.

== See also ==
- Futa Toro

== Sources ==
- Chisholm, Hugh, ed. (1911). "Senegal (river)" . Encyclopædia Britannica. Vol. 24 (11th ed.). Cambridge University Press. p. 639.
- João de Barros (1552–59) Décadas da Ásia: Dos feitos, que os Portuguezes fizeram no descubrimento, e conquista, dos mares, e terras do Oriente.. Vol. 1 (Dec I, Lib.1-5).
- Beazley, C.R. (1899) "Introduction" to vol. 2 of C.R. Beazley and E. Prestage, editors, Zurara's The Chronicle of the Discovery and Conquest of Guinea. London: Haklyut
- Boilat, Fr. David (1853). Esquisses sénégalaises: physionomie du pays, peuplades, commerce, religions, passé et avenir, récits et légendes' (in French). Paris: P. Bertrand.
- Alvise Cadamosto (1460s) "Il Libro di Messer Alvise Ca da Mosto Gentilhuomo Venetiano" & "Navigatione del Capitano Pietro di Sintra Portoghese scritta per il medesimo M. Alvise da Ca da Mosto", as printed in Venice (1550), by Giovanni Battista Ramusio, ed., Primo volume delle navigationi et viaggi nel qua si contine la descrittione dell'Africa, et del paese del Prete Ianni, on varii viaggi, dal mar Rosso a Calicut,& infin all'isole Molucche, dove nascono le Spetierie et la navigatione attorno il mondo.. online (English translation: "Original Journals of the Voyages of Cada Mosto and Piedro de Cintra to the Coast of Africa, the former in the years 1455 and 1456, and the latter soon afterwards", in R. Kerr, 1811, A General History of Voyages and Travels to the end of the 18th century, vol. 2, Edinburgh: Blackwood. online)
- Cooley, W. D. (1841). The Negroland of the Arabs examined and explained; or, An inquiry into the early history and geography of Central Africa. London: Arrowsmith.
- Delafosse, M. (1912) Haut-Sénégal-Niger. 3 vols, Paris: Emil Larose.
- Hrbek, I. (1992) Africa from the Seventh to the Eleventh century. University of California Press.
- Levtzion, N. (1973) Ancient Ghana and Mali London: Methuen
- Levtzion, N. and J.F.P. Hopkins, editors, (2000) Corpus of early Arabic sources for West African history, Princeton, NJ: Markus Wiener.
- Leo Africanus (1526) Descrittione dell' Africa, & delle cose notabili che lui sono, per Giovan Lioni Africano "Descrittione dell’Africa", as printed in Venice (1550), by Giovanni Battista Ramusio, ed., Primo volume delle navigationi et viaggi nel qua si contine la descrittione dell'Africa, et del paese del Prete Ianni, on varii viaggi, dal mar Rosso a Calicut,& infin all'isole Molucche, dove nascono le Spetierie et la navigatione attorno il mondo.. English trans. 1896, as The History and Description of Africa, and of the notable things therein contained. London: Haklyut. vol. 1
- Major, Richard Henry (1868). The Discoveries of Prince Henry the Navigator: and their results; being the narrative of the discovery by sea, within one century, of more than half the world (1877 ed.). London: S. Low, Marston, Searle, & Rivington.
- Luis de Marmol Carvajal (1573) Primera Parte de la Descripción General de Áffrica, con todos los successos de guerras que a auido entre los infieles, ye el pueblo Christiano, y entre ellos mesmos, desde que Mahoma inueto su secta, hasta el año del señor 1571. Granada: Rabut.
- Mauny, R. (1961). "Tableau géographique de l'ouest africain au moyen-âge d' après les sources écrites, la tradition et l'archéologie". Mémoire de l'Institut Fondamental d'Afrique Noire. 61. Dakar.
- McIntosh, Susan Keech (April 1981). "A Reconsideration of the Wangara/Palolus Island of Gold". Journal of African History. 22 (2): 145–158. doi:10.1017/S002185370001937X. ISSN 1469-5138. S2CID 162961695.
- Monteil, Vincent (1964). l'Islam Noir (in French). Paris: Edit. du Seuil. ISBN 978-2020024624.
- Monteil, Vincent (1968). "al-Bakri (Cordoue, 1068) - Routier de l'Afrique blanche et noire du Nord-Ouest: Traduction nouvelle de seize chapitres, sur le MS arabe 17 Bd PSS/902 du British Museum". Bulletin de l'Ifan. 30: 39–116.
- A Phérotée de La Croix (1688) Relation universelle de l'Afrique, ancienne et moderne Alyon: Amaulry
- Pliny the Elder (c. 30 AD) Naturalis Historiae. [1855 edition, John Bostock and Henry Thomas Riley transl. The Natural History of Pliny. London: H.G. Bohn. vol 1. (Bks I - V)
- Russell, P. E. (2000). Prince Henry 'the Navigator': a life. New Haven, Conn: Yale University Press. ISBN 9780300091304.
- Livio Sanuto (1588) Geografia di M. Livio Sanvto distinta in XII libri. Ne' quali, oltra l'esplicatione di molti luoghi di Tolomeo e della Bussola, e dell' Aguglia; si dichiarano le Provincie, Popoli, Regni, Città; Porti, Monti, Fiumi, Laghi, e Costumi dell' Africa. Con XII tavole di essa Africa in dissegno di rame. Aggiuntivi de piu tre Indici da M. Giovan Carlo Saraceni, Venice: Damiano Zenaro.
- Winter, Heinrich (January 1962). "The Fra Mauro Portolan chart in the Vatican". Imago Mundi. 16 (1): 17–28. doi:10.1080/03085696208592198. ISSN 0308-5694. JSTOR 1150299.
- Gomes Eanes de Zurara (1453) Crónica dos feitos notáveis que se passaram na Conquista da Guiné por mandado do Infante D. Henrique or Chronica do descobrimento e conquista da Guiné. [Trans. 1896-99 by C.R. Beazley and E. Prestage, The Chronicle of the Discovery and Conquest of Guinea, London: Haklyut, v.1, v.2
- Villalón, Leonardo A. (2006). Islamic Society and State Power in Senegal: Disciples and Citizens in Fatick. Cambridge University Press. pp. 54–55. ISBN 978-0-521-03232-2., Quote: "Serer oral tradition recounts the group's origins in the Senegal River valley, where it was part of, or closely related to, the same group as the ancestors of today's Tukulor."
- Galvan, Dennis Charles, The State Must Be Our Master of Fire: How Peasants Craft Culturally Sustainable Development in Senegal, Berkeley: University of California Press, 2004, p. 5
- Berg, Elizabeth; Wan, Ruth; and Lau, Ruth (2009). Senegal. Marshall Cavendish. ISBN 9780761444817, p. 63
- Page, Willie F., Encyclopedia of African history and culture: African kingdoms (500 to 1500), pp. 209, 676. Vol.2, Facts on File (2001), ISBN 0-8160-4472-4
- Streissguth, Thomas, "Senegal in Pictures, Visual Geography", Second Series, p. 23, Twenty-First Century Books (2009), ISBN 1-57505-951-7
- Oliver, Roland Anthony; & Fage, J. D.; "Journal of African history", Volume 10, p. 367. Cambridge University Press (1969)
- Mwakikagile, Godfrey, "Ethnic Diversity and Integration in The Gambia: The Land, The People and The Culture," (2010), p. 11, ISBN 9987-9322-2-3
