= Karakoro River =

River in Africa

Coordinates: 14°43′20″N 12°03′14″W

The Karakoro River (French: Rivière Karakoro) is a small seasonal tributary of the Sénégal River that forms part of the Mali–Mauritania border. The source of the river is northeast of Kiffa in Mauritania. The river flows south in the flat Sahel region of southern Mauritania, crossing a number of shallow depressions, before joining the Sénégal River on the left bank a few kilometres downstream of the small Malian town of Ambidedi.
