= Mecia de Viladestes =

Jewish cartographer of Majorca

Mecia de Viladestes, also known as Mecià or Macià de Viladestes, was a 15th century Jewish cartographer, one of the Mallorcan school of cartography. The name Mecia is a variant of Matias or Matthew. His birth name was Samuel Corchos. In 1401, he was conveyed to Sicily under license from the governor of Mallorca, presumably one of the Jews forcibly converted to Christianity around this time.

1413 Portolan chart by Mecia de Viladestes

He is mostly known for his 1413 portolan chart which shows the N.E Atlantic Ocean, the Mediterranean Sea, the Black Sea, the Red Sea, and parts of the Caspian Sea, the Persian Gulf and the Baltic Sea. The map, which measures 1.21 X 0.87m, was discovered by Joaquín Lorenzo Villanueva in the archives of the Carthusian monastery of the Val de Cristo, near the town of Segorbe in Spain. It bears the inscription in gold letters MECIA DE VILA DESTIS ME FECIT IN ANO MCCCCXIII - Mecia de Viladestes made me in the year 1413. A complete reproduction of the map was first published in 1896. The map is now in the National Library of France.

The map is notable as one of the first to show detail of Africa south of the Atlas Mountains. This includes factual material, such as Mali with Timbuktu and an image of its 14th Century King Mussa Melli; as well as conjectural material, such as Prester John, shown in Ethiopia. The north Atlantic shows a whaling ship, and Great Britain is shown without the distortion or "turning" of Scotland that is found in later maps, after Ptolemy's Geography became available in Latin translation. The border between England and Scotland is very stylized, with mountains and two castles (probably Carlisle and Edinburgh) shown at right angles to the border, and rivers running east and west from the mountains. This convention may have led to later portolan charts showing England and Scotland as separate islands.

Details from the 1413 chart
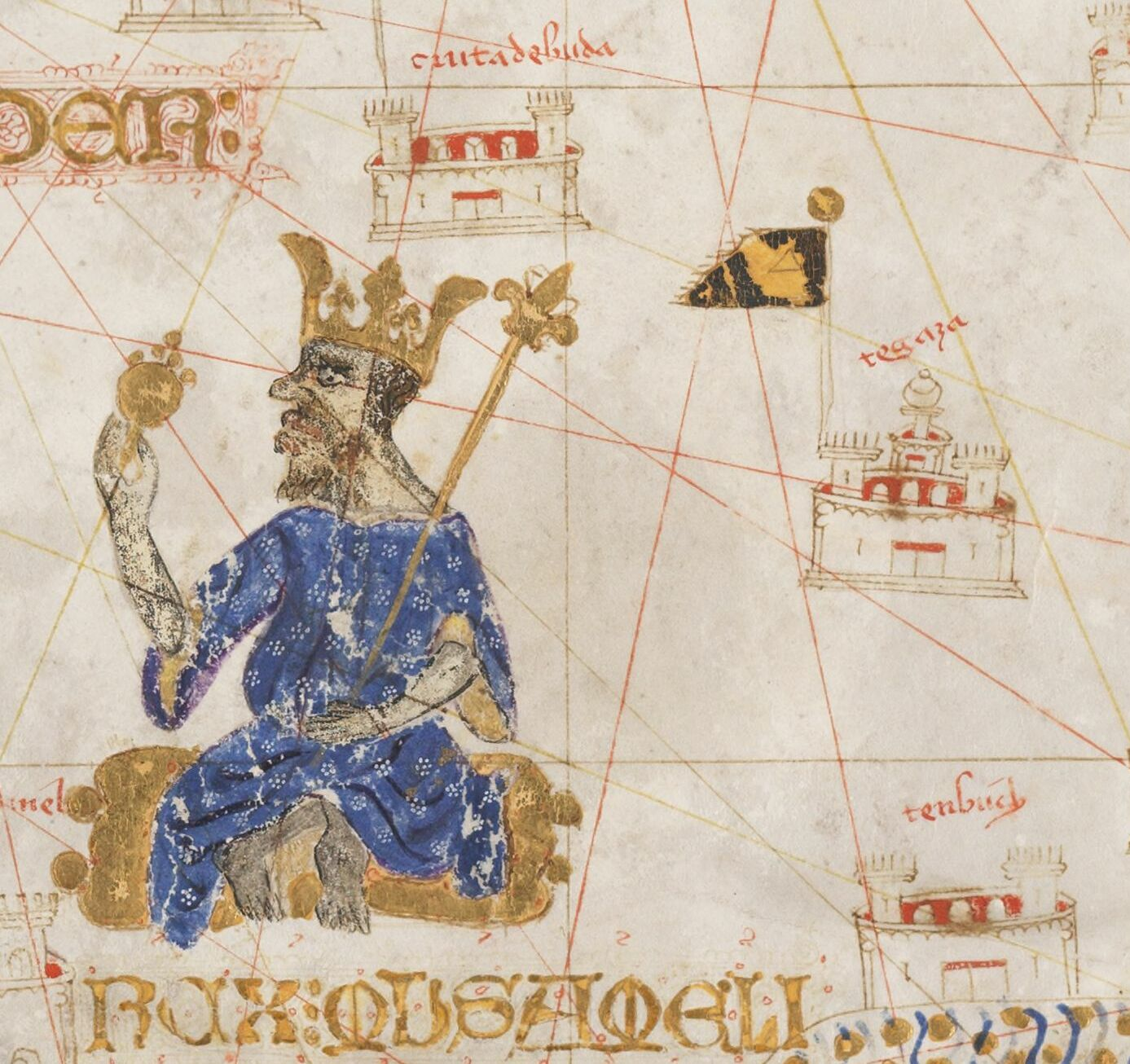
Mussa Melli and Timbuktu

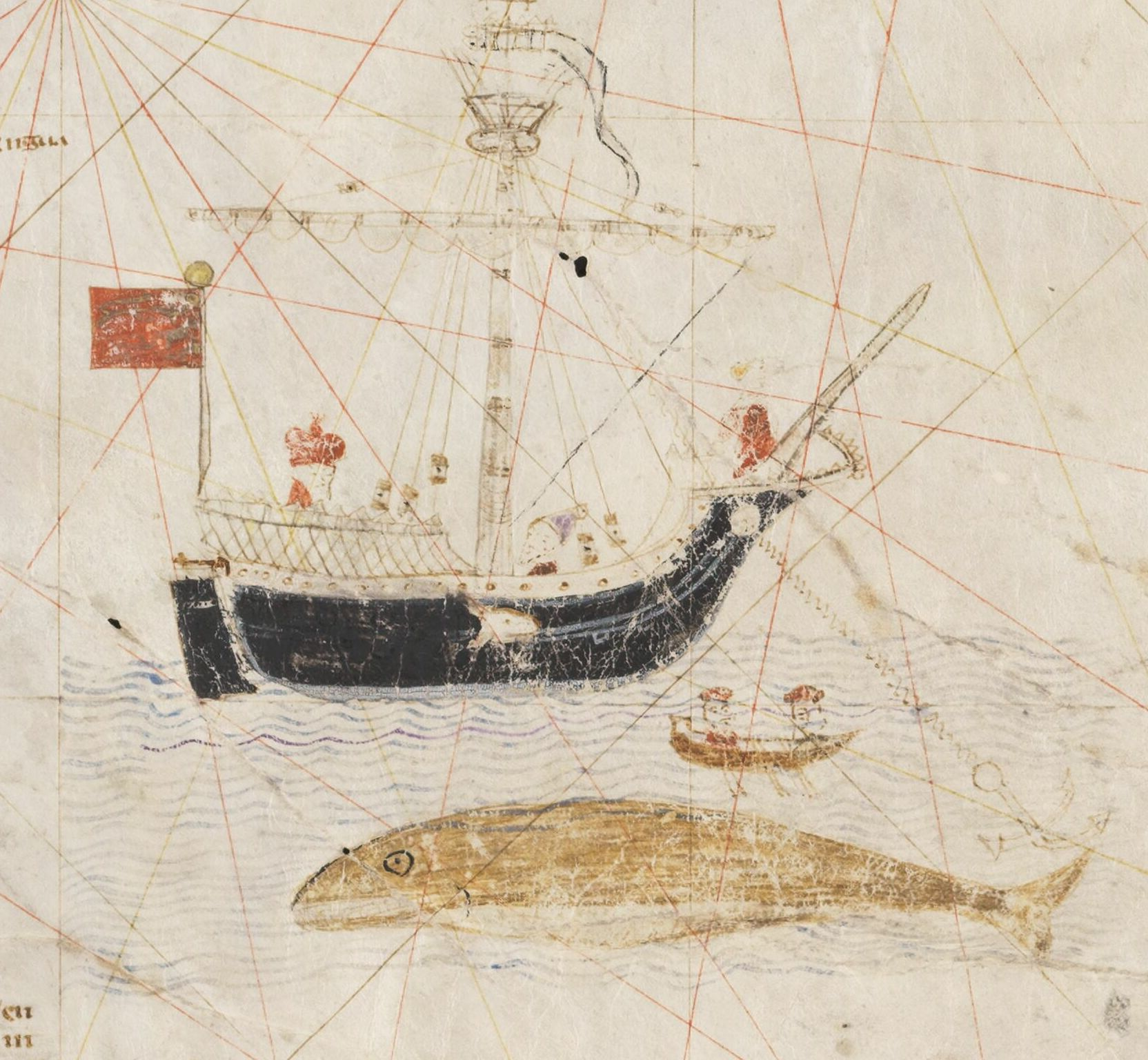
Whaling in the north Atlantic

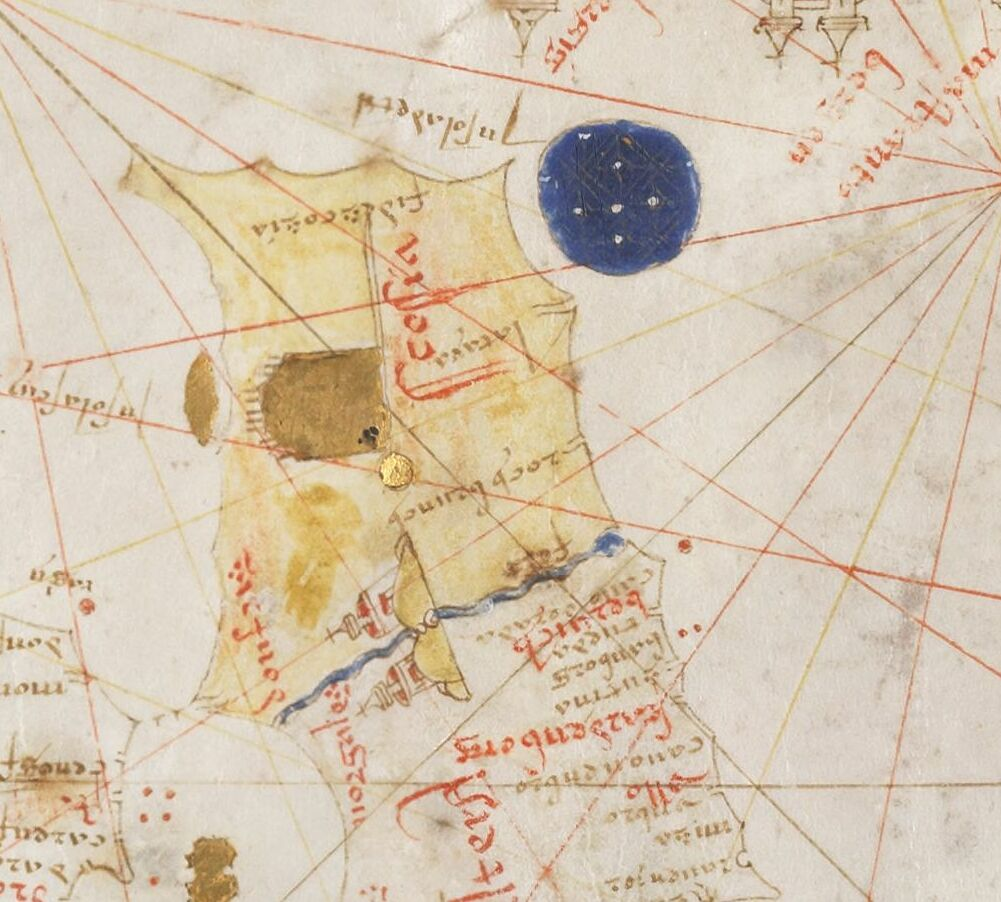
Scotland and northern England
