= Theon Ochema =

Theon Ochema (θεῶν ὄχημα) is an ancient Greek toponym for a place in West Africa. The name means "Chariot (or Support) of the Gods".

The name comes from the Greek version of the periplus of the Carthaginian explorer Hanno the Navigator, whence it was picked up by Pliny the Elder for his Natural History. The word ochema is not otherwise used in placenames and Duane Roller surmises that it was a local name translated into Punic and from there into Greek. Pliny also made use of a lost account of the African exploration of Polybius. According to Hanno, Theon Ochema was an active volcano four days' sailing past the Horn of the West. Pliny gives the distance as ten days, which he may have taken from Polybius. He lists Theon Ochema as the largest volcano in Aethiopia.

Theon Ochema has often been identified with Mount Cameroon, which is the only active volcano on the northwestern coast of Africa. The suggestion was first made by Richard Burton in an account of his ascent of the mountain in 1862. The latitude given for Theon Ochema by Ptolemy in his Geography closesly matches that of Mount Cameroon. An alternative identification is with Mount Kakulima in Guinea.
