= Organisation pour la mise en valeur du fleuve Sénégal =

Organisation in Dakar, Senegal

The Organisation pour la mise en valeur du fleuve Sénégal (OMVS; in English Senegal River Basin Development Authority) is an organisation grouping Guinea, Mali, Mauritania and Senegal for the purpose of jointly managing the Senegal River and its drainage basin. It was founded in 1972.

A predecessor organisation, the Organisation des Etats Riverians du Fleuve Sénégal (or Senegal River Riparian States Organisation), with the four border countries—Guinea, Mali, Mauritania, and Senegal—was established to manage the Sénégal River drainage basin and the river itself. This organisation dissolved when Guinea withdrew due to political tensions, and the three remaining countries subsequently created the OMVS. Guinea returned to the organisation in 2005.

The OMVS aims to promote food security and self-sufficiency, to improve the income of local populations, and to preserve natural ecosystems. The area has a total population of 35 million inhabitants, of whom 12 million live in the river basin and where malaria control intervention coverage is among the lowest in the world.

OMVS has received a high score in a global comparison of indicators of water cooperation prepared by Strategic Foresight Group, an India-based international think tank that focuses on global issues. OMVS has a score of 91 in the Water Cooperation Quotient, which examines active cooperation by riparian countries in the management of water resources using 10 parameters, including legal, political, technical, environmental, economic and institutional aspects. The Quotient is calculated on a scale of 0 to 100, with 100 being the best performance. High performance in the Water Cooperation Quotient also means low risk of war between countries in the concerned river basin.
