= Nara Region =

Nara
- Region
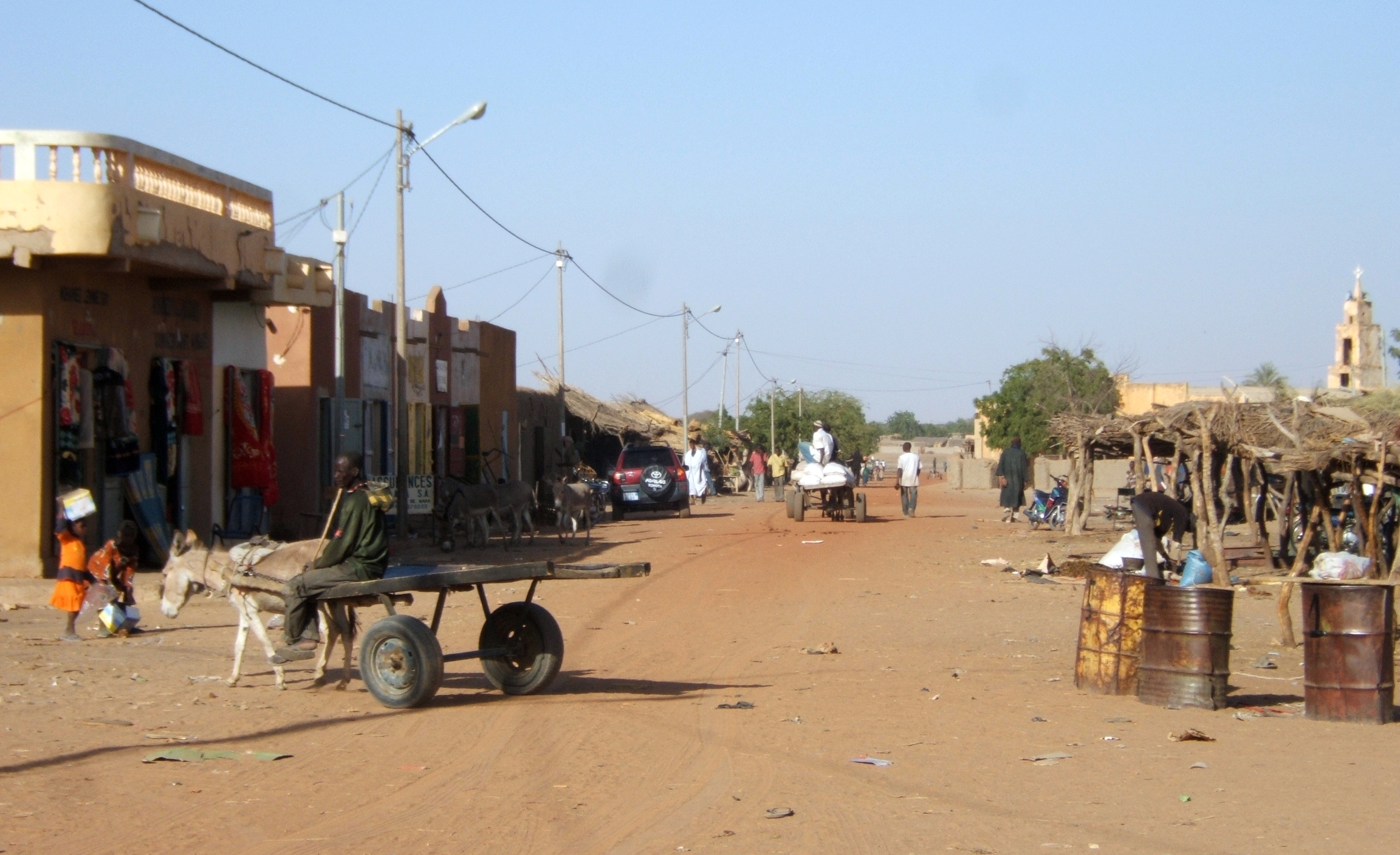
- Street in Nara

- Coordinates: 15.168461°N 7.290154°W
- Country: Mali
- Capital: Nara

Area
  - Total: 31,250 km^{2} (12,070 sq mi)

Population (2023)
  - Total: 303,584
  - Density: 9.715/km^{2} (25.16/sq mi)

Nara Region is an administrative region of Mali that was created from the division of Koulikoro Region in 2023. Its capital is the town of Nara.

== Geography ==
The region is located in the south-west of the country and covers an area of 31,250 km², corresponding to 2.5% of the national territory. Nara Region borders three Malian regions (Nioro, Koulikoro, Ségou) and Mauritania to the north. Its relief consists of an extensive sandy plain with a Sahelian climate and annual rainfall between 200 and 600 mm. Most of the region lies within the drainage basin of the Senegal River. There are no permanent watercourses in the region, but there are many ponds. These store rainwater for between three and ten months and are used for watering livestock, vegetable cultivation and traditional fish farming.

== History ==
Nara Cercle belonged to Koulikoro Region until 2023. Its elevation to a separate region had already been decided in 2012, but due to the poor security situation in the country and political factors, it could only be implemented in 2023 through the adoption of Law No. 2023-006.

== Administrative divisions ==
The region is divided into six cercles.

Cercle code	Cercle	Communes
1401	Nara	3
1402	Ballé	3
1403	Dilly	2
1404	Mourdiah	2
1405	Guiré	2
1406	Fallou	2

== Population ==
In 2023, the population was estimated at 303,584, based on the census carried out the previous year. The Nara Region is the fourth least populated region in Mali, with around 307,777 inhabitants in 2022.

With a total fertility rate at 5.7 births per woman, Nara has a slightly lower TFR than the Malian national average of 6.1 births per woman.

Year	Population
1998	166,783
2009	241,904
2023	303,584

=== Ethnicity ===
Ethnicity in Nara (2022)
1. Soninke (41.4%)
2. Fula (21.0%)
3. Bambara (19.9%)
4. Arabs (14.8%)
5. Malinké (1.14%)
6. Other (1.70%)

The Nara Region is ethnically diverse, with Mandé peoples accounting for just under two-thirds of the population. Nara is one of three Malian regions, the others being Kayes and Nioro, where the Soninke people represent the single largest ethnic group. The Fula, Bambara, Arabs (Maure), and Malinké also have a significant presence in the region.

Mother tongues in Nara region (2022 census)
1. Maraka / Soninké (42.11%)
2. Fula (20.54%)
3. Bambara (19.88%)
4. Maure (15.55%)
5. Other Malian (1.85%)
6. Other African (0.06%)
7. Other foreign (0.01%)

=== Religion ===
The 2022 census found that 99.65% of the population in Nara was Muslim, 0.19% was Christian, 0.15% identified with traditional faiths, and 0.01% had no religion. Islam is the dominant religion among all of Nara's main ethnic groups, with the Soninke, Fula, Arab, and Malinké peoples being almost entirely Muslim.
