= Mourdiah attack =

2024 attack in Mourdiah, Mali

- Part of the Mali War
Date	26 May 2024
Location	Mourdiah and Niamana, Mali
Result	Malian-Wagner victory

Belligerents
Mali; Wagner Group	Jama'at Nasr al-Islam wal Muslimin

Casualties and losses
5 killed Several dozen wounded	31+ killed (per video in Niamana); 100+ killed (per Mali)

On 26 May 2024, Jama'at Nasr al-Islam wal Muslimin (JNIM) jihadists attacked a Malian Army and Wagner Group base in Mourdiah, Koulikoro Region, Mali. The attack was repelled, and dozens of jihadists were killed.

== Background ==
Jama'at Nasr al-Islam wal Muslimin, al-Qaeda's affiliate in Mali, Burkina Faso, and Niger, has had a presence in the Wagadou Forest on the Malian-Mauritanian border since the late 2000s. The group has attacked Malian forces in towns and bases surrounding the forest throughout the Mali War and before, with a notable attack in the district capital of Nara in 2015. Since late 2023 and into early 2024, JNIM has intensified its attacks on Malian forces on areas surrounding the forest, mainly attempting to cut off communication along National Road 4. In February 2024, JNIM fighters attacked a Malian base at Kwala, near Mourdiah, killing around thirty Malian soldiers and briefly occupying the base.

== Attack ==
JNIM attacked the camp in Mourdiah at dawn on 26 May, with two vehicles carrying suicide bombers targeting the entrance of the base and artillery fire backing them up. Malian and Wagner forces were able to repel the attackers, who fled. Malian troops set out in pursuit of the jihadists, flying airplanes and drones overhead and launching some drone strikes. Many of the jihadists were caught in Niamana, a village that was the scene of a massacre by Malian and Wagner forces who killed 13 civilians.

While JNIM did not publish a statement claiming responsibility for the attack, French journalist Wassim Nasr stated that JNIM had conducted the attack and acknowledged the loss. Malian officials stated five men were killed in the attack and several dozen were wounded, and stated that at least a hundred jihadists had been killed. A video taken in Niamana showed at least thirty-one corpses of jihadists, several of whom were entirely disemboweled, had their genitals cut off, or decapitated. This practice is more common in Wagner mercenaries than Malian forces.
