= Kwala attack =

2024 attack in Koulikoro Region, Mali

- Part of Mali War
Date	February 28, 2024
Location	Kwala, Koulikoro Region, Mali
Result	JNIM victory

Belligerents
Mali	Jama'at Nasr al-Islam wal Muslimin

Strength
Unknown	100+ fighters

Casualties and losses
30–32 killed (per RFI and JNIM); Several dozen wounded (per RFI); 2 hostages	Unknown

On February 28, 2024, jihadists from Jama'at Nasr al-Islam wal Muslimin attacked the Malian military camp in Kwala, a village near Mourdiah, Mali. The attack was the first suicide car bombing by the group since 2022, and was part of a campaign by JNIM to expand influence in Koulikoro Region. Over thirty Malian soldiers were killed in the attack.

== Background ==
Jama'at Nasr al-Islam wal Muslimin, al-Qaeda's affiliate in Mali, Burkina Faso, and Niger, has had a presence in the Wagadou Forest on the Malian-Mauritanian border since the late 2000s. The group has attacked Malian forces in towns and bases surrounding the forest throughout the Mali War and before, with a notable attack in the district capital of Nara in 2015. Since late 2023, JNIM has intensified its attacks on Malian forces on areas surrounding the forest, mainly attempting to cut off communication along National Road 4. In October 2023, the group claimed to have captured a Malian and Wagner Group base on the road, and JNIM launched suicide bombers on motorcycles on Malian and Wagner forces on the road in December 2023.

== Attack ==
The attack began early on the morning of February 28 with a suicide bomber in a car exploding at the entrance to the Malian base. Over a hundred jihadists raided the base after the bombing, seizing the camp and overrunning the Malian forces stationed there. JNIM looted weapons, ammunition, and equipment, destroying what they couldn't take away. Malian forces regained control of the base after the jihadists had abandoned it.

Malian officials confirmed the attack in a press release that same day, and stated that Malian forces set out in pursuit of the jihadists and that JNIM bases were located and destroyed near Fallou. AFP stated that due to the remoteness of the area around Kwala, details by JNIM and Malian officials were difficult to independently corroborate.

== Aftermath ==
The suicide vehicle bombing utilized by JNIM in the attack was the first of its kind in the country since July 2022. The attack as a whole was a continuation of JNIM's campaign to expand influence in Koulikoro Region and break down Malian presence on National Road 4.

The Malian army did not report any casualties from the attack, with AFP noting that Malian officials no longer report casualties in attacks any more. RFI, citing local medical and civilian sources, stated that between thirty and thirty-two Malian soldiers were killed. Several dozen soldiers were wounded or missing as well. JNIM corroborated these numbers, stating that over thirty Malian soldiers were killed. On March 4, JNIM released images of two Malian prisoners of war.
