= Goumbou =

- Town
- Location in Mali
- Coordinates: 14°59′27″N 7°27′14″W
- Country: Mali
- Region: Koulikoro Region
- Cercle: Nara Cercle
- Commune: Ouagadou
- Elevation: 269 m (883 ft)
- Time zone: UTC+0 (GMT)

Goumbou is a small town and seat of the commune of Ouagadou in the Cercle of Nara in the Koulikoro Region of south-western Mali. The town is 28 km southwest of Nara, the administrative centre of the cercle on the Route Nationale 4 that connects Nara and the Malian capital, Bamako.

== Sister city ==
- Vegas del Genil, Spain
