= Marena (disambiguation) =

Marena is a village in the municipality of Kavadarci, North Macedonia.

Marena or MARENA may also refer to:

== Places ==
- Marena, Yélimané, a village in Cercle of Yélimané, Kayes Region, Mali
- Maréna Diombougou, often simply Maréna, a village in Cercle of Kayes, Kayes Region, Mali
- Marena Township, Hodgeman County, Kansas, United States

== People ==
- Erika Marena (born 1975), Brazilian chief of police
- Jordi Mareñá (born 1991), Spanish footballer

== Other uses ==
- Ministry of the Environment and Natural Resources (Nicaragua)
