= Phukan =

Phukan or Phukån refers to a title used for certain officials or notable figures in Ahom Kingdom which is currently used as the surname by the descendants.

== Etymology ==
It's a combination of two words of Tai-Ahom language.

== Variants of Phukan ==
Various types of Phukan indicate their role, place, or association are:

1. Phukån Khāri (Phukān of gun powders)
2. Phukån Khuāng (Phukān of Khuāng, dibrugarh)
3. Phukån Khe (Phukān having the charge of fishing net)
4. Phukân Tunrungdām – Phukān appointed in present day Kaliabar)
5. Phukån Phākut (Phukān of the fern)
6. Phukån Phushānngin (Phukān who handles judicial matters).
7. Phukån Bāo (Phukān of the youth)
8. Phukån Bāilung (Phukān of the Bailung clan)
9. Phukån Māmu (Phukān of the nut)
10. Phukån Moshāi (Phukān of the Moshāi clan)
11. Phukån Mau (The new Phukān)
12. Phukån Yāmshu (Phukān of the coat)
13. Phukån Ru (Phukān of the boat)
14. Phukån Rāidāng (Phukān of Rāidāng)
15. Phukån Lung – (Phukān of the greatness)

== Notable people ==
- Anandaram Dhekial Phukan (1829–1859), one of the pioneers of Assamese literature in the Arunodoi era
- Anup Phukan, Indian politician
- Babul Phukan (1968–2013), former Indian footballer from Assam
- Bhrigu Phukan, leader of Asom Gana Parishad and a cabinet minister in Government of Assam
- Biju Phukan (1947–2017), senior Assamese cine-actor of great fame
- Biswajit Phukan, politician
- Chiring Phukan, an official of the state of Ahom in medieval Assam
- Dhrubajyoti Phukan, film score composer
- Mahendra Nath Deka Phukan (1903–1974), artist, poet, journalist and craftsman of Assam
- Mitra Phukan, Indian author who writes in English
- Nilmani Phookan Jr, Assamese poet
- Nilmoni Phukan Sr (1880–1978), Assamese poet and freedom fighter
- Pranati Phukan (born 1963), former minister, deputy speaker and member of Assam Legislative Assembly
- Prasanta Phukan (born 1954), Bharatiya Janata Party politician from Assam
- Sailendu Nath Phukan (1937–2018), Indian judge of the Supreme Court of India
- Siddhartha Phukan, SULFA leader
- Suresh Phukan, singer, lyricist, music composer, writer, poet, actor, director, social activist and professor
- Tarun Ram Phukan (1877–1939), orator, writer and Assamese politician

== See also ==
- Piyoli Phukan, black & white Assamese language film released in 1955
