= Guénéibe =

- Commune and village
- Location in Mali
- Coordinates: 15°16′55″N 7°5′10″W
- Country: Mali
- Region: Koulikoro Region
- Cercle: Nara Cercle

Area
  - Total: 2,925 km^{2} (1,129 sq mi)

Population (2009 census)
  - Total: 7,668
  - Density: 2.622/km^{2} (6.790/sq mi)
- Time zone: UTC+0 (GMT)

Guénéibe is a village and rural commune in the Cercle of Nara in the Koulikoro Region of south-western Mali. The village is 25 km northeast of Nara, the administrative centre of the cercle.

The commune has an area of 2,925 km^{2} and contains 18 villages. In the 2009 census it had a population of 7,668. It is bordered to the north by the frontier with the Republic of Mauritania, to the southeast by the commune of Guiré and to the west by the commune of Nara.

The commune has a sahelian climate with an annual rainfall of around 400 mm.
