= Bouhlal =

Bouhlal (Arabic: بوهلال) is an Arabic surname especially occurring in Morocco. Notable people with the surname include:

- Mouhcine Bouhlal (1970–2025), Moroccan footballer
- Rachad Bouhlal (born 1951), Moroccan diplomat
- Siham Bouhlal (born 1966), Moroccan-French poet and translator

== See also ==
- Boulal, a village in south-western Mali
