= 2016 Nampala attack =

Battle of the Mali War

Coordinates: 15.2792°N 5.4297°W

- Part of the Mali War
Date	19 July 2016
Location	Nampala, Ségou Region, Mali
Result	Jihadist victory

Belligerents
Mali	Katiba Macina; ANSIPRJ

Commanders and leaders
	Abou Yehiya

Strength
Unknown	Unknown

Casualties and losses
17 killed 35 wounded	3 wounded (ANSIPRJ claim)

The 2016 Nampala attack was an armed assault against a Malian Army base in the Niono Cercle subdivision of the Ségou Region of Mali on 19 July 2016, that left at least 17 government soldiers dead and 35 others injured. The Katiba Macina, al-Qaeda in the Islamic Maghreb and the ethnic Fula (or Fulani) militant group National Alliance for the Protection of Fulani Identity and the Restoration of Justice (ANSIPRJ) claimed joint responsibility.

== Background ==
Following the 2011 Libyan Civil War, Tuaregs fighting in the Libyan Arab Republic's Libyan Army fled to northern Mali with large stockpiles of heavy weapons. The ensuing insurgency quickly led to the Azawadi declaration of independence and consequent armed Islamist insurgency by MOJWA and Ansar Dine against the secular MNLA. This led to Operation Serval being launched by France in January 2013, followed by Operation Barkhane in 2014 once major fighting was over.

The country remained in a fragile state even after the French intervention, with militants attacking staging attacks in the capital Bamako as well as in Kidal during March 2015. In November of that same year a co-ordinated attack against the Radisson Blu hotel in Bamako resulted in more than 20 casualties, most of them hostages. A week later militants attacked a MINUSMA base in Kidal, killing 3 and injuring dozens.

Attacks continued at a steady pace during 2016. Militants attacked and briefly captured a MINUSMA police base in Timbuktu on 5 February, killing a high-ranking Malian commander, while suffering four casualties themselves. On 11 February suspected Islamist militants attacked a customs post in the town of Mopti, central Mali, killing two civilians and a customs officer. A truck bombing at a MINUSMA base in Kidal killed at least 5 UN peacekeepers and injured more than 30 others on 12 February. Gunmen attacked a military checkpoint in Léré on 24 February, killing at least three soldiers and wounding two others. On 12 April three French soldiers were killed and another was wounded when a bomb exploded under their vehicle near Tessalit. MINUSMA suffered two major attacks during May - five Chadian peacekeepers were killed and three others wounded in an ambush near Aguelhok on the 18th, while five Togolese soldiers were killed and another was injured in a similar attack near Sévaré on the 29th. On 1 June four UN mission staff were killed in two separate mortar attacks near Gao, including a Chinese peacekeeper, as well as a French expert and two local security guards. Two Malian soldiers were killed in an attack near Dinangourou on 10 July, while the deputy mayor of the Ouro Modi commune was shot on the following day in Mopti.

== Attack ==
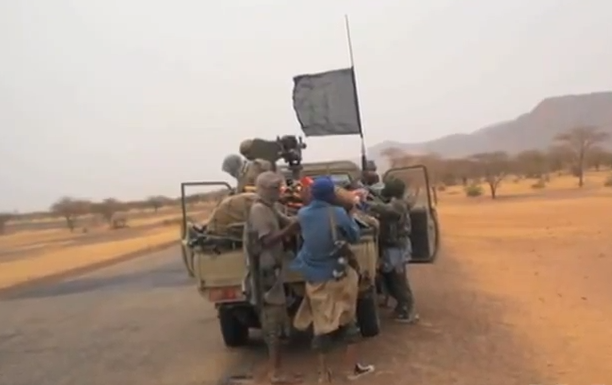
Islamist fighters in northern Mali

The attack took place in the early hours of 19 July 2016, at a Malian Army camp near the town of Nampala, in the rural commune of Nampalari near the border with Mauritania, about 500 km northeast of the capital Bamako. A group of heavily armed men reportedly overran the base, and set parts of it on fire, as Malian troops retreated to nearby Diabaly in order to regroup, according to Army spokesman Souleymane Maiga. The attackers also partially burned and looted the nearby town of Nampala, before fleeing.

A group called Katiba Macina, reportedly linked to Ansar Dine, initially claimed responsibility for the attack on social media. The same group had previously claimed several attacks on the army during 2015. Later a representative of ANSIPRJ contacted The Associated Press and claimed they had carried out the attack in response to attacks by government forces against Fula civilians. The group's spokesman Oumar Aldjana claimed they had gained possession of several trucks and stockpiles of ammunition, and that only three of the militants had been wounded during the assault.

Malian Army spokesman Maiga later confirmed that three groups had staged the coordinated attack, with al-Qaeda in the Islamic Maghreb attacking from the north, the Katiba waited in ambush outside town, and the ethnic Fula group joining from the southeast.

== Reactions ==
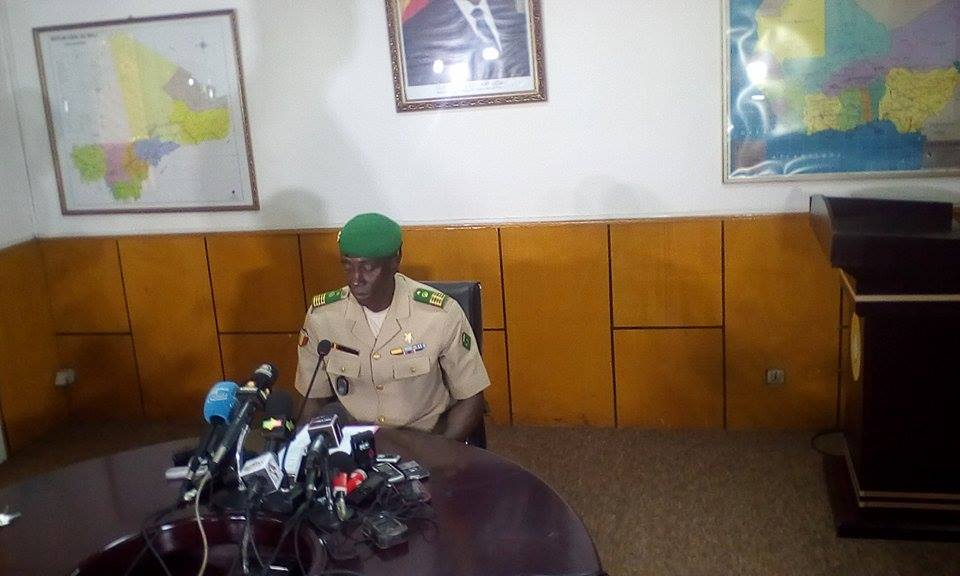
Malian Ministry of Defense spokesman, Colonel Abdoulaye Sidibé, briefs the press on a report about the attack.

In the immediate aftermath of the attack, President Ibrahim Boubacar Keïta called a security meeting together with the country's Prime Minister Modibo Keita and the commanders of the Armed Forces.

Defence Minister Tièman Hubert Coulibaly later appeared on state television to confirm the death toll, saying that the armed forces will "make sure that this coordinated terrorist attack ... is met with an appropriate response".

On 20 July the government declared a three-day period of mourning for the 17 soldiers killed and extended a state of emergency for 10 days across the entire country.

== See also ==
- 2015 Bamako hotel attack, an attack against a Radisson Blu hotel in Bamako in which MLF and AQIM co-ordinated with Al-Mourabitoun.
- November 2015 Kidal attack, an assault against a MINUSMA base carried out by Ansar Dine.
