= 2015 Kidal attack =

2015 Kidal attack may refer to one of two deadly attacks in Kidal, Mali, in 2015:

- March 2015 Kidal attack
- November 2015 Kidal attack
