= Mali–Mauritania relations =

- Mali: Mauritania

Mali–Mauritania relations are the bilateral diplomatic relations between Mali and Mauritania. Both countries are located in West Africa and the Sahel region, and share a 2,236 km-long border.

The two countries have historically been closely connected through trade and nomadic cultures. Today, they maintain cooperation in areas such as security, border management, and economic development. Both countries are also members of international organizations including the African Union, the Arab Maghreb Union, and the Organisation of Islamic Cooperation.

== History ==
In 1940, during the colonial period, part of the border between Mauritania and the French Sudan was drawn at the Kolimbine River in an effort to control raids and internecine conflicts involving the Moorish population. In 1961, the newly independent Republic of Mali demanded a change, seeking to incorporate the mostly Soninke population of western Diafounou into the state. After negotiation, the border was redrawn. Mali gained land west of the Kolimbine (traditionally parts of Diafounou and Guidimakha) up to the confluence with the Terekolle River.

Since the resolution of the boundary dispute in 1963, ties between the two countries have been mostly cordial. Mali and Mauritania have cooperated on several development projects, such as the OMVS and a plan to improve roads between Nouakchott and Bamako. This cooperation somewhat lessened Mali's dependence on Senegal and Côte d'Ivoire. Although relations were warm with other African states, since 1965 the orientation of Mauritania's foreign policy has been geared towards relations with North African countries.

=== Border crisis ===
Mauritanian and Malian relations arose in 2010, when French and Mauritanian forces launched a joint military operation against AQIM fighters believed to be holding a French hostage on Malian soil without the consent of the Malian government. The operation was a failure and left 7 AQIM members and 2 Mauritanian soldiers dead, with the hostage being executed. The operation was heavily criticized with it being considered to be an "unannounced declaration of war" against Mali.
