= Takaba =

- Village
- Location in Mali
- Coordinates: 15°2′18″N 10°28′43″W
- Country: Mali
- Region: Kayes Region
- Cercle: Yélimané Cercle
- Commune: Soumpou
- Time zone: UTC+0 (GMT)

Takaba is a village and principal settlement of the commune of Soumpou in the Cercle of Yélimané in the Kayes Region of south-western Mali.
