= Tringa, Mali =

Tringa
- Commune
- Location in Mali
- Coordinates: 14°38′49″N 10°45′4″W
- Country: Mali
- Region: Kayes Region
- Cercle: Yélimané Cercle

Population (2009 census)
  - Total: 12,509
- Time zone: UTC+0 (GMT)

Tringa is a commune in the Cercle of Yélimané in the Kayes Region of south-western Mali. The commune contains the four villages: Diakoné, Dialaka, Lambatara and Maréna. The administrative centre (chef-lieu) is Maréna. In 2009 the commune had a population of 12,509.

Sometimes spelled Tiringa, the area was historically a Soninke dyamare (chiefdom or confederacy) beginning in the period of the Wagadu Empire. It is mentioned by al-Bakri as a country on the road between Galambu and the capital and a major producer of cotton. Tiringa was among the first areas conquered by the Bathily dynasty as they established the kingdom of Gajaaga, but regained its independence during a succession crisis. The name 'Tiringa' means 'country of the elephants', and it in fact exported significant quantities of ivory in the 17th century.

Tiringa became a canton under the French colonial regime, then an arrondissement after independence, then a commune in the early 1990s.
