= Mali–Mauritania border =

International border

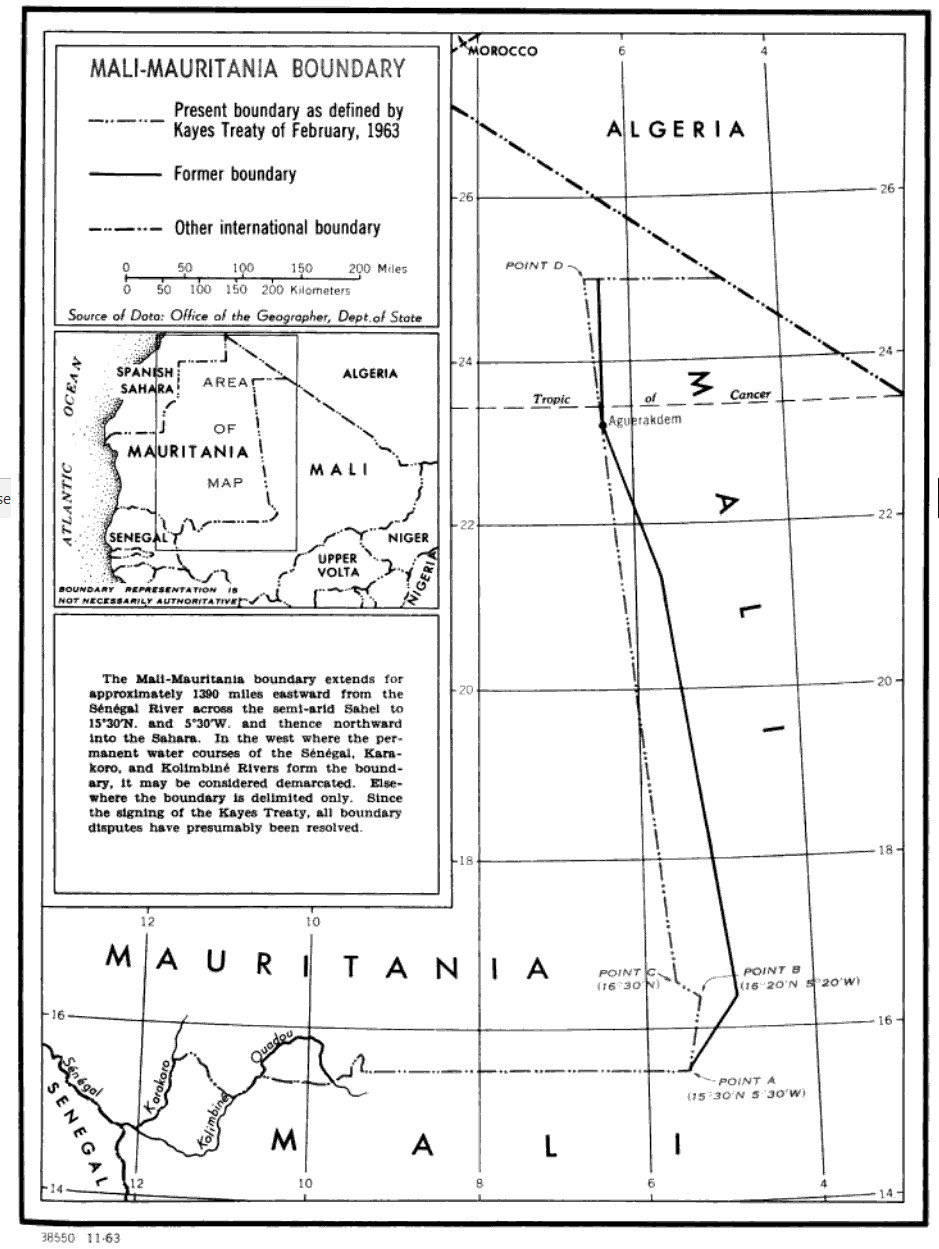
Map of the entire border

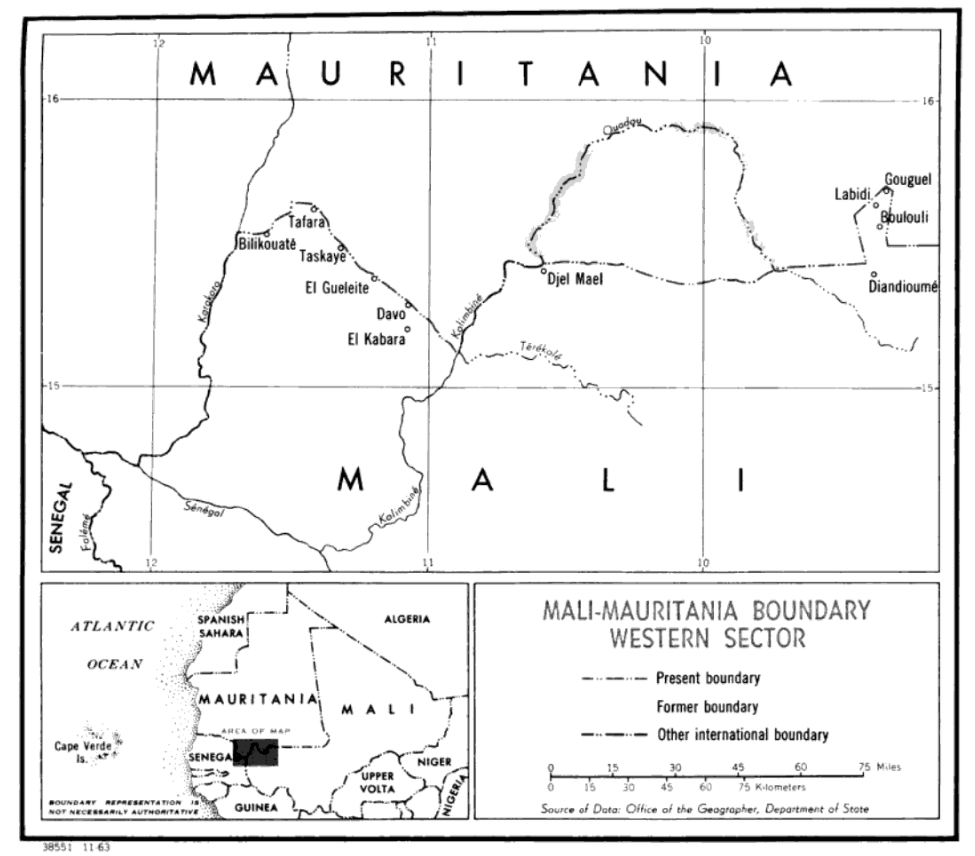
Close-up of the western section

Maps of the Mali-Mauritania border

The Mali–Mauritania border is 2,236 km (1,389 mi) in length and runs from the tripoint with Algeria in the north to the tripoint with Senegal in the south-west.

== Description ==
The border starts in the north at the tripoint with Algeria, and then proceeds westwards in a straight line along the 25th parallel north for 172 km (107 m). It then turns south-east in a long straight segment of some 955 km (593 m), followed by a much shorter straight line further to the south-east for 34 km (21 m), and a straight line to south-west for 94 km (59 m), before veering sharply to the west along a horizontal line for some 409 km (254 m). The border then briefly shifts northwards, creating a small protrusion of Malian territory encompassing the towns of Labidi and Debai Amati. Following this, the border then continues westwards via series of irregular lines, as well as following some streams such as the Oumm el Bohoro and the Ouadou. It eventually reaches the Kolinbiné River, which it follows down to confluence with the Senegal River; the boundary then follows the latter west to the tripoint with Senegal.

== History ==
The 1880s saw an intense competition between the European powers for territories in Africa, a process known as the Scramble for Africa. The process culminated in the Berlin Conference of 1884, in which the European nations concerned agreed upon their respective territorial claims and the rules of engagements going forward. As a result of this France gained control the upper valley of the Niger River (roughly equivalent to the areas of modern Mali and Niger). France occupied this area in 1900, followed by Mauritania in 1903–4. Mali (then referred to as French Sudan) was originally included, along with modern Niger and Burkina Faso, within the Upper Senegal and Niger colony, however it was later split off and, along with Mauritania, became a constituent of the federal colony of French West Africa (Afrique occidentale française, abbreviated AOF).

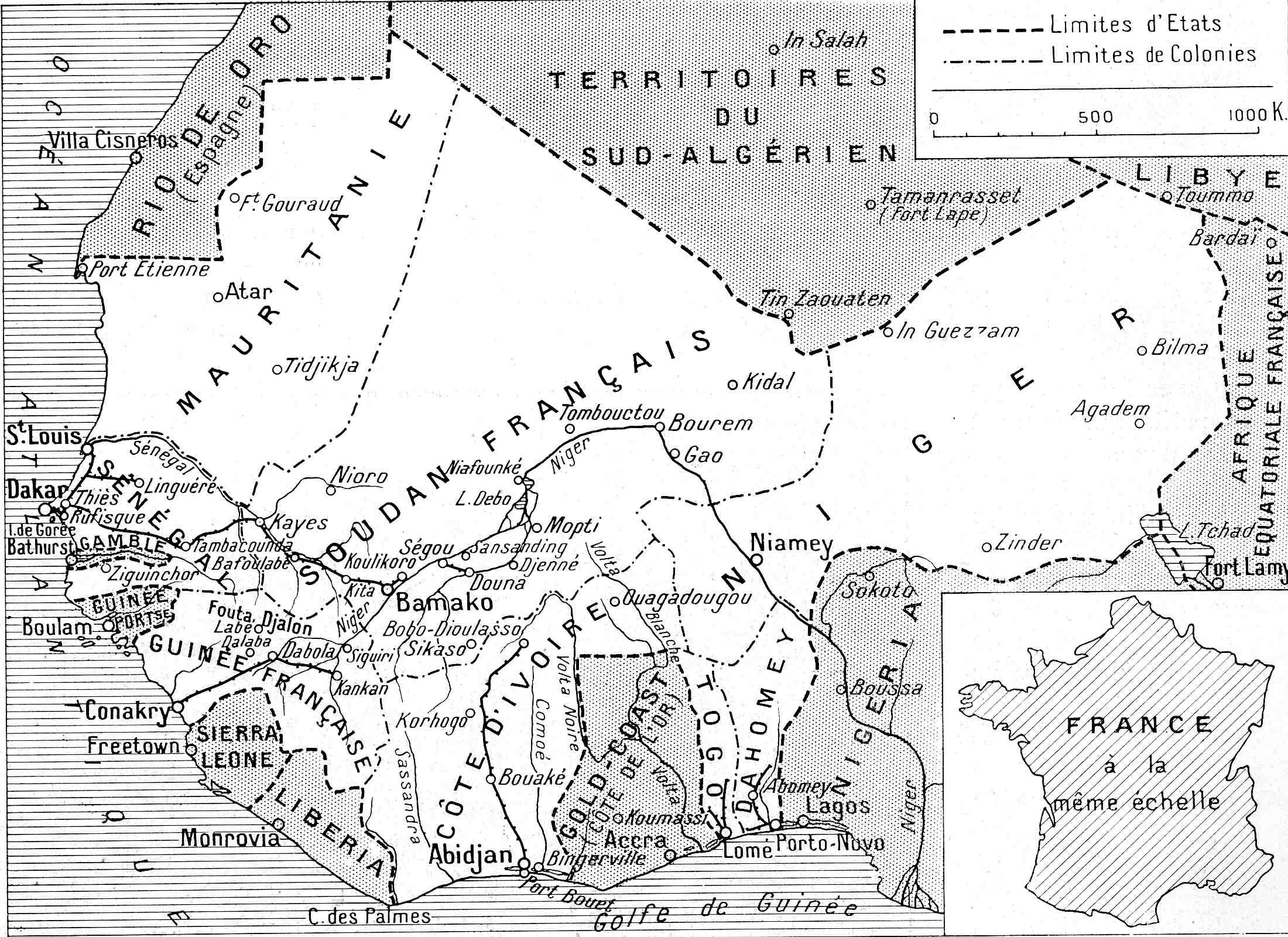
Map of French West Africa from 1936, showing the former Mali-Mauritania border

Mauritania had been largely 'pacified' by 1912, and an initial border between Mali and Mauritania was then drawn on 23 April 1913; this line was drastically different to the current border, with Mali encompassing the entirety of what is now south-east Mauritania (see map right). A decree of 5 July 1944 altered the border to roughly its current position. Another decree of October 1944 would have transferred further territory to Mauritania in the south, however this was never enacted.

As the movement for decolonisation grew in the post-Second World War era, France gradually granted more political rights and representation for their sub-Saharan African colonies, culminating in the granting of broad internal autonomy to French West Africa in 1958 within the framework of the French Community. Eventually, in 1960, both Mauritania and Mali were granted full independence. On 16 February 1963 the two states signed a boundary treaty at Kayes, modifying the boundary slightly.

In recent years the border region has become very insecure, due to a rise in terrorism and the war in northern Mali, prompting Mauritania to declare the border a 'no-go zone' in 2017.

However, the border line remains undetermined.

== Settlements near the border ==
=== Mali ===
- Aguerakten
- Beidat
- Bona Hamadi
- Mame
- Farkeli
- Kassakare
- Ballé
- Bineou
- Diandioume
- Debai Amate
- Labidi
- Djeli-Mahe
- Takoutala
- Kemiss
- Diongaga
- Tafara
- Davo
- Seliferi
- Melgue
- Lany Tounka
- Tafacirga

=== Mauritania ===
- Medala
- Koussana
- Terbekou
- Bousteila
- Moribougou
- Koriga
- Kersiniane
- Kalinioro

== See also ==
- Mali–Mauritania relations
