= Guiré attack =

2019 battle of the Mali War

- Part of Mali War
Date	April 21, 2019
Location	Guiré, Mali
Result	JNIM victory

Belligerents
Mali	Jama'at Nasr al-Islam wal Muslimin

Casualties and losses
11 killed (per Malian government and UN); 16 killed, 21 injured (per JNIM and local officials)	4 killed (per JNIM); 15 killed (per Malian government)

On April 21, 2019, Jama'at Nasr al-Islam wal Muslimin attacked a Malian military base at Guiré, Mali, as revenge for the Ogossagou massacre.

== Prelude ==
On March 23, Dan Na Ambassagou killed 160 Fulani villagers in the village of Ogossagou, due to the stereotype that Fulani people, who are mainly Muslim herders, support jihadist groups like JNIM and Islamic State in the Greater Sahara. Fulani groups demonstrated against the Malian government, who declared the dissolution of Dan Na Ambassagou. The Wagadou forest in Koulikoro has been a hub for JNIM activity throughout 2019, and the group often attacked Malian positions before retreating back into the forest.

== Attack ==
At 5am on April 21, JNIM fighters launched a raid on the Malian base at Guiré from the Wagadou forest, setting fire to several Malian vehicles. The Malian government later claimed that they dispatched reinforcements to the area immediately after the attack. JNIM claimed the attack as retaliation for the Ogossagou massacre.

The Malian government claimed 11 soldiers were killed, and several were injured, while 15 jihadists were killed. A Malian official stated 12 soldiers were killed, including the commander of the post. The Malian Press Agency gave a toll of 16 killed and 21 injured. The UN, in a May 31, 2019 report, corroborated the toll of 11 killed. JNIM claimed 16 soldiers were killed and two taken hostage, while 4 fighters were killed.
