= Ouagadou =

- Commune
- Location in Mali
- Coordinates: 14°59′27″N 7°27′14″W
- Country: Mali
- Region: Koulikoro Region
- Cercle: Nara Cercle

Population (2009)
  - Total: 19,123
- Time zone: UTC+0 (GMT)

Ouagadou is a commune in the Cercle of Nara in the Koulikoro Region of south-western Mali. The commune contains the town of Goumbou which is the administrative centre and 6 villages. In the 2009 census the commune had a population of 19,123. Goumbou is 28 km southwest of Nara, the administrative centre (chef-lieu) of the cercle.

== Sister city ==
- Vegas del Genil, Spain
