= Dogofry =

Dogofry may refer to:

- Dogofry, Koulikoro
- Dogofry, Ségou
