= INmusic Festival =

Annual music festival in Croatia

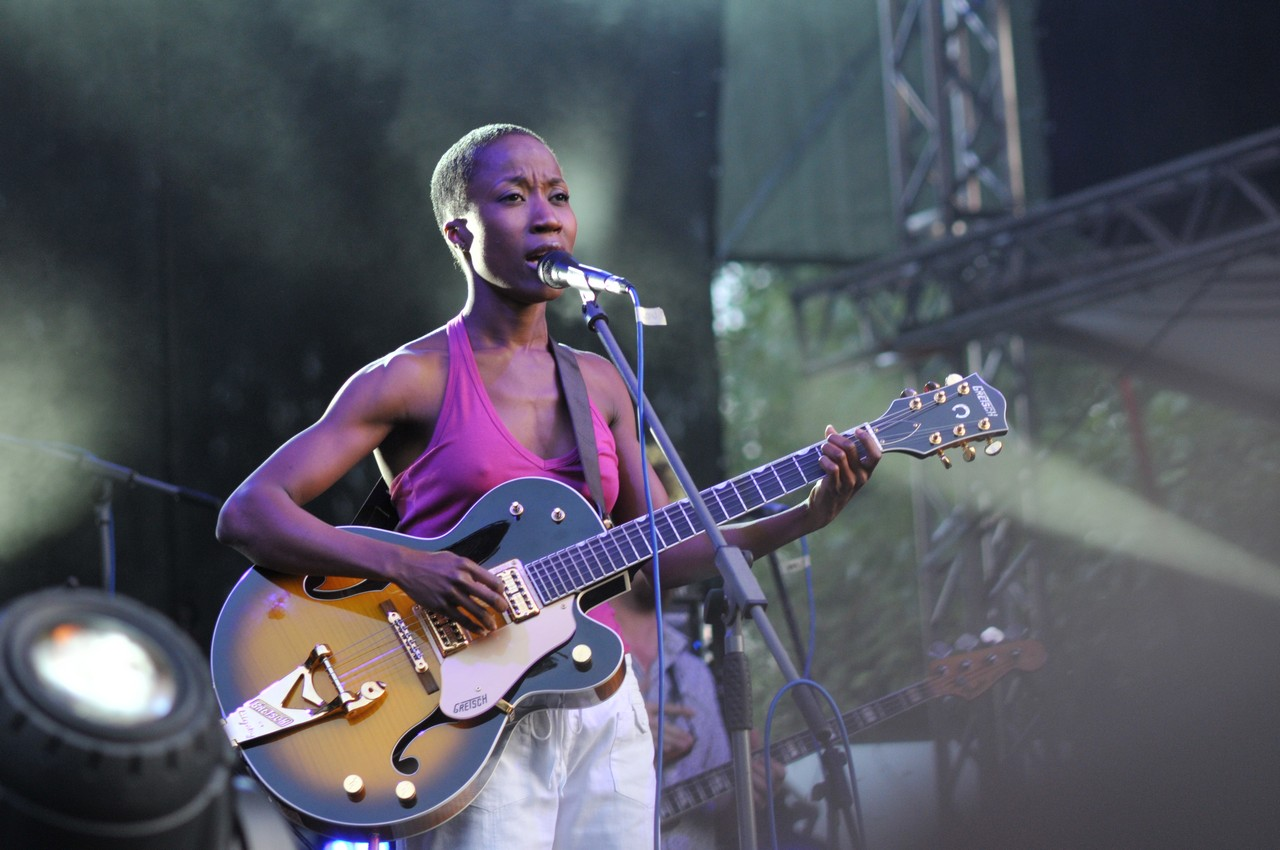
- Rokia Traoré performing in 2009.
- Genre: Rock, world, electronic, reggae, folk, hip hop, dance
- Dates: Late June (2–3 days)
- Locations: Lake Jarun, Zagreb, Croatia
- Years active: 2006–present
- Attendance: c. 100,000 (2022)
- Website: www.inmusicfestival.com/en/

INmusic festival is Croatia's biggest international contemporary music open-air festival. The festival is held annually in late June in Zagreb and takes place on the Isle of Youth (Croatian: Otok hrvatske mladeži) in the middle of Zagreb's Lake Jarun. The festival was started in 2006 and is usually held over three days. It includes several genre-specific stages with internationally renowned indie rock, heavy metal and electronica artists. In 2008 The Times included INmusic among the top 20 European summer festivals, and it made the CNN's 2013 list of 50 greatest summer music festivals in the world. NME (New Musical Express) has reported from the festival since 2015 and hailed the festival as "the hidden festival gem of Europe" as well as listing it among the world's top festival since 2017.

== History ==
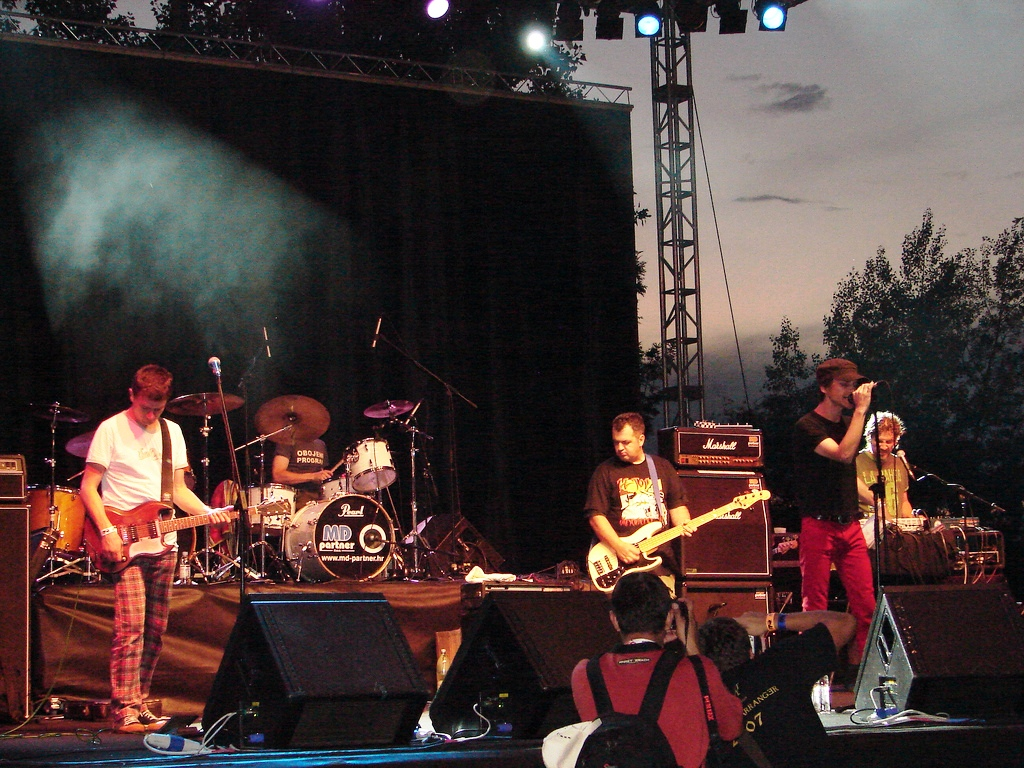
Obojeni Program perform in 2007

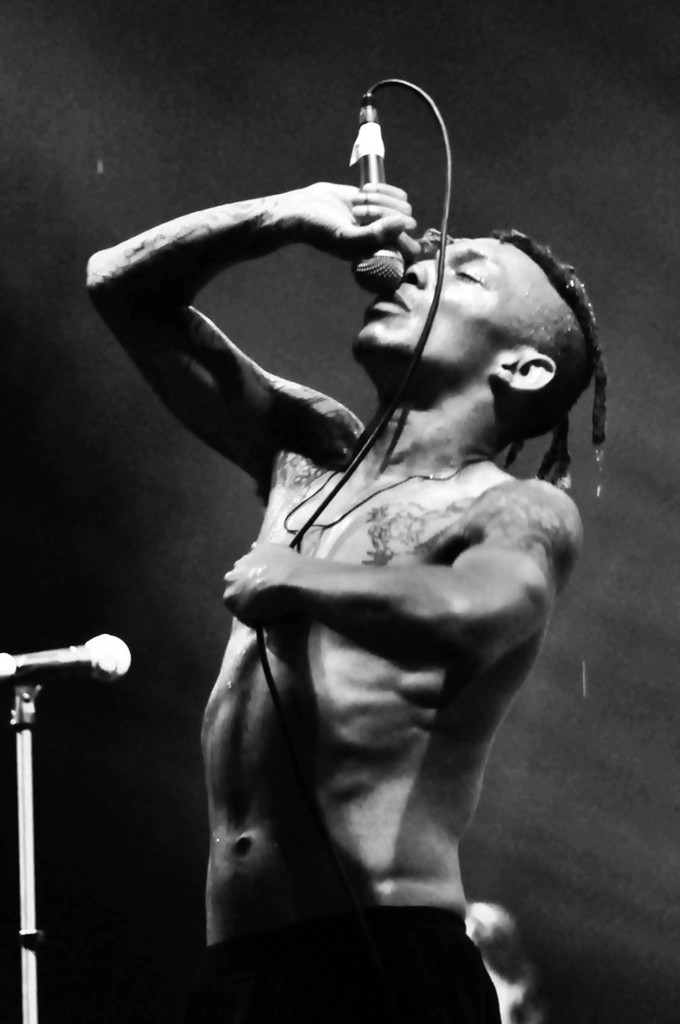
Tricky performing at the 2009 INmusic festival.

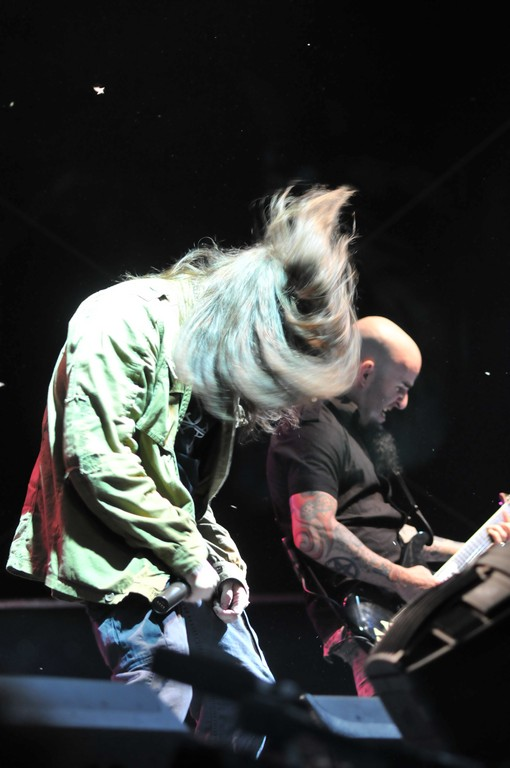
Anthrax performing in 2009

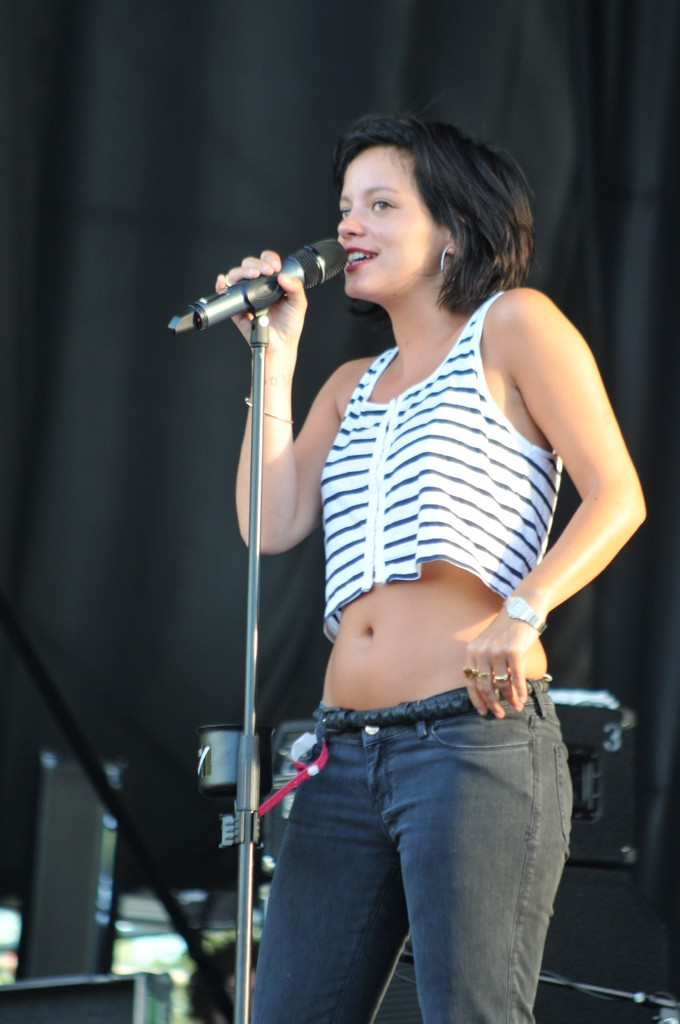
Lily Allen in 2009.

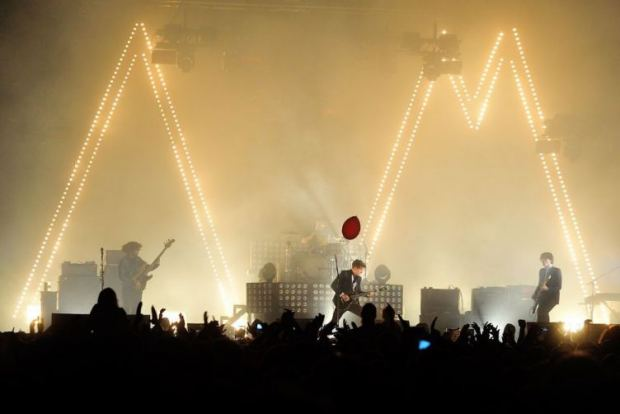
Arctic Monkeys in 2013.

=== 2006 ===
The festival's first edition was held as "INmusic festival" from 4–6 July 2006. It was organized by Multikultura, a non-governmental organisation, and held at Šalata.

- Headliners: Franz Ferdinand and Morrissey
- Also performed: Archie Bronson Outfit, The Ex
- Local artists: Edo Maajka, Darkwood Dub, Ramirez

=== 2007 ===
The second festival edition was held from 27 to 28 August 2007. Due to the festival's growing attendance a larger venue was necessary, so in 2007 the festival moved to the Isle of Youth at lake Jarun, and it was the first edition which took place at Jarun.

- Headliners: Sonic Youth and The Stooges
- Also performed: Happy Mondays, Asian Dub Foundation, New York Dolls, Róisín Murphy, !!! (Chk Chk Chk), Kultur Shock, The Hold Steady, Gilles Peterson, Banco de Gaia
- Local artists: Majke, The Beat Fleet, Gustafi, Obojeni program, Letu štuke, and others

=== 2008 ===
The third festival edition took place from June 3–4, 2008 at Jarun.

- Headliners: Nick Cave and the Bad Seeds and The Prodigy
- Also performed: Stereo MCs, Serj Tankian, Hot Chip, Tinariwen, Amadou & Mariam, The Go! Team, Seun Kuti and Egypt 80, Sons and Daughters, Dreadzone, Jazzanova, XX Teens, Ed Kuepper & Jeffrey Wegener
- Local artists: Let 3, Kiril Džajkovski, Vještice, Atheist Rap, and others

=== 2009 ===
For fourth festival edition took place from June 24–25, 2009 at Jarun. Scottish band Franz Ferdinand made their second appearance at the event.

- Headliners: Franz Ferdinand, Moby, Kraftwerk, N.E.R.D., Lily Allen
- Also performed: Yeah Yeah Yeahs, Tricky, Editors, Dimmu Borgir, Anthrax, Hatebreed, Art Brut, Sergent Garcia, Rokia Traoré, Adrian Sherwood, Richard Dorfmeister, God Dethroned
- Local artists: Kiril Džajkovski, Kawasaki 3P, and others

=== 2010 ===
The fifth edition of INmusic festival took place from June 21–23, 2010 at lake Jarun.

- Headliners: Alice in Chains, Billy Idol, Massive Attack, LCD Soundsystem, The Flaming Lips
- Also performed: Morcheeba, !!! (Chk Chk Chk), Pendulum, Rise Against, Flogging Molly, Broken Social Scene, Audio Bullys, New Young Pony Club, Caribou, Skindred, Martina Topley-Bird
- Local artists: The Beat Fleet, Kawasaki 3P, Gustafi, The Bambi Molesters, and others

=== 2011 ===
The festival's sixth edition took place from June 21–22, 2011, at Zagreb's lake Jarun.

- Headliners: Jamiroquai, Cypress Hill, Arcade Fire, Grinderman
- Also performed: The Streets, TV on the Radio, Mastodon, Jello Biafra, Buraka Som Sistema, Gentleman, The Dø
- Local artists: Dubioza kolektiv, Overflow, Elemental

=== 2012 ===
The festival's seventh edition was held from June 28–30 of June 2012. INmusic festival #7 was selected in the Top 50 World's best music festivals according to CNN International.

- Headliners: Franz Ferdinand, New Order, Gorillaz Sound System
- Also performed: Gorillaz Sound System, Mando Diao, Gogol Bordello, Archie Bronson Outfit, Retro Stefson, General Elektriks, Ines Mezel, Tamikrest, Fanga, Dry the River, Human Woman, Reptile Youth, Stuttgart Online
- Local artists: Vlasta Popić, Markiz, Ruiz, Valetudo, Hype, Pozdrav Azri, Punčke, Igut, Sick Swing Orchestra

=== 2013 ===
The festival's eighth edition was held from June 24–26, 2013.

- Headliners: Arctic Monkeys, Iggy & The Stooges
- Also performed: Basement Jaxx, Bloc Party, Editors, NOFX, Airbourne, Stealing Sheep, A Toys Orchestra, Mile Me Deaf, Rangleklods, Conquering Lion, Dikta, Roger the Mascot
- Local artists: Atheist Rap, Team Ghost, Dža ili Bu, S.A.R.S., Frenkie, Moveknowledgment, Pozdrav Azri, Gatuzo, Dosh Lee, She Loves Pablo, Radio Aktiv, Barbari, Antenat, Mašinko, Cherkezi United, D Elvis, B and the Boops, Achromatic Attic, Udriground

=== 2014 ===
The ninth edition of INmusic festival was held from June 23–25, 2014. With a growing number of festival attendees and need for additional camping accommodation for visitors from abroad, the festival expanded and moved the festival campsite to the neighboring Trešnjevka Isle which was connected to the festival site for the duration of the three festival days by a 100 meter long pontoon bridge over the lake.

- Headliners: The Black Keys, Pixies, MGMT, Foals
- Also performed: The Fratellis, Wolfmother, Flogging Molly, Bombay Bicycle Club, Digitalism, Crystal Fighters, Bassekou Kouyate & Ngoni Ba, Bomba Estereo, Vitalic, Bombino, Jagwar Ma, Kuroma, Linkoban, Animal Music, Roger the Mascot, Streets of Mars, Stop Drop Robot.
- Local artists: Partibrejkers, Rambo Amadeus, Vlada Divljan, Ljetno Kino, Gatuzo, Kandžija i Gole Žene, S3ngs, N'toko, Žen, Baden-Baden, Elephant and the Moon, Pars Petrosa, Ti, Hype, Them Moose Rush, Your Gay Thoughts, The Canyon Observer, YEM kolektiv

=== 2015 ===
The tenth INmusic festival was held from 22 to 25 June 2015.The festival featured a closing ceremony and fireworks in celebrations of the tenth anniversary.

- Headliners: Placebo, FFS (band), Rudimental, Paolo Nutini
- Also performed: Of Monsters and Men, La Roux, Future Islands, Frank Turner & The Sleeping Souls, Death Cab for Cutie, Black Rebel Motorcycle Club, Eagles of Death Metal, Kae Tempest, Mike Skinner, Batida, Aziza Brahim, Katalina Kicks, The Mirror Trap, Royal Prospect, Comminor, Among Souls, Northlight, Telephonehookers, John Bull Gang, Dum i Huet, Charlie Harlow, Neweva, In Hours, Decaville, Antrox
- Local artists: Halka, Rambo Amadeus, Zadruga, Repetitor, Ljetno Kino, Jonathan, Ludovik Material, Sassja, Them Moose Rush, Killed a Fox, Muscle Tribe of Danger and Excellence, Ashes You Leave, NLV, Mnogi Drugi, Mel Camino, Clone Age, Mel & Django Jet, Čao Portorož, Jardier, And the Kid, Human, The Belle Infidels, Plastic Knives, Discohernia, DJ Ilko, YEM kolektiv...

INmusic festival was nominated for a European Festival Award in the Best Medium Sized Festival Category.

=== 2016 ===
INmusic festival #11 took place on 20–22 June 2016 in Zagreb, Croatia, in the isles of lake Jarun. In 2016 INmusic festival introduced a one of a kind 360 degree VJ stage inside the first world replica of the iconic Tesla Tower, inspired by the Croatian-born scientist and genius Nikola Tesla and in hommage to the recent passing of David Bowie who portrayed Tesla in Christoper Nolan's 2006 film The Prestige, but more importantly represented a symbol of musical innovation and genre bending in contemporary music.

- Monday, June 20: Gutterdämmerung ft. Henry Rollins, Jake Bugg, The Coral, Django Django, Pennywise, Monoswezi, Nikki Louder, FùGù MANGO, The Bambi Molesters, Chui...
- Tuesday, June 21: Florence + The Machine, Barns Courtney, Kawasaki 3p, Orkesta Mendoza, My Baby, Gretta, Spleen G...
- Wednesday, June 22: PJ Harvey, The Kooks, Wilco, Yeasayer, Pat Thomas & The Kwashibu Area Band, Shearwater, Gustafi, Žen...

=== 2017 ===
INmusic festival #12 took place at lake Jarun in Zagreb, Croatia from 19 to 21 June 2017.

- Monday, June 19: Arcade Fire, Michael Kiwanuka, Darko Rundek Apocalypso Now, Th' Legendary Shack Shakers, Throes + The Shine, Haus, St.Tropez
- Tuesday, June 20: Kings of Leon, Alt-J, Repetitor, The Strange, Kel Assouf, Public Service Broadcasting, Gatuzo, Them Moose Rush
- Wednesday, June 21: Kasabian, Flogging Molly, Slaves, Danko Jones, Booka Shade

INmusic festival #12 was sold a week before the start of the festival.

=== 2018 ===
INmusic festival #13 took place at lake Jarun in Zagreb, Croatia from June 25–27, 2018 featuring performances by:

- Monday, June 25 – Queens Of The Stone Age, David Byrne, The Kills, Superorganism, Témé Tan, Them Moose Rush, Straight Mickey And The Boyz, False Heads, Tyger Lamb, Rival Bones, Tus Nua, Nellcote, Grapevine Babies
- Tuesday, June 26 – Nick Cave & The Bad Seeds, St. Vincent, Bombino, Jinx, Reykjavíkurdætur, Šumski, Koala Voice, Irena Žilić, J.R. August, ZMaJ, Lika Kolorado, Ischariotzcky, Bad Notion
- Wednesday, June 27 – Interpol, Alice In Chains, Portugal. The Man, General Elektriks, PINS, Tschegue, Super Besse, She Loves Pablo, Moskau, Sana Garić, Killed A Fox, Cubies, Rens Argoa, Futurski

INmusic festival #13 was sold a week before the start of the festival for a second year in a row.

=== 2019 ===
INmusic festival #14 took place at lake Jarun in Zagreb, Croatia from June 24–26, 2019 featuring performances by:

- Monday, June 24: Foals, The Hives, Johnny Marr, Kurt Vile & The Violators, Skindred, Siddharta, Fontaines D.C., Edi East Trance Blues
- Tuesday, June 25: Suede, Garbage, Thievery Corporation, Frank Turner & The Sleeping Souls, Zeal & Ardor, Gato Preto, Black Honey, Lysistrata
- Wednesday, June 26: The Cure, LP, Peter Bjorn & John, Kandžija i Gole žene, ManGroove, The Ills and Run Sofa

=== 2020/21 ===
The 2020 Inmusic Festival was originally postponed until 2021 due to the COVID-19 pandemic. The rescheduled festival was itself also cancelled due to the continuation of the pandemic and was rescheduled to take place between 20 and 22 June 2022.

=== 2024 ===
- June 24: The National, Viagra Boys, The Gaslight Anthem, Sleaford Mods, Deadletter
- June 25: Hozier, Paolo Nutini, Gossip, Dogstar, Sprints
- June 26: The Smashing Pumpkins, Royksopp, Bombay Bicycle Club, Ibibro Sound Machine
