= Mamoudou Gassama =

Malian-French hero and firefighter

- Born: 1996 (age 29–30); Yaguine, Kayes Region, Mali
- Other names: Real life Superhero; Real life Spiderman; The Malian-French Hero; "Spider-Man" of Paris; Black Spiderman
- Occupation: Firefighter
- Known for: Rescuing a four-year-old boy who was hanging from highest level of building balcony (recorded with digital proof - camera - uploaded via YouTube)

Mamoudou Gassama (born 1996, also known as Spider-Man of Paris) is a Malian-French citizen, who, on 26 May 2018, climbed four stories on the exterior of a block of flats in the 18th arrondissement of Paris (51 rue Marx-Dormoy) in 30 seconds to save a four-year-old boy who was hanging from a balcony. The child’s father had apparently left the boy unattended to go shopping, and was subsequently charged with leaving his son unsupervised.

== Aftermath ==
Paris Mayor Anne Hidalgo called Gassama "Spider-Man of the 18th" in reference to the city’s 18th arrondissement (district) where the rescue took place. On 28 May 2018, President Emmanuel Macron met Gassama at the Élysée Palace to thank him personally. He was awarded the Médaille d’honneur pour acte de courage et de dévouement and offered a role in the fire service which he subsequently took up. At the instigation of President Macron, Gassama was made a French citizen in September 2018.

== Personal life ==
Gassama was born in Yaguine, Mali. In 2013, he travelled to Europe via Burkina Faso, Niger and Libya, where he was arrested and beaten. While crossing the Mediterranean, he was picked up by a rescue ship as part of Operation Mare Nostrum and obtained papers to stay legally in Italy. After spending some years in a refugee accommodation in Castelnuovo di Porto, during which time he completed training as a pizzaiolo, he travelled to France in September 2017 to join his elder brother. News reports emphasized the similarity between Gassama and Lassana Bathily, a Muslim immigrant from Mali who was hailed as a hero in France and offered citizenship for his bravery in the Hypercacher kosher supermarket siege of 2015. On 24 June 2018 Gassama received the BET Humanitarian Award in Los Angeles.

As of July 2018, Gassama was working as a firefighter in the Paris fire brigade. However, he was not able to continue his experience within the Paris fire brigade, because he had not obtained France's lower-secondary school certificate (brevet des collèges) and had a medical condition that made him ineligible to serve as a firefighter.

In 2021, three years after the rescue that made him famous, Mamoudou Gassama alternated between unemployment and precarious work, particularly in households. Considering himself poorly surrounded, he was unable to carry out several projects close to his heart—making a film, writing a book, and founding an association raising awareness among young Malians of the dangers of migration via the Mediterranean.

As of December 2023, married and father of two children, he believed that his life had become "quiet". He was then a security guard and had a series of fixed-term contracts. He lives in Montreuil in accommodation offered by the town hall.

== Popular media ==
A story about Mamoudou Gassama's courageous act was featured on the TV Documentary The Proof Is Out There.
