= Allahina =

- Commune and town
- Location in Mali
- Coordinates: 15°13′39″N 8°44′25″W
- Country: Mali
- Region: Koulikoro Region
- Cercle: Nara Cercle

Area
  - Total: 1,551 km^{2} (599 sq mi)

Population (2009)
  - Total: 11,673
  - Density: 7.526/km^{2} (19.49/sq mi)
- Time zone: UTC+0 (GMT)

Allahina is a small town and rural commune in the Cercle of Nara in the Koulikoro Region of south-western Mali. The town lies 31 km south of the Mauritanian border and 156 km west of Nara, the administrative centre of the cercle. The commune, which includes the town and seven of the surrounding villages, had a population of 11,683 in the 2009 census.
