= Ballé, Mali =

Ballé
- Village
- Location in Mali
- Coordinates: 15°20′20″N 8°35′7″W
- Country: Mali
- Region: Koulikoro Region
- Cercle: Nara Cercle
- Commune: Dogofry
- Elevation: 285 m (935 ft)
- Time zone: UTC+0 (GMT)

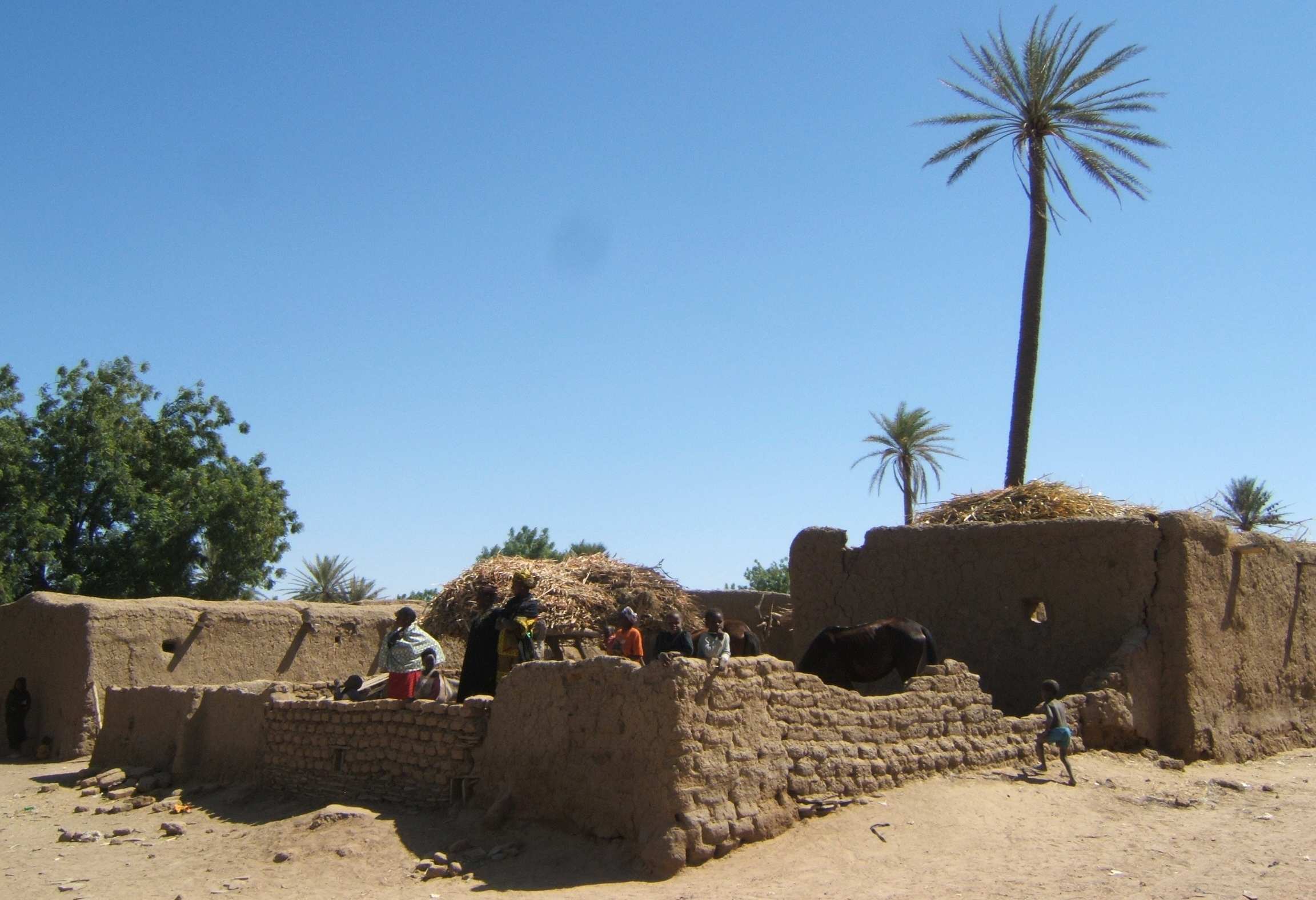
Balle, Mali

Ballé is a village and seat of the commune of Dogofry in the Cercle of Nara in the Koulikoro Region of south-western Mali, just south the border with Mauritania.
