= Diongaga =

- Town
- Location in Mali
- Coordinates: 15°4′30″N 10°52′40″W
- Country: Mali
- Region: Kayes Region
- Cercle: Yélimané Cercle
- Commune: Diafounou Dionaga
- Time zone: UTC+0 (GMT)

Diongaga is a small town and principal settlement of the commune of Diafounou Diongaga in the Cercle of Yélimané in the Kayes Region of south-western Mali, located just south of the border with Mauritania.
