= Dogofiry =

- Small town
- Location in Mali
- Coordinates: 15°0′45″N 10°56′30″W
- Country: Mali
- Region: Kayes Region
- Cercle: Yélimané Cercle
- Commune: Marekaffo
- Time zone: UTC+0 (GMT)

Dogofiry is a small town and principal settlement of the commune of Marekaffo in the Cercle of Yélimané in the Kayes Region of south-western Mali.
