= Kersignané =

- Village
- Location in Mali
- Coordinates: 14°59′35″N 10°59′06″W
- Country: Mali
- Region: Kayes Region
- Cercle: Yélimané Cercle
- Commune: Konsiga
- Time zone: UTC+0 (GMT)

Kersignané is a village and the principal settlement of the commune of Konsiga in the historical Diafounou region, in the Cercle of Yélimané in the Kayes Region of western Mali.
