= Mahmoud Barry =

- Nicknames: Abou Yehiya, Cheikh Yahya
- Born: 1970 (age 54–55) Koro, Mali
- Allegiance: Katiba Macina (2015-present); ANSIPRJ (2016); Jama'at Nasr al-Islam wal Muslimin (2017-present)
- Rank: Emir of ANSIPRJ (2016); Second-in command (Katiba Macina) (2020-present); JNIM shura member (2022-present); Spokesperson of JNIM (2022-present)
- Battles / wars: Mali War: Battle of Nara; 2016 Nampala attack

Mahmoud Barry, war name Abou Yehiya, is a Malian jihadist and second-in-command of Katiba Macina. Since 2022 he has been the spokesperson of Jama'at Nasr al-Islam wal Muslimin.

== Biography ==
Barry was born in 1979 in Koro, Mali. He is the father of eight children and was an imam in Senou, near Bamako. He is a Fulani.

On May 18, 2016, Barry appeared in the first video released by Katiba Macina, an Ansar Dine-affiliated group in Mopti Region. He likely planned and participated in the battle of Nara in June 2016 and the Nampala attack in July 2016. During the Nampala attack, he served as the military commander of Fulani rebel group ANSIPRJ.

Barry was arrested by Malian security services on July 26, 2016, a week after the Nampala attack, in the Wagadou forest between Nampala and Dogofry.

In October 2020, Barry and several other Jama'at Nasr al-Islam wal Muslimin (Note: Katiba Macina and four other jihadist groups merged into JNIM in 2017.)(JNIM) were released in exchange for four hostages, including Soumaïla Cissé and Sophie Pétronin. Back in JNIM, he joined the group's shura and became second-in-command of Katiba Macina under Amadou Koufa. Barry appeared in a July 2022 video by JNIM announcing the group's intention to launch attacks on the state capital Bamako. He announced his intentions to bring Mali under Sharia law, and claimed that Katiba members were operating around Bamako.

Since July 2022, Barry has been the spokesperson of JNIM.
