= Kirané =

- Town
- Location in Mali
- Coordinates: 15°24′36″N 10°13′23″W
- Country: Mali
- Region: Kayes Region
- Cercle: Yélimané Cercle
- Commune: Kirané Kaniaga
- Time zone: UTC+0 (GMT)

Kirané is a small town and principal settlement of the commune of Kirané Kaniaga in the Cercle of Yélimané in the Kayes Region of south-western Mali.
