= 2023 Nara ambush =

2023 battle of the Mali War

- Location: Near Nara and the Wagadou Forest, Koulikoro Region, Mali
- Date: April 18, 2023
- Target: Oumar Traore
- Deaths: 4
- Victims: 1 kidnapped (per Mali); 2 kidnapped (per JNIM)
- Perpetrator: Jama'at Nasr al-Islam wal Muslimin

On April 18, 2023, militants from Jama'at Nasr al-Islam wal Muslimin ambushed a car transporting Malian Chief of Staff Oumar Traore near Nara, Koulikoro Region, Mali, killing him and three other passengers. The ambush was one of the most high-profile assassinations of Malian political figures by JNIM.

== Background ==
Nara has long been a site of jihadist activity in northern Mali, particularly by al-Qaeda affililates like Jama'at Nasr al-Islam wal Muslimin and its predecessor Al-Qaeda in the Islamic Maghreb. While JNIM has historically targeted local leaders opposed to its rule and influence, particularly in eastern Mali and the Dogon Country, there have been relatively few targeted killings of Malian political figures. Oumar Traore was the Presidential Chief of Staff for Assimi Goïta, who had taken control of Mali in a coup in 2021.

== Ambush ==
At the time of the attack, Traore was traveling in a car with two drivers and the head of a drilling company while en route to a prospective drilling site near Nara and the Wagadou Forest. Malian authorities did not state how many cars were traveling in Traore's convoy, when they died, or who committed the attack. Another driver in the car at the time of the attack was kidnapped. In their statement on April 21, JNIM claimed responsibility for the attack, and claimed that they killed Traore and two members of the army, along with the capture of two hostages.
