= Suresh Phukan =

Indian Musician

Suresh Phukan was a singer, lyricist, music composer, writer, poet, actor, director, social activist and professor from Assam, India.

== Early life ==
He was born in Koronga village (Bokota Mouza) in Sivasagar district of Assam in 1953. His contribution towards music covers 11 audio cassettes, 1 EP record and more than 500 songs. He was known as "Janatar Xilpi". He wrote many books and articles on various issues of society.

He was the Head of the Department of Education in Sibsagar Girls’ College. Before that, he rendered his service as a lecturer in H.C.D.G. College, Nitaipukhuri, Sivasagar. He wrote reference books in Education.

He died on 12 March 1991 from mental shock and injuries caused by electrocutions and beatings.
