= Marekaffo =

- Commune
- Location in Mali
- Coordinates: 15°0′45″N 10°56′30″W
- Country: Mali
- Region: Kayes Region
- Cercle: Yélimané Cercle

Population (2009 census)
  - Total: 4,548
- Time zone: UTC+0 (GMT)

Marekaffo is a commune in the Cercle of Yélimané in the Kayes Region of south-western Mali. The administrative centre (chef-lieu) is the small town of Dogofiry. In 2009 the commune had a population of 4,548.
