= Kirané Kaniaga =

Kirané
- Commune
- Location in Mali
- Coordinates: 15°24′36″N 10°13′23″W
- Country: Mali
- Region: Kayes Region
- Cercle: Yélimané Cercle

Population (2009)
  - Total: 35,007
- Time zone: UTC+0 (GMT)

Kirané is commune in the Cercle of Yélimané in the Kayes Region of south-western Mali. The administrative centre (chef-lieu) is the small town of Kirané. In 2009 the commune had a population of 35,007.

== See also ==
- Kaniaga, the historical region that gives the commune its name
