= Boulal =

- Village
- Location in Mali
- Coordinates: 15°4′51″N 8°25′37″W
- Country: Mali
- Region: Koulikoro Region
- Cercle: Nara Cercle
- Commune: Dabo
- Time zone: UTC+0 (GMT)

Boulal is a village and seat of the commune of Dabo in the Cercle of Nara in the Koulikoro Region of south-western Mali.
