= Yélimané =

- Commune and town
- Location in Mali
- Coordinates: 15.118°N 10.572°W
- Country: Mali
- Region: Kayes Region
- Cercle: Yélimané Cercle
- Commune: Guidimé
- Time zone: UTC+0 (GMT)

Yélimané is a town and principal settlement of the commune of Guidimé in the Cercle of Yélimané in the Kayes Region, in south-western Mali, near the border of Mauritania.

Yélimané is served by Yélimané Airport.

== History ==
The oldest settlement on the site is the suburb of Yelimane Sebe, which was the headquarters of Garan Coulibaly, the governor of the area when it was dominated by Kaarta, c. 1774-1854. In that year the tata was assaulted and taken in a four-hour battle by El Hajj Umar Tall. Yelimane Sebe became a Tukolor base, until it was taken and burned by French forces on December 22nd, 1890.

At that point, Yelimane proper (Yelimane Grand) was created as a French military post and was garrisoned until 1922. In order to ensure an available supply of labor, in 1895 the French established a Village de liberté for freed slaves nearby, which became the suburb of Dugubara.
