= Koronga =

- Commune and village
- Location in Mali
- Coordinates: 15°20′0″N 7°36′30″W
- Country: Mali
- Region: Koulikoro Region
- Cercle: Nara Cercle

Population (2009 census)
  - Total: 7,931
- Time zone: UTC+0 (GMT)

Koronga is a village and commune in the Cercle of Nara in the Koulikoro Region of south-western Mali. The village is 40 km northwest of Nara, the administrative centre of the cercle, and 20 km south of the Mauritanian border. The commune contains 17 villages and in the 2009 census had a population of 7,931.

The commune has a Sahelian climate with an annual rainfall of around 400 mm.
