= Konsiga =

- Commune
- Location in Mali
- Coordinates: 14°59′35″N 10°59′06″W
- Country: Mali
- Region: Kayes Region
- Cercle: Yélimané Cercle

Population (2009 census)
  - Total: 8,275
- Time zone: UTC+0 (GMT)

Konsiga is a commune in the Cercle of Yélimané in the Kayes Region of south-western Mali. The main village (chef-lieu) is Kersignané. In 2009 the commune had a population of 8,275.
