= Diafounou Gory =

- Commune
- Location in Mali
- Coordinates: 15°04′12″N 10°50′18″W
- Country: Mali
- Region: Kayes Region
- Cercle: Yelimane Cercle

Population (2009 census)
  - Total: 20,292
- Time zone: UTC+0 (GMT)

Diafounou Gory is commune in the Cercle of Yélimané in the Kayes Region of south-western Mali. The main town (chef-lieu) is Tambacara. In 2009 the commune had a population of 20,292.
