= Diafounou Diongaga =

- Commune
- Location in Mali
- Coordinates: 15°4′30″N 10°52′40″W
- Country: Mali
- Region: Kayes Region
- Cercle: Yelimane Cercle

Population (2009 census)
  - Total: 7,077
- Time zone: UTC+0 (GMT)

Diafounou Diongaga is a commune in the Cercle of Yélimané in the Kayes Region of south-western Mali. The administrative centre (chef-lieu) is the small town of Diongaga. In 2009 the commune had a population of 7,077.
