= Yaguine =

- Town
- Location in Mali
- Coordinates: 15°7′30″N 10°43′30″W
- Country: Mali
- Region: Kayes Region
- Cercle: Yélimané Cercle
- Commune: Toya
- Time zone: UTC+0 (GMT)

Yaguine is a small town and principal settlement (chef-lieu) of the commune of Toya in the Cercle of Yélimané in the Kayes Region of south-western Mali.
