= Marena, Yélimané =

Maréna
- Village
- Location in Mali
- Coordinates: 14°38′49″N 10°45′4″W
- Country: Mali
- Region: Kayes Region
- Cercle: Yélimané Cercle
- Commune: Tringa
- Time zone: UTC+0 (GMT)

Marena is a village and principal settlement (chef-lieu) of the commune of Tringa in the Cercle of Yélimané in the Kayes Region of south-western Mali.
