= Toya, Mali =

Toya
- Commune
- Location in Mali
- Coordinates: 15°7′30″N 10°43′30″W
- Country: Mali
- Region: Kayes Region
- Cercle: Yélimané Cercle

Population (2009 census)
  - Total: 12,922
- Time zone: UTC+0 (GMT)

Toya is a commune in the Cercle of Yélimané in the Kayes Region of south-western Mali. The administrative centre (chef-lieu) is the small town of Yaguine. In 2009 the commune had a population of 12,922.
