= Soumpou =

- Commune
- Location in Mali
- Coordinates: 15°2′18″N 10°28′43″W
- Country: Mali
- Region: Kayes Region
- Cercle: Yélimané Cercle

Population (2009 census)
  - Total: 5,017
- Time zone: UTC+0 (GMT)

Soumpou is a commune in the Cercle of Yélimané in the Kayes Region of south-western Mali. The administrative centre (chef-lieu) is the village of Takaba. In 2009 the commune had a population of 5,017.
