= Dabo, Mali =

Dabo
- Commune
- Location in Mali
- Coordinates: 15°4′51″N 8°25′37″W
- Country: Mali
- Region: Koulikoro Region
- Cercle: Nara Cercle

Area
  - Total: 2,337 km^{2} (902 sq mi)

Population (2009)
  - Total: 11,855
  - Density: 5.073/km^{2} (13.14/sq mi)
- Time zone: UTC+0 (GMT)

Dabo is a rural commune in the Cercle of Nara in the Koulikoro Region of south-western Mali. The commune contains 10 villages and had a population of 11,855 in the 2009 census. The main village is Boulal.
