= Sony, Mali =

Sony
- Commune
- Location in Mali
- Coordinates: 14°42′54″N 12°3′14″W
- Country: Mali
- Region: Kayes Region
- Cercle: Kayes Cercle

Population (2009 census)
  - Total: 11,125
- Time zone: UTC+0 (GMT)

Sony is a commune in the Cercle of Kayes in the Kayes Region of south-western Mali. The main town (chef-lieu) is Lany Tounka. The commune lies to the south of the Senegal River. In 2009 the commune had a population of 11,125.
