= Guidimé =

- Commune
- Location in Mali
- Coordinates: 15°07′05″N 10°34′19″W
- Country: Mali
- Region: Kayes Region
- Cercle: Yélimané Cercle
- Admin HQ (Chef-lieu): Yélimané

Area
  - Total: 720 km^{2} (280 sq mi)

Population (2009)
  - Total: 44,019
  - Density: 61/km^{2} (160/sq mi)
- Time zone: UTC+0 (GMT)

Guidimé is a rural commune in the Cercle of Yélimané in the Kayes Region of western Mali. The commune includes twelve villages. The administrative center (chef-lieu) is the town of Yélimané. In the 2009 census the commune had a population of 44,019.

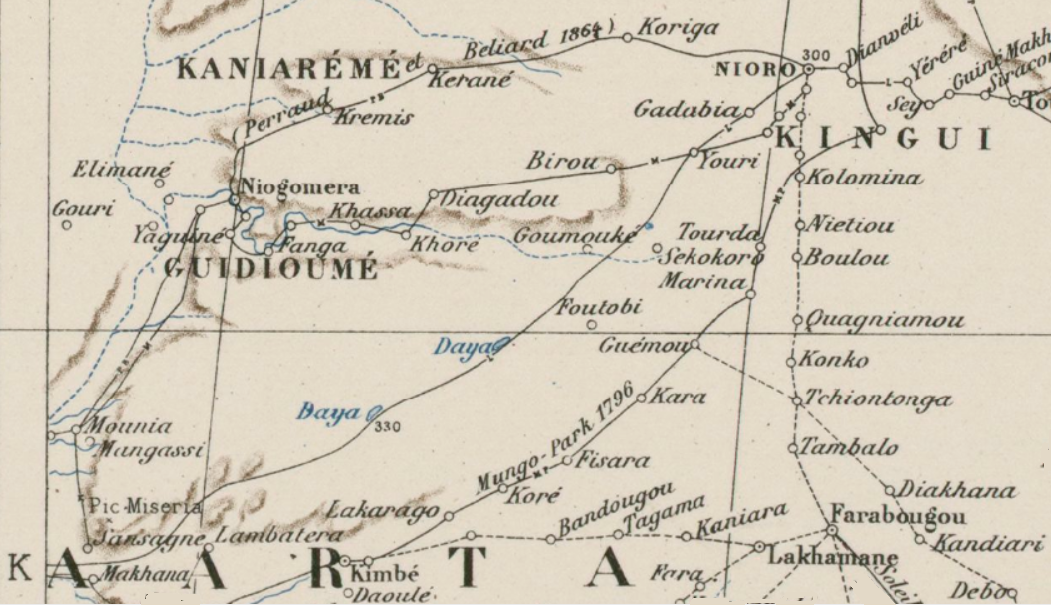
An 1892 map of Guidioume

Guidimé (sometimes spelled Guidioume or Gidyume) is named after a historical dyamare (chiefdom or confederacy). It became a canton under the French colonial regime, then a commune in the early 1990s, with the traditional elective monarchy transitioning into an elective chef de canton and then mayor of the commune.
