= National Alliance for the Protection of Fulani Identity and the Restoration of Justice =

National Alliance for the Protection of the Fulani Identity and the Restoration of Justice
- Founders: Oumar Aldiana; Sidi Bakaye Cisse
- Founded: June 21, 2016
- Dates active: June 21, 2016-November 20, 2016
- Dissolved: November 20, 2016
- Merged into: Cisse faction: Movement for the Defense of the Fatherland; Aldiana faction: MNLA and CMA-aligned groups
- Country: Mali
- Ideology: Fulani nationalism
- Size: 700 (June 2016); 2,300 (self-reported, November 2016)
- Wars: Mali War

The National Alliance for the Protection of Fulani Identity and the Restoration of Justice (ANSIPRJ) was a Fulani nationalist political and military movement formed on June 21, 2016, during the Mali War.

== Foundation and background ==
ANSIPRJ was founded on June 21, 2016, following communal violence in central Mali. In 2012, many Fulani disgruntled with the Malian government joined MUJAO, a Malian jihadist organization rebelling against the Malian government. These Fulani joined MUJAO primarily to fight against the Tuareg hegemony of the National Movement for the Liberation of Azawad instead of jihadism. In 2015, Katiba Macina, an affiliate of the jihadist group Ansar Dine, sprung up in the Mopti Region and garnered significant support among Fulani. Since the rise of Katiba Macina, Fulani have been accused of having links with jihadists. In 2016, Dental Pulaku, the "Union of Fulani", a Fulani socio-political organization, denounced mass accusations and accused the Malian army of killing fifteen Fulani civilians during the month of April 2016. At the beginning of May 2016, Bambara militiamen attacked Fulani civilians in Ténenkou Cercle, killing thirty civilians.

== Ideology and objectives ==
The ANSIPRJ announced that their objective was the protection of Fulani civilians. The group claimed to be against jihadism and Fulani independence, but stated that "the first enemy on the ground is the Malian Army." The leader of ANSIPRJ declared "Whenever we encounter Malian soldiers, we will attack them." The group also accused the Malian army and affiliated militias of the deaths of 388 Fulani.

Malian anthropologist Boukary Sangare stated many Fulani nomadic pastoralists took up arms and joined militias, including jihadists "to free themselves from the yoke of traditional chiefs and elites, to no longer pay taxes that seem unjust, and simply protect themselves against banditry."

The ANSIPRJ only participated in one notable attack, joining Ansar Dine in attacking Malian forces in the 2016 Nampala attack.

== Staff ==
ANSIPRJ was founded by Oumar al-Janah (also spelled Oumar Aldiana), who was 27 at the time of founding. Aldiana is the son of a Tuareg and a Fulani, and used to be in the MNLA. Aldiana claimed that the group had 700 men at its foundation, and grew to 2,300 fighters by November 2016. The deputy secretary is Sidy Bakaye Cisse. The militia was active in Tombouctou region, Gao region, and Segou region.

At the time of its creation, ANSIPRJ split from Dental Pulaku. The group claimed to have support from Malian politicians and the Fulani public.

== Dissolution ==
After a few months, Cisse and Aldiana had a falling out. Cisse joined the Movement for Defense of the Fatherland (MDP), a member of Platform, a coalition of pro-government Tuareg militias. Between November 19 and 20, 2016, Aldiana announced that ANSIPRJ would lay down its arms and join the Malian peace process. Aldiana announced that the fighters would join the Movement for the Salvation of Azawad, the Coalition of the People of Azawad, and the Congress for Justice in Azawad.

Aldiana stated in October 2017 that the group dissolved due to pressure from Fulani jihadists, who "refused the existence of another Fulani organization on the ground, one that isn't jihadist." He stated that ANSIPRJ did not have the means to fight back against them, and instead joined the MNLA.
