= Dogofry, Koulikoro =

Dogofry
- Commune
- Location in Mali
- Coordinates: 15°20′20″N 8°35′7″W
- Country: Mali
- Region: Koulikoro Region
- Cercle: Nara Cercle

Population (2009)
  - Total: 34,336
- Time zone: UTC+0 (GMT)

Dogofry is a rural commune in the Cercle of Nara in the Koulikoro Region of south-western Mali. The commune contains 28 villages and in the 2009 census had a population of 34,336. The main village is Ballé.
