= Dilly, Mali =

Dilly
- Commune and village
- Location in Mali
- Coordinates: 14°59′46″N 7°40′7″W
- Country: Mali
- Region: Koulikoro Region
- Cercle: Nara Cercle

Population (2009)
  - Total: 38,965
- Time zone: UTC+0 (GMT)

Dilly is a village and rural commune in the Cercle of Nara in the Koulikoro Region of south-western Mali. The commune includes 63 villages and in the 2009 census had a population of 38,965.
