= Siham Bouhlal =

Moroccan author and translator

Siham Bouhlal, born in 1966 in Casablanca, is a Moroccan translator and poet.

== Professional Background ==
Siham Bouhlal studied at the Sorbonne, where she was a student of Jamel Eddine Bencheikh, translator of One Thousand and One Nights.

In 1999, she defended her doctoral thesis: Translation and Commentary on "The Book of Brocade by Al Washsha." She subsequently published translations of other classical and contemporary Moroccan authors.
