= Fanga =

- Commune and town
- Location in Mali
- Coordinates: 15°00′17″N 10°25′0″W
- Country: Mali
- Region: Kayes Region
- Cercle: Yélimané Cercle

Population (2009 census)
  - Total: 7,753
- Time zone: UTC+0 (GMT)

Fanga is a commune and small town in the Cercle of Yélimané in the Kayes Region of western Mali, near the border of Mauritania. In the 2009 census the commune had a population of 7,753.
