= Mourdiah =

- Village
- Location in Mali
- Coordinates: 14°28′25″N 7°28′10″W
- Country: Mali
- Region: Koulikoro Region
- Cercle: Nara Cercle
- Commune: Niamana
- Elevation: 314 m (1,030 ft)
- Time zone: UTC+0 (GMT)

Mourdiah is a village and seat of the commune of Niamana in the Cercle of Nara in the Koulikoro Region of south-western Mali. The village is 80 km south of Nara, the administrative centre of the cercle, on the Route Nationale 4 (RN4), the road that connects Nara and the Malian capital, Bamako.
