= Battle of Nara (2015) =

Coordinates: 15°18′00″N 7°28′00″W

- Part of Mali War
Date	June 27, 2015
Location	Nara, Mali
Result	Malian victory

Belligerents
Mali	Katiba Macina

Commanders and leaders
Unknown	Abou Yehiya

Casualties and losses
3 killed 5 wounded	9 killed

On June 27, 2015, Katiba Macina militants attacked the Malian military base in Nara, Mali, and briefly captured the town. The attack was repelled by Malian forces.

== Background ==
The Wagadou forest in northern Mali has been a hub of jihadist activity since the beginning of the Mali War, actively hosting encampments from al-Qaeda in the Islamic Maghreb (AQIM), Ansar Dine, and affiliated organizations. Prior to the attack at Nara, the jihadists had been infiltrating the city for several days in preparation for the attack.

== Battle ==
The battle began when shots rang out in the center of Nara around 5am on June 27. Motorcycles and trucks filled with jihadists overran the city, splitting into two groups. One group headed towards the Ould Issa base, where Malian forces were stationed near the Mauritanian border, and another traversed the city. Towards the Ould Issa base, the fighters chanted "Allahu akbar!", and residents stated the fighters were both light and darker skinned. Fighting between Malian forces and the jihadists lasted for four hours. In neighborhoods close by the base, the jihadists shot sporadically at civilian homes, and Malian soldiers nearby urged civilians to stay at home.

While the jihadists controlled the city with no resistance, they were eventually pushed out by Malian soldiers at the Ould Issa base. The jihadists remained in a mosque and a local health center before fleeing. Malian soldiers patrolled the streets for a short while afterwards.

== Aftermath ==
=== Perpetrator ===
A local official in Nara claimed that he had no doubt the attackers were AQIM, due to their clothing. He also remarked that with civilians, the jihadists were largely cheerful. The attack was claimed instead that day by Katiba Macina, a Fulani nationalist jihadist organization affiliated with Ansar Dine. Malian security sources corroborated the Katiba's claim, and accused their second-in-command Abou Yehiya of planning and leading the attack.

=== Casualties ===
Katiba Macina claimed the deaths of seven fighters on July 5, in a statement where they claimed responsibility for the attack a second time. The Malian government stated nine fighters were killed, and three soldiers were killed. The United Nations in their September 2015 report gave a toll of three Malian soldiers killed and five injured, and nine jihadists killed.
