= Chiring Phukan =

Chiring Phukan or Phu-Kon Si-Ring (Ahom: 𑜇𑜤 𑜀𑜨𑜃𑜫 𑜏𑜢 𑜍𑜢𑜂𑜫; Assamese: চিৰিং ফুকন) is an official of the state of Ahom in medieval Assam. He was the worshiper of the Ahoms and the lord of the deodhais (Ahom priest). The third Ahom King Subinphaa divided the noble Ahoms into seven clans or houses and included the Chiring Phukans in the Chiring clan. They conducted all the royal rituals and worship according to Ahom traditions.
