= Niamana, Koulikoro =

Niamana
- Commune
- Location in Mali
- Coordinates: 14°28′25″N 7°28′10″W
- Country: Mali
- Region: Koulikoro Region
- Cercle: Nara Cercle

Area
  - Total: 4,985 km^{2} (1,925 sq mi)

Population (2009 census)
  - Total: 28,166
  - Density: 5.650/km^{2} (14.63/sq mi)
- Time zone: UTC+0 (GMT)

Niamana is a rural commune in the Cercle of Nara in the Koulikoro Region of south-western Mali. The commune has an area of 4,985 km^{2} and contains 39 villages. In the 2009 census the commune had a population of 28,166. The administrative centre is the village of Mourdiah.
