= November 2015 Kidal attack =

Terrorist incident in Mali

- Part of the Mali War
- Location: Mali
- Date: 28 November 2015
- Deaths: 3
- Injuries: 20
- Perpetrator: Ansar Dine (claimed responsibility)

A MINUSMA base in Kidal, northern Mali, was attacked on 28 November 2015. Two Guinean soldiers and a Burkinabe contractor were killed, with 20 more injured. Ansar Dine claimed responsibility for the attack.

== Background ==
Following the Libyan Civil War, Tuaregs fighting in the Libyan Arab Republic's Libyan army fled to northern Mali with weapons. The ensuing insurgency quickly led to the self-declared independence and consequent armed Islamist insurgency by MOJWA and Ansar Dine against the secular MNLA. This led to Operation Serval by France.

The UN base in Kidal was targeted in March as well, resulting in the deaths of two children and a Chadian peacekeeper. In the days preceding the November 2015 attack, the Radisson Blu was attacked in Mali's capital, Bamako. The attack was claimed by three Islamist militant groups — al Qaeda in the Islamic Maghreb, its splinter group, the secular named al Mourabitoun and Massina Liberation Front.

MINUSMA has had over 50 deaths, making it the most fatal UN mission since the 1993-95 UNOSOM II in Somalia.

== Attack ==
According to MINUSMA spokesman Olivier Salgado, the attack happened in Kidal at about 04:00 when "four or five rockets landed inside the base." After the rockets landed, bursts of gunfire occurred. Mortar fire also emanated from inside the camp. At least 2 Guinean troops and a civilian contractor were killed, 14 others were wounded. The camp had received a warning two days before the attack from an unnamed Islamist group. A local government official, Ahmoudene Ag Ikmasse, blamed radical Islamists.

== Responsibility ==
Ansar Dine claimed responsibility for the attack.

== Reactions ==
MINUSMA chief Mongi Hamdi issued a statement that read the attacks "would not dent the determination of the UN to support the Malian people and the peace process, including assisting in the implementation of the Agreement on Peace and Reconciliation in Mali." The UN issued a statement that read: "The members of the Security Council called on the Government of Mali to swiftly investigate this attack and bring the perpetrators to justice, and stressed that those responsible for the attack should be held accountable" and that it may constitute war crimes.
