= Jordi Mareñá =

Spanish footballer

Personal information
- Full name: Jordi Mareñá Gumbau
- Date of birth: 17 May 1991 (age 35)
- Place of birth: Villarreal, Spain
- Height: 1.75 m (5 ft 9 in)
- Position: Midfielder

Team information
- Current team: Langreo
- Number: 14

Youth career
- 2001–2006: Villarreal
- 2006–2010: Castellón

Senior career*
Years	Team	Apps	(Gls)
2010–2013	Castellón	84	(5)
2013–2015	Olímpic Xàtiva	51	(2)
2015–2018	Castellón	94	(2)
2018	Écija	10	(0)
2018–2019	Saguntino	20	(3)
2019–	Langreo	5	(0)
- * Club domestic league appearances and goals as of 20:09, 14 November 2019 (UTC)

Jordi Mareñá Gumbau (born 17 May 1991 in Villarreal, Castellón, Valencian Community) is a Spanish professional footballer who plays for UP Langreo as a midfielder.
