= Kolinbiné River =

River in West Africa

The Kolinbiné River (French: Rivière Kolinbiné) is a river in West Africa. It arises in southern Mauritania and flows south, forming part of the international boundary between Mauritania and Mali. In Mali, it joins the Sénégal River 5 km upstream from the town of Kayes.

The river flows through a number of shallow depressions that fill with water during the short rainy season (July to September). The largest of these is Lake Magui that extends for nearly 30 km in a north–south direction. The lake lies 55 km northeast of Kayes at 14°47′N 11°5′W. The river also fills Lake Doro which lies 34 km east-northeast of Kayes, just north of the RN1 highway at 14°30′45″N 11°7′20″W.
