= Vegas del Genil =

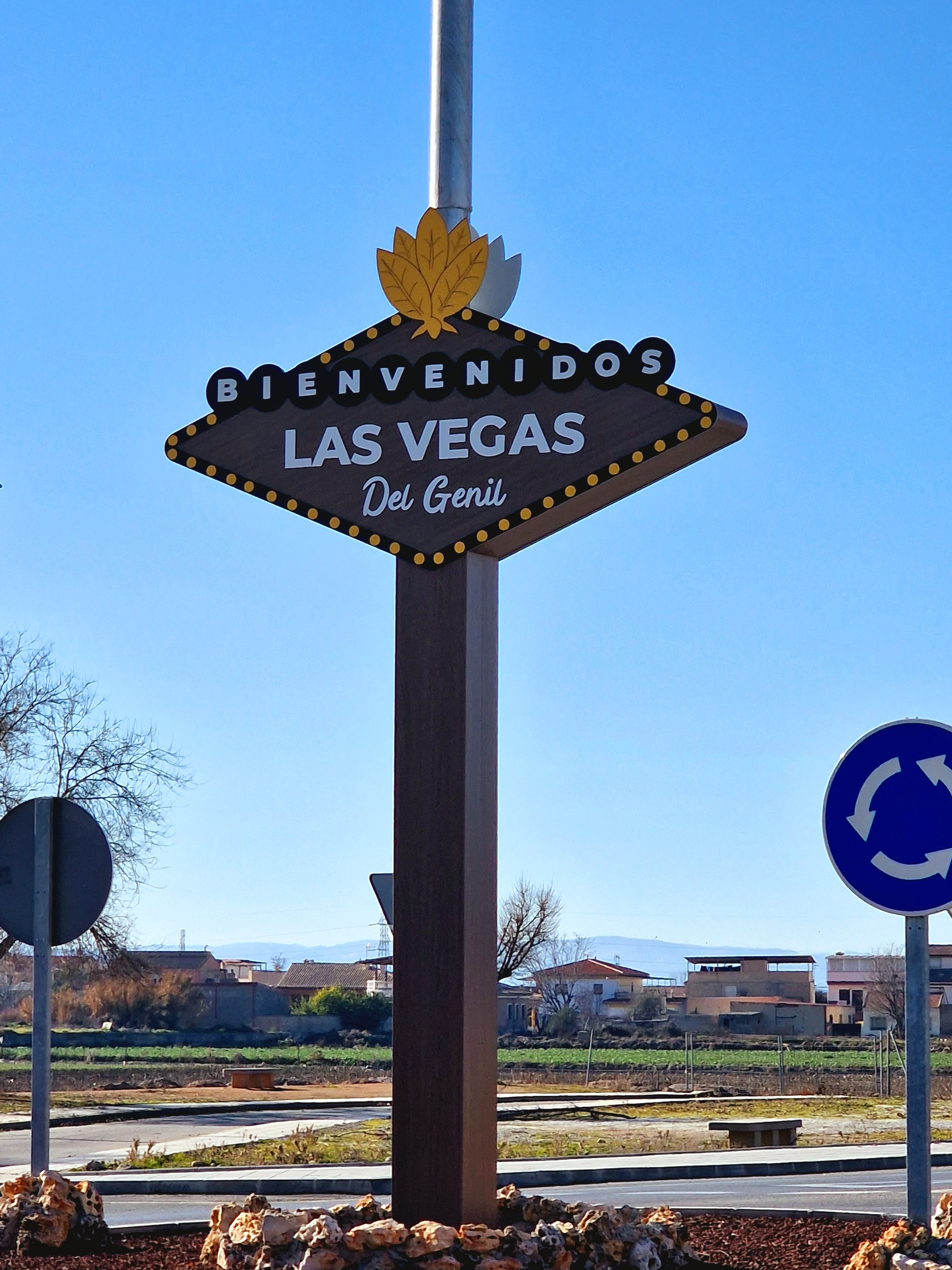

- Flag Coat of arms

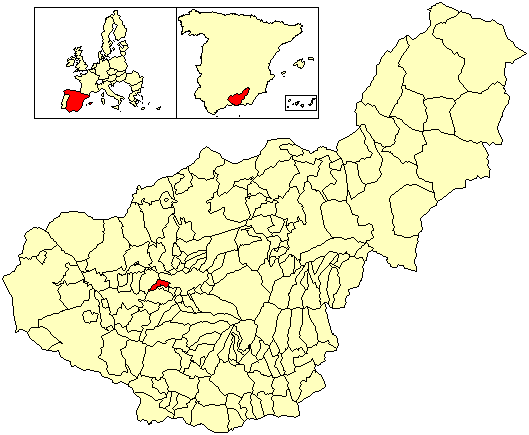

- Location in Spain.
- Coordinates: 37°10′N 3°41′W
- Country: Spain
- Autonomous community: Andalusia
- Province: Granada

Area
  - Total: 14.15 km^{2} (5.46 sq mi)
- Elevation: 617 m (2,024 ft)

Population (2025-01-01)
  - Total: 12,424
  - Density: 878.0/km^{2} (2,274/sq mi)
- Time zone: UTC+1 (CET)
  - Summer (DST): UTC+2 (CEST)
- Website: www.vegasdelgenil.es

Vegas del Genil is a municipality in the province of Granada, Spain. As of 2009, it had a population of 7537 inhabitants.

== Sister city ==
- Ouagadou, Mali

== See also ==
- List of municipalities in Granada
