= Lany Tounka =

- Town
- Location in Mali
- Coordinates: 14°42′54″N 12°3′14″W
- Country: Mali
- Region: Kayes Region
- Cercle: Kayes Cercle
- Commune: Sony
- Time zone: UTC+0 (GMT)

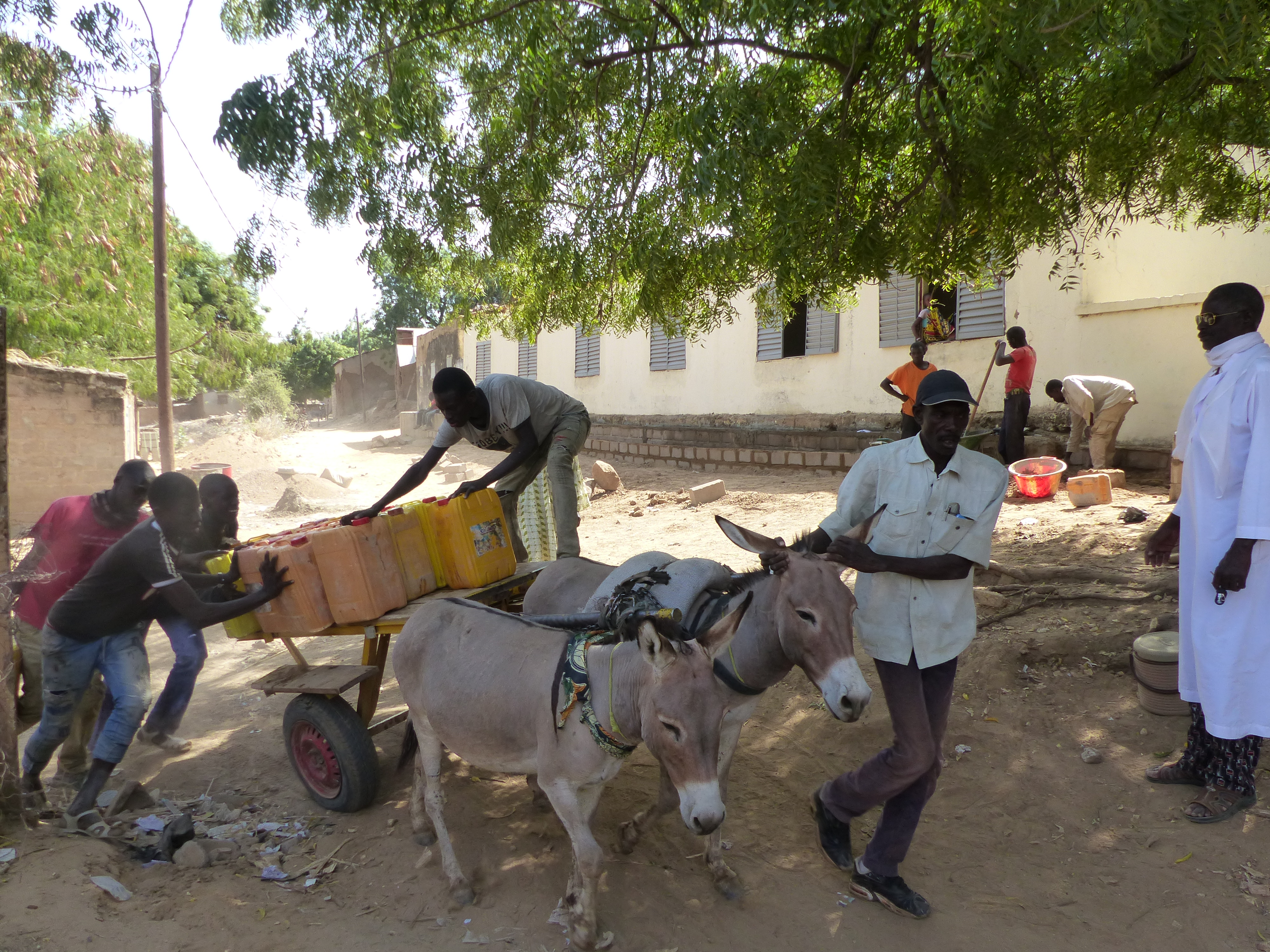
Construction works at a school

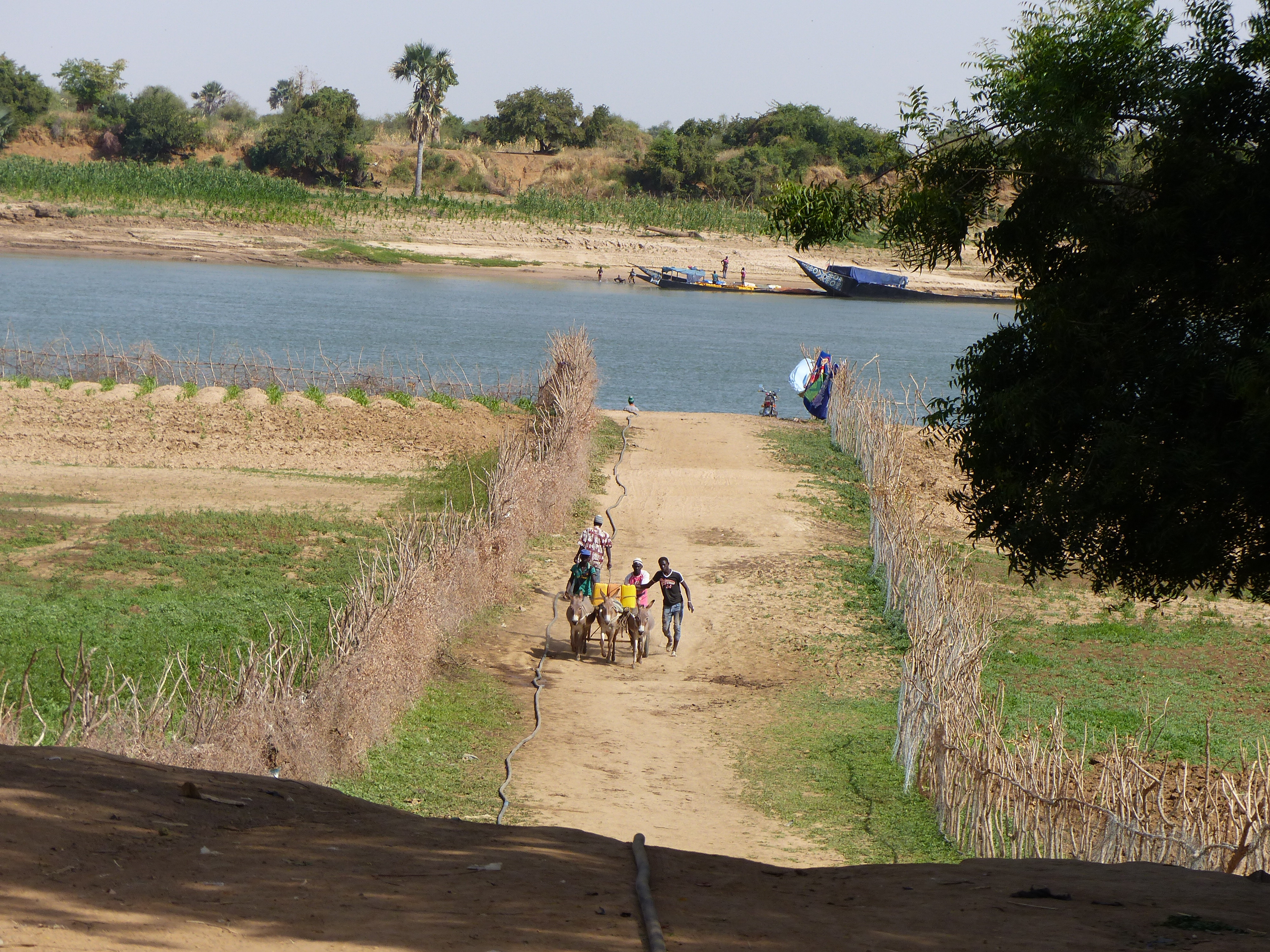
Senegal river near Lany Tounka

Lany Tounka (or Lani Tounka) is a small town and main settlement (chef-lieu) of the commune of Sony in the Cercle of Kayes in the Kayes Region of south-western Mali. The town lies on the south bank of the Senegal River 73 km northwest of Kayes.
