= Bathily =

Bathily is a surname. Notable people with the surname include:

- Abdoulaye Bathily (born 1947), Senegalese politician
- Astan Bathily (born 1999), Ivorian taekwondo practitioner
- Cheick Bathily (born 1982), Malian football player
- Djegui Bathily (born 1977), Senegalese judoka
- Hadama Bathily (born 1985), French football player
- Mohamed Aly Bathily, Malian politician
- Moussa Bathily (also Moussa Yoro Bathily, born 1946), Senegalese teacher, journalist, filmmaker and novelist=
