= Kwala =

Kwala Kata ya Kwala (Swahili)
- Ward
- Kwala Ward
- Country: Tanzania
- Region: Pwani Region
- District: Kibaha District

Government
  - Type: Ward Council
  - Body: Kwala Ward Council

Area
  - Total: 211 km^{2} (81 sq mi)

Population (2022)
  - Total: 6,066
  - Density: 28.7/km^{2} (74.5/sq mi)
- Time zone: UTC+3 (East Africa Time)
- Postal code: 61206

Kwala is a ward in the Pwani Region of Tanzania. It is located in Kibaha District.

== Demographics ==
According to the 2022 census, the population of Kwala is 6,066. There are 3,066 males and 3,000 females. There are 1,580 households with an average household size of 3.8. The ward covers an area of 211 km^{2} (81 sq mi). It has 1,691 buildings in total.

== Administration ==
The ward is made up of Kwala and Mperamumbi villages.

== Economy ==
Kwala is the site of the ambitious Kwala Satellite City project, a substantial development initiative spearheaded by Sino Tan, projected to cost around US$3 billion. The project includes over 200 industries across two phases. These industries will produce various goods such as food products, pharmaceuticals, shoes, clothes, cooking gas, transport materials, and steel. The city will also feature residential buildings, commercial offices, administration blocks, churches, mosques, police stations, and a fire assembly station.

The Kwala Inland Container Depot (ICD), or dry port, is a significant infrastructure development within the Kwala Satellite City. With the ability to accommodate 823 containers daily, its primary purpose is to alleviate congestion at the Port of Dar es Salaam by providing an inland facility for the handling and storage of cargo containers. This strategic move is expected to enhance logistics efficiency and facilitate smoother import and export processes for Tanzania and neighbouring landlocked countries like Uganda, Burundi, Rwanda, the Democratic Republic of Congo (DRC), Zambia, and Malawi. The ICD is integrated with the Tanzania Standard Gauge Railway and the Dar es Salaam-Morogoro highway, optimizing transport and cargo handling.
