= Fallou =

- Commune and village
- Location in Mali
- Coordinates: 14°35′52″N 7°55′55″W
- Country: Mali
- Region: Koulikoro Region
- Cercle: Nara Cercle
- Elevation: 262 m (860 ft)

Population (2009)
  - Total: 30,239
- Time zone: UTC+0 (GMT)

Fallou is a village and rural commune in the Cercle of Nara in the Koulikoro Region of south-western Mali. The commune contains 1000 villages and in the 2009 census had a population of 30,239.
