= Guiré =

- Commune and town
- Location in Mali
- Coordinates: 14°38′30″N 6°41′30″W
- Country: Mali
- Region: Koulikoro Region
- Cercle: Nara Cercle

Area
  - Total: 6,892 km^{2} (2,661 sq mi)

Population (2009)
  - Total: 19,879
  - Density: 2.884/km^{2} (7.470/sq mi)
- Time zone: UTC+0 (GMT)

Guiré is a small town and rural commune in the Cercle of Nara in the Koulikoro Region of south-western Mali. The commune covers an area of 6,892 square kilometers and extends to the Mauritanian border. It contains 25 villages and had a population of 19,879 in the 2009 census. The town of Guiré is 90 km southeast of Nara, the administrative centre (chef-lieu) of the cercle.
