= March 2015 Kidal attack =

Terrorist incident in Mali

- Part of Northern Mali conflict
- Location: Mali
- Date: 8 March 2015
- Deaths: 3
- Injuries: 14

More than 30 rockets and shells struck a MINUSMA base in Kidal, northern Mali, early on 8 March 2015. One United Nations peacekeeper from Chad was killed, as were two Malian children killed when a shell fell on a nearby camp of Tuareg and Arab nomads, according to the UN. Eleven more peacekeepers and three more civilians were reportedly injured. The rockets and shells were apparently launched from both the north and the south of the base. It was not immediately clear who carried out the attack, but Islamist militants active in the area or Tuareg separatists were suspected.

== Background ==
Kidal, where the attack took place, is considered the "cradle" of the Tuareg separatist movement, which seeks to carve out an ethnic homeland called Azawad in northern Mali. Separatists briefly seized control of major cities in the region and declared Azawadi independence in 2012, but their Islamist allies turned on them and evicted them from their strongholds. Months later, the National Movement for the Liberation of Azawad agreed to support Malian territorial unity and renounce the independence of Azawad, although the relationship between Tuareg fighters in the north and the Malian military remained tenuous. France, the former colonial power in Mali, intervened in 2013 to drive out Islamist fighters. The United Nations began taking over peacekeeping duties from French troops in northern Mali later that year, forming MINUSMA as its mission in the West African country.

The day before the rocket attack in Kidal, a gunman opened fire in a bar in Bamako, Mali's capital. The attack killed five, including a Belgian security official working for the European Union. The Islamist group Al-Murabitoun claimed responsibility for the attack, the first of its kind in the southern Malian city.

== Reactions ==
The United Nations Security Council and Secretary-General Ban Ki-moon condemned the attack as "intolerable" and said it violated international law. A UN spokeswoman called the shelling "a terrorist attack of a very complex nature".
