= Nara Cercle =

Coordinates: 15.168461°N 7.290154°W

Nara
- Cercle
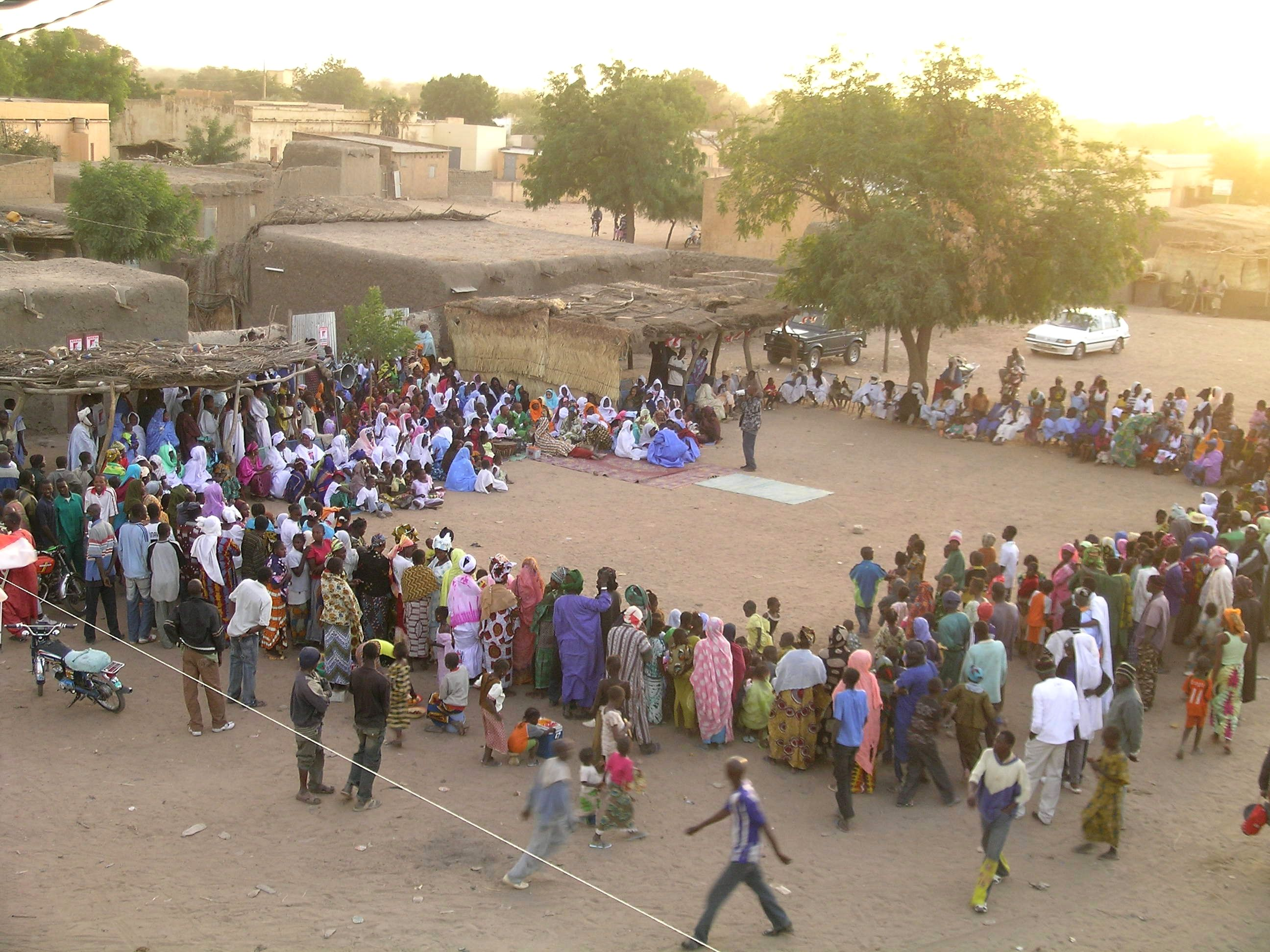

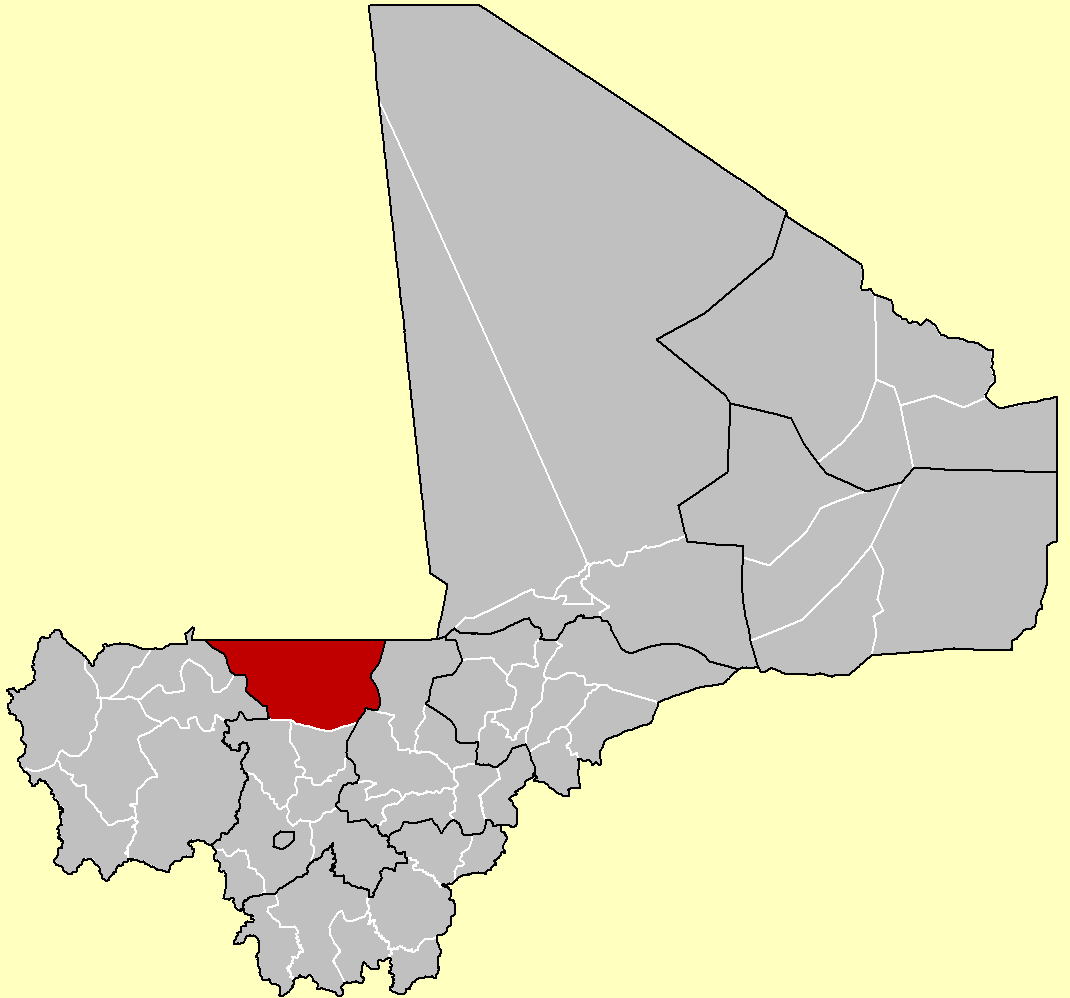
- Location of Nara Cercle in Mali
- Country: Mali
- Region: Koulikoro Region
- Capital: Nara
- Admin HQ (Chef-lieu): Nara

Area
  - Total: 30,000 km^{2} (12,000 sq mi)

Population (2009 census)
  - Total: 242,990
  - Density: 8.1/km^{2} (21/sq mi)
- Time zone: UTC+0 (GMT)

Nara Cercle is an administrative subdivision of the Koulikoro Region of Mali. Its seat is the town of Nara.

Nara Cercle is the northernmost area of Koulikoro Region, and abuts the desert regions of Mauritania to the north. It covers some 30,000 km^{2}, and is home to Bambara and Sarakole (Soninké) peoples, as well as semi-nomadic Maure and Fula peoples, engaged in farming and livestock raising.

== Administrative divisions ==
Nara Cercle is divided into 11 communes:

- Allahina
- Dabo
- Dilly
- Dogofry
- Fallou
- Guénéibe
- Guiré
- Koronga
- Nara
- Niamana
- Ouagadou
