= Yélimané Cercle =

Coordinates: 15°05′N 10°35′W

Yélimané
- Cercle
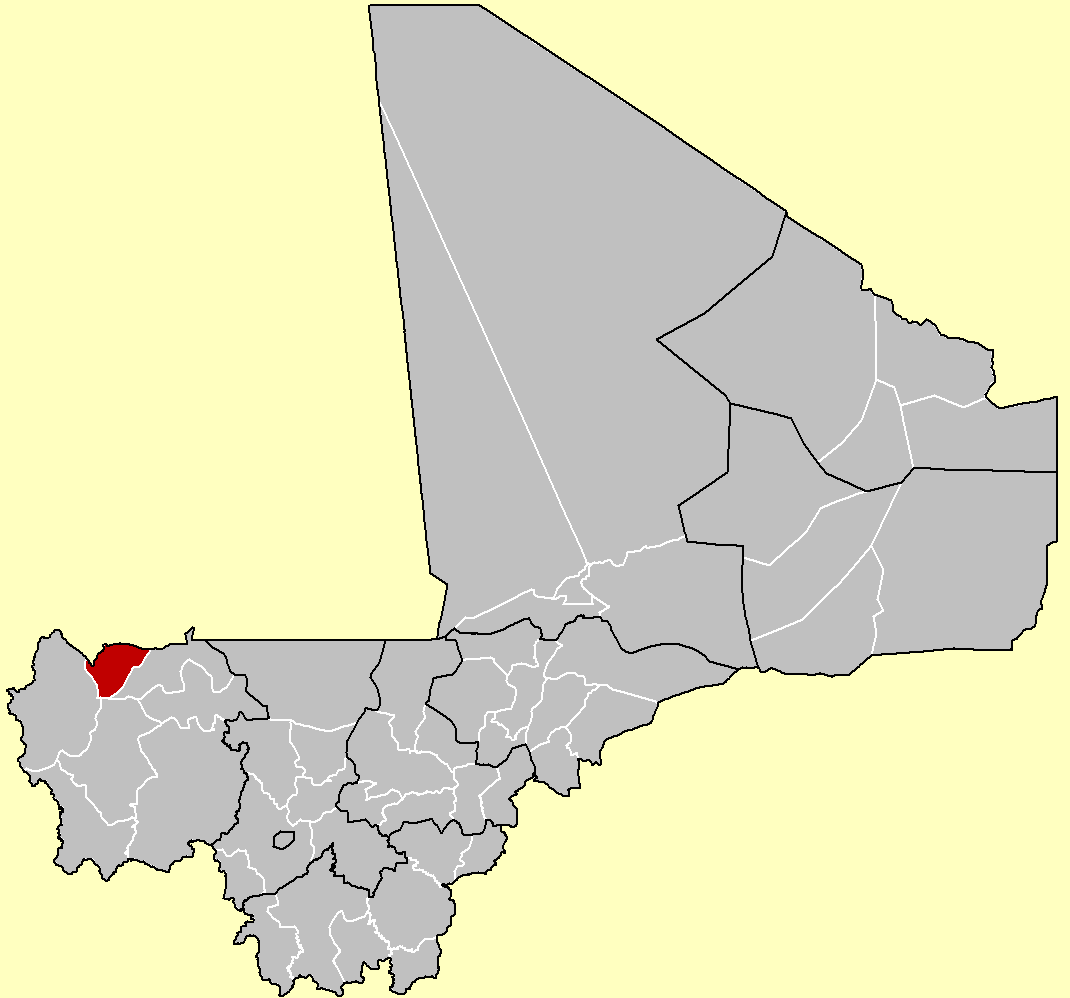
- Location of Yélimané Cercle in Mali
- Country: Mali
- Region: Kayes Region
- Admin HQ (Chef-lieu): Yélimané

Area
  - Total: 5,700 km^{2} (2,200 sq mi)

Population (2009 census)
  - Total: 178,442
  - Density: 31/km^{2} (81/sq mi)
- Time zone: UTC+0 (GMT)

Yélimané Cercle is an administrative subdivision of the Kayes Region of Mali. Its administrative centre (chef-lieu) is the town of Yélimané. In the 2009 census the population of the cercle was 178,442.

Yélimané Cercle is a major center of gold mining.

The cercle is subdivided into 12 communes:

- Diafounou Diongaga
- Diafounou Gory
- Fanga
- Gory
- Guidimé
- Kirané Kaniaga
- Konsiga
- Kremis
- Marekaffo
- Soumpou
- Toya
- Tringa
