= Nara, Mali =

Nara
- Commune and town
- Location in Mali
- Coordinates: 15°10′5″N 7°17′15″W
- Country: Mali
- Region: Koulikoro Region
- Cercle: Nara Cercle

Area
  - Total: 1,300 km^{2} (500 sq mi)

Population (2009 census)
  - Total: 19,793
  - Density: 15/km^{2} (39/sq mi)
- Time zone: UTC+0 (GMT)

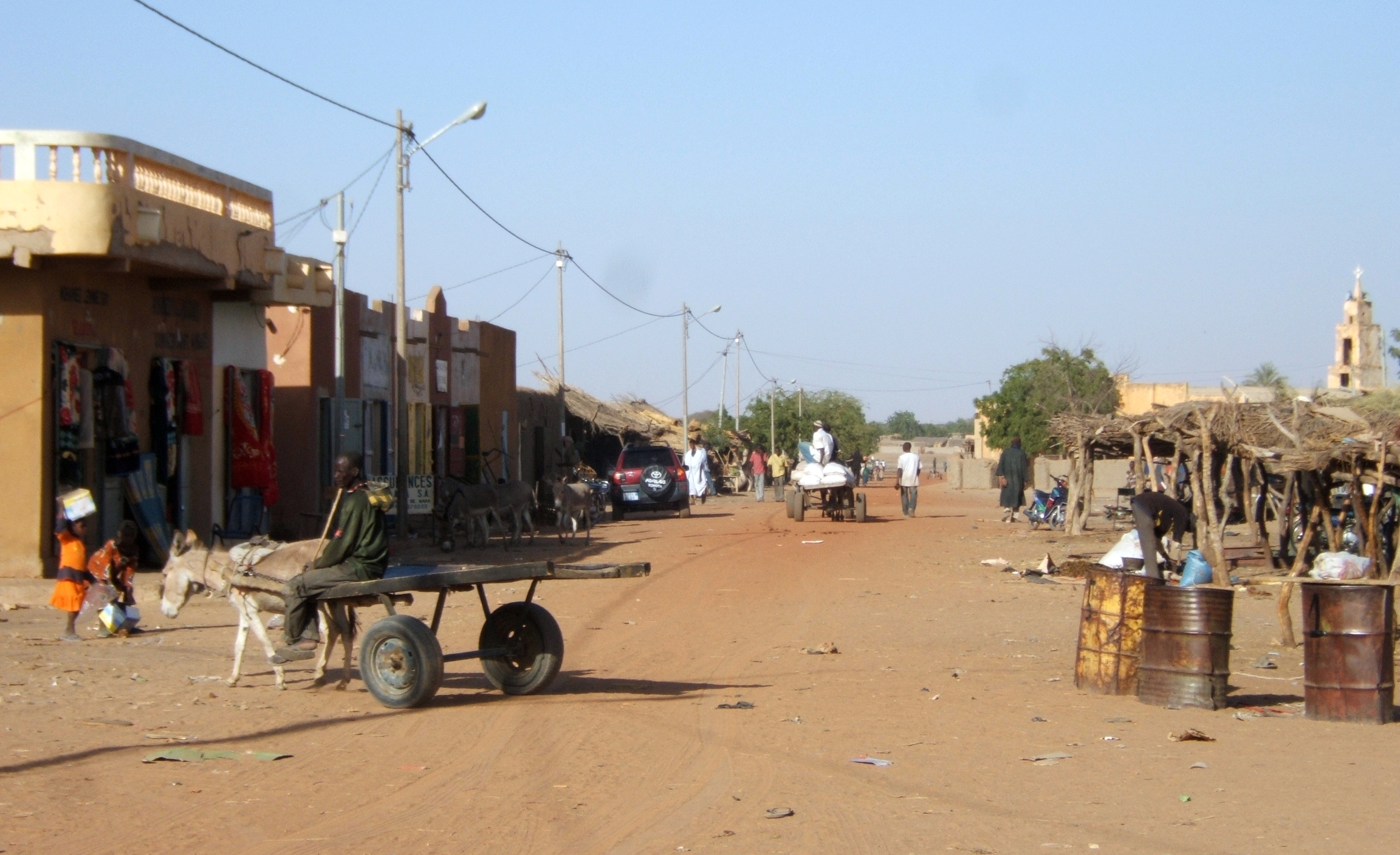
Nara

Nara (Bambara: ߣߊߙߊ tr. Nara) is a town and rural commune in the Koulikoro Region of southwestern Mali. The town is the administrative center of the Nara Cercle. It is about 37 kilometres (23 mi), south of the international border with Mauritania and approximately 374 kilometres (232 mi), by road, northeast of the Malian capital, Bamako.

The rural commune covers an area of 1,300 square kilometres (500 mi^{2}) and includes the town and 16 surrounding villages. In the 2009 census the commune had a population of 19,793.

== Climate ==
Climate data for Nara, Mali (1961–1990)
Month	Jan	Feb	Mar	Apr	May	Jun	Jul	Aug	Sep	Oct	Nov	Dec	Year
Mean daily maximum °C (°F)	31.3 (88.3)	34.5 (94.1)	37.3 (99.1)	39.7 (103.5)	41.0 (105.8)	39.2 (102.6)	34.9 (94.8)	33.1 (91.6)	34.9 (94.8)	37.3 (99.1)	35.3 (95.5)	31.4 (88.5)	35.8 (96.4)
Daily mean °C (°F)	23.4 (74.1)	25.8 (78.4)	28.5 (83.3)	31.4 (88.5)	33.4 (92.1)	32.6 (90.7)	29.5 (85.1)	28.0 (82.4)	28.8 (83.8)	29.7 (85.5)	26.8 (80.2)	23.5 (74.3)	28.5 (83.3)
Mean daily minimum °C (°F)	14.6 (58.3)	17.3 (63.1)	20.2 (68.4)	24.1 (75.4)	26.7 (80.1)	26.6 (79.9)	24.2 (75.6)	23.3 (73.9)	23.4 (74.1)	22.4 (72.3)	18.5 (65.3)	15.1 (59.2)	21.4 (70.5)
Average precipitation mm (inches)	0.3 (0.01)	0.1 (0.00)	0.7 (0.03)	3.4 (0.13)	9.2 (0.36)	43.9 (1.73)	113.6 (4.47)	139.8 (5.50)	65.0 (2.56)	11.3 (0.44)	3.4 (0.13)	0.1 (0.00)	390.8 (15.36)
Average rainy days	0.1	0.1	0.2	1.1	3.7	7.2	11.8	13.4	9.0	2.4	0.2	0.1	49.3
Mean monthly sunshine hours	261.2	239.2	262.5	252.6	252.4	226.0	232.0	250.8	242.6	264.1	269.9	251.2	3,004.5
Source: NOAA
