= Koundian =

Koundian may refer to several places in Africa:

== Guinea ==
- Koundian, Guéckédougou
- Koundian, Kankan
- Koundian, Kissidougou
- Koundian, Mandiana
- Koundian, Siguiri

== Mali ==
- Koundian, Mali
