= Bafoulabé =

- Commune and town
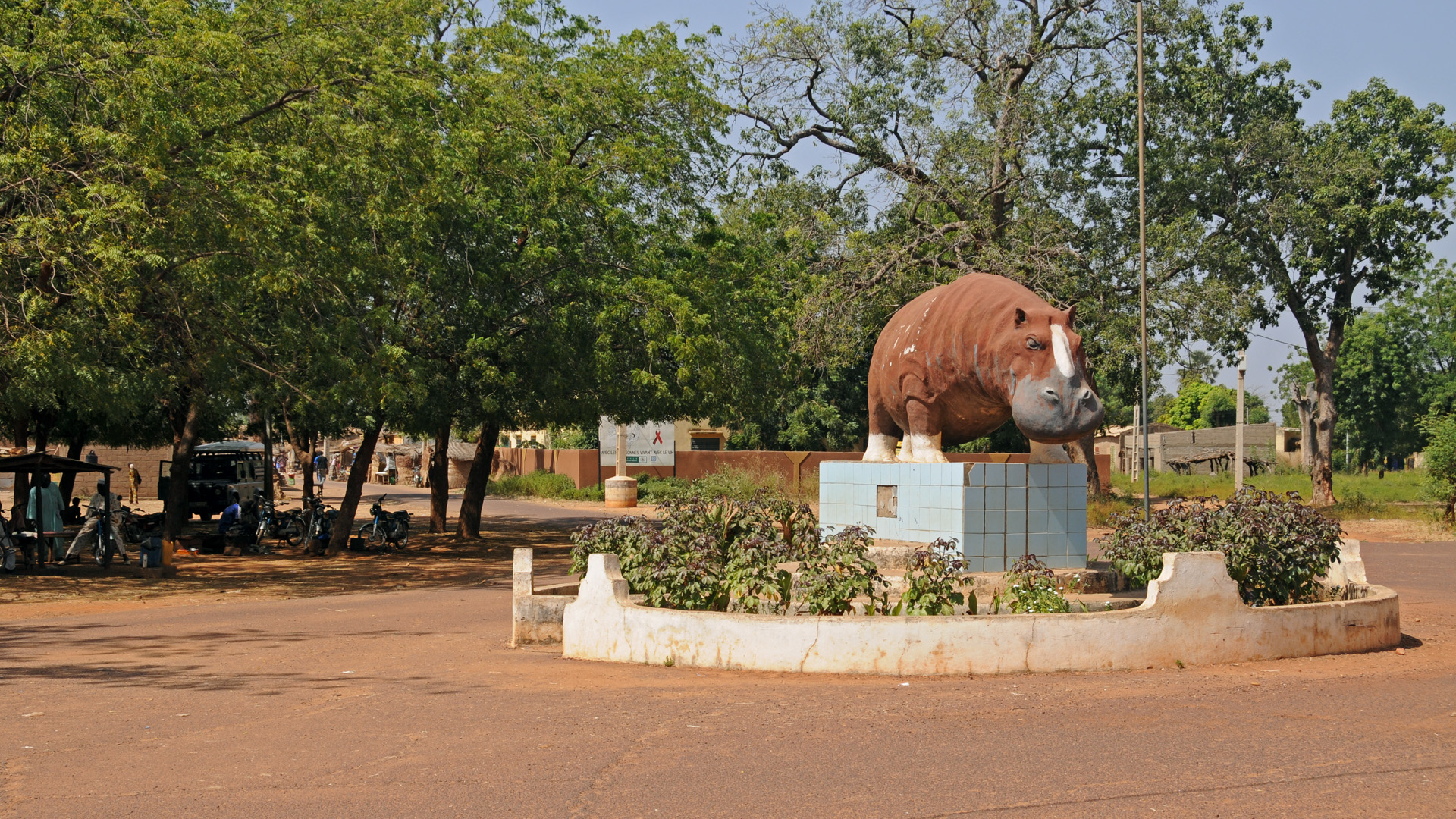

- Location in Mali
- Coordinates: 13°48′30″N 10°49′50″W
- Country: Mali
- Region: Kayes Region
- Cercle (district): Bafoulabé Cercle

Government
  - Mayor: Makan Diakité (CNID)
- Elevation: 83 m (272 ft)

Population (2009 census)
  - Total: 19,955

Bafoulabé is a town and rural commune in south-western Mali. It is located in the Region of Kayes at the confluence of the Bafing and Bakoy rivers which join to become the Sénégal River. Bafoulabé is the capital of the Cercle of Bafoulabé, which in 1887 was the first Cercle to be created in Mali.

== History ==
Bafoulabé was captured by French colonial forces under Joseph Gallieni in 1880. It became, in 1887, the center of the first cercle put in place in the French Sudan, and later the site of one of the earliest colonial schools, where Fily Dabo Sissoko and Mamadou Konaté would study.

== Local administration ==
Until the 1996 law creating communes, Bafoulabé Commune was an arrondissement. While now deprecated, the commune retains the same boundaries, extending far beyond the town of Bafoulabé, its seat (chef-lieu). Bafoulabé is also the seat of the larger Bafoulabé Cercle. Apart from the town, there are 28 villages, official rural subdivisions within the Commune. It is a Rural Commune, meaning it is subdivided into villages, in contrast to the smaller Urban Commune, divided into urban Quarters. Commune affairs are directed by an elected Commune Council (conseil communal) of 23 members and a Commune executive (bureau communal) of the elected Mayor and three adjutants. The executive is tasked with carrying out the directives voted on by the Council. National policies are carried out by a Sub-Prefect (sous préfet), who also carries out certain Council directives over the local arms or national bodies.

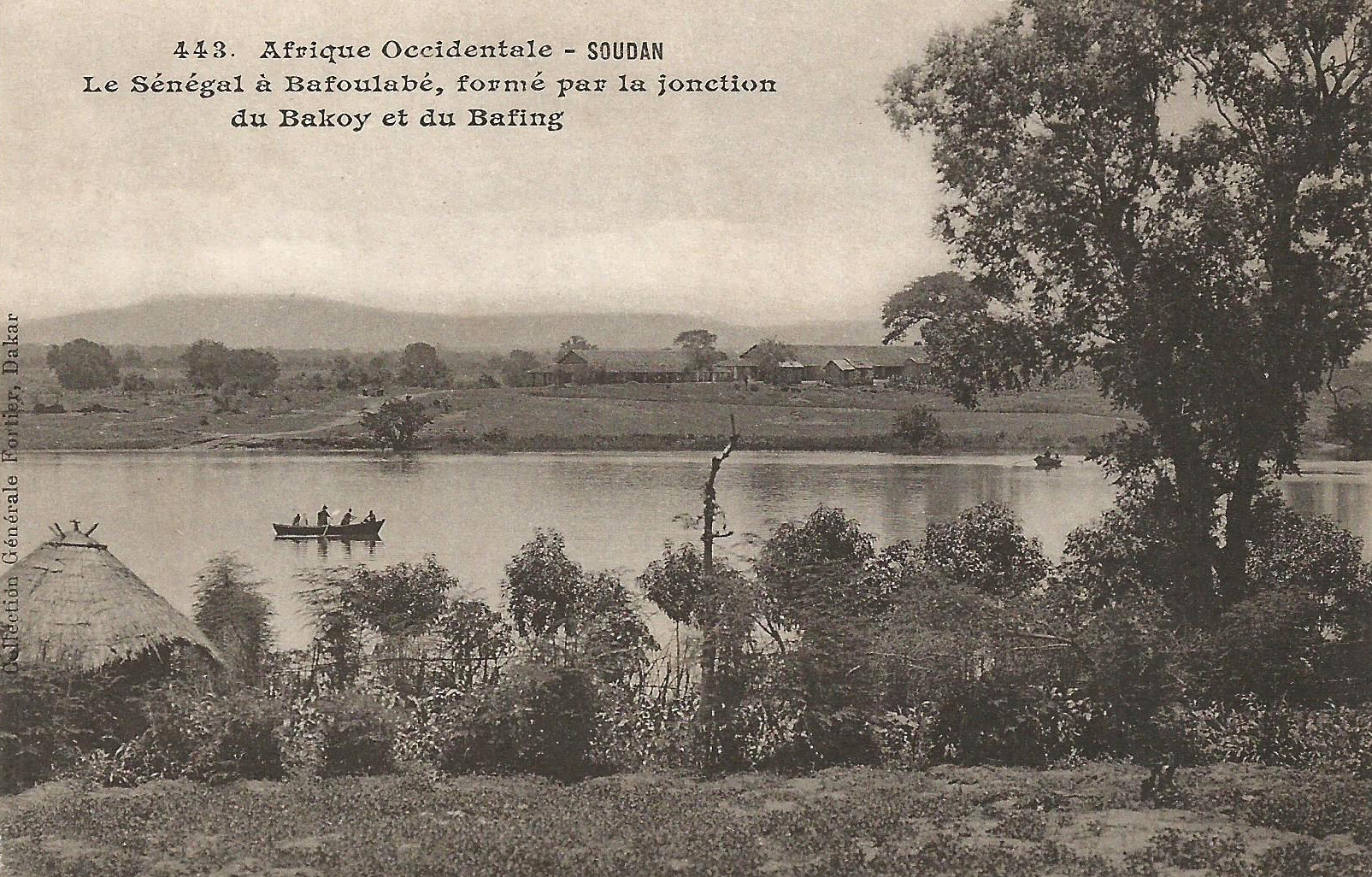
The Senegal River at Bafoulabe during the colonial era

== Geography and climate ==
At Bafoulabé, the Bafing and Bakoy rivers meet to form the Sénégal River. In Bambara, Bafoulabé means "meeting of two rivers". The Manantali hydroelectric dam, the largest in Mali, and its reservoir, Lake Manantali, are located 90 km to the south-east of Bafoulabé on the Bafing River.

Extending across two banks of the Senegal River, the Commune is bounded to the east by Kontéla Commune and Oualia Commune, to the north Tomora Commune and Sidibéla Commune, to the south by Mahina Commune and to the west by Diamou Commune of Kayes Cercle. The climate is Sahelian. The rainy season lasts from June to October, and the average annual precipitation is 900 mm (~35.43 in). Hot year-round by temperate standards, the hot season lasts from roughly February to June, and the cooler season runs from roughly November to February. The maximum annual temperature may reach 41 °C (105.8 °F) in the shade.

=== Vegetation ===
The Sahelian landscape of the Commune is made up of grasslands punctuated by trees, often large. These include baobabs, rônier palms, raffia palms (from which textiles, rope, and palm oil are made), shea trees (from which shea butter is made), duguto trees, and néré trees.

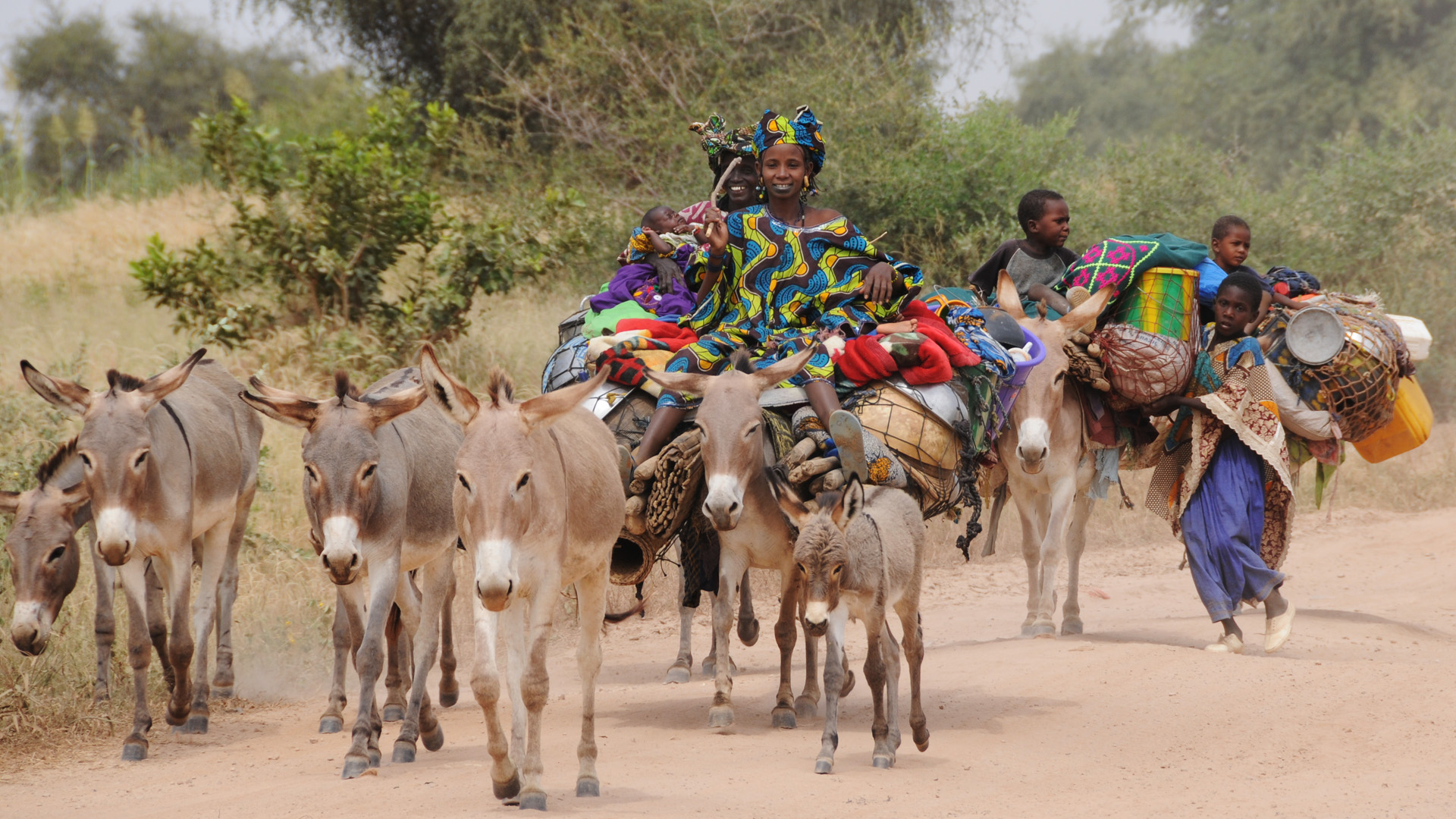

== Population and culture ==
Bafoulabé had a population of 16,670 in 1998 and 19,955 in 2009. Prior to colonialism, Bafoulabé had been a thriving commercial center. The construction of the Dakar Bamako railway in the early 20th century bypassed the river trade, making Kayes the center of commercial activity in the area. The town's population consists primarily of Khassonkés, Malinkés, Soninkés and Fulas. Fily Dabo Sissoko, writer and one of the founding fathers of independent Mali, was a native of Bafoulabé. The Festival dansa/diawoura, a festival of traditional dance, took place in Bafoulabé from April 8 to April 10, 2005.

The legend of Mali Sadio, which concerns a hippopotamus who develops a friendship with a young lady called Sadio, takes place in Bafoulabé.

== Sister cities ==
- Lesquin, France
