= Mali Sadio =

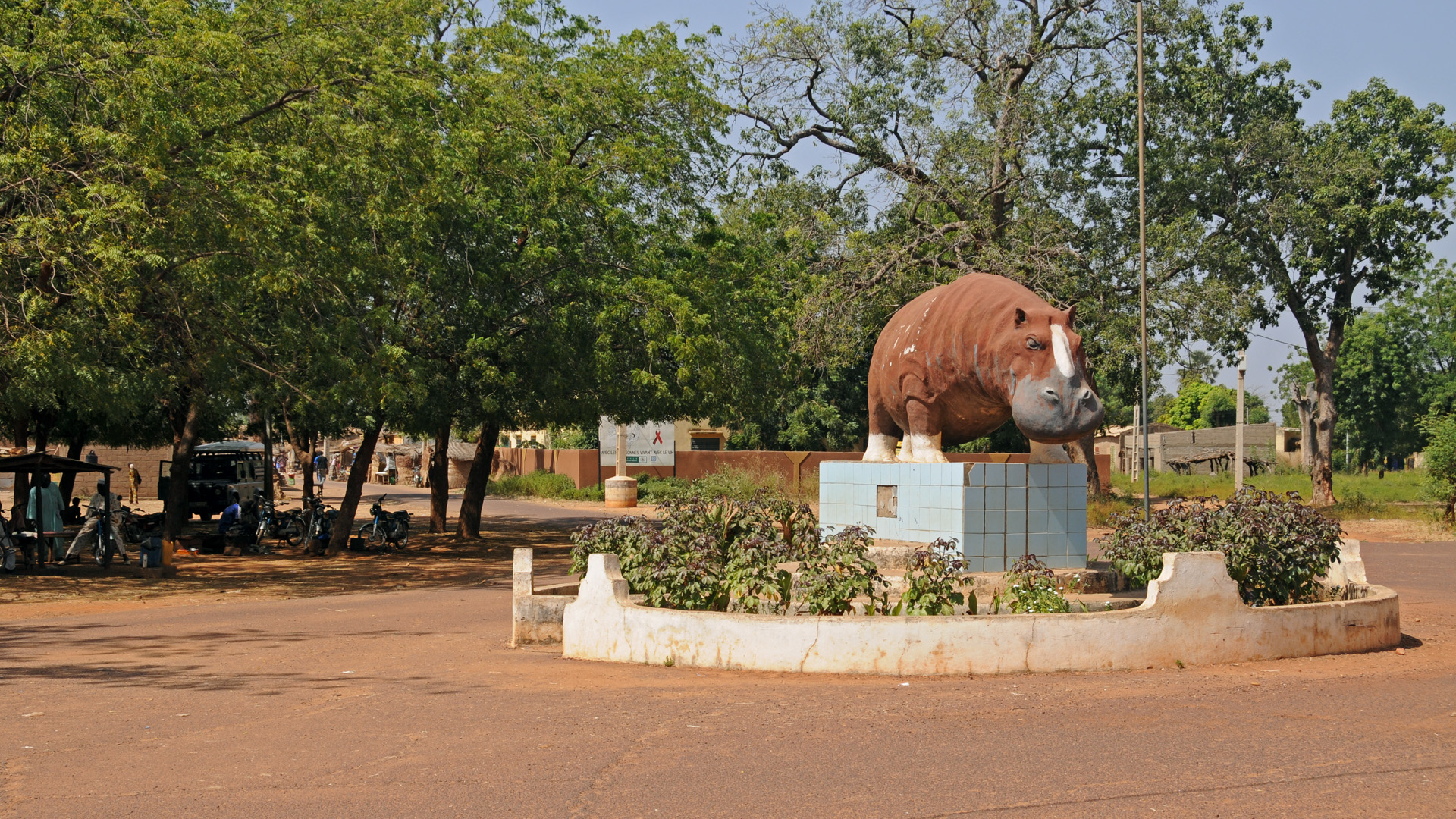
A statue of Mali Sadio, in the central square of Bafoulabé

The legend of Mali Sadio takes place around the city of Bafoulabé, Mali. It is presented as a factual story transmitted by oral tradition, although it has had several changes applied to it over time. There are several versions of the legend.

== The legend ==
Generally, the story mentions a hippopotamus, which is called “mali” in Bambara, which carries on a friendship with a young lady called Sadio. In other versions, it is the hippopotamus that is called Mali Sadio (or just Sadio), a term which could have its origins in the Kassonké term cajo (Tchatcho in Bambara), which means “an animal of two colours”. This term tchatcho is also used in a pejorative sense to mean a woman who has bleached her skin.

In the end, the hippopotamus was killed. According to certain versions, it was killed by a local who, having fallen in love with the young lady, became jealous of the friendship. According to other versions, it is a French colonist called Cauchon who killed the animal.

This legend is told and sung by griots and has been recorded by several Malian musicians. In 2005, the Dansa-Diawoura Festival ended with a day dedicated to the legend. That allowed several griots to present their versions. After the event, Doumbi Fakoly wrote a book that attempted to unify the many disparate versions of the legend. The Mali Sadio story is also common to the Mamprussi and Dagomba people of northern Ghana, although is taken from the viewpoint of the one they claimed killed him, a local hunter called Tohadzie.

== Musical references ==
- Mali Sadio by Toumani Diabaté et Mangala Camara
- Mali Sadio by the Mandekalou ensemble (formed by Salif Keïta, Kouyaté Sory Kandia, Mory Kanté, Sidiki Diabaté, Sékou Batrou Kouyaté, Demba Camara, Kassé Mady Diabaté, Kandia Kouyaté, Sira Mory Diabaté, Kadé Diawara and Kémo Condé)
- Mali Sadio by Habib Koité
- Mali Sadio by Mali Blues Trio
- Mali Sadio by Kouyaté Sory Kandia
- Mali Sadio by Cheick Niang Guitariste, Wally B. Seck and Youssou Dieng

== References in literature ==
- 2006 : Mali-Sadio, l’hippopotame de Bafulabé, by Doumbi Fakoly, preface by Cheick Oumar Sissoko, published by Menaibuc, Paris ISBN 2911372859
- 2005 : Sadio et Maliba l'hippopotame, by Aboubacar Eros Sissoko, published by L'Harmattan, Paris ISBN 274759131X
