= Tomora =

- Commune
- Location in Mali
- Coordinates: 14°15′0″N 10°27′50″W
- Country: Mali
- Region: Kayes Region
- Cercle: Bafoulabé Cercle
- Principal town: Oussoubidiagna

Population (2009 census)
  - Total: 32,527
- Time zone: UTC+0 (GMT)

Tomora is a commune in the Cercle of Bafoulabé in the Kayes Region of south-western Mali. The administrative centre (chef-lieu) is Oussoubidiagna, a small town with around 4,000 inhabitants. The commune contains over thirty small villages. In the 2009 census it had a population of 32,527. Most of the inhabitants of Tomora are Khassonkés, with a minority of Soninke, Fulani and Malinke engaged mostly in farming.

== History and administration ==
The Borough of Oussoubidiangna was created in 1959 by merging the townships of Tomora, Sidibéla, Kontéla, Soroma and Diaye. However, by Law No. 96 - 059/AN- RM of November 4, 1996 thirty seven villages in the Borough of Oussoubidiangna formed the current rural commune of Tomora. The management of its affairs is entrusted to a council of twenty-three members and a communal office consists of a Mayor and three assistant deputies. The mayor, currently Hamet Sissoko, and his deputies are responsible for the implementation of the decisions of the municipal council, and a prefect is chosen to represent to commune as a state representative and is responsible for advisory support to the municipal authorities.

== Geography and climate ==
The commune of Tomora is located 100 km north of Bafoulabé. It is bounded on the east by the rural commune of Diallan, north by Diakon, south by the commune of Bafoulabé and west by the municipality of Sidibéla, and to the south-east by Kontéla. Tomora is located on the foothills of the Fouta Djallon, and the commune has a topography characterized by a multitude of hills with narrow plains between them. The climate is Sahelian, typically hot, with rainfall varying from 700 to 900 mm per year with three main seasons: dry (March, April, May and June), Rainy (July–October) and cold (November–February). No permanent watercourse traverses the commune so for water the inhabitants have had to resort to drilling wells and collecting water from further afield given that there is no permanent piped water supply.

The Nando Peretti Foundation, backed with funding from the AECI (International Co-operation Spanish Agency), by the ECGO (Humanitarian Aid Office, European Commission) and private financial supporters and institutions such as the Barcelona Provincial Council, the Catalan Fund for Development and La Caixa Bank have been involved in improving water supply in the commune, particularly in the village of Madalaya and the surrounding villages of Tifé, Bougountinti, Mansadji, Diafan, Yahinane, Tamratinti, Bdiandiana, Gao and Diba. They have also instructed the local people to maintain the borehole pump and distribution system to obtain the best advantage of fresh water availability to provide for some 8000 people in the local area, including 1360 in Madalaya and rest in the surrounding villages. At present a yield of 40 m^{3} per day is supplied by 10 traditional wells, but the wells are shallow and the aquifers unfavorable, less than 20 m deep while the drill hole depths range between 43 and 80 m.

However the variety of soils from gravelly or silty to sandy loam and sandy clay are suitable in many parts for agriculture. A number of plants inhabit the commune including gum, baobab, jujube, Kungo sira and other thorny species and the trees are plants are often used for firewood, lumber, and for medical purposes.

== Economy ==
The economy is based on agriculture, harvesting and trade and crafts. The people of Tomora farm sorghum, maize, beans and cassava and rely on groundnuts as cash crops. They also grow vegetables such as onion, tomato, okra, eggplant, squash and peppers. Pastoral farming is particularly important, especially for food supply and saving money for household food bills. Shea butter, monkey bread, are also produced and are also intended primarily for consumption while the wine of palmyra and raffia is a source of income for people.

Making mats and baskets is also a local custom and blacksmiths, shoemakers, potters and weavers are involved in this crafts sector. They sell their products at the weekly market in the main town of Oussoubidiagna.

== Religion ==
In the 2000s, the commune has been subjects to visits by Christian missionaries. The United Bible Society in coordination with the Norwegian Protestant Mission are of major note in this respect and educated several villagers in the region in 2007 in English. On February 25, 2008 a United Bible Society/NPM convoy of seven vehicles left Bamako to travel to Oussoubidiagna under the guidance of Jacques Dembele, General Secretary of the Bible Society in Mali and their translation correspondent, Youssouf Dembele. Most of missionaries were Norwegian and affiliated with the Norwegian Protestant Mission.Hunters and musicians and dancing girls and horses turned the visit into a celebration which is a Khassonké custom at important events. The Bible Society had been responsible for spreading Christianity in the area by establishing the Khassonké New Testament, translated by those they had educated in English into the Khassonké.
