= List of rivers of Mali =

This is a list of rivers in Mali. This list is arranged by drainage basin, with respective tributaries indented under each larger stream's name.

== Atlantic Ocean ==
- Senegal River
  - Falémé River
  - Karakoro River
  - Kolinbiné River
    - Sanaba River
  - Bafing River
  - Bakoy River
    - Baoulé River
      - Badinko River
    - Kokoro River

== Gulf of Guinea ==
- Volta River (Ghana)
  - Black Volta (Burkina Faso)
    - Sourou River
- Niger River
  - Dallol Bosso (Niger)
    - Vallée de l'Azaouak
      - Vallée de l'Ahzar
  - Vallée du Tilemsi
  - Diaka River
  - Bani River
    - Koni River
    - Banifing River
    - Bagoé River
      - Nifing River
      - Banifing River
      - Kankélaba River
      - Bafini River
    - Baoulé River
      - Banifing River
      - Banifing River (Bafing River)
      - Dégou River
  - Canal du Sahel
  - Faya River
  - Sankarani River
    - Ouassoulou River (Bale River)
  - Fié River
