= Diakaba =

- Village
- Location in Mali
- Coordinates: 13°19′50″N 10°46′47″W
- Country: Mali
- Region: Kayes Region
- Cercle: Bafoulabé Cercle
- Commune: Diokeli

Population
  - Ethnicities: Jakhanke people
- Time zone: UTC+0 (GMT)

Diakaba, also known as Jagha, Diakhaba, Diakha-Bambukhu, or Diakha on the Bafing is a village in western Mali. Founded by Al-Hajj Salim Suwari, it was historically a major center of Islamic scholarship and the gold trade in the Bambouk region. The town came under the control of the Denianke kingdom in the late 16th century.
