= Goundara =

- Village
- Location in Mali
- Coordinates: 14°2′22″N 10°22′0″W
- Country: Mali
- Region: Kayes Region
- Cercle: Bafoulabé Cercle
- Commune: Kontela
- Time zone: UTC+0 (GMT)

Goundara is a village and principal settlement (chef-lieu) of the commune of Kontela in the Cercle of Bafoulabé in the Kayes Region of southwestern Mali.
