= Karounga Keïta =

Malian footballer, coach, and official (1941–2023)

Karounga Keïta (1941 – 5 March 2023) was a Malian football official, coach and player in France and Mali, and president of one of Mali's two largest club sides Djoliba AC.

== Biography ==
Keïta was born in Toukoto, Mali on September 22, 1941. Keïta played for former Bamako football club Sport Afrique in the late 1950s. When Mali gained independence, the football leagues were reorganised, and Sport Afrique was merged with Foyer du Soudan to form Djoliba AC. Keïta played with the new club from their creation in 1960 to 1962, when he traveled to France to pursue a law degree from the University of Bordeaux. While in Bordeaux he was recruited to play for local professional side Girondins de Bordeaux in 1963. He remained as a striker in the French top flight until 1969, making appearances for the Malian National team. He then returned to Mali in 1972, and became coach of his former club.

In 2005, he became Vice President of the Malian Football Federation, the nation's football governing body, and was elected president of Djoliba AC in 1990. Keïta was in 2009 re-elected President of Djoliba to a four-year term.

Keïta died on 5 March 2023, at the age of 81.
