= Tigana, Mali =

Tigana
- Town
- Location in Mali
- Coordinates: 14°16′N 10°46′W
- Country: Mali
- Region: Kayes Region
- Cercle: Bafoulabé Cercle
- Commune: Sidibela
- Time zone: UTC+0 (GMT)

Tigana is a small town and principal settlement of the commune of Sidibela in the Cercle of Bafoulabé in the Kayes Region of south-western Mali.
