= Toukoto =

- Commune and town
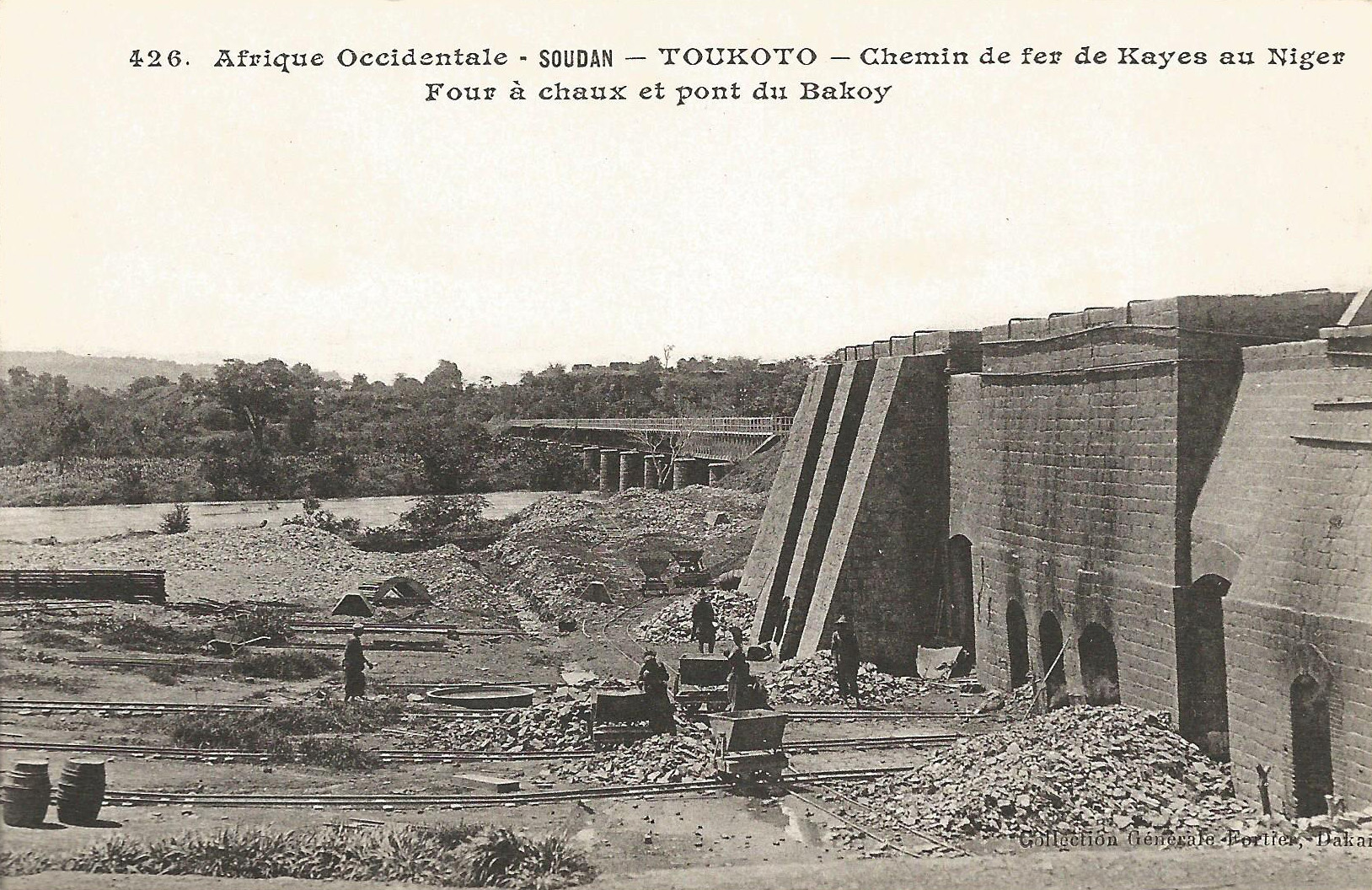
- Toukoto Bakoy.jpg

- Location in Mali
- Coordinates: 13°27′0″N 9°52′45″W
- Country: Mali
- Region: Kayes Region
- Cercle: Kita Cercle

Population (2009)
  - Total: 10,020
- Time zone: UTC+0 (GMT)

Toukoto is a small town and commune near the confluence of the Bakoy and Baloué rivers in the Cercle of Kita in the Kayes Region of south-western Mali. As well as the town of Toukoto, the commune includes 5 other villages. In the 2009 census the commune had a population of 10,020.
