= Bambouk =

Territory in Senegal and Mali

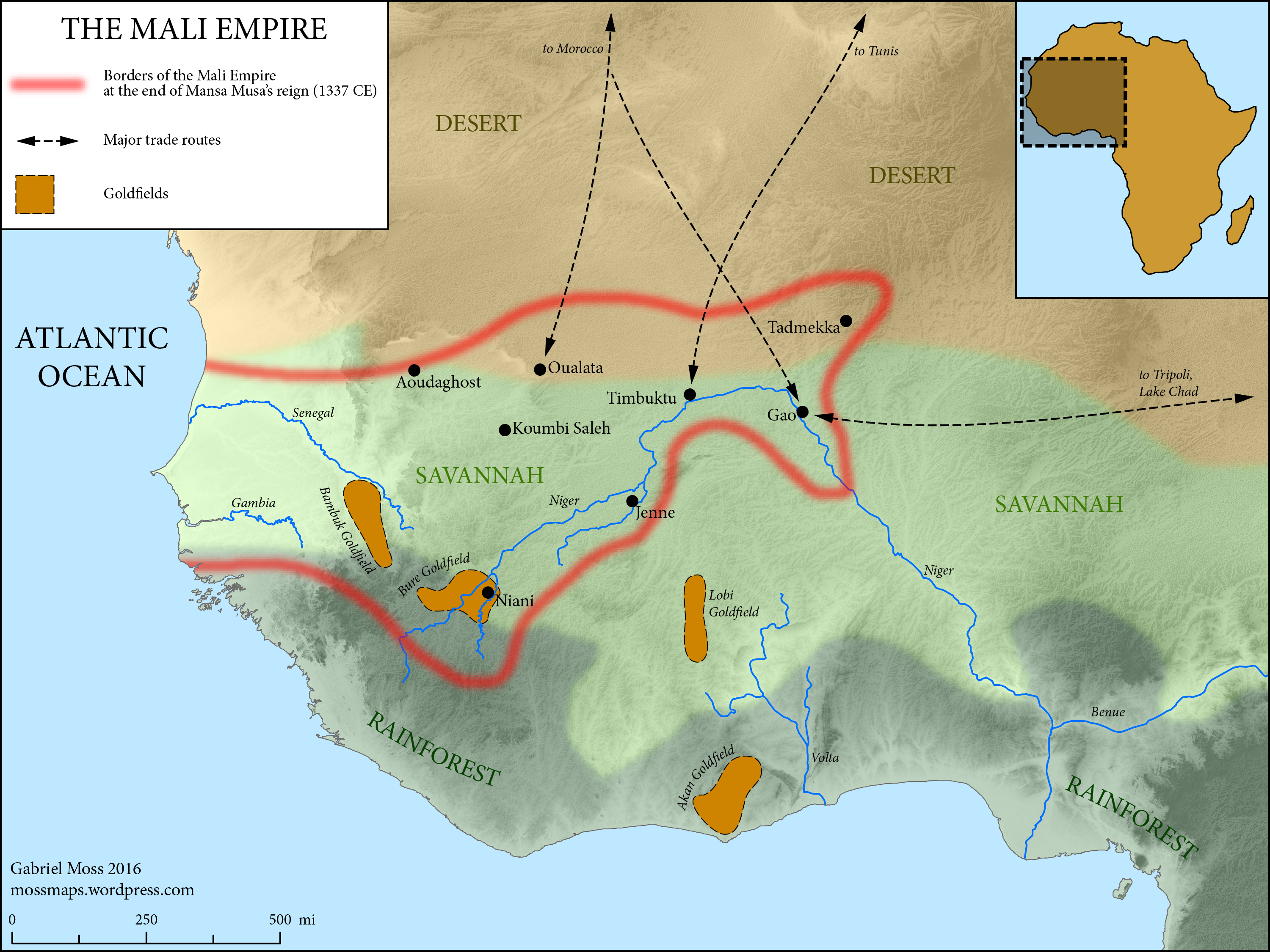
The Mali Empire in 1337, including the location of the Bambuk, Bure, Lobi, and Akan Goldfields

Bambouk (sometimes Bambuk or Bambuhu) is a traditional name for the territory in eastern Senegal and western Mali, encompassing the Bambouk Mountains on its eastern edge, the valley of the Faleme River and the hilly country to the east of the river valley. It was a formally described district in French Sudan, but in 1895, the border between French Sudan and Senegal was moved to the Faleme River, placing the western portion of the district within Senegal. The term is still used to designate the region, but there is no formal administrative area with that name.

Bambouk is primarily home to the Malinké people, and a distinctive dialect of the Maninkakan language is spoken there.

== History ==
According to Martin Meredith, the Carthaginians used Berber nomads to establish a packhorse trade route across the Sahara between Lixus and "the goldfields of Bambuk in the Senegal River valley roughly 6th century BC to 2nd century BC."

The Diakhanke established Diakhaba and became Muslim clerics for the Malinke chiefs after Bambuk was conquered by the Mali Empire in the 13th century. According to Levtzion, "From their centre in Bambuk, the Diakhanke spread to Bondu, Kedougou, and Futa Djallon and established new communities such as Niokhol and Dantilia – in order to secure a monopoly over the trade with the Europeans."

The Portuguese reached Bambouk around 1550, but were killed off, either by each other or by the locals. The French built Fort Saint Pierre on the Falémé in 1714, and two trading posts in Bambouk in 1724. The trading posts were abandoned in 1732 and the fort in 1759. Another French post was established in 1824, but abandoned in 1841.

The area was sparsely populated with a series of largely autonomous villages, and the mountainous terrain made it an ideal refuge. These villages, however, were rarely able to unify for mutual protection, and so were often prey for more powerful nearby states such as Khasso and Bundu in the 18th and 19th centuries, before becoming a part of French Sudan. Today, Bambouk mostly lies with the Kéniéba Cercle.

== Gold ==
Arab geographers referred to Bambouk, Bouré, Lobi and Ashante gold fields as Wangara. According to Levtzion there were, "...three principal goldfields, besides others of lesser importance: Bambuk, between the Senegal and the Faleme rivers; Bure on the Upper Niger; and the Akan goldfields near the forest of the present republics of Ghana and the Ivory Coast." He further states it may have been the "island of gold or Wangara...where alluvial gold was collected." "Wasteful methods reduced the productivity of the goldfields...in the eleventh or twelfth century, the Sudanese traders ventured southwards and opened up the new goldfields of Bure on the Upper Niger, in the region of Siguiri." For centuries, European powers aspired to control the mines, but even when the French under Louis Faidherbe finally managed to do so after 1860 output was low and the specialist engineers often died of disease. Some gold mining still takes place on the Malian side of the border.

== See also ==
- Birimian
- Inlier
- Kenieba
