= Oussoubidiagna =

- Town
- Location in Mali
- Coordinates: 14°15′0″N 10°27′50″W
- Country: Mali
- Region: Kayes Region
- Cercle: Bafoulabé Cercle
- Commune: Tomora
- Time zone: UTC+0 (GMT)

Oussoubidiagna is a small town and principal settlement (chef-lieu) of the commune of Tomora in the Cercle of Bafoulabé in the Kayes Region of south-western Mali.
