= Baoulé River =

River in Mali

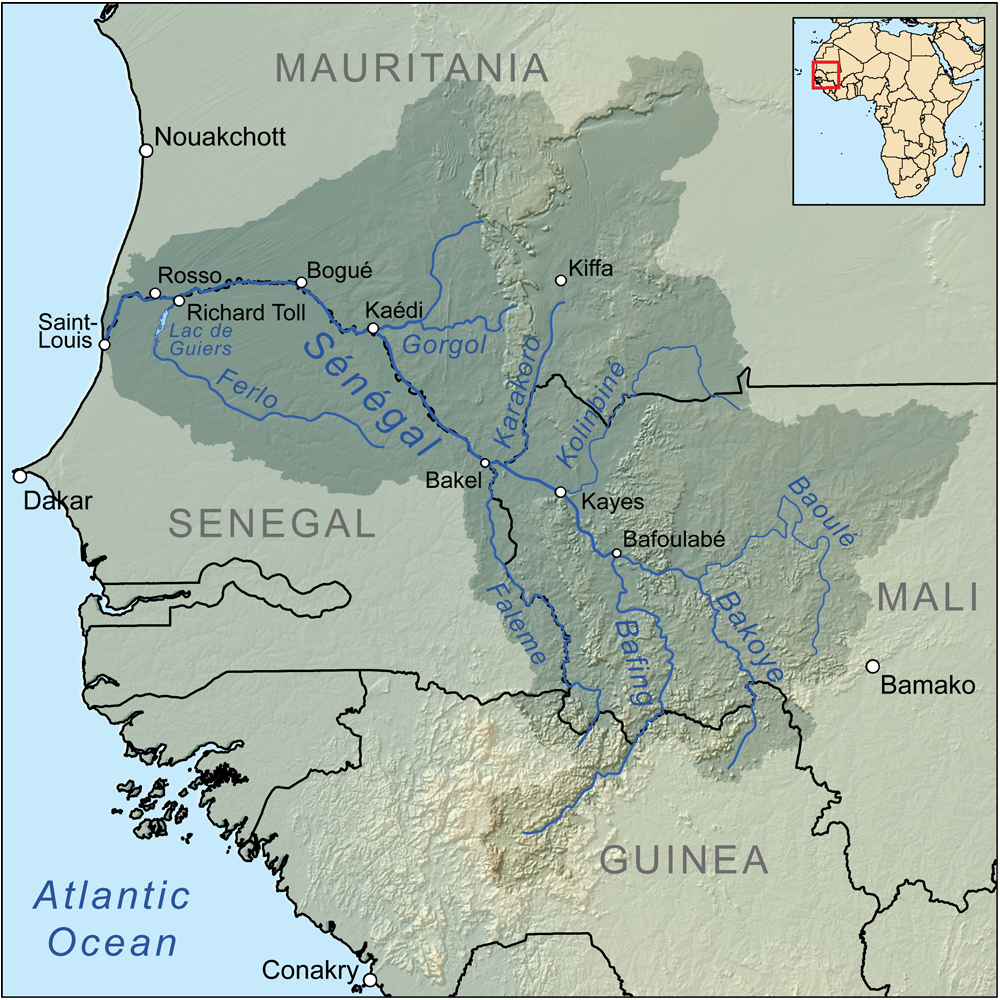
- Map of the Senegal River drainage basin

Location
- Country: Mali

Physical characteristics
- Mouth
  - location: Bakoy River near Toukoto
  - coordinates: 13°32′58″N 9°54′35″W
  - elevation: 750 meters (2,460 ft)

Basin features
- River system: Senegal River

The Baoulé River (French: Fleuve Baoulé, from Manding for "Red River") is a river in Mali in West Africa. It flows from a source west of Bamako to the Bakoy downstream of Toukoto and forms part of the Senegal watershed.

In Manding languages, Baoulé signifies 'red river', Bakoye 'white river' and Bafing 'black river'.

== Geography ==
The Baoulé's source is in the hills 120 kilometers south-west of Bamako near the Guinean border. It flows in a northerly direction for more than 200 kilometers, then turns to the west, making a wide meander, then a large northerly loop. Throughout this stretch, it constitutes the northern limit of the Boucle du Baoulé National Park. The last part of the Baoule flows in a southwesterly direction. It reaches the Bakoye on the right bank, about twelve kilometers downstream from Toukoto, almost doubling its flow.

Its total length is about 500 kilometers. It is not navigable.

== Flow ==
The average monthly flow, tracked over a period of 39 years (1952-1990) at a station opposite the small town of Bougouda at the Bakoy-Baoule confluence, was 64 cubic metres (2,300 cu ft) for a drainage area of approximately 65,000 square kilometres (7.0×10^{11} sq ft).
