= Jakhanke =

Jakhanke Jahanka Diakhanke
Regions with significant populations
- West Africa

Languages
- Jahanka, Mandinka, French

Religion
- Islam

Related ethnic groups
- Mandé peoples, especially: Soninke Wangara, Susu people, Mandinka people, Yalunka people, Dyula people, Bambara people, Bozo people

The Jakhanke -- also spelled Jahanka, Jahanke, Jahanque, Jahonque, Diakkanke, Diakhanga, Diakhango, Dyakanke, Diakhanké, Diakanké, or Diakhankesare -- are a Manding-speaking ethnic group in the Senegambia region, often classified as a subgroup of the larger Soninke. The Jakhanke have historically constituted a specialized caste of professional Muslim clerics (ulema) and educators. They are centered on one larger group in Guinea, with smaller populations in the eastern region of The Gambia, Senegal, Guinea-Bissau and in Mali near the Guinean border. Although generally considered a branch of the Soninke (also known as Serahule, Serakhulle or Sarakollé), their language is closer to Western Manding languages such as Mandinka.

Since the fifteenth century the Jakhanke clerical communities have constituted an integral part of the region and have exercised a high level of economic and religious influence upon Soninke as well as related Manding-speaking communities (such as the Dyula and Mandinka) in what is now Mali, Guinea, Senegal, Guinea-Bissau and The Gambia.

The endogamous Jakhanke clerics were influential in the diffusion of Islam among the Manding people in West Africa. While originally a religious caste of the Sarakollé, the Jakhanke later facilitated the trans-Saharan trade routes as merchants, such as in coastal rice and slaves, from the Guinea and Gambian coasts to the interior from at least the 17th century. In this way they are often compared with the Dyula, who formed a trade diaspora from the heartlands of the Mali Empire to the coast of what is today Côte d'Ivoire.

== Historical background ==
According to Levtzion, "The Mande-speaking Muslim traders, with whom the Portuguese negotiated on the Gambia were Diakhanke. The Diakhanke clans are of Soninke origin, and their traditions go back to Dinga, ancestor of the ruling dynasty of the ancient kingdom of Wagadu. They remember Dia in Massina as the town of their ancestor, Suware, a great marabout and a saint." They later established Diakaba in Bambuk.

The Jakhanke cultural ethos is best characterized by a staunch dedication to Islam, historical accuracy, rejection of jihad, non-involvement in political affairs and the religious instruction of young people. Formation of their regional Islamic identity began shortly after contact with Muslim Almoravid traders from North Africa in 1065, when Soninke nobles in Takrur (along the Senegal River in present-day Senegal) embraced Islam, being among the earliest sub-Saharan ethnic groups to follow the teachings of Muhammad.

In Senegambia, the Jakhanke inhabited scattered towns and villages in Futa Jallon, Futa Bundu, Dentilia, Bambuk, and other places. By 1725, at least fifteen Jakhanke villages were located in what would become Bundu. They claim to originate in Ja on the Niger River and Jahaba on the Bafing River, from which they moved to Bundu, Futa Jallon and Gambia. The Jakhanke were not primarily merchants, but agriculturists supported by slave labor. The various Jakhanke villages were independent of each other and of the local chiefs. The Jakhanke were committed to peaceful coexistence and refused to become engaged in politics or war. When threatened, they simply relocated their villages into safer territory. Often their villages enjoyed the privileges of sanctuary, judicial independence, and freedom from military service.

== Islamic practice ==
The Jakhanke were noted Islamic scholars. They trace their spiritual ancestry to the sahabas of the Prophet who came to spread the message of Islam and intermarry with the people of North Africa. Sheikh Al-Hajj Salim Suwari (d. 1525), a Muslim scholar who lived in the late fifteenth century, Karamba Touba Diaby, Karang Foday, Mahmudou Jaylani Jaiteh, and many others. They adhere to Maliki fiqh, although they have been tolerant of customary practices. Primary importance was stressed on obedience to the murshid, or Sufi master, and of stages of initiation into the teachings of the community. Schooled in the bāṭin (secret) sciences, Jakhanke clerics interpreted dreams and gave amulets for protection, which continue to be highly prized items. They celebrate the mawlid an-nabī (birthday of the Prophet) and the ‘īdu l-fiṭr (عيد الفطر) feasts at the end of Ramadan and other Muslim holidays.

== Commerce and the spread of Islam ==
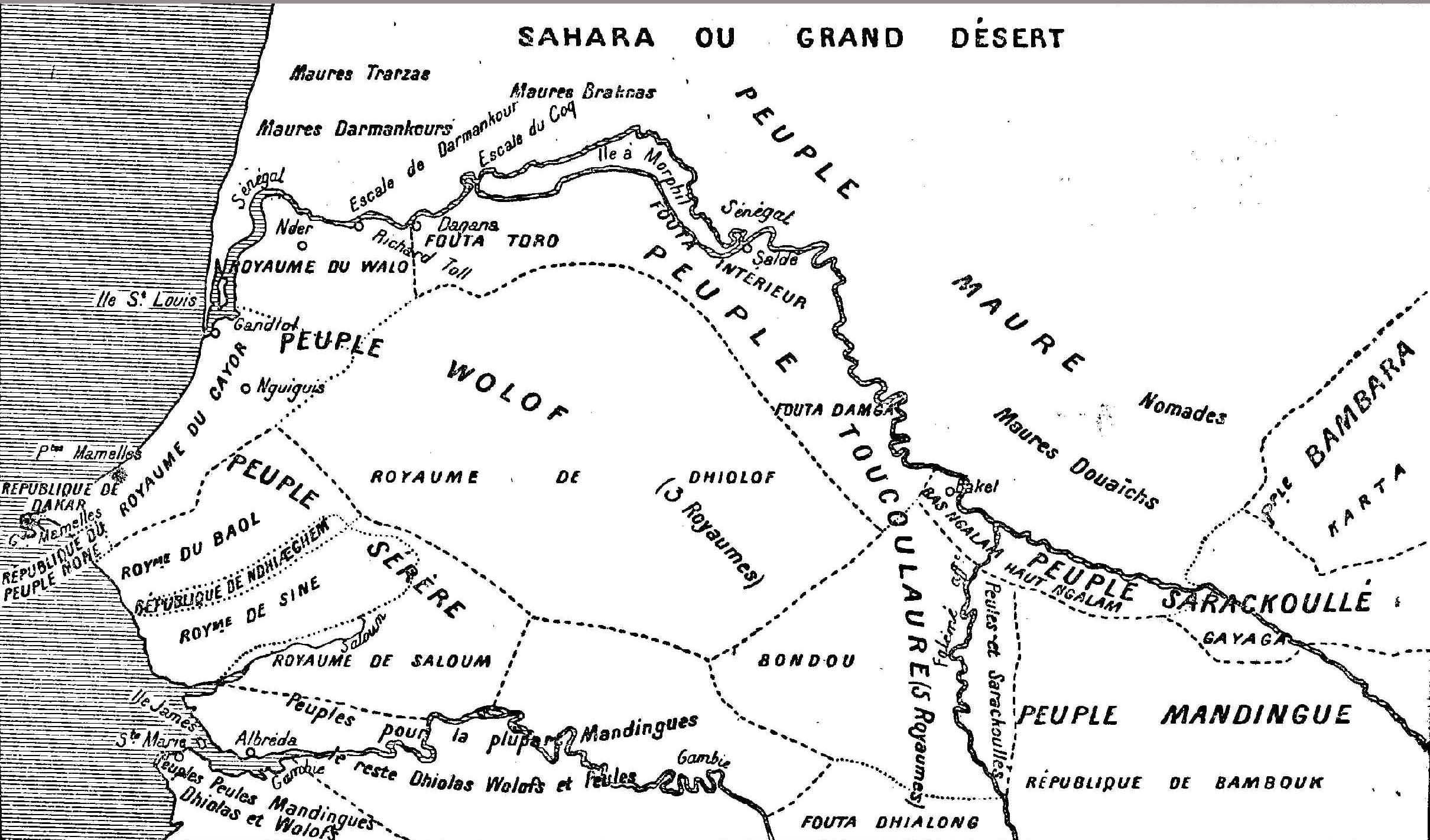
Map of the ethnic groups of Senegal drawn by David Boilat (1853)

Jakhanke people inherited their cleric roles and some pursued Islamic scholarship, as ulema or marabouts. Over time, they expanded into trade wherein their clerical and merchant roles were intertwined. Their trade included rice, salt, cloth, gold and slaves in the later centuries, first across the trans-Saharan caravan routes and later the trans-Atlantic market. In some regions, the Jakhanke monopolized their regional trading circuits, just like Zawaya clerics did in other markets.

West Africa's pre-Islamic trading networks with North Africa and the Middle East grew with the arrival of Muslim traders after the 8th century. These traders formed mutually supporting communities as networks that the African historian Philip Curtin dubbed a "trading diaspora." One good example of such a trading diaspora is the Jakhanke tribe from the Upper Guinea. According to Jakhanke historians, these traders began in the city of Jakha (on the Bafing River, a tributary of the Senegal) and, following their businesses, expanded into other locations. New Jakhanke towns were founded, under the auspices of local rulers who often permitted self-governance and autonomy. Sixteenth-century Europeans met Jakhanke traders at coastal points as far afield as Gambia and the Gold Coast; hence, they imagined the city called "Jaga" (Jakha) was a great metropolis controlling trade in all West Africa. Trading groups like the Dyula and Jakhanke did indeed dominate commerce of Upper Guinea, becoming involved not just in moving merchandise, but also in production of goods on plantations worked by their slaves.

== Caste and educational system ==
The Jakhanke were the Islamic cleric caste of the Soninke social stratification system. The Soninke social hierarchy organizes individuals into endogamous strata. The top level is held by fooro (free men), which included tunkalemmu (princes), leaders designated to exercise authority. They are followed by mangu (princely advisors), a group linked to a kuralemme (warrior) class who acted as defenders and mediators. The third in fooro hierarchy is occupied by modinu (priests, Jakanke), representing Islam's influence on Soninke society. Highly respected for their religious knowledge, modinu are responsible for establishing justice, providing Islamic education and protecting the population with prayers. Below the fooro strata, have been the despised castes of nayamala (dependent men). These included tago (blacksmiths), sakko (carpenters), jaroo (praise-singers), garanko (cobblers) and others. The strata below the horoo (free-men) and nayamala (dependent men) have been the endogamous komo (slaves).

=== Jakhanke curriculum ===
The Jakhanke clerical tradition is respected throughout the Muslim world for producing erudite and distinguished Islamic scholars. Their curriculum vitae are considered an excellent quality, nurturing the young with Muslim values while simultaneously encouraging intellectual pursuits in their natural environment. The standard Majalis program offered for Islamic sciences begins by incorporating a formal introduction into the rules governing recitation (tajwīd) and memorization of the Qur'an. Recitation should be done according to rules of pronunciation, intonation, and caesuras established by Muhammad, though first recorded in the 8th century. There are seven schools of tajwid, the most popular being the school of Hafs on the authority of ‘asim.

This is followed by an in-depth inquiry into the classical studies of Ulum al-hadith (Science of Hadith), Usul al-fiqh (Islamic Jurisprudence), Nahw arabī or Qawāidu 'l-luġati 'l'Arabiyyah (Standard Arabic Grammar): and language acquisition, which studies the learner's processes of acquiring language. The program is concluded following advanced level courses on the science of Qur'anic exegesis (tafsir). A total of 28 books must be mastered before a student is eligible to receive the cijaza or sanad (license to teach) from the University. In order to graduate, students are required to completely copy these 28 individual books by hand. If approved by their sheikh, the student is officially awarded permission to begin Islamic instruction at their own Karanta (school).

== Notable Jakhanke people ==
- Fodé Kaba Doumbouya, was a 19th century marabout
- Kani Dambakaté, Guinean musician
- Mouctar Diakhaby, Guinean footballer
- Pape Diakhaté, Senegalese footballer
- Herba Guirassy, Guinean footballer
- Serhou Guirassy, Guinean footballer
- Ahmed Tidiane Souaré, Guinean politician
- Mohamed Sylla, French rapper
- Ibrahima Sylla, Senegalese record producer
- Binetou Sylla, director of Syllart Records
- Mamadou Sylla, Guinean politician
- Sidya Touré, Guinean politician
- Mamadou Sakho, French footballer

== See also ==
- Mandinka people
- Soninke people
- Dyula people
