= Mahina, Mali =

Mahina
- Commune and town
- Location in Mali
- Coordinates: 13°45′30″N 10°50′55″W
- Country: Mali
- Region: Kayes Region
- Cercle: Bafoulabé Cercle
- Elevation: 330 ft (100 m)

Population (2009 census)
  - Total: 26,754
- Time zone: UTC+0 (GMT)

Mahina is a small town and commune in the Cercle of Bafoulabé in the Kayes Region of south-western Mali. The commune includes 24 small villages of which the largest are Mahina, Diallola, Sékodounga and Niakalinssiraya. In the 2009 census the commune had a population of 26,754.

The Dakar-Niger Railway has a station at Mahina and the railroad crosses the Bafing River over a bridge built in 1895. The bridge was repaired in 2022.
