= Al-Hajj Salim Suwari =

Sheikh Al-Hajj Salim Suwari was a 13th- or 15th-century West African Soninke karamogo (Islamic scholar) who focused on the responsibilities of Muslim minorities residing in a non-Muslim society. He formulated an important theological rationale for peaceful coexistence with the non-Muslim ruling classes called the Suwarian tradition, which survives to this day despite the pressures of modernism.

== Suwarian tradition ==
Sheikh Suwari formulated the obligations of Dyula minorities residing across West Africa into something dubbed the Suwarian tradition. It stressed the need for Muslims to coexist peaceably with unbelievers, and so justified a separation of religion and politics. The Suwarian prescription for peaceful coexistence involved seven main precepts: (a) unbelievers are ignorant, not wicked: (b) it is Allah's design that some people remain ignorant longer than others: (c) Muslims must nurture their own learning and piety and thereby furnish good examples to non-Muslims around them, so they will know how to behave when they are converted: (d) they could accept the jurisdiction of non-Muslim authorities, as long as they had the necessary protection and conditions to practice the faith in accordance with the sunnah of the Islamic prophet Muhammed. In this teaching Suwari followed a strong predilection in Islamic political philosophy for any government, albeit non-Muslim or tyrannical, as opposed to none: (e) The military jihad was a resort only in self-defense if the faithful were threatened. (f) Suwari discouraged dawah (proselytizing), instead contending that Allah would bring non-Muslims to Islam in His own way; it was not a Muslim's responsibility to decide when ignorance should give way to belief: (g) Muslims must ensure that, by their commitment to education and learning, they keep their observance of the Law free from error.

Historian Emily Osborn wrote that "central to Suwari’s teachings is the idea that God, not human beings, is responsible for designing and timing conversion to Islam. Suwarians consequently do not proselytize their faith to non-Muslims, and they reject militant jihad as a means to promote religious conversion."

=== Influence of the Suwarian tradition ===
Suwarians articulate an ideological level, without straying from orthodoxy, the peculiarities of the situation in which Muslims found themselves in the period following the collapse of imperial Mali. Described by author Nehemia Levtzion as "accommodationist Islam", it created a praxis to enable Muslims to function within essentially non-Muslim societies, accommodating their interests to those of the wider society while at the same time combating erosion of their distinctive Muslim identity. Since their form of Islam was capable of accommodating traditional cults, the dyula often served as priests, soothsayers and counselors at the courts of animist rulers.

The Suwarian tradition was a realistic rationale for Muslims living in the woodland and forest regions of West Africa over the past five or six centuries. It was not without tension that came in part from the missionary dimension of Islam itself; it was challenged by Muslim reformers in recent centuries. Its neat compartments were obscured by occasional intermarriage between merchants and rulers. But the Suwarian tradition was resilient and useful, and it is probably similar to the positions of many African Muslim communities who found themselves in situations of inferior numbers and force, took advantage of their networks for trade, and enjoyed good relations with their "pagan" hosts.

== Spread of the Suwarian school ==
Al-Hajj Salim's scholarly activity was centered on the town of Jagha in the bilâd as-sûdân (Western Sudan), but his influence was greatest along the southern fringes of the Manding trade network, and corresponds to the period of the disintegration of the old Malian empire. From the accounts of Ivor Wilks and Lamin Sanneh it is difficult to date the lifespan of Salim Suwari. Wilks dates his life around the late 15th century, while Sanneh thinks he lived two centuries earlier, around the late 13th century. Differences notwithstanding, Wilks intimates that his teachings were nurtured by his followers in Niger, Senegal and middle section of the Niger river from where they conveyed the tradition to the Voltaic region in the sixteenth and seventeenth centuries. Wilks describes it as "pacifistic and quietist in content," implying a tolerant and respectful approach to non-Muslims, while in the words of Sanneh, one of the imperatives of the tradition is its "travel or mobility (al-safar) involving the penetration of distant lands for the purposes of religion."

== Scholarly legacy ==
The Suwari school of thought was a scholarly discipline that enjoyed a substantial number of ulema as well as a long history among West African Muslims. Ivor Wilks observes that "almost all of the asanid, scholarly chains owned by Muslim scholars of Ghana, Côte d'Ivoire and Burkina Faso converge on the highly revered figure of Kong Liman Abbas" whose own chain can be traced backwards "in twelve teaching generations to Al-Hajj Salim Suwari." Wilks traces a long chain of scholars and students that passed through the tradition of Suwari, ranging from Saghanugu Liman of Bobo-Dioulasso (Burkina Faso), Ibrahim bin al-Mustapha of Wa, Ghana, Al-Amin bin Muhammad al-Abyad Kulibali of Kong, Côte d'Ivoire to Sa’id bin Abd al-Qadir, of Wa.

It may not be stretching the point to suggest that the same tradition of ulema, especially the Kamaghaté, Wattara of the Soninke Wangara patronym, were the influential Muslims and traders in Kumasi in the years before the late 1890s when the Hausa Muslims migrated in large waves to Kumasi after the collapse of Salaga. It is probable that the Suwari tradition swept through greater parts of the Ghanaian Muslim communities – Wenchi, Wa, Gonja, Dagbon, and among some of the Kumasi Muslims, excluding the Hausas and other Muslims of Nigerian origin. And His great grandson Shiek Alhaj Baba Suwari of Wenchi in Ghana also contributed to massive spread of Islam in the sub-region.

The Jakhanke people also trace their spiritual ancestry to al-Hajj Salim Suwari, and since they believed that the spirits of dead saints kept guard over their followers and interceded for them before Allah, the graves of al-Hajj Salim and other great teachers were centers for pilgrimage.
