= Gounfan =

- Commune and town
- Location in Mali
- Coordinates: 13°29′45″N 11°5′15″W
- Country: Mali
- Region: Kayes Region
- Cercle: Bafoulabé Cercle

Population (2009 census)
  - Total: 6,030
- Time zone: UTC+0 (GMT)

Gounfan is a small town and commune in the Cercle of Bafoulabé in the Kayes Region of south-western Mali. In the 2009 census the commune had a population of 6,030.
