= Kakoulou =

- Village
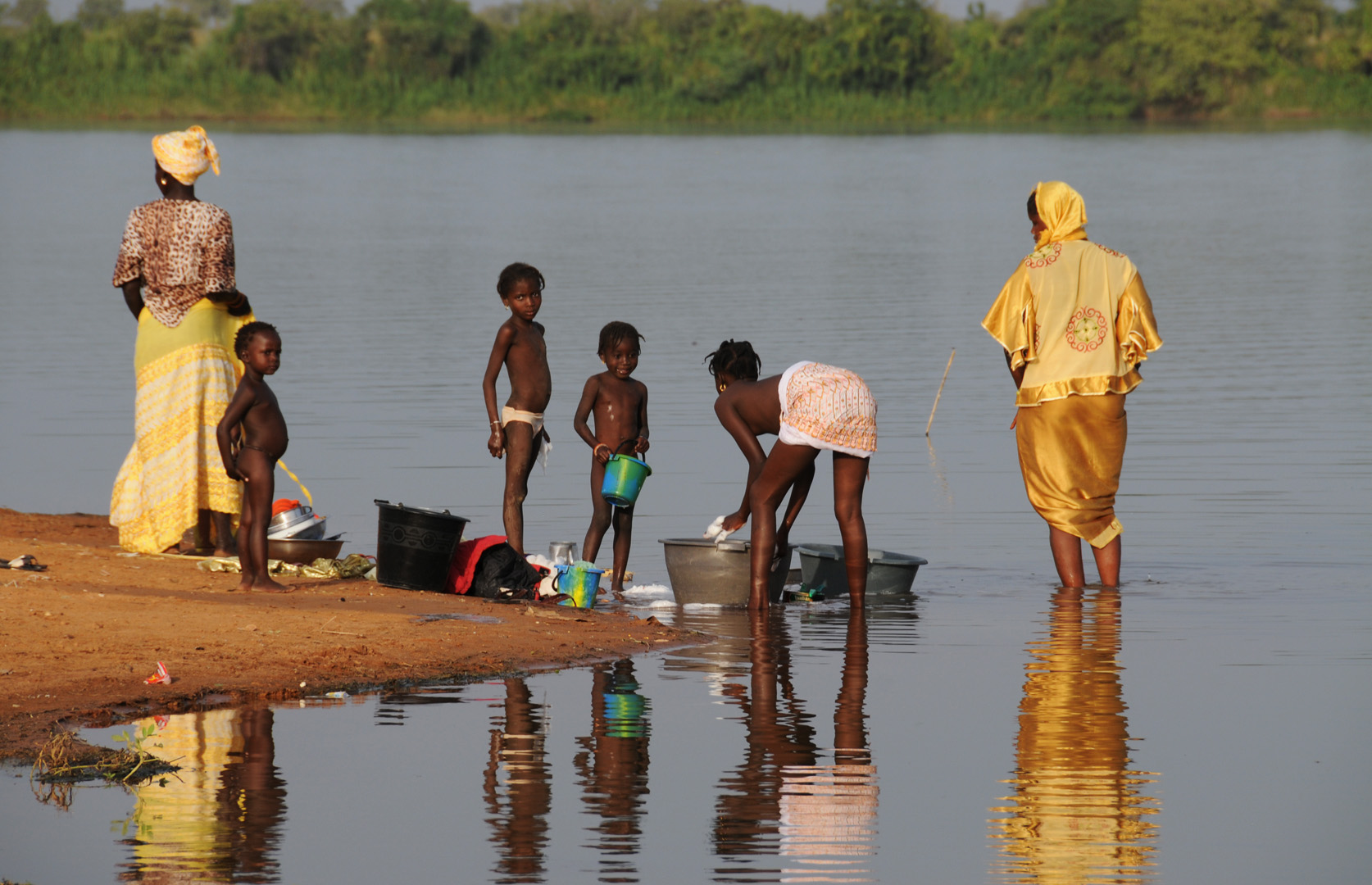

- Location in Mali
- Coordinates: 14°17′N 11°16′W
- Country: Mali
- Region: Kayes Region
- Cercle: Kayes Cercle
- Commune: Logo
- Time zone: UTC+0 (GMT)

Kakoulou is a village and principal settlement (chef-lieu) of the commune of Logo in the Cercle of Kayes in the Kayes Region of south-western Mali.
