= Logo, Mali =

Logo
- Commune
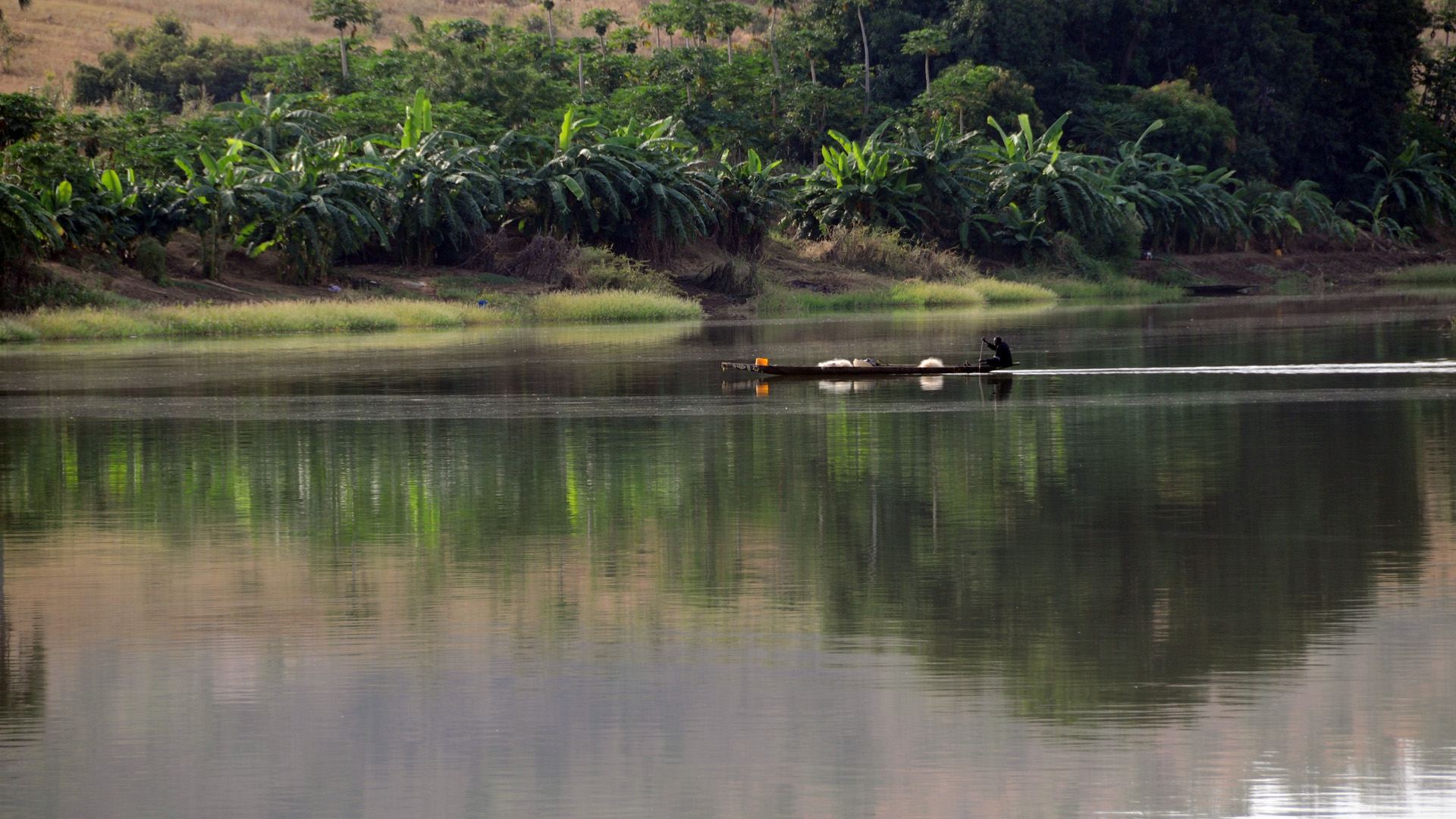
- Dinguira in the commune of Logo

- Location in Mali
- Coordinates: 14°17′N 11°16′W
- Country: Mali
- Region: Kayes Region
- Cercle: Kayes Cercle

Population (2009 census)
  - Total: 13,873
- Time zone: UTC+0 (GMT)

Logo is a commune in the Cercle of Kayes in the Kayes Region of south-western Mali. The main village (chef-lieu) is Kakoulou . In 2009 the commune had a population of 13,873.

The Malinke Kingdom of Logo was traditionally a constituent kingdom of Khasso, with its capital at Saboucire. Logo was attacked and conquered in September 1878 by the French, the first step in the military conquest of the French Sudan.
