= Koundian, Mali =

Koundian
- Commune and town
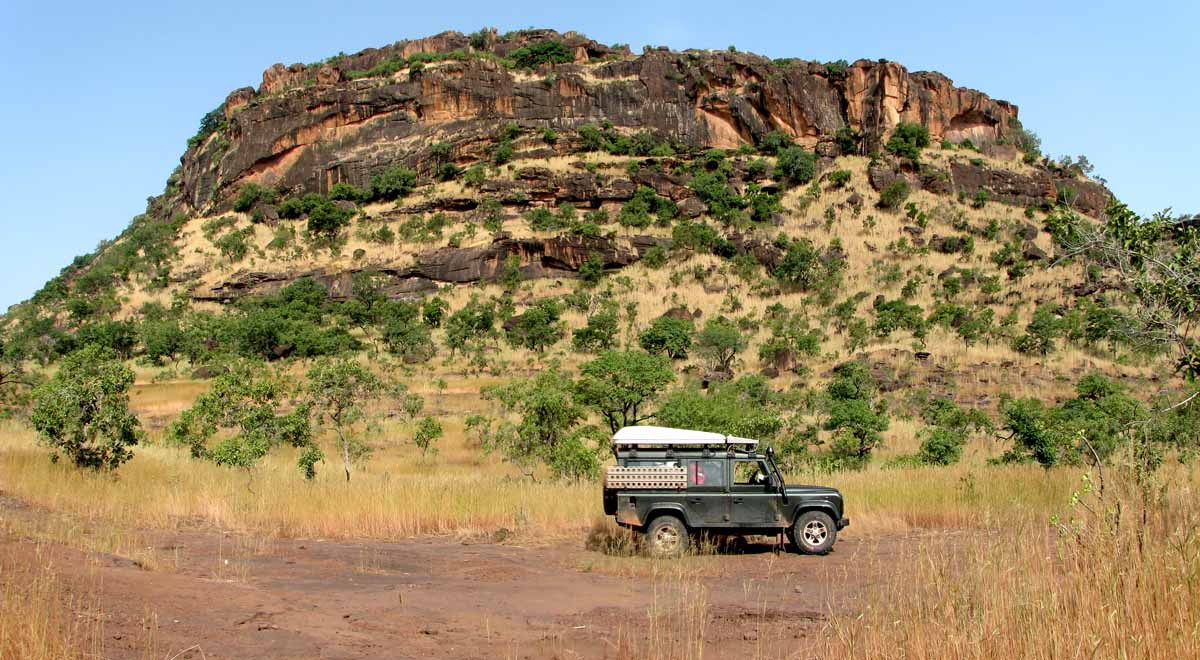

- Location in Mali
- Coordinates: 13°09′35″N 10°40′50″W
- Country: Mali
- Region: Kayes Region
- Cercle: Bafoulabé Cercle

Population (2009 census)
  - Total: 14,075
- Time zone: UTC+0 (GMT)

Koundian is a small town and commune in the Cercle of Bafoulabé in the Kayes Region of south-western Mali. In the 2009 census the commune had a population of 14,075.

The Toucouleur leader El Hadj Umar Tall built a tata near the village in 1857. The design and construction, which took 5 months, was supervised by the engineer Samba Ndiaye. Along with the tatas of Koniakary, Saboucire, and Mourgoula, it protected the heart of the Toucouleur Empire from French encroachment. The fort was captured by French troops led by Louis Archinard on February 18th, 1889, and dismantled.

== Sources ==
- Meillassoux, C. (1966), "Plans d'anciennes fortifications (Tata) en pays Malinké", Journal de la Société des Africanistes (in French), 36 (1): 29–44, doi:10.3406/jafr.1966.1403. Page 42 contains a plan of the village showing the fort.
