= Diokeli =

- Commune and village
- Location in Mali
- Coordinates: 13°18′40″N 10°33′02″W
- Country: Mali
- Region: Kayes Region
- Cercle: Bafoulabé Cercle

Population (2009 census)
  - Total: 16,023
- Time zone: UTC+0 (GMT)

Diokeli is a village and commune in the Cercle of Bafoulabé in the Kayes Region of south-western Mali. Although Diokeli is the administrative centre (chef-lieu), the largest village is Diakaba. In the 2009 census the commune had a population of 16,023.
