= Sidibela =

- Commune
- Location in Mali
- Coordinates: 13°17′N 11°05′W
- Country: Mali
- Region: Kayes Region
- Cercle: Bafoulabé Cercle

Population (2009 census)
  - Total: 5,966
- Time zone: UTC+0 (GMT)

Sidibela is a commune in the Cercle of Bafoulabé in the Kayes Region of south-western Mali. The main village (chef-lieu) is Tigana. In the 2009 census the commune had a population of 5966.

== Geography and climate ==
Sidibela is located in the northwest of Bafoulabé Cercle. It is bordered to the north and east by the commune of Tomora, south by that of Bafoulabé to the west by that of Ségala in Kayes Cercle and is located some 65 km away from Bafoulabé city.

The land is typically rugged and includes plains, plateaus, hills and mountains and has several ponds and seasonal streams. The soils are varied and suitable for agriculture and may be gravelly, silty or clay. The commune has a Sahelian climate, with rainfall varying from 700 to 900 mm per year with three seasons: dry, rainy and cold. Vegetation is diverse and consists of grasses, shrubs and some trees such as baobab. Some vegetation is extracted for firewood, lumber, and for medical purposes. The roads Bafoulabé to Oussoubidiagna and Kayes to Segala to Oussoubidiagna are the only routes through the town.

== Administration ==
The commune was founded under the law No. 96 - 059/AN- RM of November 4, 1996, when seven villages of the former borough Oussoubidiangna formed the current rural commune of Sidibela. The commune is administered by a board of 11 elected ministers headed by a bureau composed of the mayor and two deputy members.

== Economy ==
The economy is largely based on agriculture, farming, harvesting, trade and crafts. The main crops produced are sorghum, maize, rice, millet, sweet potatoes, beans and groundnuts and the cultivation of vegetables such as onion, tomato, eggplant, greens, squash, okra, etc. Cattle, sheep, goats, horses and poultry are reared, but are mostly intended for food supply. There is also a grains bank in the main town of Tigana with cereal.
