= Festival Dansa-Diawoura =

Festival in Mali

The Festival Dansa-Diawoura festival took place in Bafoulabé in Mali, and in the surrounding villages, from April 8 to April 10, 2005, in the presence of Cheick Oumar Sissoko, Minister of Culture and the writer Doumbi Fakoly.

The "dansa" and the "diawoura" are traditional dances of the Khasso country. The Festival Dansa-Diawour ended in the third day of the "Mali Sadio", which commemorates the friendship between the girls of the village and a hippopotamus. In the Malinké language, "Mali Tchadio" means "hippopotamus which has two colors". Tchadio transformed itself into Sadio. The hippopotamus was struck down by a French colonel during the French colonial reign.
