= Lake Manantali =

Artificial lake in Mali

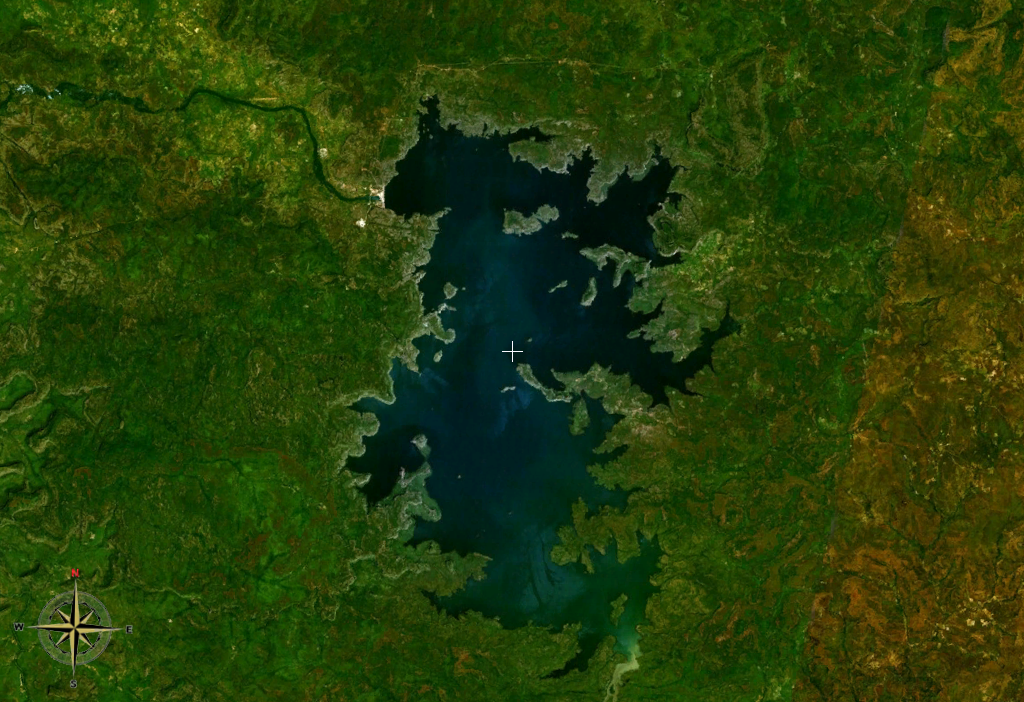
- View from space. The Manantali Dam is at the top left corner of the lake, with the Bafing River running towards Senegal to the northwest. The river continues directly south.

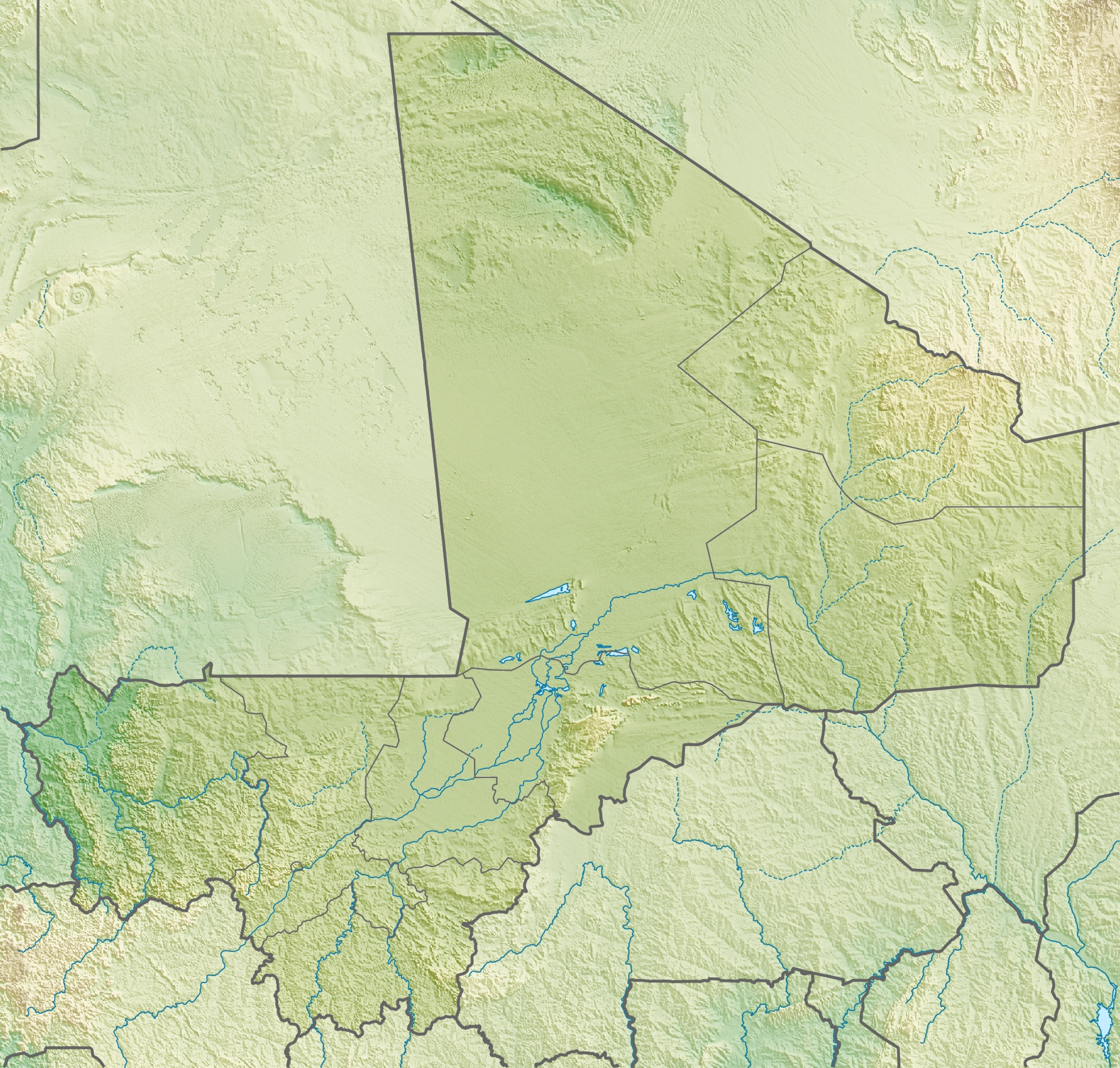
- Location within Mali
- Coordinates: 13.158°N 10.344°W
- Type: artificial
- Primary inflows: Bafing River
- Primary outflows: Bafing River
- Basin countries: Mali
- Surface area: 477 km^{2} (184 sq mi)
- Water volume: 11.3 billion cubic metres (9.2×10^{6} acre⋅ft)
- Settlements: Manantali, Tondidji

Lake Manantali is a large artificial lake, formed by the 1989 construction of the Manantali Dam, on the Bafing River in Mali. Its northern point is located 90 km to the south-east of the city of Bafoulabé.

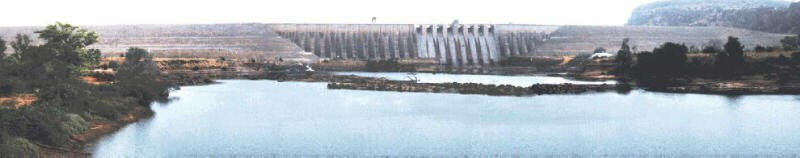
Manantali Dam

== Size ==
Lake Manantali covers 477 km^{2} and contains 11.3 billion m^{3} of water. Its formation forced 12,000 people from their homes and flooded 120 km^{2} of forest. The lake largely ended the flood patterns on both the Bafing and Senegal Rivers, compromising traditional agriculture which depended upon seasonal flooding. The lake has created benefits as well: consistent navigation downstream of the dam, irrigation of surrounding land, and a source for commercial fishing. The dam itself provides hydroelectric power through much of the region.
