= Bamafele =

Bamafélé
- Commune and town
- Location in Mali
- Coordinates: 13°6′N 10°24′W
- Country: Mali
- Region: Kayes Region
- Cercle: Bafoulabé Cercle

Population (2009 census)
  - Total: 13,622
- Time zone: UTC+0 (GMT)

Bamafélé is a town and commune in the Cercle of Bafoulabé in the Kayes Region of south-western Mali. In the 2009 census the commune had a population of 13,622.
