= Bambouk Mountains =

Mountain range in Mali

Coordinates: 13.8700°N 11.6500°W

The Bambouk Mountains are a mountain range in western Mali, near its border with Senegal. They were once a major centre for gold mining, selling the metal to Arab traders as early as the 12th century. Mali is currently the third largest producer of gold in Africa because it still mines the mountain range's now significantly diminished deposits.
