= Koundian, Kankan =

Koundian
- Village
- Location in Guinea
- Coordinates: 10°42′N 10°8′W
- Country: Guinea
- Region: Kankan Region
- Prefecture: Kouroussa Prefecture
- Time zone: UTC+0 (GMT)

Koundian is a village on the Niger River in the Kouroussa Prefecture in the Kankan Region of central Guinea.
