= Diakon =

- Commune and town
- Location in Mali
- Coordinates: 14°37′35″N 10°43′55″W
- Country: Mali
- Region: Kayes Region
- Cercle: Bafoulabé Cercle

Population (2009 census)
  - Total: 34,100
- Time zone: UTC+0 (GMT)

Diakon is a town and commune in the Cercle of Bafoulabé in the Kayes Region of western Mali. In the 2009 census the commune had a population of 34,100.
