= Sabouciré =

- Village
- Location in Mali
- Coordinates: 14°19′N 11°16′W
- Country: Mali
- Region: Kayes Region
- Cercle: Kayes Cercle
- Commune: Logo

Population (2002)
  - Total: 1,050
- Time zone: UTC+0 (GMT)

Sabouciré is a village in the commune of Logo in the Cercle of Kayes in the Kayes Region of south-western Mali. It was the capital of the Malinke Kingdom of Logo, traditionally a constituent kingdom of Khasso. In September 1878, a French detachment under colonel Reybaud assaulted and captured the town, killing the king Niamody Sissoko, in retaliation against Sissoko's support for the Toucouleur Empire. This was the first step in the military conquest of the French Sudan, and the surrounding area was deserted for two years.

In modern Mali, Saboucire is remembered as the first 'martyr village' to colonialism, with the date of its capture (22/23 September) falling on the same day as Malian independence.
