= Koundian, Guéckédougou =

Koundian
- Town
- Location in Guinea
- Coordinates: 9°4′N 10°26′W
- Country: Guinea
- Region: Nzérékoré Region
- Prefecture: Guéckédougou Prefecture
- Time zone: UTC+0 (GMT)

Koundian is a town in the Guéckédougou Prefecture in the Nzérékoré of south-eastern Guinea.
