= Manding Mountains =

Highland region of Mali

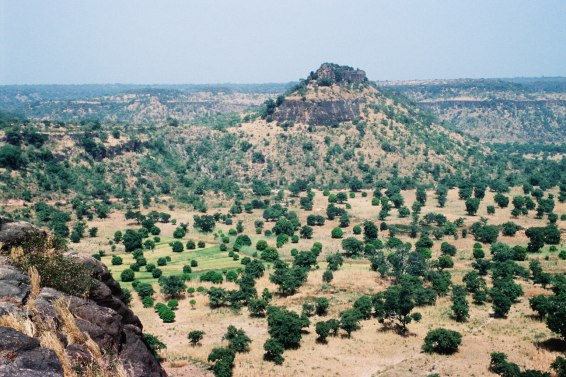
The Manding Mountains, as seen from Siby, Mali.

The Manding Mountains are a highland area in Mali, stretching between its western border with Guinea to an area 50km west of Bamako, Mali's capital. They reach 457 metres (1,499 ft) above sea level. Kangaba, the spiritual home of the Mandinka people, is located at the foot of the mountains.

The range is composed of sandstone, sculpted into dramatic buttes and cliffs by erosion. Some of these formations have been named by locals, such as the Butte of the Stubborn Woman, said to be a woman who refused to search any more for her lost husband and was punished by being turned to stone.
