= Bakoy River =

River in Guinea and Mali

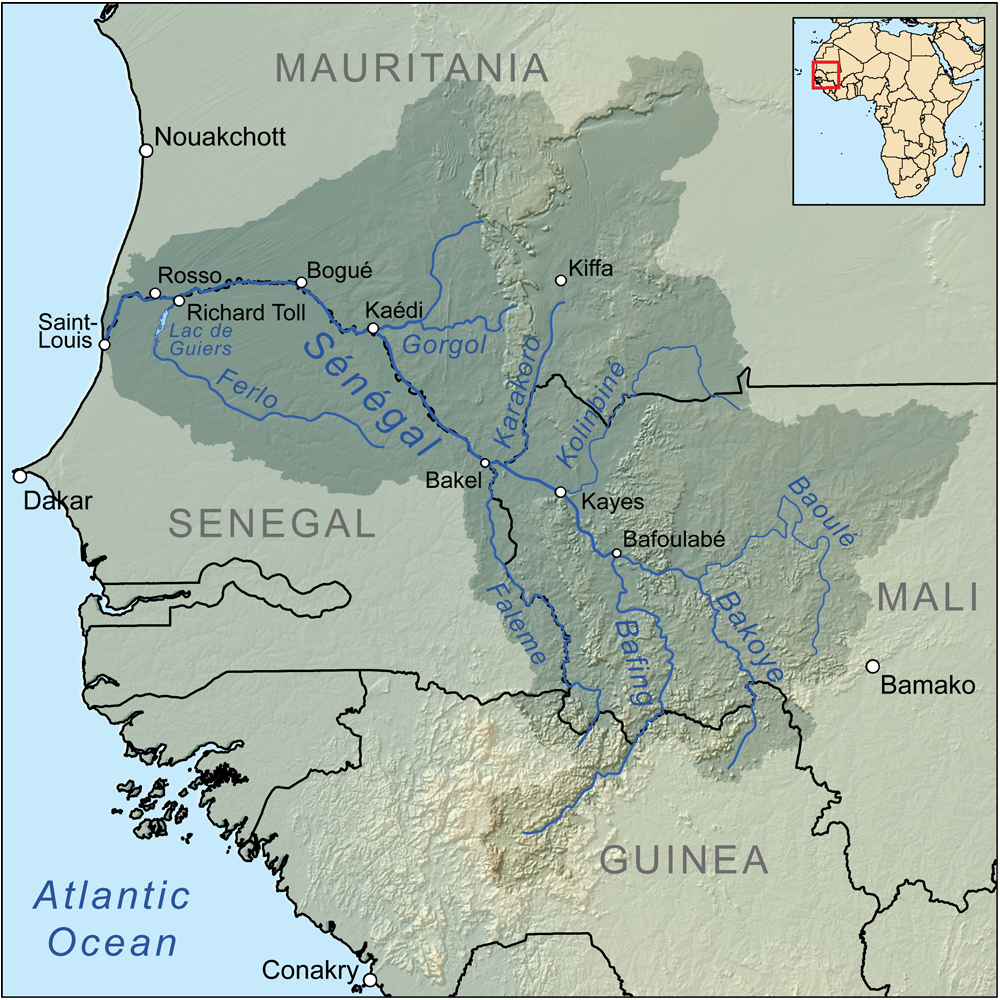
- Map of the Sénégal River drainage basin
- Native name: Rivière Bakoye (French)

Location
- Countries: Guinea and Mali

Physical characteristics
- Source: Monts Ménien
  - location: Menien-Koma, Guinea
  - coordinates: 11°50′N 9°45′W
  - elevation: 760 m (2,490 ft)
- Mouth: Sénégal River
  - location: Bafoulabé, Mali
  - coordinates: 13°48′50″N 10°49′41″W
  - elevation: 83 m (272 ft)
- Length: 560 km (350 mi)
- Basin size: 85,600 km^{2} (33,100 sq mi)
- Discharge
  - average: 156 m^{3}/s (5,500 cu ft/s)

Basin features
- River system: Sénégal River
- Tributaries
  - right: Baloué 13°32′58″N 9°54′35″W

Bakoy River at Oualia, Mali

Average monthly flow (m^{3}/s) at the Oualia gauging station over the period 1951-1978

The Bakoy or Bakoye River (French: Rivière Bakoy) is a river in West Africa. It runs through Guinea and Mali and joins with the Bafing River to form the Sénégal River at Bafoulabé in the Kayes Region of western Mali. In Manding languages, Bakoye signifies 'white river', Bafing 'black river' and Baloué 'red river'.

The source of the Bakoy is at an elevation of 760 m (2,490 ft) in the granite Monts Ménien to the northwest of Siguiri in Guinea. The river flows north and forms part of the international border between Guinea and Mali. It then meanders across the Manding Plateau and joins its principal affluent, the Baloué, which rises to the west of Bamako. The Bakoy is 560 km (350 mi) in length and drains a basin of around 85,600 km^{2} (33,100 sq mi). The river is seasonal with a maximum flow in September after the start of the West African Monsoon and almost no flow between January and June. The large year-to-year variation in the intensity of the monsoon gives rise to large changes in the discharge of the Bakoy River. For the exceptionally dry year of 1972, the average flow at the Oualia gauging station, 54 km (34 mi) upstream of Bafoulabé, was only 30 m^{3}/s (1,100 cu ft/s) while in 1958 the value was 260 m^{3}/s (9,200 cu ft/s). The average flow over the period 1951-1978 was 156 m^{3}/s (5,500 cu ft/s), corresponding to an annual discharge of 4.9 km^{3} (1.2 cu mi). At Bafoulabé, the average discharge of the Bakoy is between a third and a half of that of the Bafing.
