= Vallée de l'Ahzar =

River in West Africa

Vallée de l'Ahzar (15°41′N 3°51′E) is a wadi in West Africa. For most of its course, the wadi forms part of the international boundary between Mali and Niger. It separates Mali's Ménaka Region from the Tahoua and Tillabéri Regions of Niger.
