= Oualia =

- Commune and town
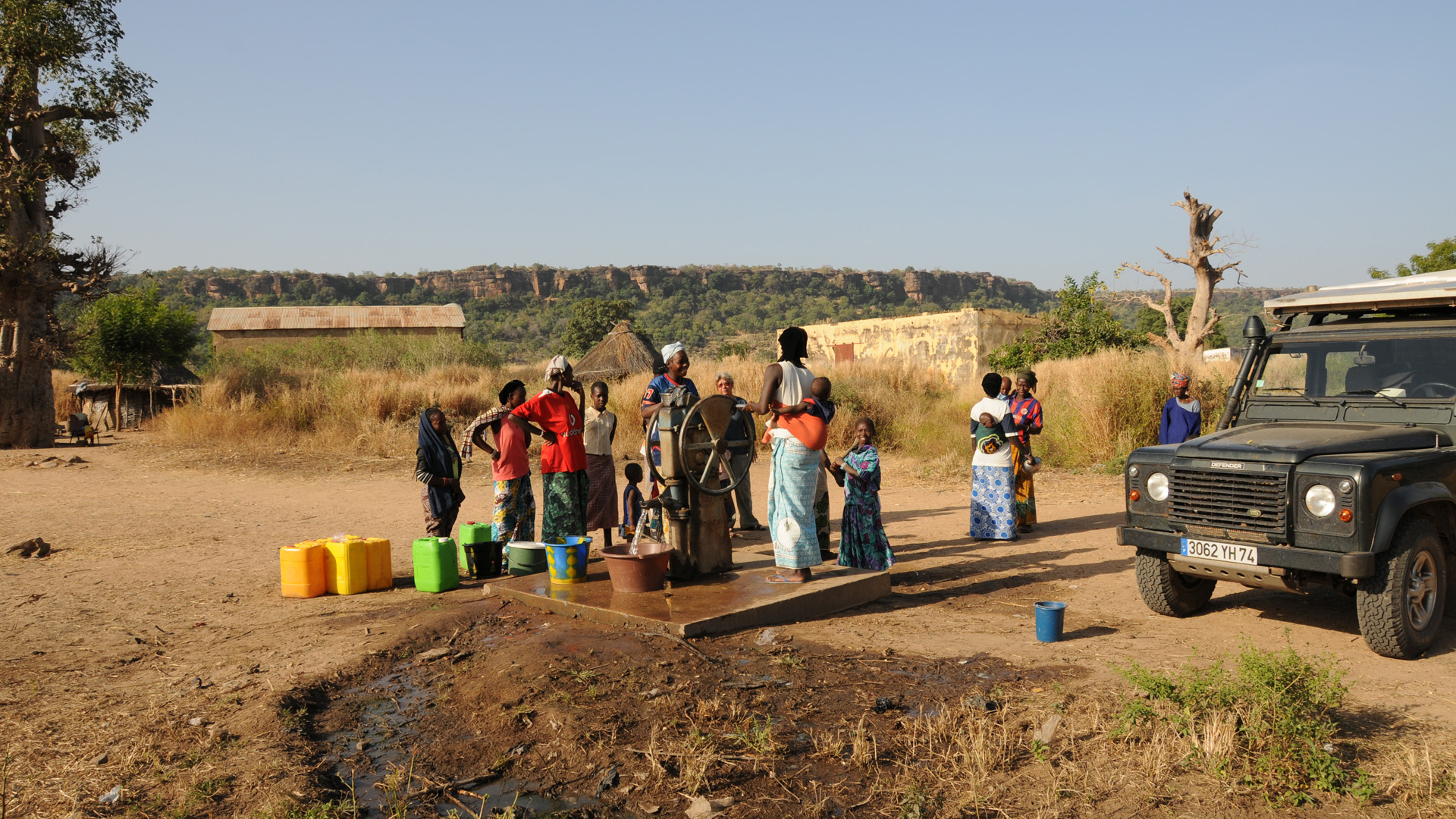

- Location in Mali
- Coordinates: 13°36′N 10°23′W
- Country: Mali
- Region: Kayes Region
- Cercle: Bafoulabé Cercle

Population (2009 census)
  - Total: 20,989
- Time zone: UTC+0 (GMT)

Oualia is a small town and commune in the Cercle of Bafoulabé in the Kayes Region of south-western Mali. In the 2009 census the commune had a population of 20,989.
