= Kontela =

- Commune
- Location in Mali
- Coordinates: 14°2′22″N 10°22′0″W
- Country: Mali
- Region: Kayes Region
- Cercle: Bafoulabé Cercle

Population (2009)
  - Total: 21,538
- Time zone: UTC+0 (GMT)

Kontela is a commune in the Cercle of Bafoulabé in the Kayes Region of south-western Mali. The commune contains 28 villages and hamlets. The principal village (chef-lieu) is Goundara. In the 2009 census the commune had a population of 21,538.
