= Doumbi Fakoly =

African writer (1944–2024)

- Born: January 1, 1944 Kita, French Sudan, French West Africa
- Died: September 29, 2024 (aged 80)
- Subject: Pan-Africanism

Doumbi Fakoly (January 1, 1944 – September 29, 2024) was a Malian writer. He was the author of children's literature. Fakoly's work, novels and essays, mainly deals with social issues such as AIDS, religion, racism.

== Biography ==
Born in 1944 in Kita, Mali, Doumbi Fakoly spent his childhood in Senegal. He went on to study in France, where he obtained a degree in banking (French: Diplôme d'étude supérieures en banques). From 1978 to 1980, he worked for Banque Meridien Biao Mali.

In 1983, he published his first book, They Died for France (French: Morts pour la France), a historical tale about Senegalese skirmishers who fought for France during World War II. In his 1984 book The Supreme Guide's Early Retirement (La retraite Anticipée du Guide Suprême), he criticized the dictatorial regimes that followed the independence of many African countries.

In 1988, he published AIDS Control Certificate (Certificat de Contrôle Anti-Sida), a novel about a teenage girl whose father is accused of being HIV-positive. Adventure in Ottawa (L'Aventure à Ottawa), published in 1991, was his first novel aimed at a younger audience. Bilal the Prophet (Bilal le Prophète), another historical tale, was released in 1992, and The Revolt of the Galsénésiennes (La Révolte des Galsénésiennes), a tribute to women, followed in 1994.

In 1997, he published a complete study on Pan-Africanism. In 1999, he tackled the issue of forced marriage in his second young adult book.

Fakoly published Africa, the Rebirth (Afrique, la Renaissance), an essay that attempts to explain the causes of Africa's cultural alienation, in 2000. In 2003, he wrote an initiatory tale about Mali, Conquering the Magic Fountain, (A la conquête de la fontaine magique).

On February 14, 2023, Fakoly was sentenced to 12 months in prison, 8 of which were suspended, for "blasphemy".

He regularly led workshops and conferences on African spirituality. Fakoly lived in France, was married and had two children.

Fakoly died on September 29, 2024, at the age of 80.

== Views ==
Doumbi-Fakoly believed that the rebirth of Africa is only possible if the Black-African people (and descendants) go back to their ancestral Black-African Spirituality. According to him, the Abrahamic religions (Judaism, Christianity and Islam) have negative consequences for the Black-African people (and descendants).

== Bibliography ==
- Morts pour la France, 1983 (Karthala, Paris).
- La retraite Anticipée du Guide Suprême, 1984 (l'Harmattan, Paris)
- Certificat de Contrôle Anti-Sida, 1988 (Publisud, Paris)
- Aventure à Ottawa, 1991 (Hurtubise, Montreal)
- Bilal le Prophète, 1992 (Panafrica Plus, Ottawa)
- La Révolte des Galsénésiennes, 1994 (Publisud, Paris)
- Le Guide du Panafricaniste, 1997 (Editions Nouvelles du Sud, Paris)
- Un Mariage forcé 1999, (CEDA, Abidjan)
- Afrique, la Renaissance, 2000 (Publisud, Paris)
- A la conquête de la fontaine magique, 2003 (l’Harmattan, Paris)
- L’origine négro-africaine des religions dites révélées, 2004 Editions Menaibuc, Paris (ISBN 2911372514)
- Introduction à la prière négro-africaine, 2005, Editions Menaibuc, Paris (ISBN 2911372808)
- La Colonisation : L'autre crime contre l'humanité (le cas de la France coloniale), 2005, Editions Menaibuc, Paris (ISBN 2911372891)
- Fakoly Prince du Mande, 2005, L'Harmattan, Paris (ISBN 2747547418)
- L'origine biblique du racisme anti-noir, 2005, Editions Menaibuc, Paris (ISBN 2911372794)
- Anta, grand prêtre d'Atum, 2005, Editions Menaibuc, Paris (ISBN 2911372662)
- Cheikh Anta Diop Explique aux Adolescents, 2006, Editions Menaibuc, Paris (ISBN 2911372980)
- Horus, fils d'Isis : (Le mythe d'Osiris expliqué), 2006, Editions Menaibuc, Paris (ISBN 2911372999)
- La Bible en proces, 2008, Editions Menaibuc, Paris ISBN 2353490832
- Ces Dieux et Ces Egrégores Etrangers Qui Tuent le Peuple Noir, 2008, Editions Menaibuc, Paris (ISBN 2353490409)
- Les chemins de La Maât, 2008, Editions Menaibuc, Paris (ISBN 2353490328)
- Marcus Garvey expliqué aux adolescents, 2009, Editions Menaibuc, Paris (ISBN 2353491022)
- L'Islam est-il une religion pour les Noirs ?, 2009, Editions Menaibuc, Paris (ISBN 235349112X)
- An Introduction to How Black-African People should Pray, 2009, English traduction from Prof. Emmanuel Cadet, Editions Menaibuc, Paris (ISBN 978-2-35349-076-9)
