= Bafoulabé Cercle =

Coordinates: 13°40′N 10°40′W

Bafoulabé
- Cercle
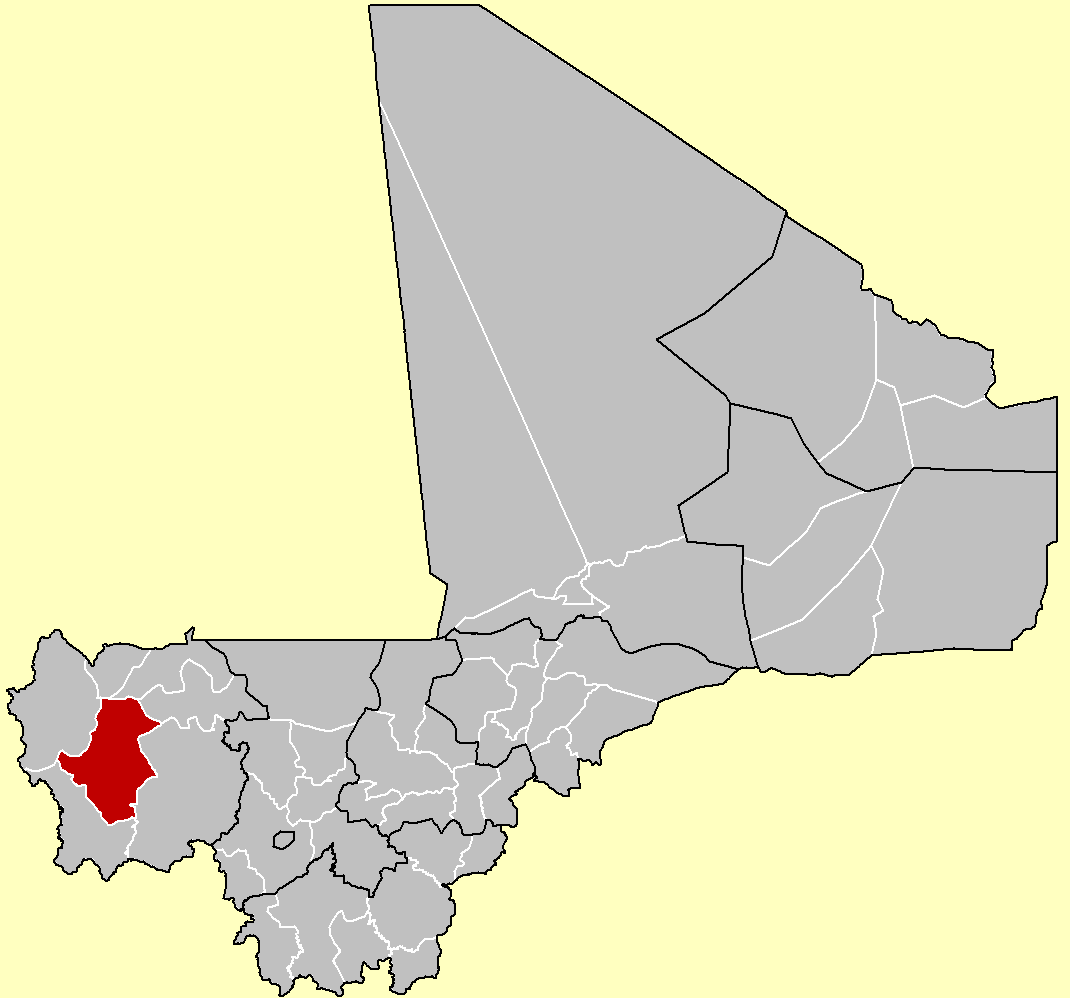
- Location of Bafoulabé Cercle in Mali
- Country: Mali
- Region: Kayes Region
- Capital: Kayes

Area
  - Total: 20,220 km^{2} (7,810 sq mi)

Population (2009)
  - Total: 233,926
  - Density: 11.57/km^{2} (29.96/sq mi)
- Time zone: UTC+0 (GMT)

Bafoulabé Cercle is an administrative subdivision of the Kayes Region of Mali. The administrative center (chef-lieu) is the town of Bafoulabé. In the 2009 census the population of the cercle was 233,926.

The cercle is divided into thirteen communes:

- Bafoulabé
- Bamafele
- Diakon
- Diallan
- Diokeli
- Gounfan
- Kontela
- Koundian
- Mahina
- Niambia
- Oualia
- Sidibela
- Tomora
