= Bafing River =

River in Guinea and Mali

Bafing River Rivière Bafing (French)
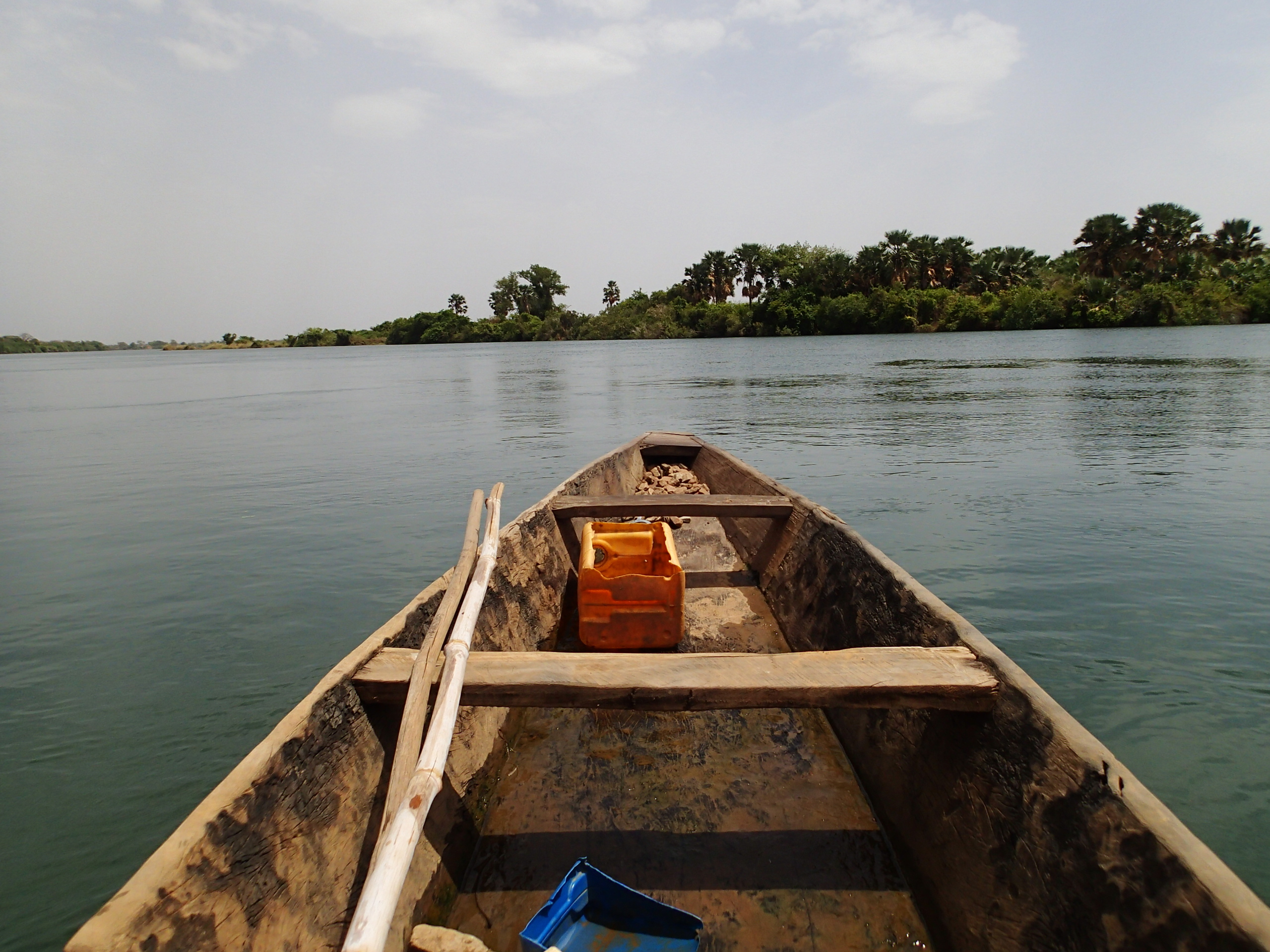
- View of Bafing river from a Bozo Pirogue

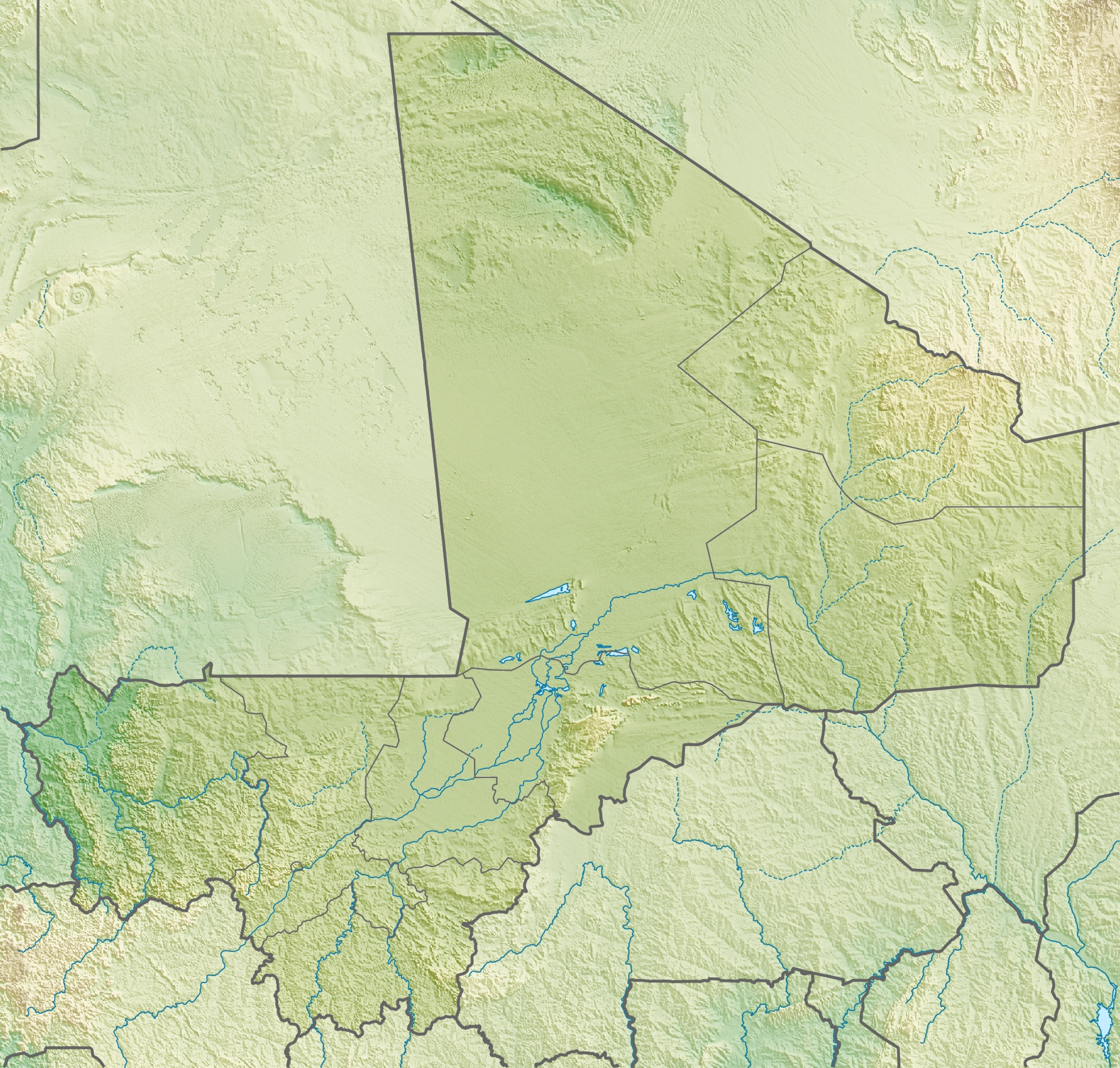
- Location of the mouth in Mali

Location
- Countries: Mali, Guinea

Physical characteristics
- Source: Fonta Djallon
  - location: Foranruel, Guinea
  - coordinates: 10.395°N 12.135°W
  - elevation: 750 m (2,460 ft)
- Mouth: Senegal River
  - location: Bafoulabé, Mali
  - coordinates: 13°48′47″N 10°49′41″W
  - elevation: 83 m (272 ft)
- Length: 350 miles (560 km)

Basin features
- River system: Senegal River

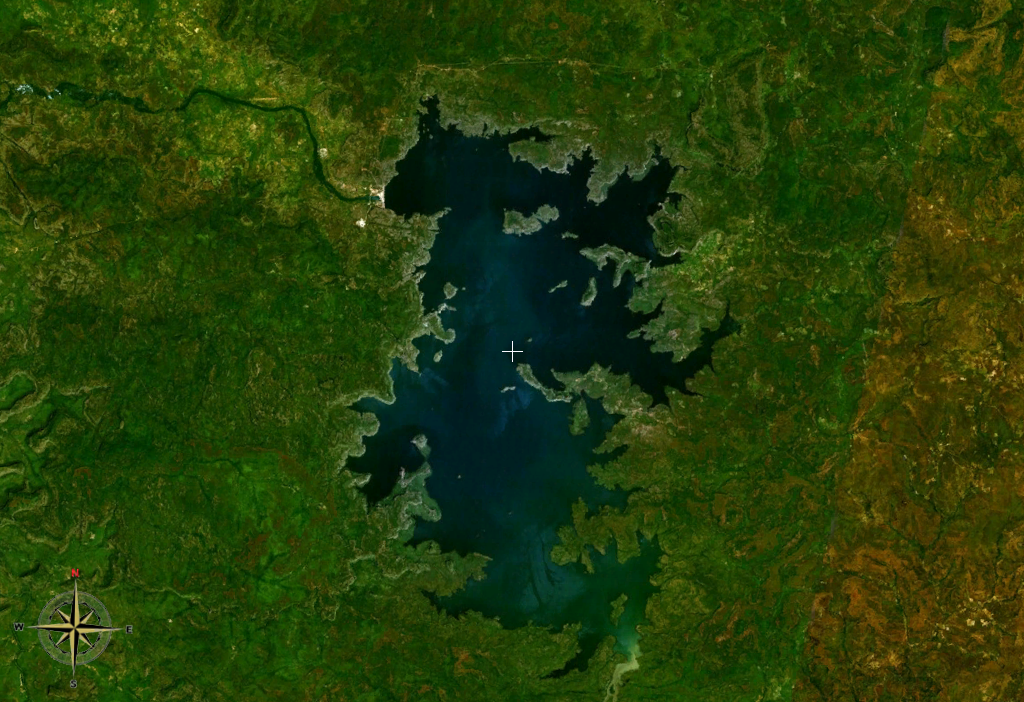
Lake Manantali with the Manantali Dam and the Bafing River

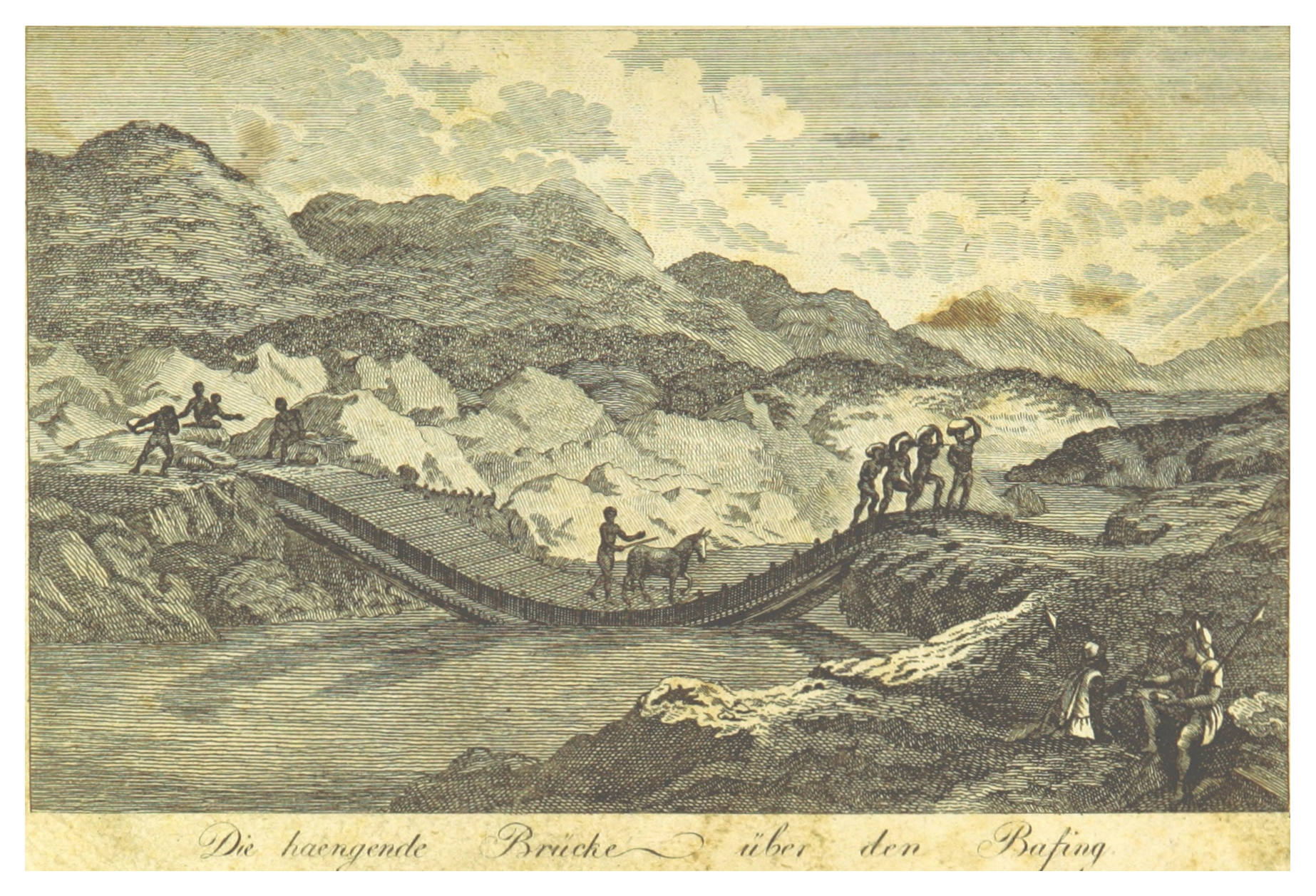
A hanging bridge over the Bafing (published 1800)

The Bafing River (Manding for "black river", French: Rivière Bafing) is the upper course and largest tributary of the Senegal River which runs through Guinea and Mali and is about 350 miles (560 km) long.

== Course ==
The Fouta Djallon in Guinea is the source of the Bafing River, 30 miles (48 km) north of Mamou. It flows for about 350 miles (560 km) and converges with the Bakoy River to join the Senegal River in western Africa. The Bafing River is the largest tributary of the Senegal River, and contributes almost half of its total water volume. The Bafing forms part of the international border between Guinea and Mali.

== Irrigation ==
Flooding from the Bafing River along the Senegal River had been traditionally relied on as a means of supporting local agriculture. However, a drought in the 1970s necessitated the construction of dams on both the Bafing River and the Senegal River. The Manantali hydroelectric dam, completed in 1987, is located on the Bafing River 90 kilometres (56 mi) upstream of Bafoulabé. It forms the largest artificial lake in Mali, Lake Manantali. The dam retains 11.3 cubic kilometres (2.7 cu mi) of water which is used to power the turbines during the dry season. As a result, the intensity of the maximum flood downstream of the dam has been reduced but during the dry season, a flow of between 150 m^{3}/s (200 cubic yards per second) and 200 m^{3}/s (260 cubic yards per second) is maintained.

== Ecology ==
There may be a significant chimpanzee population in the area east of the Bafing River. The blue-headed bee-eater (merops muelleri) has also been sighted at the forest on the river south of the Manding Mountains.
