= Diala Banlieue =

- Village
- Location in Mali
- Coordinates: 14°27′54″N 11°29′28″W
- Country: Mali
- Region: Kayes Region
- Cercle: Kayes Cercle
- Commune: Liberte de Mbaya
- Time zone: UTC+0 (GMT)

Diala Banlieue (also Dyalla) is a village and principal settlement (chef-lieu) of the commune of Liberté Dembaya in the Cercle of Kayes in the Kayes Region of south-western Mali.
