= Liberté Dembaya =

- Commune
- Location in Mali
- Coordinates: 14°27′54″N 11°29′28″W
- Country: Mali
- Region: Kayes Region
- Cercle: Kayes Cercle

Population (2009 census)
  - Total: 13,074
- Time zone: UTC+0 (GMT)

Liberté Dembaya is a commune in the Cercle of Kayes in the Kayes Region of south-western Mali, near the border of Senegal. The main village (chef-lieu) is Diala Banlieue. In 2009 the commune had a population of 13,074.
