= List of cities in Mali =

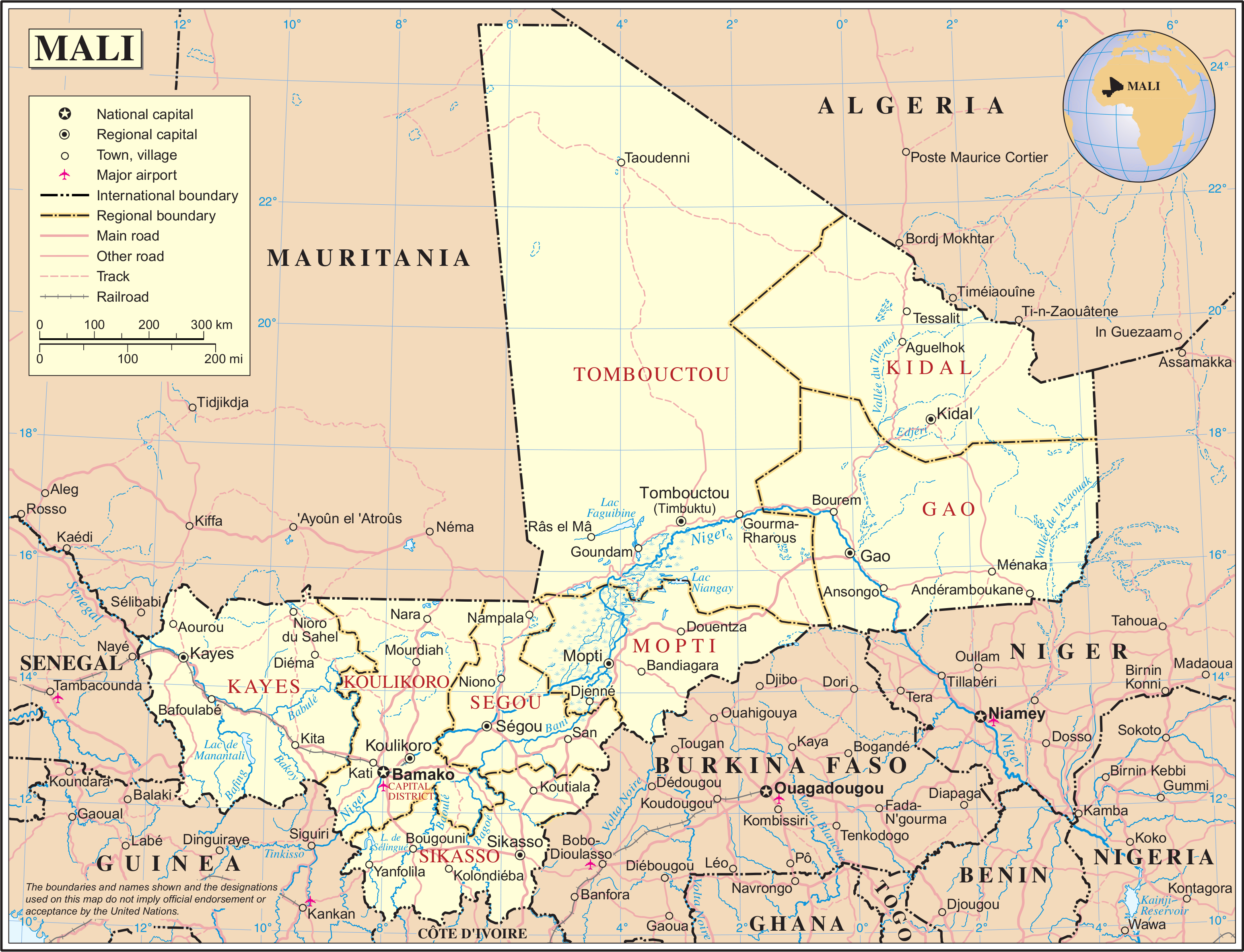
A map of Mali

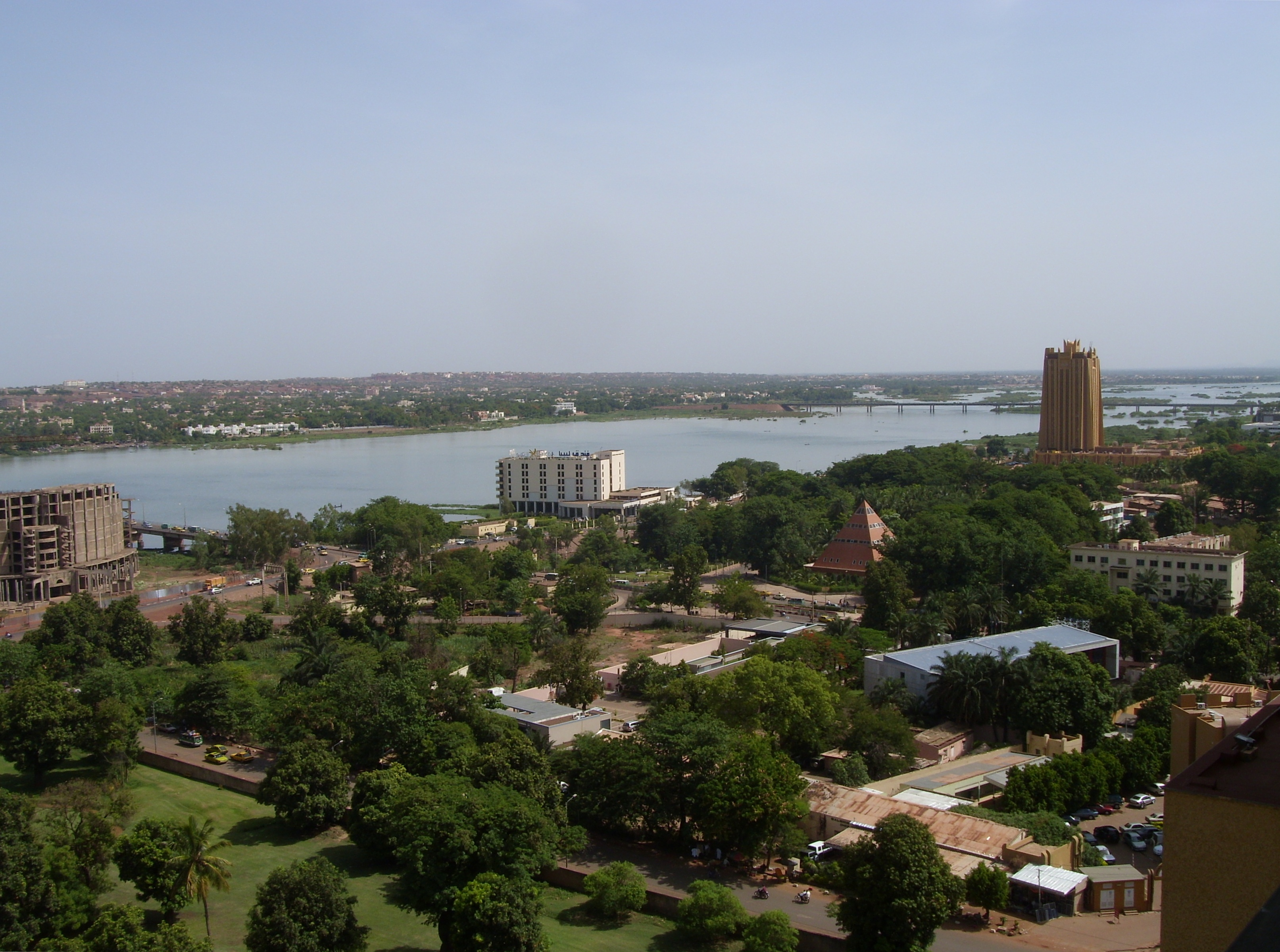
Bamako, the capital and Mali's largest city, 2008

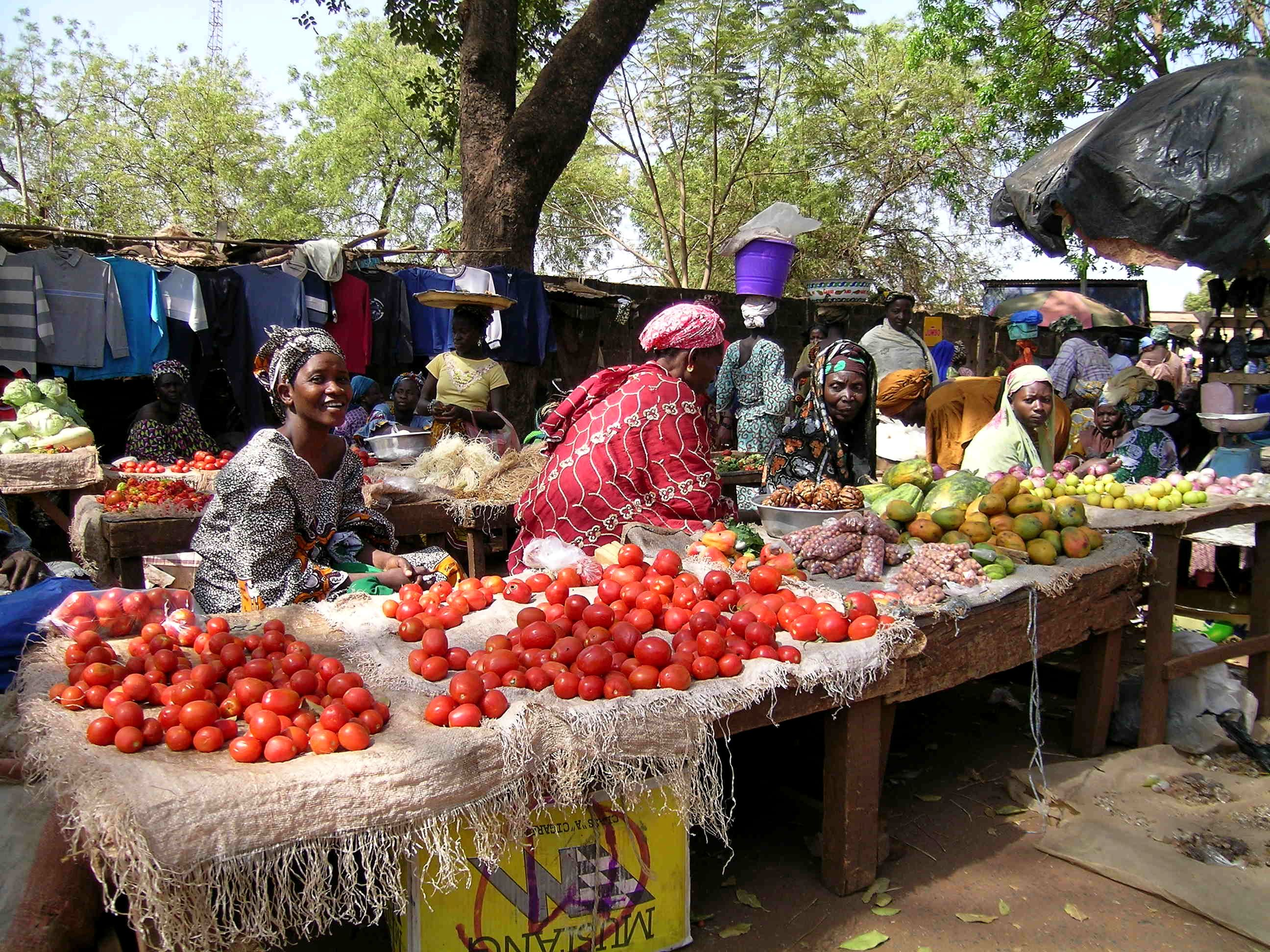
Sikasso, Mali's second largest city, 2008

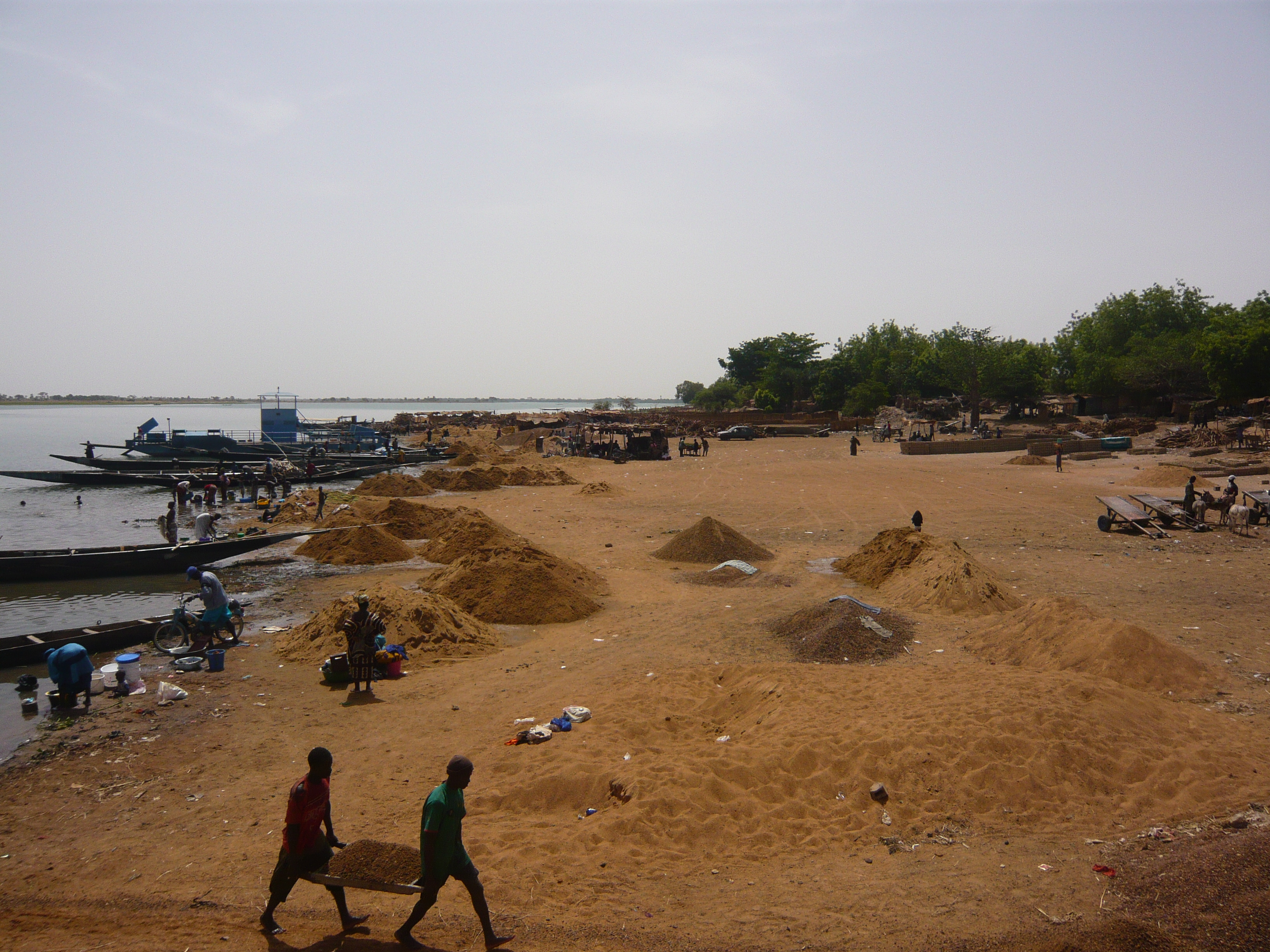
Ségou, Mali's fifth largest city, 2008

This list of cities in Mali tabulates all the largest communes in the country of Mali (including those in the north-eastern portion where the Mali Government no longer exercises de facto control). Besides the largest cities and towns (all urban communes are shown), this table also includes other large rural communes with a population in excess of 50,000.

By far the largest agglomeration in Mali is the capital, Bamako, with a population of 1,809,106 (at the 2009 Census). Thus about 12½ percent of Mali's population lives in Bamako.

== Cities ==
The following table lists all communes with over 50,000 population from the 1 April 2009 census, together with the higher-level administrative unit (région) and second-level unit (cercle) in which each is situated. The population figures refer to the real city (i.e. commune) without any suburbs in neighbouring communes.

Bamako is a separate capital district and is not within any région or cercle; it comprises six urban communes (not individually listed in the table below), which are numbered rather than named.

Name	Region	Cercle	Urban or rural commune	Pop. 1998 Census	Pop. 2009 Census	Average Annual Change
Bamako	Bamako	Bamako	Six Urban communes	1,016,296	1,809,106	4.8
Sikasso	Sikasso	Sikasso	Urban	134,774	225,753	4.8
Kalabancoro	Koulikoro	Kati	Rural	35,582	166,722	15.1
Koutiala	Sikasso	Koutiala	Urban	76,914	137,919	5.5
Ségou	Ségou	Ségou	Urban	105,305	130,690	2.0
Kayes	Kayes	Kayes	Urban	67,424	127,368	6.0
Kati	Koulikoro	Kati	Urban	52,714	114,983	7.3
Mopti	Mopti	Mopti	Urban	80,472	114,296	3.2
Niono	Ségou	Niono	Rural	54,251	91,554	4.9
Gao	Gao	Gao	Urban	52,201	86,633	4.7
San	Ségou	San	Urban	46,631	68,067	3.5
Koro	Mopti	Koro	Rural	41,440	62,681	3.8
Bla	Ségou	Bla	Rural	27,568	61,338	7.5
Bougouni	Sikasso	Bougouni	Urban	37,360	59,679	4.3
Mandé	Koulikoro	Kati	Rural	30,577	59,352	6.2
Baguineda- Camp	Koulikoro	Kati	Rural	28,371	58,661	
Kolondiéba	Sikasso	Kolondiéba	Rural	37,945	57,898	3.9
Kolokani	Koulikoro	Kolokani	Rural	33,558	57,307	5.0
Pelengana	Ségou	Ségou	Rural	19,963	56,259	9.9
Timbuktu	Tombouctou	Timbuktu	Urban	29,732	54,453	5.7
Koury	Sikasso	Yorosso	Rural	33,605	54,435	4.5
Massigui	Koulikoro	Dioïla	Rural	42,665	53,947	2.2
Tonka	Tombouctou	Goundam	Rural	37,821	53,438	3.2
Kadiolo	Sikasso	Kadiolo	Rural	31,292	52,932	4.9
Wassoulou- Balle	Sikasso	Yanfolila	Rural	37,498	51,727	3.0
Kaladougou	Koulikoro	Dioïla	Rural	23,823	51,384	7.2
Koumantou	Sikasso	Bougouni	Rural	33,987	51,348	3.8
Ouelesse- bougou	Koulikoro	Kati	Rural	36,198	50,056	3.0

The next table lists all the remaining urban communes with under 50,000 population from the 1 April 2009 census, together with the higher-level administrative unit (région) and second-level unit (cercle) in which each is situated. The population figures refer to the real city (i.e. commune) without any suburbs in neighbouring communes.

Name	Region	Cercle	Popn 1998 Census	Popn 2009 Census
Kita	Kayes	Kita	31,861	48,947
Koulikoro	Koulikoro	Koulikoro	28,670	43,174
Fana	Koulikoro	Dioila	10,268	36,854
Nioro	Kayes	Nioro	22,266	33,486
Djenné	Mopti	Djenné	19,558	32,944
Douentza	Mopti	Douentza	13,138	28,005
Bourem	Gao	Bourem	21,227	27,486
Kidal	Kidal	Kidal	11,159	25,617
Bandiagara	Mopti	Bandiagara	21,058	25,564
Diré	Tombouctou	Diré	13,431	22,365
Goundam	Tombouctou	Goundam	9,030	15,253
Toya	Kayes	Yélimané	8,908	12,922
Troungoumbé	Kayes	Nioro	9,988	11,412
Ténenkou	Mopti	Ténenkou	7,675	11,310
Fatao	Kayes	Diéma	4,774	9,239
Kouniakary	Kayes	Kayes	7,023	8,135
Karan	Koulikoro	Kangaba	5,669	6,874
Youri	Kayes	Nioro	4,061	6,721
Somankidi	Kayes	Kayes	4,784	6,622
Fégui	Kayes	Kayes	2,688	5,494
Kourounikoto	Kayes	Kita	3,247	5,335
