= Cinzana =

- Commune and village
- Location in Mali
- Coordinates: 13°15′10″N 5°57′55″W
- Country: Mali
- Region: Ségou Region
- Cercle: Ségou Cercle

Area
  - Total: 1,050 km^{2} (410 sq mi)
- Elevation: 282 m (925 ft)

Population (2009 census)
  - Total: 36,440
  - Density: 34.7/km^{2} (89.9/sq mi)
- Time zone: UTC+0 (GMT)

Cinzana is a village and rural commune in the Cercle of Ségou in the Ségou Region of southern-central Mali. The commune includes 71 villages in an area of approximately 1,050 square kilometers. In the 2009 census it had a population of 36,440. The Bani River runs along the southern boundary of the commune. The village of Cinzana lies 41 km southeast of Ségou.
