= Nonongo =

- Village
- Location in Mali
- Coordinates: 13°41′58″N 5°31′6″W
- Country: Mali
- Region: Ségou Region
- Cercle: Ségou Cercle
- Commune: Kamiandougou
- Time zone: UTC+0 (GMT)

Nonongo is a village and seat of the rural commune of Kamiandougou in the Cercle of Ségou in the Ségou Region of southern-central Mali. It lies 94 km east-northeast of Ségou, the chef-lieu of the cercle.
