= Sagala, Mali =

Sagala
- Village
- Location in Mali
- Coordinates: 14°6′50″N 6°43′40″W
- Country: Mali
- Region: Ségou Region
- Cercle: Ségou Cercle
- Commune: Bellen
- Time zone: UTC+0 (GMT)

Sagala is a village and seat of the rural commune of Bellen in the Ségou Cercle in the Ségou Region of southern-central Mali. The village lies 89 km northwest of Ségou and 81 km east of Niono.
