= Saminé =

- Commune and town
- Location in Mali
- Coordinates: 13°8′4″N 6°4′53″W
- Country: Mali
- Region: Ségou Region
- Cercle: Ségou Cercle

Area
  - Total: 197 km^{2} (76 sq mi)
- Elevation: 280 m (920 ft)

Population (2009 census)
  - Total: 12,082
  - Density: 61.3/km^{2} (159/sq mi)
- Time zone: UTC+0 (GMT)

Saminé is a small town and rural commune in the Cercle of Ségou in the Ségou Region of southern-central Mali. The commune includes the town and 5 villages in an area of approximately 197 square kilometers. In the 2009 census it had a population of 12,082. The Bani River runs along the southern boundary of the commune. The town of Saminé, the chef-lieu of the commune, is 41 km south-southeast of Ségou.
