= Yolo, Mali =

Yolo
- Village
- Location in Mali
- Coordinates: 13°38′26″N 5°37′38″W
- Country: Mali
- Region: Ségou Region
- Cercle: Ségou Cercle
- Commune: Diédougou

Population
  - Ethnicities: Marka people
- Time zone: UTC+0 (GMT)

Yolo is a village and seat of the commune of Diédougou in the Cercle of Ségou in the Ségou Region of southern-central Mali. The village lies 80 km east-northeast of Ségou. It has hosted a major weekly market on Wednesdays since at least the 17th century.
