= Soignébougou =

- Commune and village
- Location in Mali
- Coordinates: 13°12′54″N 6°20′52″W
- Country: Mali
- Region: Ségou Region
- Cercle: Ségou Cercle

Area
  - Total: 81 km^{2} (31 sq mi)

Population (2009 census)
  - Total: 3,110
  - Density: 38/km^{2} (99/sq mi)
- Time zone: UTC+0 (GMT)
  - Summer (DST): UTC13 12 54, -6 20 52

Soignébougou is a village and rural commune in the Cercle of Ségou in the Ségou Region of southern-central Mali. The commune includes 8 villages in an area of approximately 81 square kilometers. In the 2009 census the population was 3,110. The village of Soignébougou, the chef-lieu of the commune, is 30 km southwest of Ségou.
