= Konodimini =

- Commune and village
- Location in Mali
- Coordinates: 13°19′26″N 6°25′22″W
- Country: Mali
- Region: Ségou Region
- Cercle: Ségou Cercle

Area
  - Total: 362 km^{2} (140 sq mi)

Population (2009 census)
  - Total: 16,719
  - Density: 46.2/km^{2} (120/sq mi)
- Time zone: UTC+0 (GMT)

Konodimini is a village and rural commune in the Cercle of Ségou in the Ségou Region of southern-central Mali. The commune includes 23 villages in an area of approximately 362 square kilometers. In the 2009 census it had a population of 16719. The village of Konodimini, the chef-lieu of the commune, lies 23 km southwest of Ségou, on the right (south) bank of the Niger River.
