= N'Gara, Ségou =

N'Gara
- Commune and village
- Location in Mali
- Coordinates: 13°18′35″N 6°30′15″W
- Country: Mali
- Region: Ségou Region
- Cercle: Ségou Cercle

Area
  - Total: 159 km^{2} (61 sq mi)

Population (2009 census)
  - Total: 11,700
  - Density: 73.6/km^{2} (191/sq mi)
- Time zone: UTC+0 (GMT)

N'Gara is a village and rural commune in the Cercle of Ségou in the Ségou Region of southern-central Mali. The commune includes three villages in an area of approximately 159 square kilometers. In the 2009 census it had a population of 11,700. The village of N'Gara, the chef-lieu of the commune, is 30 km southwest of Ségou.
