= Markanibougou =

- Village
- Location in Mali
- Coordinates: 13°35′41″N 6°9′26″W
- Country: Mali
- Region: Ségou Region
- Cercle: Ségou Cercle
- Commune: Baguindadougou
- Time zone: UTC+0 (GMT)

Markanibougou is a village and seat of the commune of Baguindadougou in the Ségou Cercle in the Ségou Region of southern-central Mali.
