= Doura =

- Village
- Location in Mali
- Coordinates: 13°55′44″N 6°12′27″W
- Country: Mali
- Region: Ségou Region
- Cercle: Ségou Cercle
- Commune: N'Koumandougou
- Elevation: 279 m (915 ft)
- Time zone: UTC+0 (GMT)

For the town in Guinea see Doura, Guinea; for the Palestinian town in Hebron, see Dura, Hebron; for the neighborhood in Baghdad, see Dora, Baghdad.

Doura is a village and seat of the commune of N'Koumandougou in the Ségou Cercle in the Ségou Region of southern-central Mali.
