= Diédougou, Ségou =

Diédougou
- Commune
- Location in Mali
- Coordinates: 13°38′26″N 5°37′38″W
- Country: Mali
- Region: Ségou Region
- Cercle: Ségou Cercle
- Admin centre (chef-lieu): Yolo

Area
  - Total: 409 km^{2} (158 sq mi)

Population (2009 census)
  - Total: 13,268
  - Density: 32.4/km^{2} (84.0/sq mi)
- Time zone: UTC+0 (GMT)

Diédougou is a rural commune in the Cercle of Ségou in the Ségou Region of Mali. The commune includes 21 villages in an area of approximately 409 square kilometers. In the 2009 census, it had a population of 13,268. The main village (chef-lieu) is Yolo, which lies 80 km east-northeast of Ségou.
