= Katiéna =

- Commune and village
- Location in Mali
- Coordinates: 13°19′18″N 5°38′29″W
- Country: Mali
- Region: Ségou Region
- Cercle: Ségou Cercle

Area
  - Total: 998 km^{2} (385 sq mi)

Population (2009 census)
  - Total: 33,180
  - Density: 33.2/km^{2} (86.1/sq mi)
- Time zone: UTC+0 (GMT)

Katiéna is a village and rural commune in the Cercle of Ségou in the Ségou Region of southern-central Mali. The commune includes 27 villages in an area of approximately 998 square kilometers. In the 2009 census it had a population of 33,180. The Bani River runs along the southern boundary of the commune. The village of Katiéna is the (chef-lieu) of the commune.
