= Diganibougou =

- Commune
- Location in Mali
- Coordinates: 13°29′55″N 6°18′55″W
- Country: Mali
- Region: Ségou Region
- Cercle: Ségou Cercle

Area
  - Total: 571 km^{2} (220 sq mi)
- Elevation: 289 m (948 ft)

Population (2009 census)
  - Total: 13,879
  - Density: 24.3/km^{2} (63.0/sq mi)
- Time zone: UTC+0 (GMT)

Diganibougou or Diganidougou is a rural commune in the Cercle of Ségou in the Ségou Region of Mali. The commune lies to the north of the Niger River opposite the urban commune of Ségou and includes 22 villages in an area of approximately 571 square kilometers. In the 2009 census the commune had a population of 13,879. The administrative center (chef-lieu) is the village of Digani.
