= Togou =

- Commune and village
- Location in Mali
- Coordinates: 13°35′30″N 5°59′55″W
- Country: Mali
- Region: Ségou Region
- Cercle: Ségou Cercle

Area
  - Total: 147 km^{2} (57 sq mi)

Population (2009 census)
  - Total: 8,987
  - Density: 61.1/km^{2} (158/sq mi)
- Time zone: UTC+0 (GMT)

Togou is a village and rural commune in the Cercle of Ségou in the Ségou Region of southern-central Mali. The commune contains 10 villages in an area of approximate 147 square kilometers. In the 2009 census it had a population of 8,987. The village of Togou, the chef-lieu of the commune, is 35 km northeast of Ségou.

== History ==
The modern town of Togou sits close by several archaeological sites, which show that the area was an important node in a large-scale trade network reaching from Sierra Leone to the Sahara beginning in the 9th century AD. During the Segou Empire it was a major markadugu, a Maraka trade town where salt, dried fish, and sunbala were shipped as far south as Abidjan in exchange for kola nuts.

In January 1865, Togou was occupied by Bambara fighters resisting the Toucouleur Empire. A Toucouleur counter-attack led by Tierno Alassane failed, losing much of their arms and ammunition including one hundred and twenty barrels of gun-powder and many war drums.
