= Boussin =

- Commune and village
- Location in Mali
- Coordinates: 13°30′25″N 5°56′10″W
- Country: Mali
- Region: Ségou Region
- Cercle: Ségou Cercle

Area
  - Total: 178 km^{2} (69 sq mi)

Population (2009 census)
  - Total: 12,401
  - Density: 69.7/km^{2} (180/sq mi)
- Time zone: UTC+0 (GMT)

Boussin is a village and rural commune in the Cercle of Ségou in the Ségou Region of southern-central Mali. The commune includes 15 villages in an area of approximately 178 square kilometers. In the 2009 census it had a population of 12,401. The village of Boussin lies 36 km east of Ségou.
