= Bellen =

- Commune
- Location in Mali
- Coordinates: 14°6′50″N 6°43′40″W
- Country: Mali
- Region: Ségou Region
- Cercle: Ségou Cercle
- Admin centre (chef-lieu): Sagala

Area
  - Total: 3,189 km^{2} (1,231 sq mi)

Population (2009 census)
  - Total: 3,373
  - Density: 1.058/km^{2} (2.739/sq mi)
- Time zone: UTC+0 (GMT)

Bellen is a rural commune in the Ségou Cercle in the Ségou Region of Mali. It is the most northerly within the cercle and is sparsely populated with only nine villages in an area of approximately 3,189 square kilometres (1,231 sq mi). In the 2009 census, it had a population of 6,949. The chef-lieu is the village of Sagala which is 89 kilometres (55 mi) northwest of Ségou.
