= Diouna =

- Commune and village
- Location in Mali
- Coordinates: 13°25′57″N 5°49′10″W
- Country: Mali
- Region: Ségou Region
- Cercle: Ségou Cercle

Area
  - Total: 175 km^{2} (68 sq mi)

Population (2009 census)
  - Total: 9,244
  - Density: 52.8/km^{2} (137/sq mi)
- Time zone: UTC+0 (GMT)

Diouna is a village and rural commune in the Cercle of Ségou in the Ségou Region of southern-central Mali. The commune includes 11 villages in an area of approximately 175 square kilometers. In the 2009 census it had a population of 9,244. The chef-lieu of the commune is the village of Diouna which lies 49 km east of Ségou.
