= Kamiandougou =

- Commune
- Location in Mali
- Coordinates: 13°41′58″N 5°31′6″W
- Country: Mali
- Region: Ségou Region
- Cercle: Ségou Cercle

Area
  - Total: 311 km^{2} (120 sq mi)

Population (2009 census)
  - Total: 14,313
  - Density: 46.0/km^{2} (119/sq mi)
- Time zone: UTC+0 (GMT)

Kamiandougou is a rural commune in the Cercle of Ségou in the Ségou Region of Mali. The commune contains 18 villages in an area of approximately 311 square kilometers. In the 2009 census it had a population of 14313. The administrative center (chef-lieu) is the village of Nonongo which lies 94 km east-northeast of Ségou.
