= Fatiné =

- Commune and village
- Location in Mali
- Coordinates: 13°34′34″N 5°23′0″W
- Country: Mali
- Region: Ségou Region
- Cercle: Ségou Cercle

Area
  - Total: 1,006 km^{2} (388 sq mi)

Population (2009 census)
  - Total: 25,161
  - Density: 25.01/km^{2} (64.78/sq mi)
- Time zone: UTC+0 (GMT)
  - Summer (DST): [[UTC13 34 34 -5 22 60]]

Fatiné is a rural commune in the Cercle of Ségou in the Ségou Region of Mali. The commune includes 29 villages in an area of approximately 1006 square kilometers. In the 2009 census it had a population of 25,161. The Bani River runs along the southern boundary of the commune. The administrative center (chef-lieu) is the village of Fatiné Marka.
