= N'Koumandougou =

- Commune
- Location in Mali
- Coordinates: 13°55′44″N 6°12′27″W
- Country: Mali
- Region: Ségou Region
- Cercle: Ségou Cercle

Area
  - Total: 2,040 km^{2} (790 sq mi)

Population (2009 census)
  - Total: 14,237
  - Density: 6.98/km^{2} (18.1/sq mi)
- Time zone: UTC+0 (GMT)

N'Koumandougou is a rural commune in the Cercle of Ségou in the Ségou Region of Mali. The commune contains 15 villages in an area of approximately 2,040 square kilometers. In the 2009 census it had a population of 14,237. The chef-lieu is the village of Doura.
