= Baguindadougou =

- Commune
- Location in Mali
- Coordinates: 13°35′41″N 6°9′26″W
- Country: Mali
- Region: Ségou Region
- Cercle: Ségou Cercle
- Admin centre (chef-lieu): Markanibougou

Area
  - Total: 702 km^{2} (271 sq mi)

Population (2009 census)
  - Total: 10,371
  - Density: 14.8/km^{2} (38.3/sq mi)
- Time zone: UTC+0 (GMT)

Baguindadougou is a rural commune in the Cercle of Ségou in the Ségou Region of Mali. The commune includes 14 villages in an area of approximately 702 square kilometers. In the 2009 census it had a population was 10,371. The administrative center (chef-lieu) is the village of Markanibougou.
