= Sakoïba =

- Commune and village
- Location in Mali
- Coordinates: 13°18′43″N 6°16′48″W
- Country: Mali
- Region: Ségou Region
- Cercle: Ségou Cercle

Area
  - Total: 360 km^{2} (140 sq mi)

Population (2009 census)
  - Total: 18,282
  - Density: 51/km^{2} (130/sq mi)
- Time zone: UTC+0 (GMT)

Sakoïba is a village and rural commune in the Cercle of Ségou in the Ségou Region of southern-central Mali. The commune contains 23 villages in an area of approximately 360 square kilometers. In the 2009 census it had a population of 18,282. The village of Sakoïba, the chef-lieu of the commune is 16 km south of Ségou.
