= Massala, Mali =

Massala
- Commune and village
- Location in Mali
- Coordinates: 13°16′55″N 6°30′7″W
- Country: Mali
- Region: Ségou Region
- Cercle: Ségou Cercle

Area
  - Total: 89 km^{2} (34 sq mi)

Population (2009 census)
  - Total: 6,547
  - Density: 74/km^{2} (190/sq mi)
- Time zone: UTC+0 (GMT)

Massala is a village and rural commune in the Cercle of Ségou in the Ségou Region of southern-central Mali. The commune includes 8 villages in an area of approximately 89 square kilometers. In the 2009 census it had a population of 6,547.
