= Sibila =

- Commune and village
- Location in Mali
- Coordinates: 13°46′40″N 5°52′40″W
- Country: Mali
- Region: Ségou Region
- Cercle: Ségou Cercle

Area
  - Total: 280 km^{2} (110 sq mi)

Population (2009 census)
  - Total: 19,185
  - Density: 69/km^{2} (180/sq mi)
- Time zone: UTC+0 (GMT)

Sibila is a village and rural commune in the Cercle of Ségou in the Ségou Region of southern-central Mali. The commune contains 15 villages in an area of approximately 280 square kilometers. In the 2009 census it had a population of 19,185.

Sibila was the seat of the small kingdom of Sana or Sanadougou, originally ruled from nearby Sana Madougou ruled by a branch of the Traore dynasty. Abderrahmane al-Sa'di, author of the Tarikh al-Sudan, visited the kingdom in 1643. The town was sacked by Bambara mercenaries in 1645.
