= Souba =

- Commune and village
- Location in Mali
- Coordinates: 13°24′50″N 6°35′50″W
- Country: Mali
- Region: Ségou Region
- Cercle: Ségou Cercle

Area
  - Total: 1,104 km^{2} (426 sq mi)

Population (2009 census)
  - Total: 17,961
  - Density: 16.27/km^{2} (42.14/sq mi)
- Time zone: UTC+0 (GMT)

Souba is a village and rural commune in the Cercle of Ségou in the Ségou Region of southern-central Mali. The commune contains 24 villages in an area of approximately 1,104 square kilometers. In the 2009 census it had a population of 17,961. The village of Souba, the chef-lieu of the commune, sits on the left (north) bank of the Niger River.

The Saako and Konare families were sent by the faamas of the Segou Empire to found Souba within the Kala province.
