= Dougabougou =

- Commune and town
- Location in Mali
- Coordinates: 13°49′7″N 6°7′8″W
- Country: Mali
- Region: Ségou Region
- Cercle: Ségou Cercle

Area
  - Total: 180 km^{2} (69 sq mi)

Population (2009 census)
  - Total: 29,208
  - Density: 160/km^{2} (420/sq mi)
- Time zone: UTC+0 (GMT)

Dougabougou is a small town and rural commune in the Cercle of Ségou in the Ségou Region of southern-central Mali. The commune covers an area of approximately 180 square kilometers and includes the town and 6 villages. In the 2009 census the population was 29,208. The town lies 20 km north of the Markala dam. Many of the inhabitants are employed in the production of sugar on land irrigated by the Office du Niger scheme. A Chinese-Malian company (Sukala SA) produces sugar in the town.
