= Pit fired pottery =

Method for firing pottery

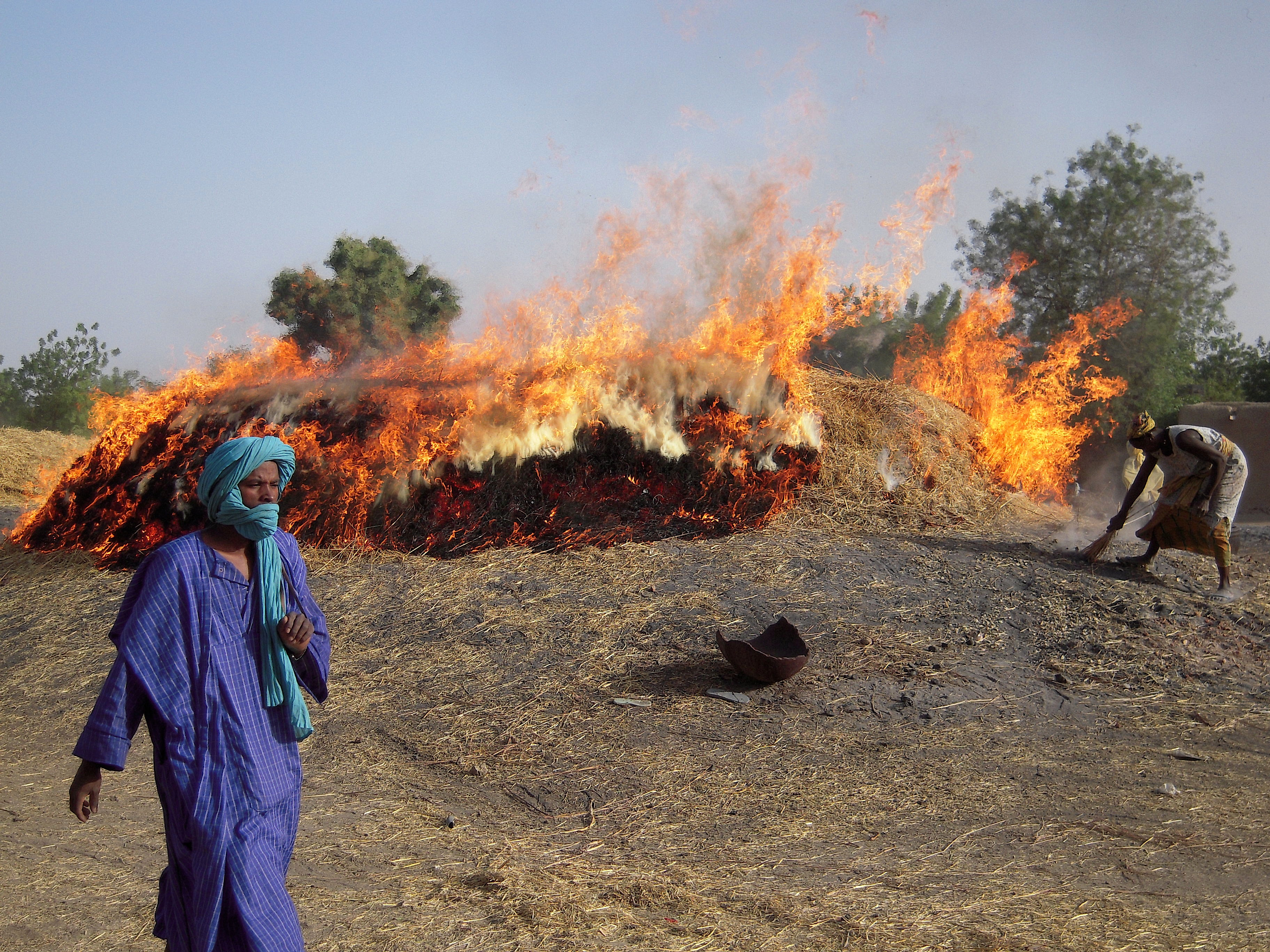
Pottery firing mound in Kalabougou, Mali, a very large form of firing pit.

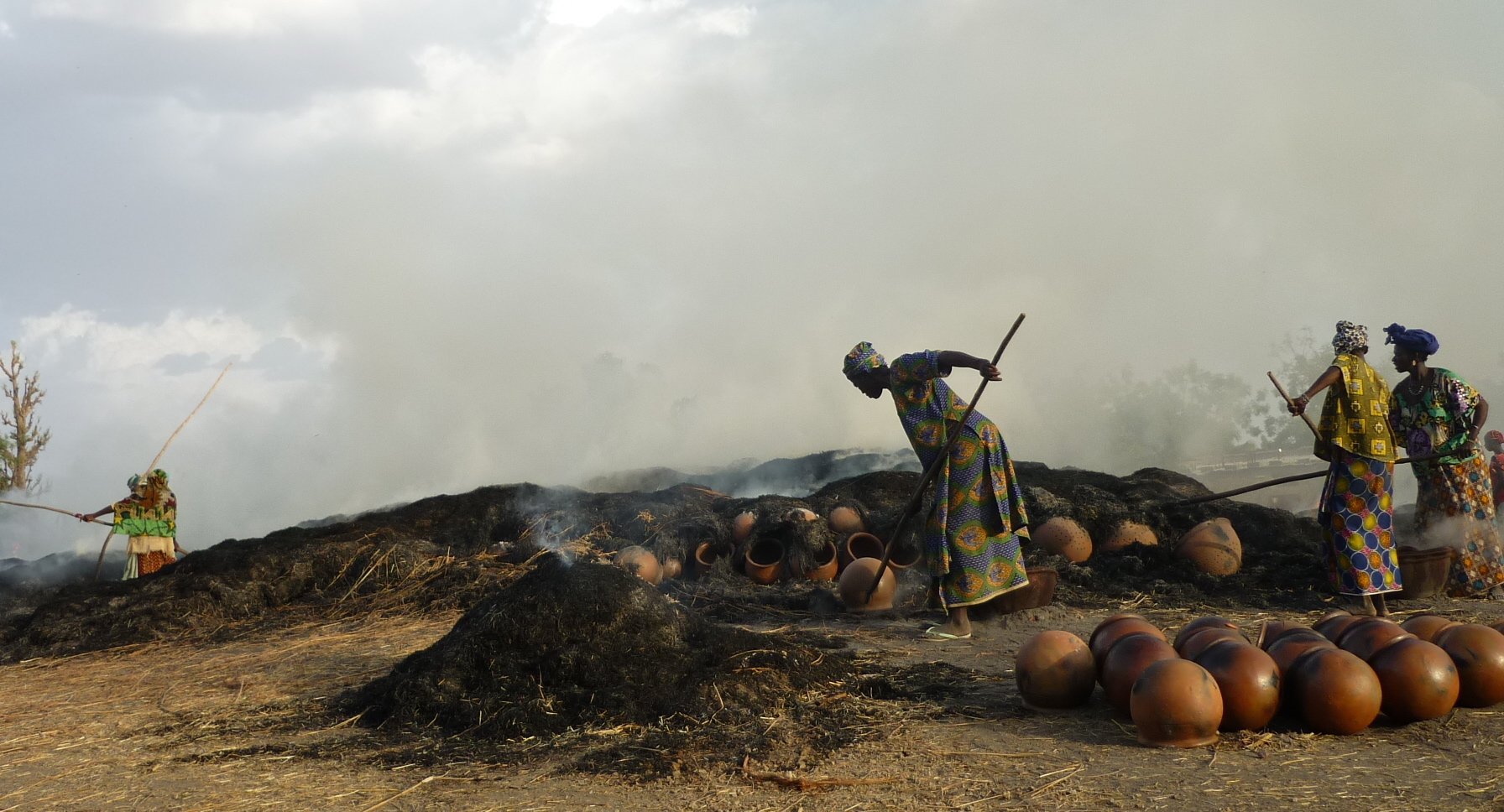
Removing the fired pots, Kalabougou, 2010

Pit firing is the oldest known method for the firing of pottery. Examples have been dated as early as 29,000–25,000 BCE, while the earliest known kiln dates to around 6000 BCE, and was found at the Yarim Tepe site in modern Iraq. Kilns allow higher temperatures to be reached, use fuel more efficiently, and have long replaced pit firing as the most widespread method of firing pottery. The technique still finds limited use amongst certain studio potters and in Africa.

Unfired pots are nestled together in a pit in the ground and are surrounded by combustible materials such as wood, shavings, dried manure, leaves, and sometimes metal oxides and salts to affect the surface of the pots. The top of the pit may be protected with moist clay, shards, larger pieces of wood, or metal baffles. The filled pit is then set on fire and carefully tended until most of the inner fuel has been consumed. At around 1,100 °C (2,010 °F) the maximum temperatures are moderate compared to other techniques used for pottery, and the pottery produced counts as earthenware. After cooling, pots are removed and cleaned; there may be patterns and colours left by ash and salt deposits. Pots may then be waxed and buffed to create a smooth glossy finish.

== Modern use ==
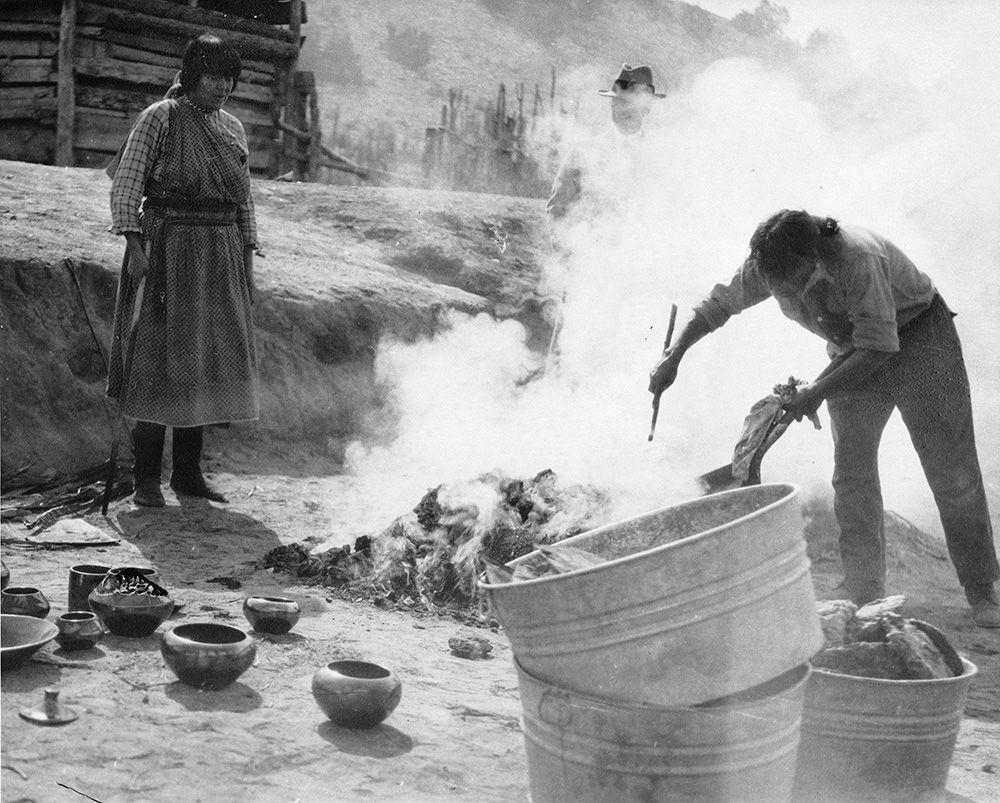
María and Julián Martinez pit firing blackware pottery at San Ildefonso Pueblo in New Mexico (c.1920)

Pit-firing continued in some parts of Africa until modern times. In Mali, a firing mound, a large version of the pit, is still used at Kalabougou to make pottery that is commercial, mainly made by the women of the village to be sold in the towns. Unfired pots are first brought to the place where a mound will be built, customarily by the women and girls of the village. The mound's foundation is made by placing sticks on the ground, then:

[...]pots are positioned on and amid the branches and then grass is piled high to complete the mound. Although the mound contains the pots of many women, who are related through their husbands' extended families, each woman is responsible for her own or her immediate family's pots within the mound. When a mound is completed and the ground around has been swept clean of residual combustible material, a senior potter lights the fire. A handful of grass is lit and the woman runs around the circumference of the mound touching the burning torch to the dried grass. Some mounds are still being constructed as others are already burning.

Pit-firing continued to be used by Pueblo potters, in particular in New Mexico, and other areas of the American Southwest. This pottery is handmade, and potters dig clay locally to produce their wares. Tempering agents like sand, volcanic ash, or pieces of ground-up broken pottery are combined with the clay to harden it during the firing process. The vessels are then pit-fired in the ground. Wood, dung, coal, or other locally sourced materials are used as fuel.

== See also ==
- Pueblo pottery
- Black-on-black ware
