= Kalabougou =

- Village
- Location in Mali
- Coordinates: 13°26′22″N 6°20′9″W
- Country: Mali
- Region: Ségou Region
- Cercle: Ségou Cercle
- Commune: Farako
- Time zone: UTC+1 (WAT)

Kalabougou is a Bambara village on the left bank of the Niger River in the Ségou Region of Mali.

Kalabougou is located across the Niger River from Ségou, and dates back to the Bamana Empire which ruled in the area from the seventeenth to the nineteenth centuries. The village is known for its craftsmanship, particularly pottery of which the women of the village are traditionally employed in. The potters of Kalabougou are major suppliers of pottery for sale in Bamako, approximately 150 miles (241 km) away, as well as to nearby Ségou.

The rest of the village is divided in trade between blacksmiths, known as numu, fishermen, (known as Somono) and the farmers.

== Gallery ==
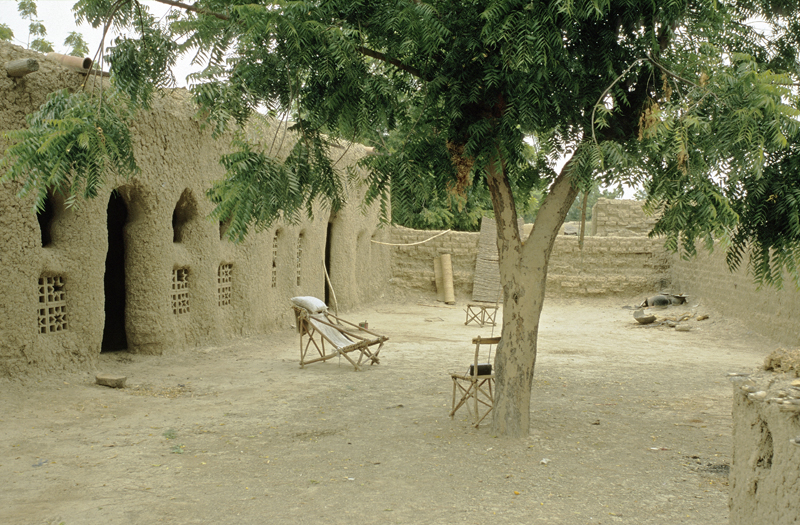

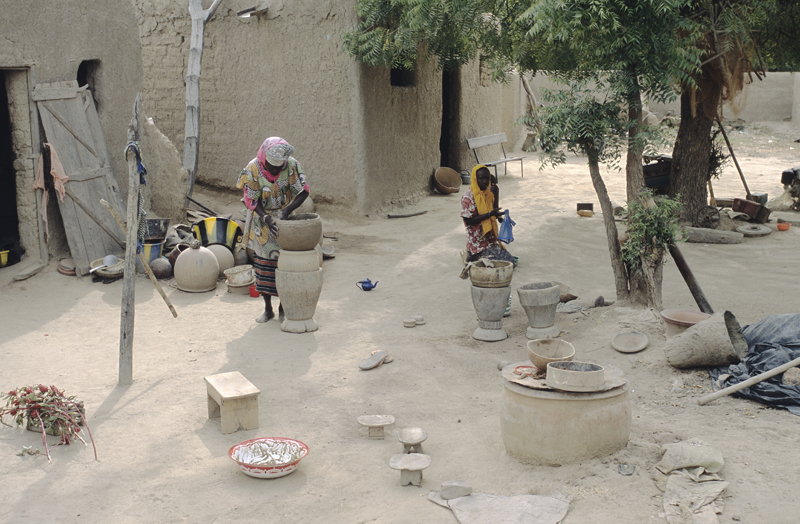

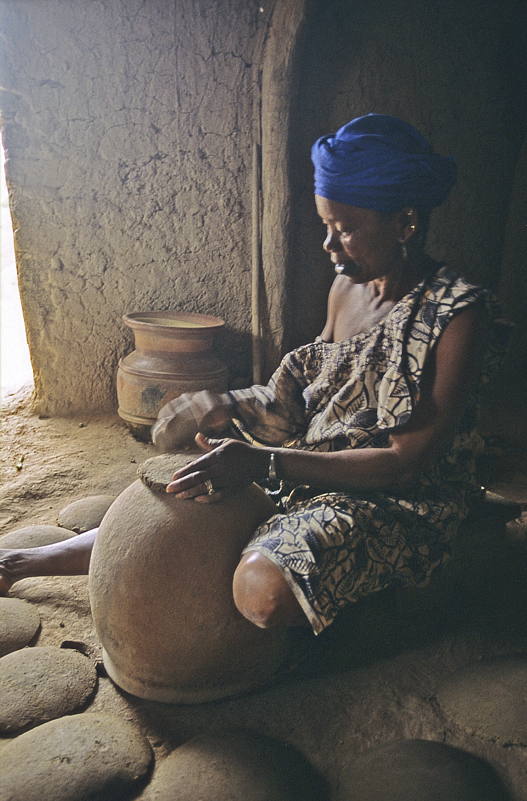

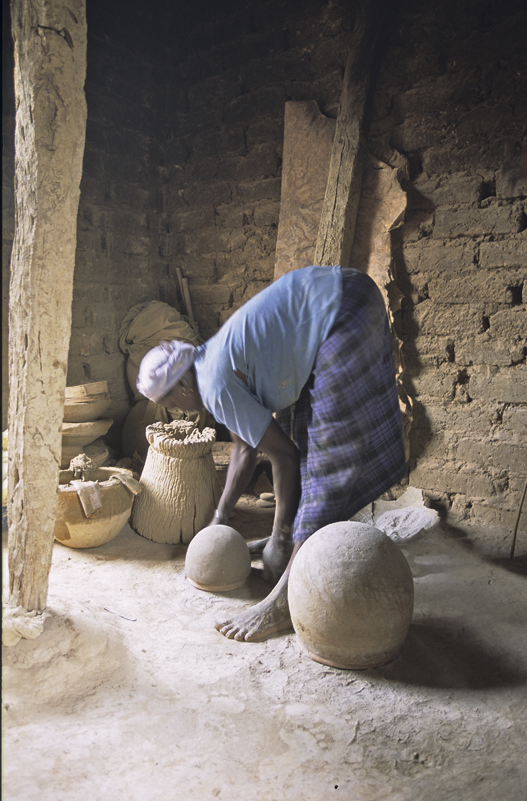

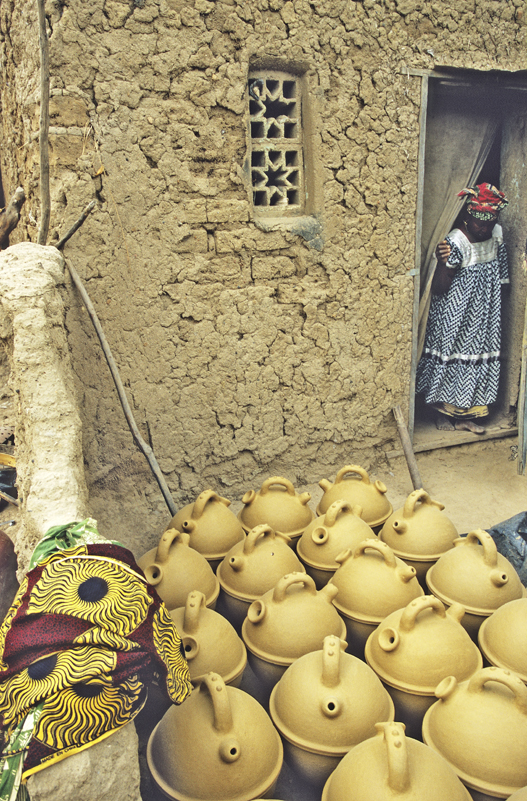

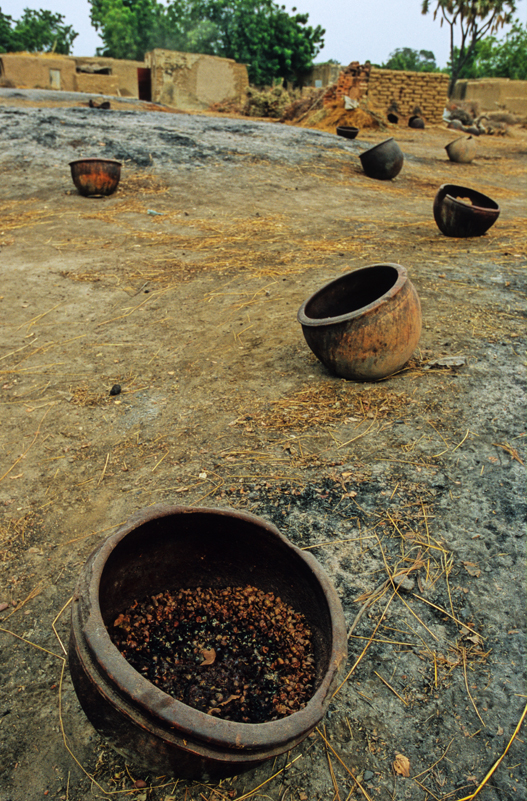

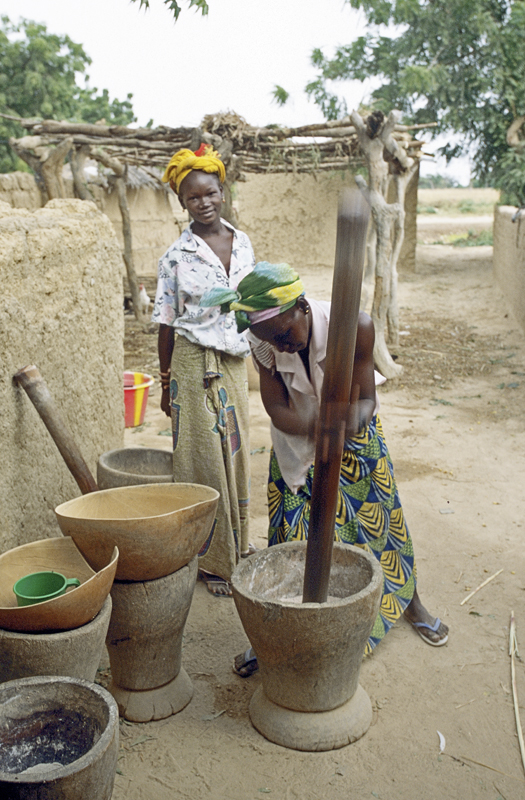

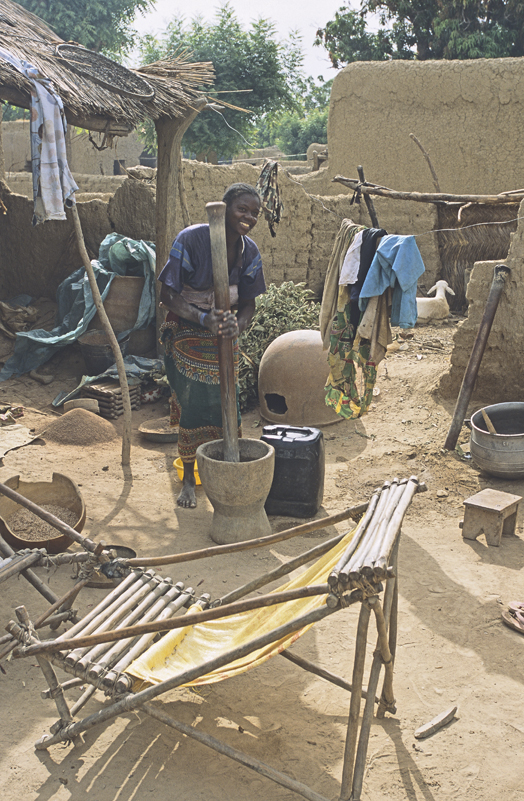
