= Sébougou =

- Commune and village
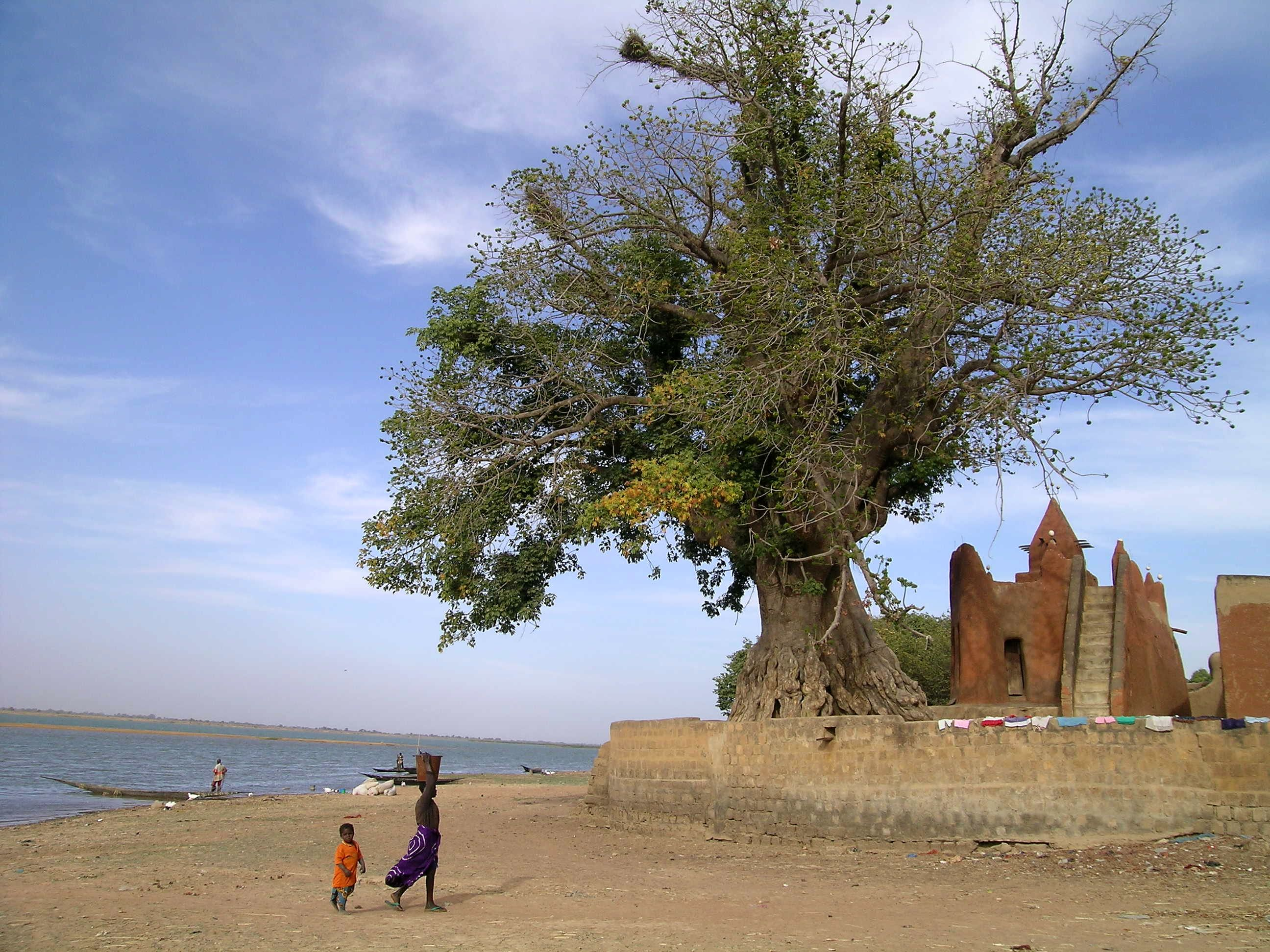
- River Mosque in Segoukoro village

- Location in Mali
- Coordinates: 13°25′5″N 6°18′25″W
- Country: Mali
- Region: Ségou Region
- Cercle: Ségou Cercle

Area
  - Total: 115 km^{2} (44 sq mi)

Population (2009 census)
  - Total: 16,175
  - Density: 141/km^{2} (364/sq mi)
- Time zone: UTC+0 (GMT)

Sébougou is a village and rural commune in the Cercle of Ségou in the Ségou Region of southern-central Mali. The commune contains 10 villages in an area of approximately 115 square kilometers. In the 2009 census it had a population of 16,175. The commune lies to the south of the River Niger and to the west of the urban commune of Ségou.
