= Pelengana =

- Commune and town
- Location in Mali
- Coordinates: 13°25′40″N 6°12′55″W
- Country: Mali
- Region: Ségou Region
- Cercle: Ségou Cercle

Area
  - Total: 359 km^{2} (139 sq mi)

Population (2009 census)
  - Total: 56,259
  - Density: 157/km^{2} (406/sq mi)
- Time zone: UTC+0 (GMT)

Pelengana (or Pélengana) is a small town and rural commune in the Cercle of Ségou in the Ségou Region of southern-central Mali. The commune contains the town and 25 villages in an area of approximately 359 square kilometers. In the 2009 census it had a population of 56,259. The town of Pelengana lies 5 km southeast of Ségou on the Route Nationale 6.
