= University of Ségou =

Coordinates: 13.4244°N 6.3030°W

- Université de Ségou
- Type: Public university
- Established: 2009
- Students: 1530 (in 2016)
- Location: Ségou, Mali
- Language: French
- Website: Official website

The University of Ségou is a public university in Mali, located in the city of Ségou.

== History ==
The University of Ségou was established by decree no. 09-128/PM-RM on 27 March 2009 but officially started its activities in January 2012.

== Structure ==
The University of Ségou is composed of three faculties:

- Faculty of Agronomy and Animal Medicine
- Faculty of Social Sciences
- Faculty of Engineering and Sciences (FAGES)

and the University Institute of Professional Training (IUFP Ségou)

== IUFP Ségou ==
The University Institute of Professional Training is responsible for professional training at the bac + 2 (DUT) and bac + 3 (LPRO) levels.

The list of available programs evolves based on the needs of the regional and national labor market. Currently, the programs include:

- Agro-Business
- Management Assistant
- Accounting Finance Audit
- Water, Environment, and Renewable Energies
- Computer Engineering and Telecommunications
- Hospitality Tourism
