= Dioro, Mali =

Dioro
- Commune and town
- Location in Mali
- Coordinates: 13°41′9″N 5°50′3″W
- Country: Mali
- Region: Ségou Region
- Cercle: Ségou Cercle

Area
  - Total: 586 km^{2} (226 sq mi)

Population (2009 census)
  - Total: 47,876
  - Density: 81.7/km^{2} (212/sq mi)
- Time zone: UTC+0 (GMT)

Dioro is a town and rural commune in the Cercle of Ségou in the Ségou Region of southern-central Mali. The commune extends over an area of approximately 586 square kilometers on the right bank of the Niger River and includes the town and 29 of the surrounding villages. In the 2009 census the commune had a population of 47,876. The town of Dioro is located 57 km northeast of Ségou on the bank of the river.
