= Farako, Ségou =

Farako
- Commune and town
- Location in Mali
- Coordinates: 13°24′37″N 6°23′12″W
- Country: Mali
- Region: Ségou Region
- Cercle: Ségou Cercle

Population (2009 census)
  - Total: 17,570
- Time zone: UTC+0 (GMT)

Farako is a small town and rural commune in the Cercle of Ségou in the Ségou Region of southern-central Mali. The commune lies on the north bank of the Niger River and contains 11 settlements in an area of 200 square kilometers. In the 2009 census it had a population of 17,570. The town of Farako is the chef-lieu of the commune.

Farako was an important military garrison town under the Segou Empire. It was one of the main headquarters of the Bambara resistance to the Toucouleur Empire from 1862 to 1891.
