= Somono =

Ethnic group in Mali

Somono people
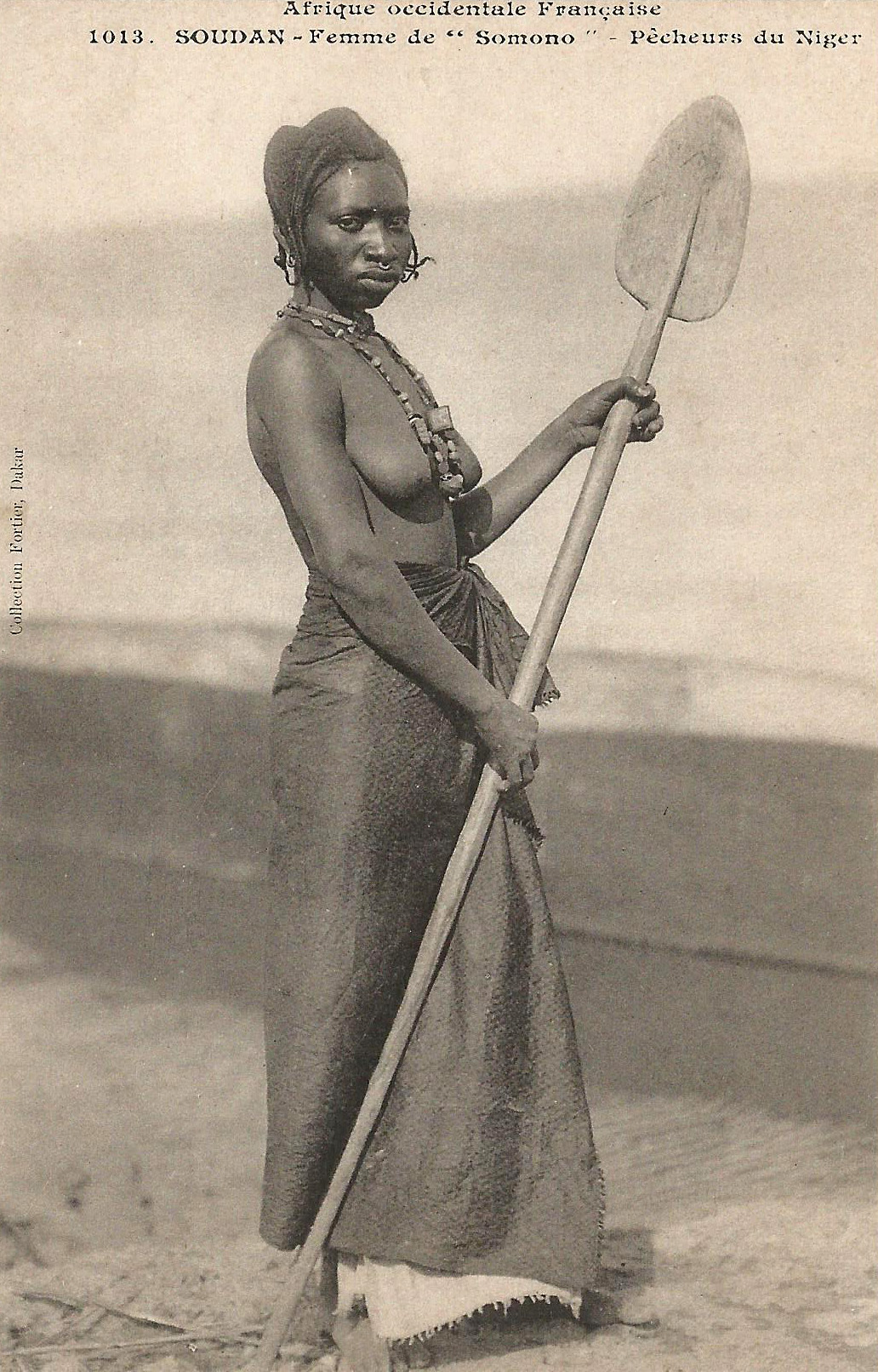
- Somono woman on the banks of the River Niger(photo: Fortier)

Total population
- 67,186 (0.3%) 0.3% (including those of ancestral descent)

Regions with significant populations

Languages
- Somono

Religion
- Islam

Related ethnic groups
- Bambara people

The Somono are an ethnic group in Mali. It is made up of a few tens of thousands of fishermen living around the Niger River. They are related to the Bambara people and share most of their customs.

== History ==
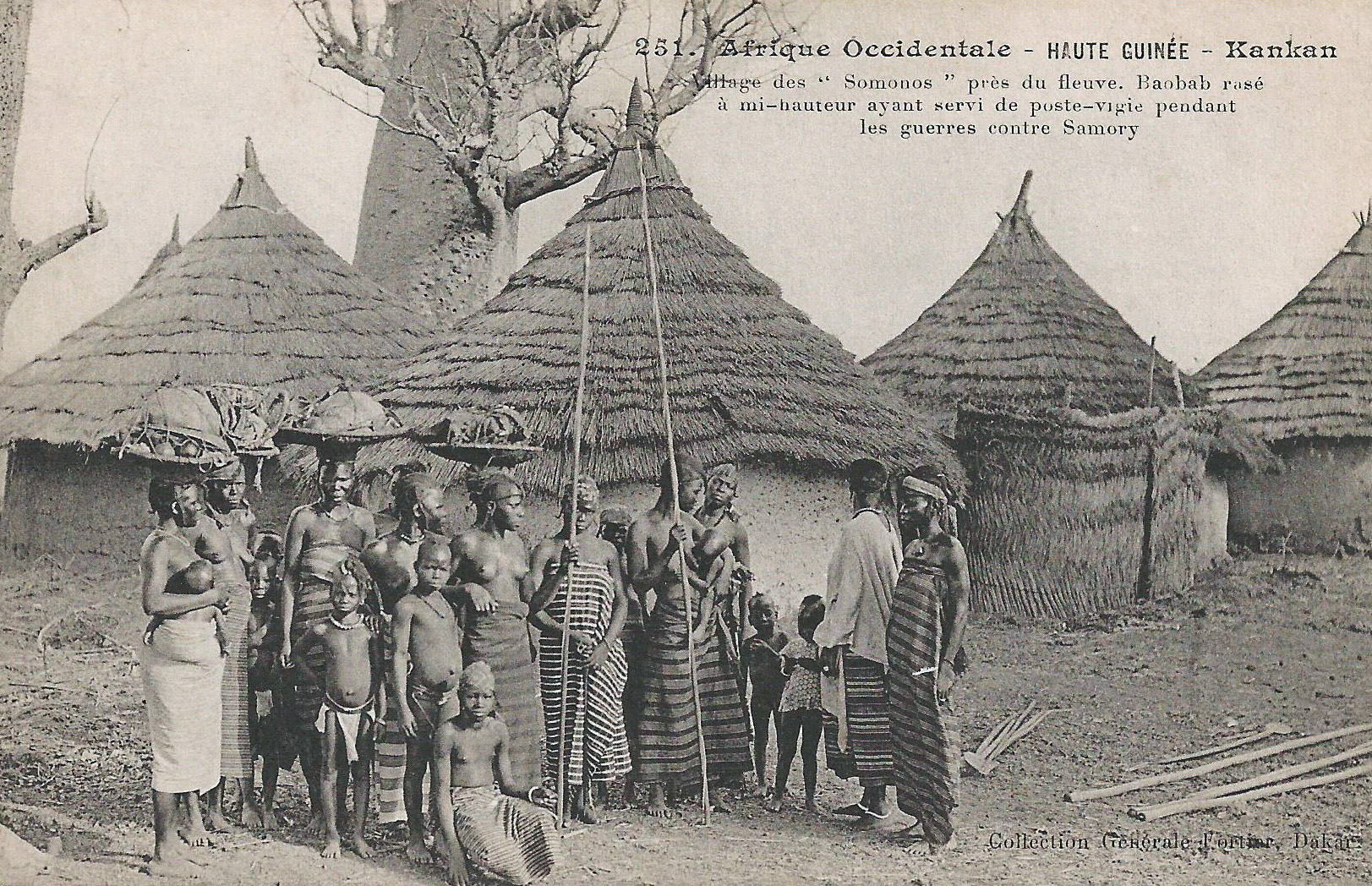
Somono village near the river in Kankan, Guinéa. (circa 1905)

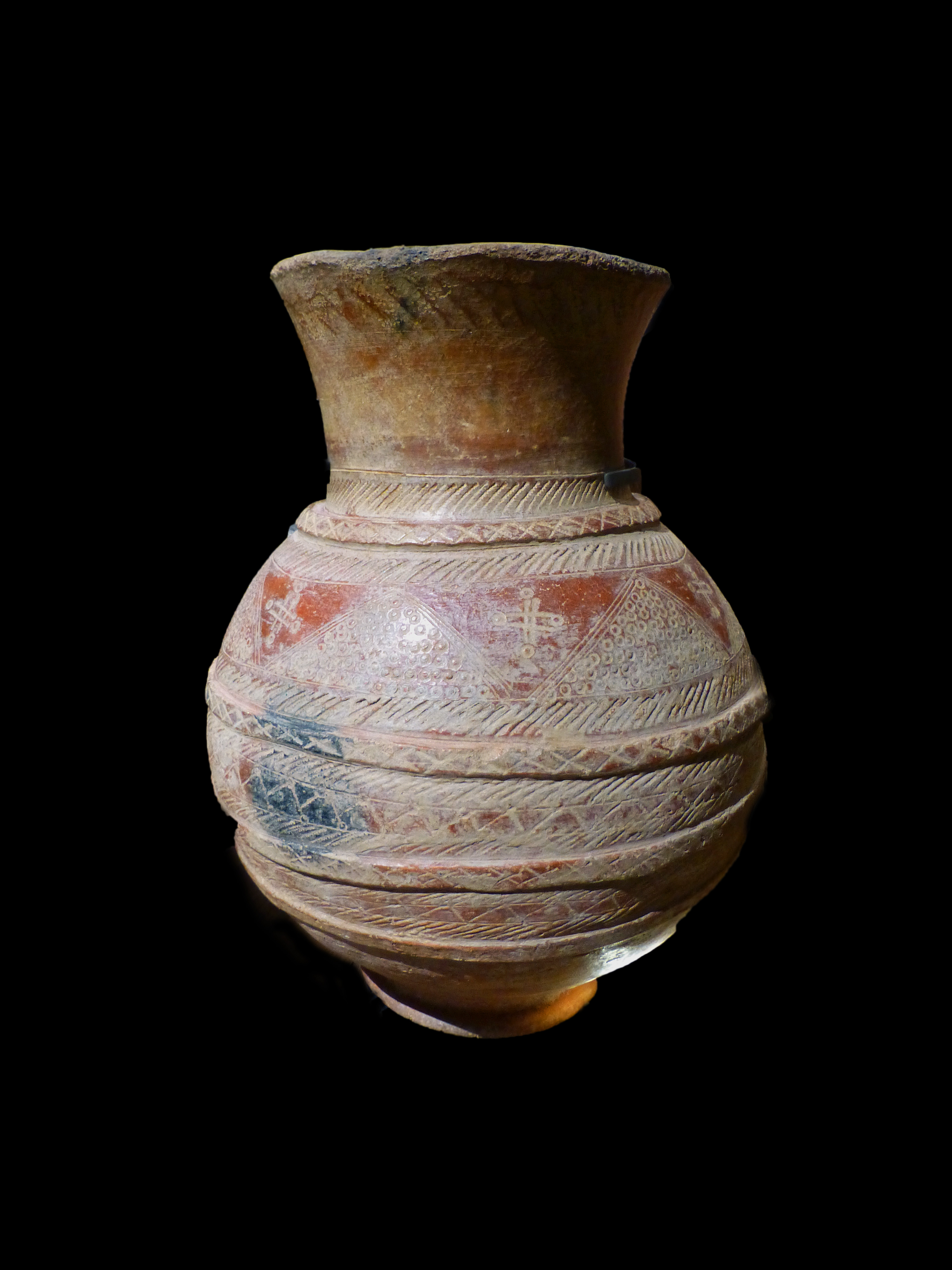
Bozo-Somono jar (Confluences Museum).

Biton Coulibaly entrusted them with a war fleet to expand his kingdom in the 18th century.

They were conquered by the Toucouleurs of Omar Saidou Tall in the 19th century.

In principle, they extended from Bamako to Dioro, but some settled in Conakry at the beginning of the 20th century.

== Language ==
Their language, of the same name, is a dialect of Bambara.

== Demographics ==
According to the 2022 Census, there were 67,186 people in Mali.

== Culture ==
The Somono share most of the customs of the Bambaras.

=== Craftsmanship ===
The Somono are highly skilled in pottery and canoe construction, and also traditionally master ironwork, which makes them indispensable to the Bozos.

The Somono contributed to the introduction of the drift net technique in Casamance.

=== Religion ===
The Somono adopted the Islamic traditions following their conquest by the Toucouleurs of Omar Saidou Tall.

== Bibliography ==
- (en) Mary Jo Arnoldi, « Sòmonò puppet masquerades in Kirango, Mali », in African Arts (Los Angeles), 34 (1) printemps 2001, p. 72-77
- Georges R. Celis et Yaya T.Coulibaly, Métallurgies traditionnelles du fer Sénoufo, Malinké et Somono, Côte d'Ivoire, Burkina-Faso et Mali, Musée royal de l'Afrique centrale, Tervuren, 2001, 192 p. ISBN 90-75894-39-2
- (en) David C. Conrad, Somono Bala of the Upper Niger: river people, charismatic bards, and mischievous music in a West African culture, Brill, Leyde, Boston, Cologne, 2002, 160 p. ISBN 90-04-12185-4
- Kevin de la Croix, Amadou Dao, Luc Ferry, Frédéric Landy, Nadine Muther et Didier Martin, « Les systèmes de pêches collectives fluviales somono dans le Manden (Mali). Un révélateur territorial et social unique en sursis sur le Niger supérieur », Dynamiques Environnementales. Journal International des géosciences et de l’environnement, n°32, second semestre 2013, p. 124-143. [lire en ligne]
- Jacques Daget, « La pêche à Diafarabé : étude monographique », in Bulletin de l'Institut français d'Afrique noire, série B, T. 18, nos 1–2, 1956
- (de) Thomas Krings, Agrarwissen bäuerlicher Gruppen in Mali, Westafrika : standortgerechte Elemente in den Landnutzungssystemen der Senoufo, Bwa, Dogon und Somono, D. Reimer, Berlin, 1991, 301 p. ISBN 3-496-00409-6
- Paul Marty, « L'islam somono », in Études sur l'Islam et les tribus du Soudan, tome 4, E. Leroux, Paris, 1920, p. 47-62, available at Gallica

== See also ==
- List of ethnic groups of Africa
