= San, Mali =

San
- Commune and town
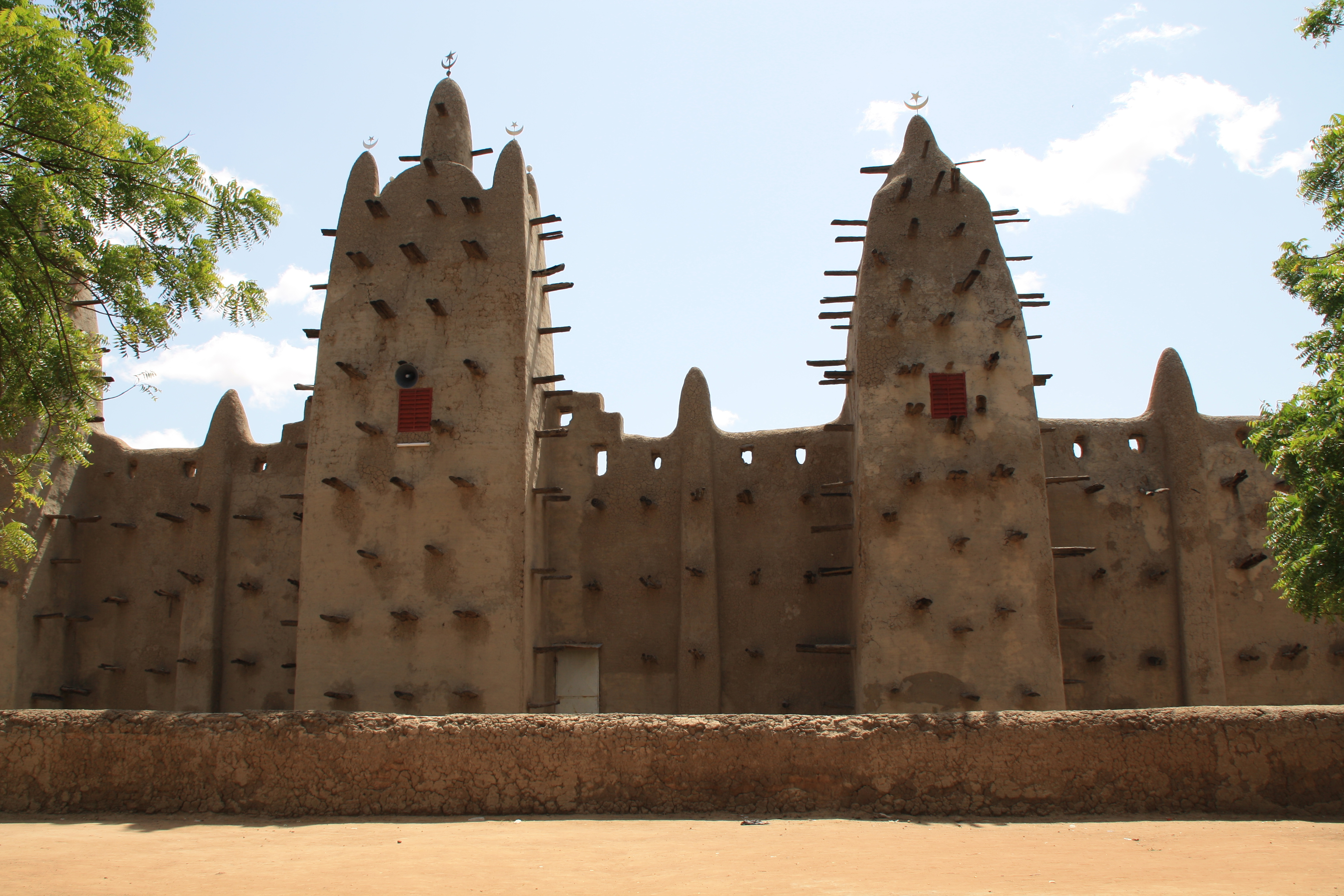
- San Mosque

- Location in Mali
- Coordinates: 13°18′N 4°54′W
- Country: Mali
- Region: Ségou Region
- Cercle: San Cercle
- Beginning of urbanization: c. 1400

Area
  - Total: 155 km^{2} (60 sq mi)
- Elevation: 279 m (915 ft)

Population (2009 census)
  - Total: 68,078
  - Density: 439/km^{2} (1,140/sq mi)
- Time zone: UTC+0 (GMT)

San (Bambara: ߛߊߣ tr. San) is an urban commune, town and capital of the Cercle of San in the Ségou Region of Mali. The town lies 10 kilometres or 6 miles south of the Bani River. In the 2009 census, the commune had a population of 68,078.

== History ==
The area of San was for centuries a fishing camp for Bozo people. Around 1400 CE, a trade city dependent on the kingdom of Daa began to develop at a crucial ford over the Bani linking the Inner Niger Delta to the goldfields to the south, although oral traditions conflict on whether Marka from Dia or Dyula from Djenne were responsible. The town was attacked by Askia Ishaq I of the Songhai Empire in 1542. At the time it may have been known under the name 'Sama', although the name could also refer to Sama Foulala.

In 1690 San, a prosperous market town, was conquered by Biton Coulibaly and integrated into the growing Bamana Empire. In 1739, Famaghan Ouattara of the Kong Empire intervened in a Bamana civil war and destroyed the town. It was later rebuilt somewhat further north. San was incorporated into the Massina Empire by Cheikhou Amadou in the 1830s, and became a theocratic state. For this reason, when El-Hajj Omar Tall destroyed Massina in the 1860s he spared the city.

The Almamy of San was forced to sign a protectorate treaty with France in 1891. The city's independence was soon curtailed by the colonial administration, however. In 1915, the area witnessed a series of rebellions against forced recruitment into the French army and forced labor during World War I, and the town's population plummeted.

San was elevated to the status of commune under the French colonial regime in November 1955.

== Economy and Culture ==
San is the center for production of bògòlanfini, a traditional Malian fabric. It also is a center of horse breeding. The main engine of the economy, however, is trade on the main highways that pass through town and the rice fields along the Bani river.

Attractions in the town include the San Museum and the Sudanic-style mosque. The yearly Sanke Mo fishing festival takes place every June, and has been officially classified as part of the national cultural patrimony of Mali.

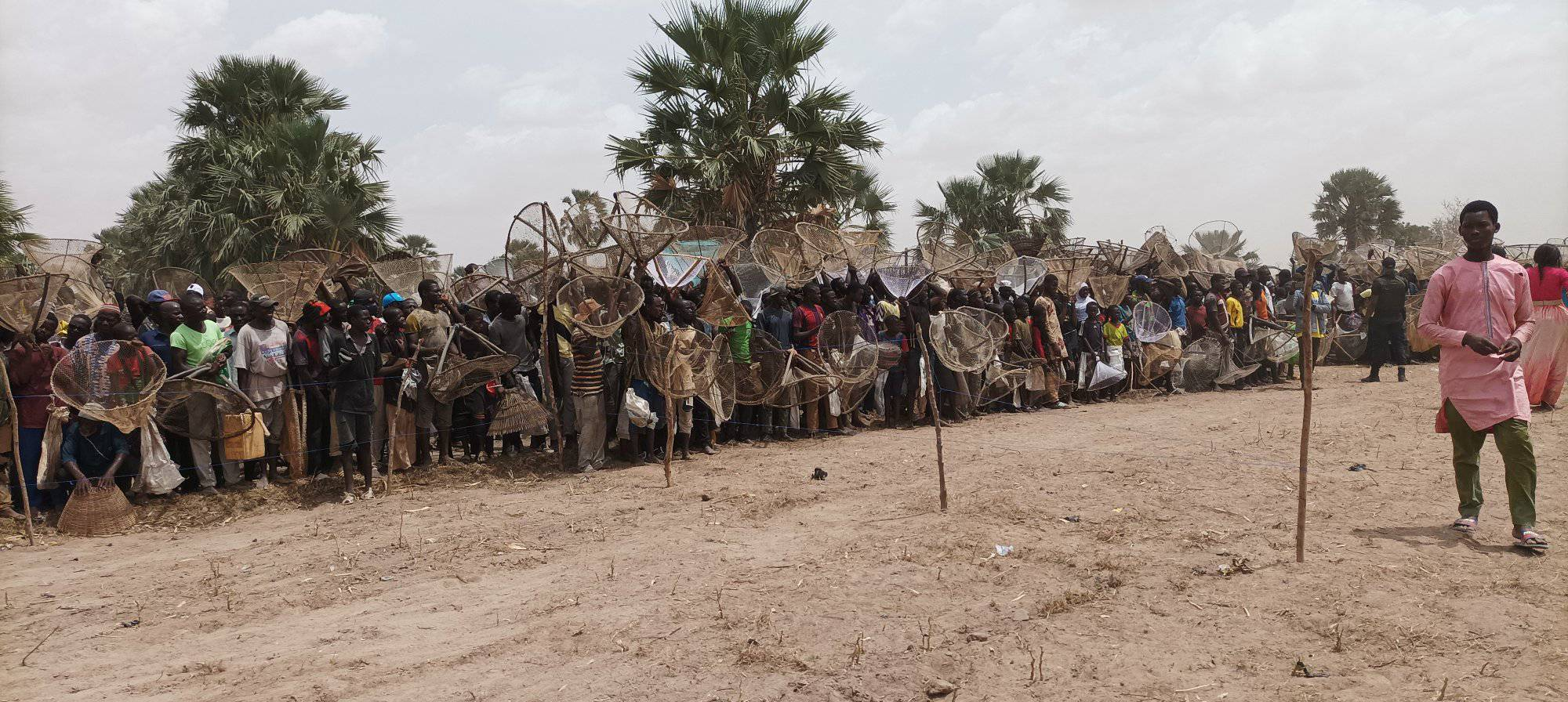
An event during the 2018 Sanké mô festival.

== Climate ==
San has a hot semi-arid climate (Köppen BSh) with a wet season from late May to early October. Almost no rain falls during the long dry season from early October to late May, while afternoon temperatures are sweltering except in December and January, when they are merely hot in the afternoon and pleasant to warm in the mornings.

Climate data for San (1991–2020)
Month	Jan	Feb	Mar	Apr	May	Jun	Jul	Aug	Sep	Oct	Nov	Dec	Year
Record high °C (°F)	—	—	44.6 (112.3)	45.2 (113.4)	45.7 (114.3)	—	—	—	—	—	—	39.7 (103.5)	45.7 (114.3)
Mean daily maximum °C (°F)	31.5 (88.7)	34.9 (94.8)	38.4 (101.1)	41.4 (106.5)	42.2 (108.0)	40.6 (105.1)	35.9 (96.6)	33.4 (92.1)	35.6 (96.1)	38.6 (101.5)	36.5 (97.7)	32.7 (90.9)	36.8 (98.2)
Daily mean °C (°F)	23.3 (73.9)	26.3 (79.3)	29.9 (85.8)	33.3 (91.9)	35.1 (95.2)	34.3 (93.7)	30.7 (87.3)	28.6 (83.5)	29.8 (85.6)	30.9 (87.6)	27.8 (82.0)	24.3 (75.7)	29.5 (85.1)
Mean daily minimum °C (°F)	15.0 (59.0)	17.7 (63.9)	21.5 (70.7)	25.2 (77.4)	28.0 (82.4)	27.9 (82.2)	25.5 (77.9)	23.8 (74.8)	24.0 (75.2)	23.2 (73.8)	19.1 (66.4)	15.8 (60.4)	22.2 (72.0)
Average precipitation mm (inches)	0.2 (0.01)	0.1 (0.00)	0.4 (0.02)	1.3 (0.05)	12.2 (0.48)	35.3 (1.39)	116.3 (4.58)	162.2 (6.39)	74.8 (2.94)	14.3 (0.56)	0.2 (0.01)	0.2 (0.01)	417.5 (16.44)
Average precipitation days (≥ 1.0 mm)	0.2	0.1	0.3	0.5	2.7	5.5	10.4	12.5	7.9	3.0	0.2	0.1	43.4
Mean monthly sunshine hours	276.3	256.3	288.0	265.0	264.3	241.5	234.7	219.7	247.5	287.6	284.7	278.3	3,143.9
Source 1: NOAA
Source 2: Meteo Climat (sun, 1991-2020)

== Notable people ==
- Former President of Mali Bah Ndaw, born in San on 23 August 1950
- Historian and ethnologist Youssouf Tata Cisse

== Twin towns ==
San is twinned with:

- Chaumont, Haute-Marne, France, since 1995
