= Ségou Cercle =

- Cercle
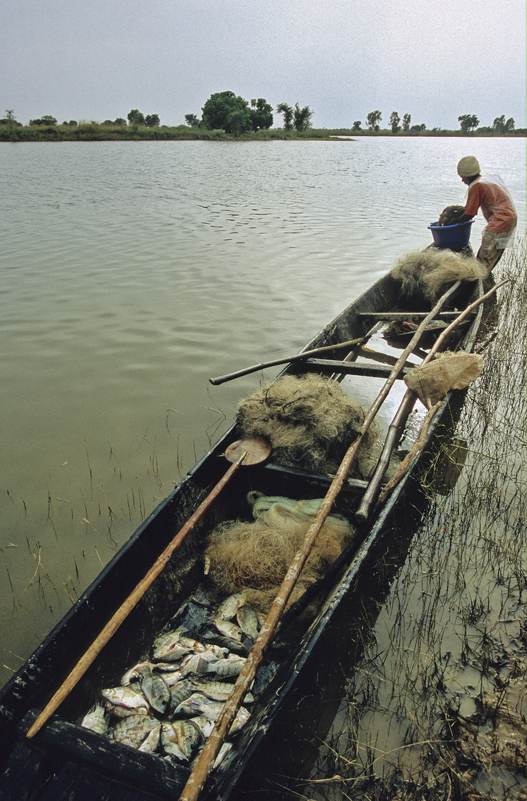
- Niger River at the village of Kalabougou near Ségou

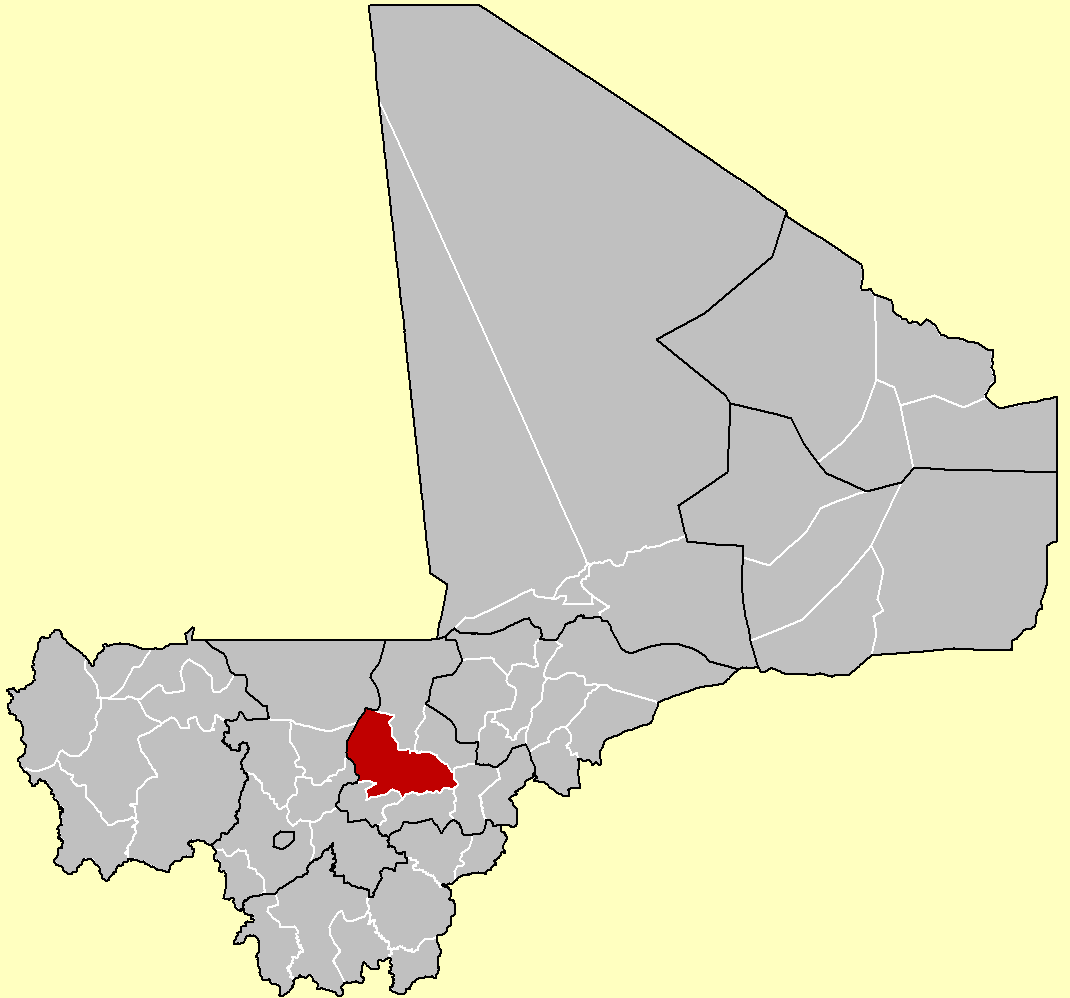
- Location of the Cercle of Ségou in Mali

- Location within Mali
- Coordinates: 13°35′N 6°15′W
- Country: Mali
- Region: Ségou Region
- Admin HQ (chef-lieu): Ségou

Area
  - Total: 10,844 km^{2} (4,187 sq mi)

Population (2009 census)
  - Total: 691,358
  - Density: 63.755/km^{2} (165.12/sq mi)
- Time zone: UTC+0 (GMT)

Ségou Cercle is an administrative subdivision of the Ségou Region of Mali. The administrative center (chef-lieu) is the town of Ségou.

The cercle is divided into 30 communes:

- Baguindadougou
- Bellen
- Boussin
- Cinzana
- Diédougou
- Diganibougou
- Dioro
- Diouna
- Dougabougou
- Farako
- Farakou Massa
- Fatiné
- Kamiandougou
- Katiéna
- Konodimini
- Markala
- Massala
- N'Gara
- N'Koumandougou
- Pelengana
- Sakoïba
- Sama Foulala
- Saminé
- Sansanding
- Sébougou
- Ségou
- Sibila
- Soignébougou
- Souba
- Togou

Different ethnicities are present in Ségou : Bambaras, Fula people, Miniankas, Bozos, Somonos, Dogons and Soninkés.
