= Bani River =

River in Mali

Coordinates: 14°29′N 4°12′W

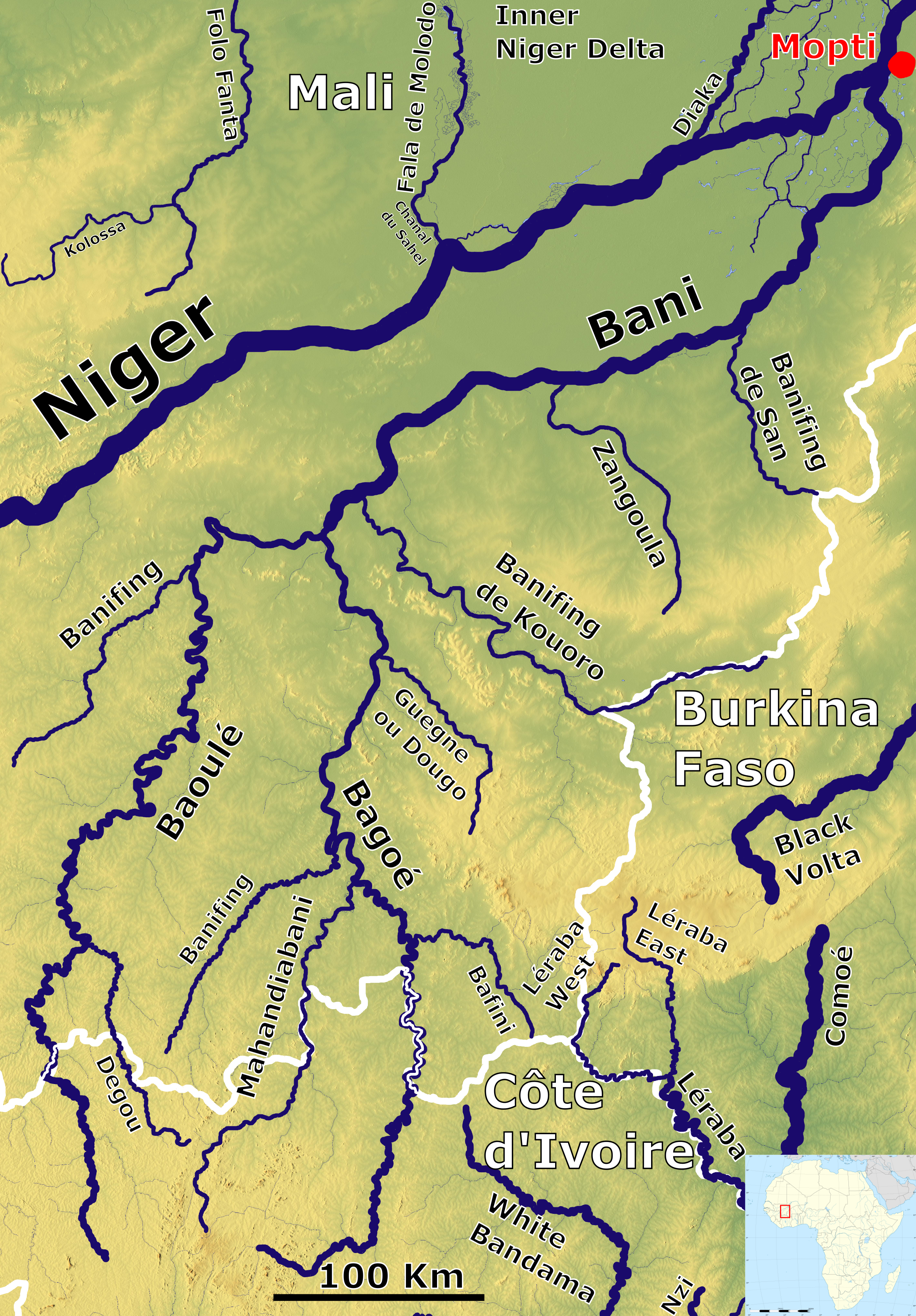
The Bani River system.

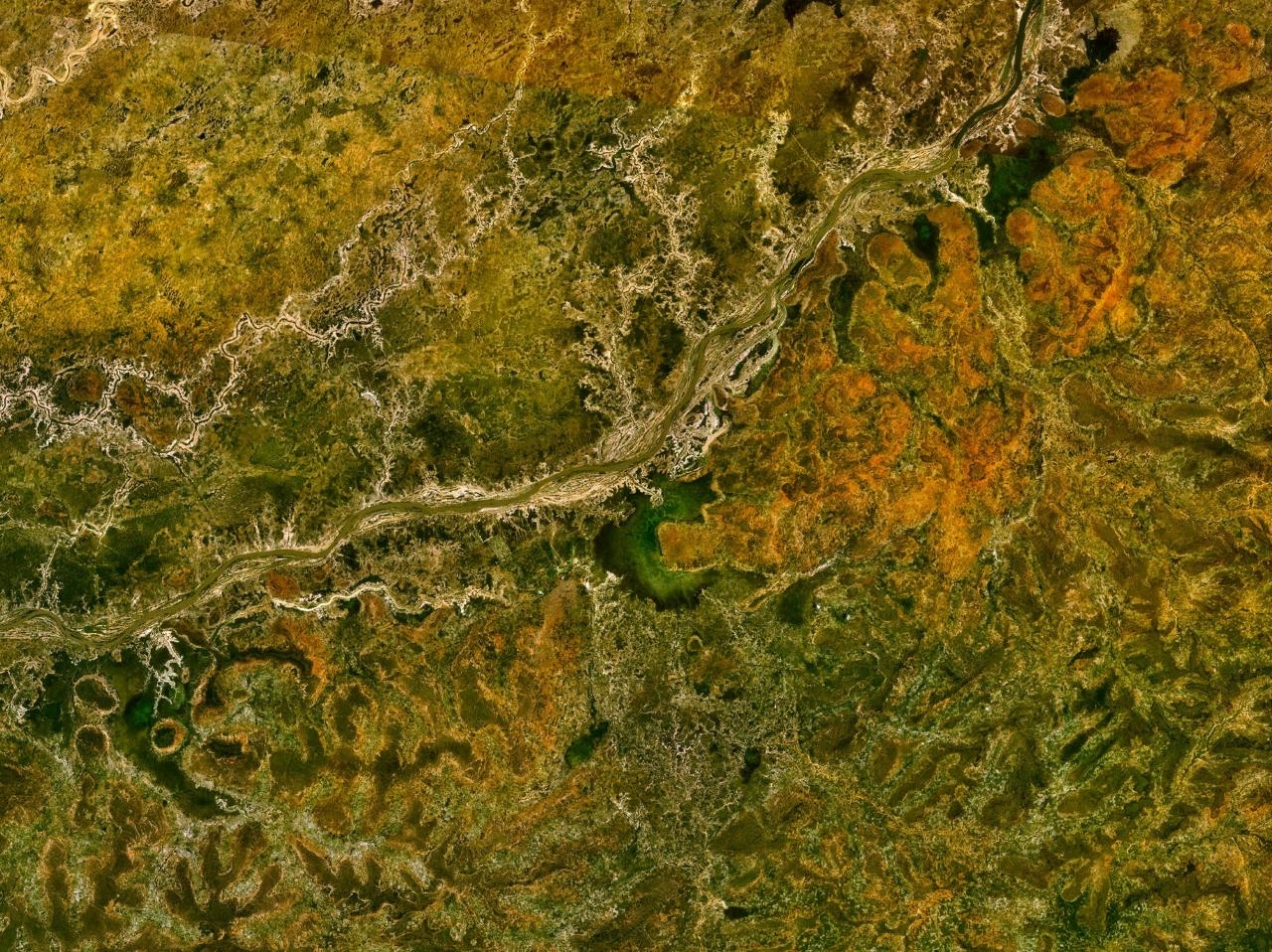
A satellite photo of the Bani. The town of San lies to the south of the river near the centre of the image. The Talo dam is near the edge on the left hand side.

Bani River at Douna

Average monthly flow (m^{3}/s) at the Douna hydrometric station over the period 1922–1994.

The Bani River is the principal tributary of the Niger River in Mali. The river is formed from the confluence of the Baoulé and Bagoé rivers some 160 km (99 mi) east of Bamako and it merges with the Niger near Mopti. Its length is about 1,100 km (680 mi).

== Geography ==
The Bani River has three main tributaries: the Baoulé that rises near Odienné in Côte d'Ivoire and passes just south of Bougouni, the Bagoé River that rises near Boundiali in Côte d'Ivoire and the Banifing-Lotio that drains the region around Sikasso. The drainage basin upstream of Douna has an area of 102,000 km^{2} (39,000 sq mi), 85% of which lies in southern Mali and 15% in northern Côte d'Ivoire.

The annual rainfall varies across the catchment basin with the southern area in Côte d'Ivoire receiving 1,500 mm (59 in) a year while the northern area around Douna receiving only 700 mm (28 in). For the period 1965-1995 the average annual rainfall for the basin was 1,100 mm (43 in). The rainfall is seasonal with most of the rain falling between May and October. The maximum rainfall occurs in August.

The discharge of the Bani River is also highly seasonal, with the maximum flow occurring at the end of September and very little flow between February and June. The river enters the Inland Niger Delta north of San and after the annual rains the river floods (the French word crue is sometimes used) and covers the floodplain.

There is a significant inter-annual variation in the rainfall and, as a consequence, in the quantity of water flowing in the river. The drought that started at the beginning of the 1970s led to a very large reduction in the flow and up to the present time the volumes are still much lower than those observed in the 1950s and 1960s. The reduction in the flow of the river was much greater than the reduction in the rainfall. The average rainfall for 1981-1989 was 20% less than for 1961-1970 while the discharge of the river was reduced by 75%. The effect of the reduced rainfall was less extreme for other tributaries of the Niger. Over the same period the catchment basin of the Upper Niger suffered a similar 20% reduction in rainfall but the readings at the Koulikoro gauge station were only reduced to 50% of the earlier values. Because of the accumulated groundwater deficit, even in a year with high rainfall, the discharge of the Bani River is less than in the wet decades of the 1950s and 1960s.

== Talo Dam ==
In 2006 the Talo Dam was constructed to irrigate parts of the floodplain to the south of the river near the town of San. Prior to the construction of the dam, these areas were only fully flooded in very wet years, the most recent of which occurred in 1967. The dam is located 43 km (27 mi) west of San, 66 km (41 mi) downstream of Douna and 110 km (68 mi) upstream of Djenné. The dam acts as a weir in that water can flow over the top of the retaining wall. The construction of the dam was highly controversial. The environmental impact assessment commissioned by the African Development Bank was criticised for not fully taking into account the hydrological impact downstream of the dam.

The retaining wall is 5 m (16 ft) high and 295 m (968 ft) in length, creating a reservoir with a capacity to retain 0.18 km^{3} (0.043 cu mi) of water. This volume represents 1.3% of the average annual discharge of the river (over the period 1952-2002 the average discharge was 13.4 km^{3} (3.2 cu mi). A downstream flow of 10 m^{3}/s (350 cu ft/s) can be maintained during the dry season by opening a sluice gate. From the published information it is unclear how much of the total discharge will be diverted for irrigation and, of the diverted water, how much will drain back into the river. The downstream effect of the dam will be to delay the arrival of the annual flood and to reduce its intensity.

== Djenné Dam ==
In May 2009 the African Development Bank approved funding for an irrigation dam/weir to be built on the Bani near Soala, a village situated 12 km (7.5 mi) south of Djenné. The dam is one element in a 6-year US$66 million program that also includes the building of a dam on the Sankarani River near Kourouba and the extension of the area irrigated by the Talo dam. The proposed Djenné dam will retain 0.3 km^{3} (0.072 cu mi) of water, significantly more than the Talo dam. It will allow the "controlled flooding" of 14,000 ha of the Pondori floodplain (on the left bank of the river to the south of Djenné) to allow the cultivation of rice and the irrigation of an additional 5000 ha for growing 'floating grass' (Echinochloa stagnina know locally as bourgou) for animal feed.

The effects of the dams on the flooding of the Inland Niger Delta downstream of Mopti are expected to be modest, as the discharge of the Bani is only one third of that of the Niger: for the period 1952-2002 the average flow at Douna was 424 m^{3}/s (15,000 cu ft/s) compared with 1,280 m^{3}/s (45,000 cu ft/s) for the Niger at Koulikoro.

Average annual flow of the Bani River (m^{3}/s) at the Douna hydrographic station
