= Ségou =

Commune and town in Ségou, Mali

- Commune and town
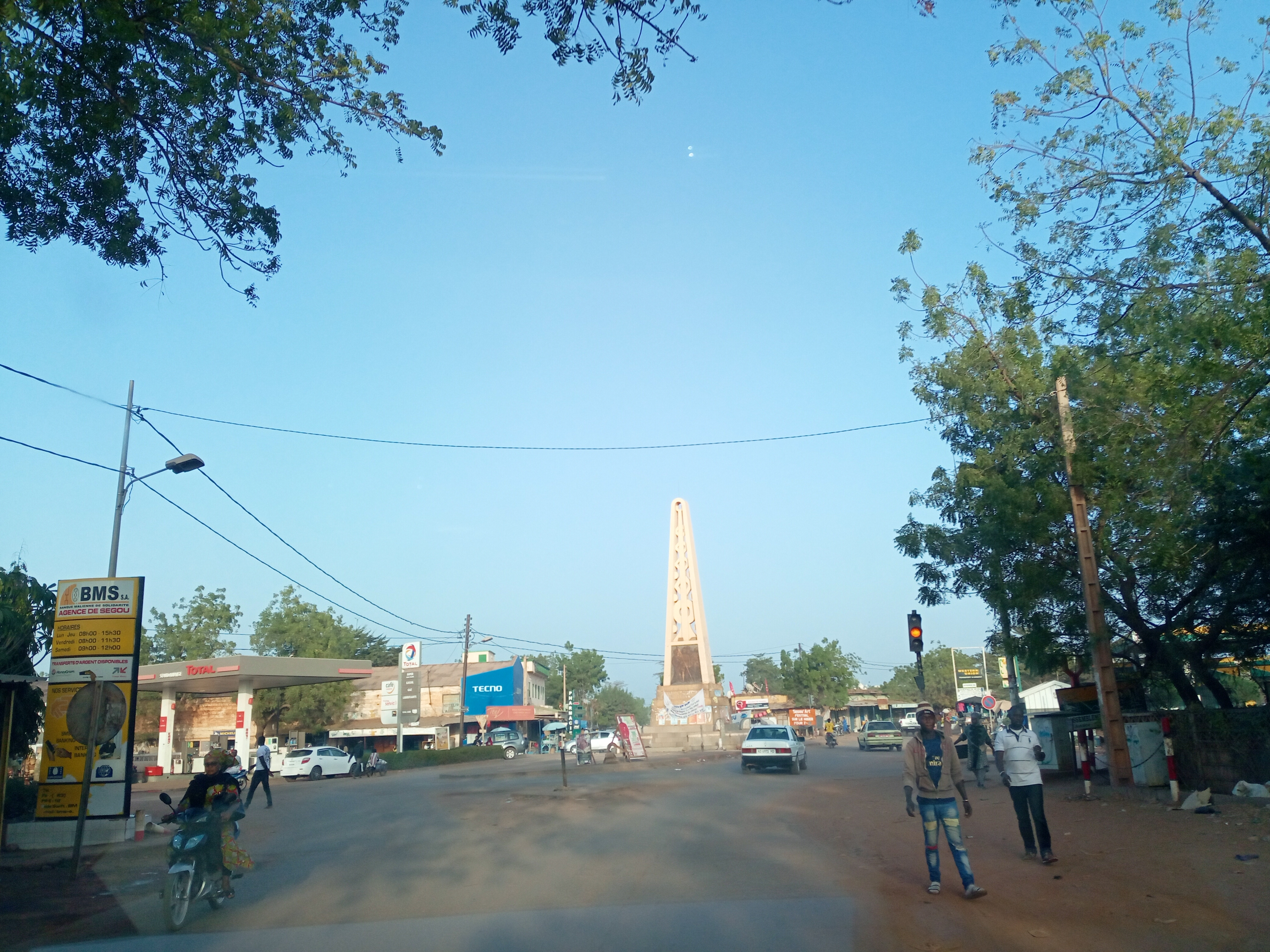
- View of Ségou

- Location within Mali
- Coordinates: 13°27′N 6°16′W
- Country: Mali
- Region: Ségou
- Cercle: Ségou Cercle
- Established: 1620

Area
  - Total: 37 km^{2} (14 sq mi)
- Elevation: 294 m (965 ft)

Population (2009 census)
  - Total: 130,690
  - Density: 3,500/km^{2} (9,100/sq mi)
- Time zone: UTC+0 (GMT)

Ségou (French pronunciation: [seɡu]; Bambara: ߛߋߜ߭ߎ߫, Segu) is a town and an urban commune in south-central Mali that lies 235 kilometres (146 mi) northeast of Bamako on the right bank of the River Niger. The town is the capital of the Ségou Cercle and the Ségou Region. With 130,690 inhabitants in 2009, it is the fifth-largest town in Mali.

In the middle of the 19th century there were four villages with the name of Ségou spread out over a distance of around 12 km (7.5 mi) along the right bank of the river. They were, starting from the most upstream, Ségou-Koro (Old Ségou), Ségou-Bougou, Ségou-Koura (New Ségou) and Ségou-Sikoro. The present town is on the site of Ségou-Sikoro.

== History ==
=== Origin ===
Ségou has contested origins. Some claim that the word Ségou come from "Sikoro", meaning to the foot of a shea butter tree. Others argue that it was named after Cheikou, a marabout who founded the city, while still other theories support the claim that Ségou was founded by the Bozo fishermen coming from the north in the 4th century, who established their villages along the Niger River. The 11th century CE saw an influx of the Soninke people, who were trying to escape from the collapse of the Ghana Empire, with Mandinka populations following.

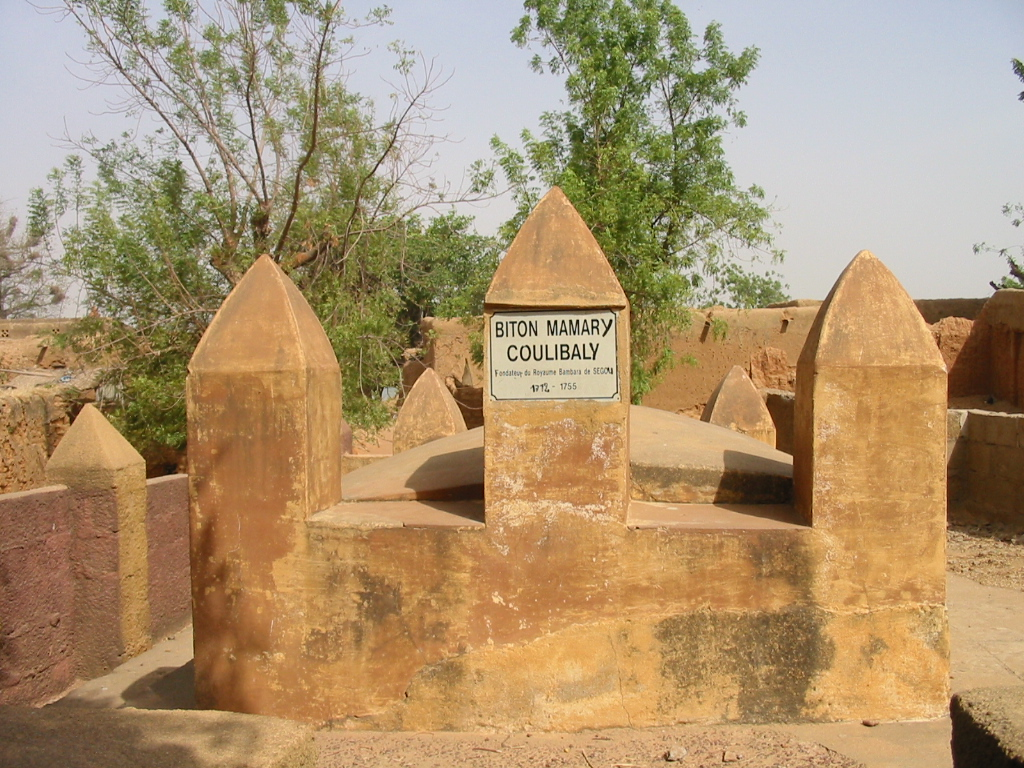
Tomb of Biton Mamary Coulibaly at Ségou-Koro

=== Bambara Empire ===
Around 1650 Kaladian Coulibaly overthrew the ruling Koita dynasty and established a powerful if short-lived kingdom with Ségou-Koro as capital.

One of Koulibaly's great-grandsons, Mamary Coulibaly, also known as Bitòn, became the chief of his tòn, an association of men, sometime after 1700. By 1712, Bitòn had used his military strength to displace local elders and expand the Bambara Empire. In the subsequent decades, he expanded its territory to encompass regional commerce centers such as Macina and Djenné. The city of Timbuktu would become a tributary state to Bitòn's Bambara Empire. At this time Segou was capital of the Bambara Empire, and a distinct urban architecture began to emerge at Ségou Koro, including mosques.

After Bitòn's death in 1755 a period of instability followed, during which the capital of the Empire moved repeatedly. In 1766 Ngolo Diarra, a former slave and warrior, took control the Bambara Empire and inaugurated a period of prosperity. The Diarra dynasty ruled Ségou until the mid-19th century. He moved the kingdom's capital from Segou-Koro to Ségou-Sikoro, close to the site of the current city.

Mungo Park, passing through Segou in 1797 recorded a testament to the Empire's prosperity:

The view of this extensive city, the numerous canoes on the river, the crowded population, and the cultivated state of the surrounding countryside, formed altogether a prospect of civilization and magnificence that I little expected to find in the bosom of Africa.

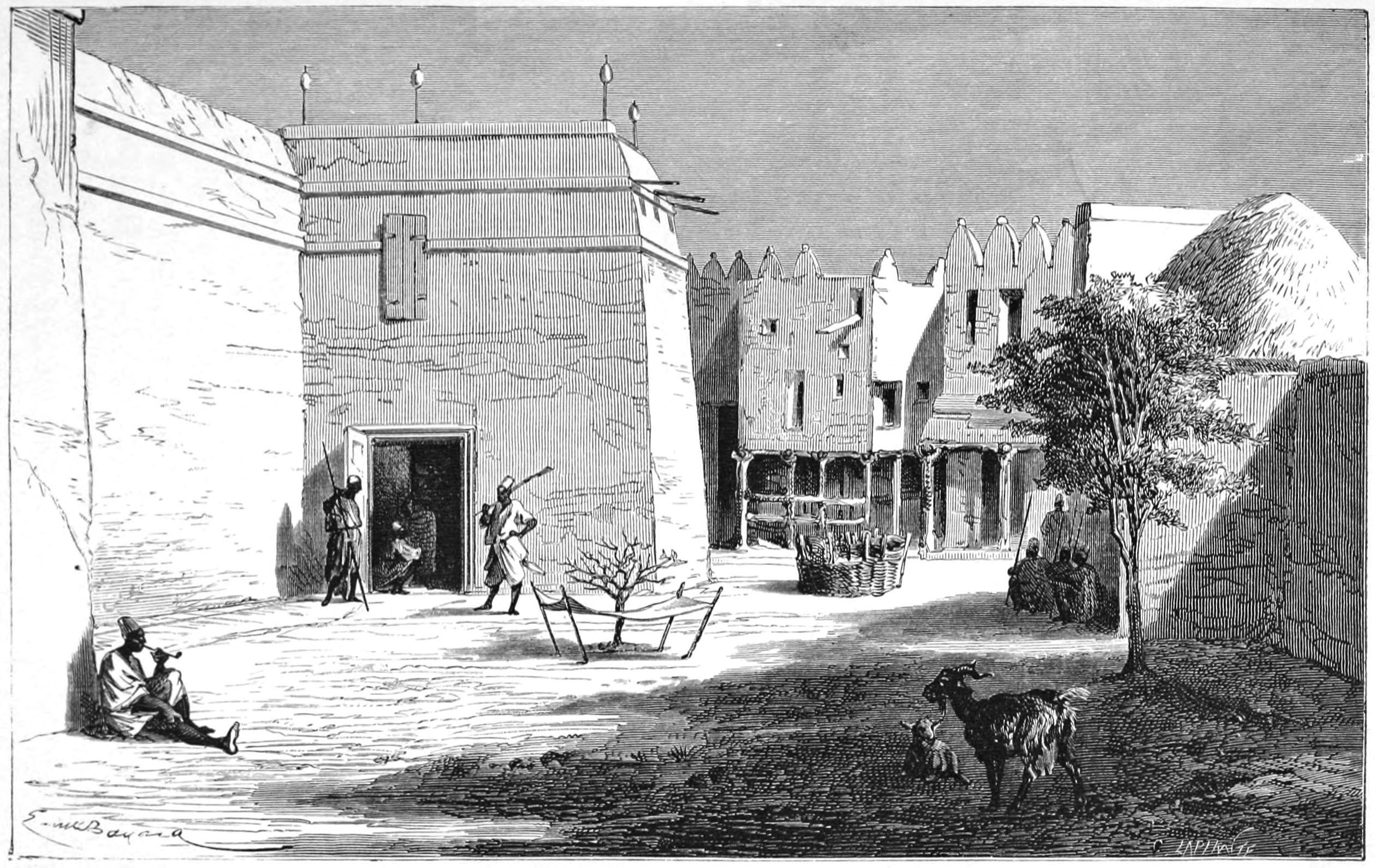
Entrance to the palace of Ahmadu Tall at Ségou-Sikoro in around 1866

=== Toucouleur Empire ===
On March 10, 1861, the Muslim Toucouleur leader, El Hadj Oumar Tall, conquered the town. Under his rule, the prominent military architect Samba Ndiaye rebuilt some of the town's defenses. On his death in 1864, he was succeeded by his son Ahmadu Tall, who dealt repeatedly with rebellions and challenges from his brothers. After years of tensions and conflict, Segou was conquered by the French when forces led by Colonel Louis Archinard entered the town on April 6, 1890.

=== French colonial rule ===
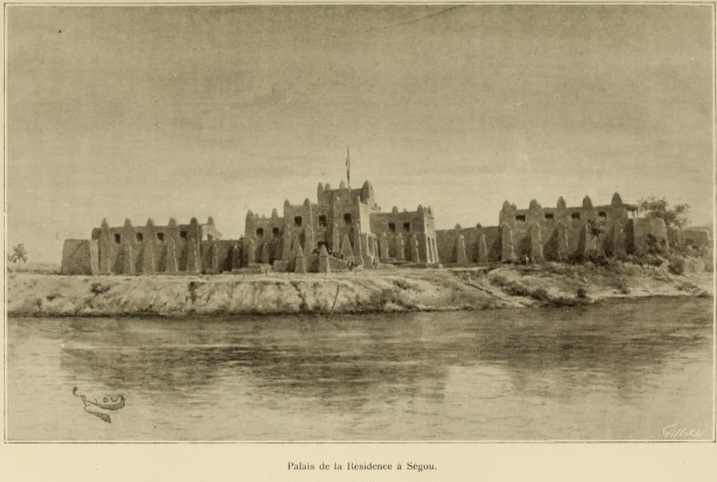
The reconstructed residence palace of Ségou, built by the French colonial government in 1893 on the ruins of Ahmadu Tall's palace.

France attempted indirectly ruling Ségou until March 13, 1893, when they incorporated the town as the capital of a local cercle. Ségou continued to serve as a regional commercial center throughout French rule.

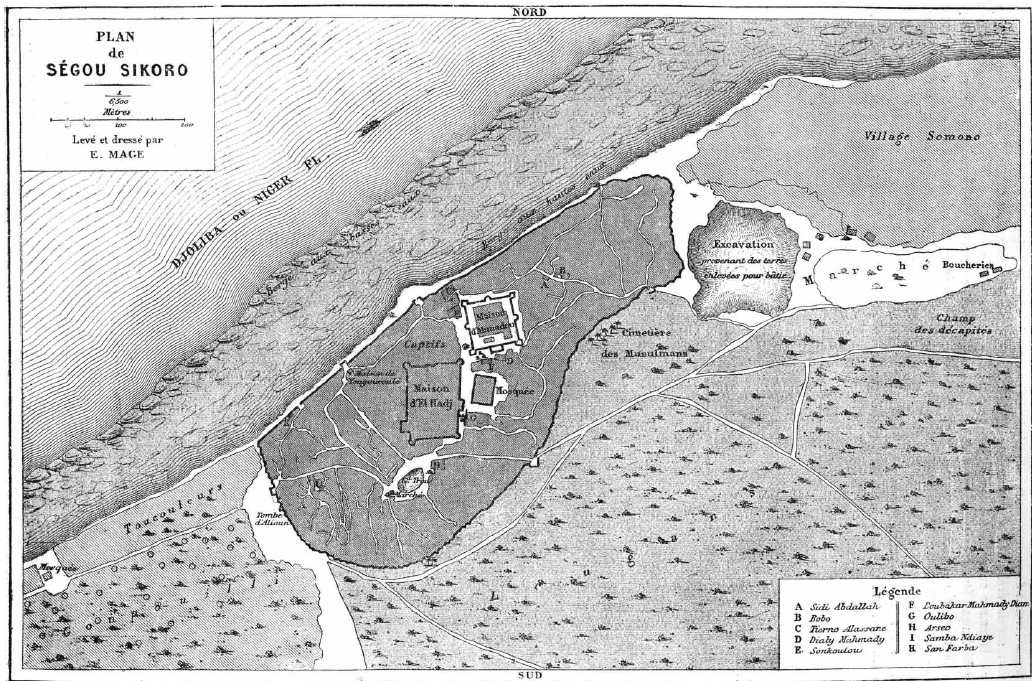
A map of Segou Sikoro in 1860s

== Geography ==
=== Location ===
Ségou is situated 235 kilometres (146 mi) from Bamako, on the right bank of the Niger River. The urban commune is bordered to the east by the commune of Pelengana, to the west by the commune of Sébougou and to the south by the commune of Sakoïba.

The commune is subdivided into 15 quartiers: Alamissani, Angoulême, Bagadadji, Bougoufié, Comatex, Dar Salam, Hamdallaye, Médine, Mission Catholique, Missira, Ségou Coura, Sido Soninkoura, Somono, Sokalakono, Bananissabakoro.

=== Climate ===
Ségou has a hot semi-arid climate (Köppen BSh). The city is irrigated by two important waterways: the Niger and the Bani River. Ségou has two seasons: a rainy season and a dry season. The rainy season starts in June and lasts about four months until September. Ségou's dry season includes a relatively mild period followed by a period of sweltering heat. The average yearly rainfall is about 640 millimetres or 25 inches. The harmattan is the dominant wind in the dry season and it blows from north to south. The monsoon blowing from south to north-west is frequent during rainy season (hivernage).

Climate data for Segou (1991–2020)
Month	Jan	Feb	Mar	Apr	May	Jun	Jul	Aug	Sep	Oct	Nov	Dec	Year
Mean daily maximum °C (°F)	33.3 (91.9)	36.5 (97.7)	39.6 (103.3)	41.4 (106.5)	40.8 (105.4)	37.8 (100.0)	33.9 (93.0)	32.1 (89.8)	33.4 (92.1)	36.5 (97.7)	37.3 (99.1)	34.6 (94.3)	36.4 (97.5)
Daily mean °C (°F)	25.3 (77.5)	28.2 (82.8)	31.5 (88.7)	34.0 (93.2)	34.1 (93.4)	31.9 (89.4)	28.9 (84.0)	27.6 (81.7)	28.4 (83.1)	30.1 (86.2)	29.0 (84.2)	26.2 (79.2)	29.6 (85.3)
Mean daily minimum °C (°F)	17.2 (63.0)	19.8 (67.6)	23.4 (74.1)	26.6 (79.9)	27.5 (81.5)	26.0 (78.8)	24.0 (75.2)	23.2 (73.8)	23.4 (74.1)	23.5 (74.3)	20.6 (69.1)	17.8 (64.0)	22.8 (73.0)
Average precipitation mm (inches)	2.2 (0.09)	0.2 (0.01)	1.5 (0.06)	4.9 (0.19)	31.5 (1.24)	89.4 (3.52)	175.7 (6.92)	220.7 (8.69)	110.4 (4.35)	20.9 (0.82)	0.8 (0.03)	0.0 (0.0)	658.2 (25.92)
Average precipitation days (≥ 1.0 mm)	0.3	0.2	0.4	1.2	4.2	8.3	12.7	16.1	10.7	2.7	0.2	0.0	57
Mean monthly sunshine hours	281.2	256.1	275.1	253.1	264.4	253.9	248.7	231.0	241.5	272.4	264.8	271.7	3,113.9
Source: NOAA (sun, 1961-1990)

== Demography ==
As of the 2009 Mali Census, Ségou has a population of 130,690, up from 105,305 in 1998. A 2007 estimate put the city's population at 118,814.

The population of the Ségou Region is largely rural, and nomadic semi-sedentary or sedentary. The population consists of many ethnic groups, such as Bambara, Bozo, Fulani, Soninke, Malinke and Toucouleur.

The town of Ségou itself is home to a variety of ethnic groups, including the Malinke, the Soninke, the Fulani, and the Toucouleur, due to its complex history and status as a regional commercial center.

Bambaras are mostly farmers and are the most numerous ethnic group. Their language is Bambara or Djoula. The Bozos are the second most populous ethnic group. They typically live near the shore of the Niger river, in small towns of small houses. The Bozo economy is based on fishing. Bozo people have a monopoly on the transport system because of their knowledge of the Niger, its shallows and seasonal lakes, and are regarded as the masters of water. The Somono, a group known to specialize in fishing and boating, are largely concentrated in Ségou and its surroundings. The Malinké/Mandinka/Maninka are closely related to Bambaras: They share costumes, religious beliefs, and practices with the Bambaras. The Marka, Saracollé or Soninke are merchants and warriors. The Soninke people are great travelers and Muslims, and have largely conserved their traditions.

Women with food for sale in dishes on their heads, Niger River bank, Segou 1972

Four men wash clothes in the Niger River, Segou 1972.

An alley in between mud houses, Segou 1972.

Weavers at work, Segou 1972

A market on the bank of the Niger River, 1993

The Bamanan Bar Restaurant Dancing Ségou, 1993

A girl on a street near a mosque, Segou 1993

Market of cooking pans on the Niger River bank, Segou 1993

== Art and culture ==
The Bambaras used to transmit their knowledge by oral tradition, hence much of their art and culture is unknown. Ségou's cultural heritage includes traditional musical instruments, wonderful griots, folkloric groups and the traditional masks and marionettes. The history of the Bambara state's traditional religious practices are ambiguous. They practice animism and fetishism as cultural practices, and also totemic and monism (cult of ancestors). The most famous Ségou handcrafts are based on pottery, weaving (blankets, wrappers and carpets), manufacturing of Bogolan (a distinctive variation of Mud cloth), painting and sculpture. Ségou is also regarded as the capital of Malian pottery with a large pottery district in Kalabougou situated on the left bank. Women make the pottery by hand with the clay coming from the Niger River and bring the finished works to the local Monday market.

=== Festivals ===
The most well-known festival in Ségou is the annual Festival sur le Niger (Festival on the Niger). This festival celebrates music and the arts and culture of the Bambara people, and includes the Caravane culturelle de la paix since 2013. The 16th edition of the festival took place in 2019, when for the first time it combined with Ségou' Art, a contemporary art fair. The two festivals continue to be combined for the 2023 event, which takes place over six days in early February.

== Education ==
The University of Ségou was founded in 2009. As of 2008, Ségou has 13 kindergartens, 33 primary schools, 17 secondary schools, and 40 madrasas.

== Places of worship ==
Among the places of worship, they are predominantly Muslim mosques. There are also Christian churches and temples : Roman Catholic Diocese of Ségou (Catholic Church), Église Chrétienne Évangélique du Mali (Alliance World Fellowship), Assemblies of God.

== Architecture ==
Ségou has two architectural styles: French Colonial and traditional Sudanese and neo-Sudanese. The Sudanese style influenced public building and important residences. Monuments and great mosques are also built according to this style. Many of Sudano-Sahelian's kings built imposing palaces in the cities over which they ruled and most of these buildings are in red clay. The materials used for building are generally quite poor and many of the buildings need to be restored to maintain their state.

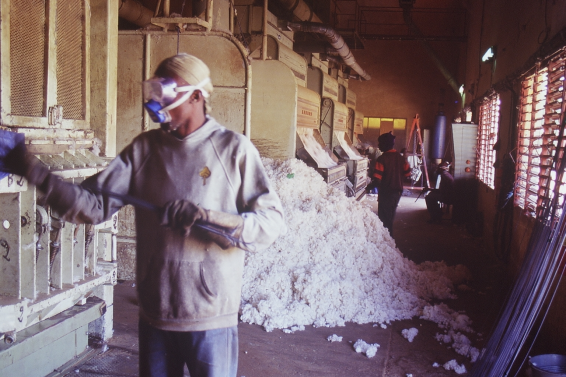
The CMDT cotton processing plant near Ségou.

== Economy ==
Today, Ségou is known for its pottery, its market and its fishing industry. Attractions in the old town of Ségou-Koro included a mosque, Coulibaly's tomb and an ancient tree. In the city center, the main landmark is the water tower.

The most important economic activities are fishing, cattle herding and small scale farming. Millet is the main crop in Ségou, with other major cereals including sorghum, and cowpea. The main type of millet crop is rice pearl millet. Black-eyed peas are also grown. Crop yields in Ségou are generally low. Common types of livestock in Ségou includes sheep, poultry, cattle, goats, and donkeys. Both artisanal and commercial fishing are practiced in Ségou. Men often do the fishing, while women usually market the fish.

While most consumer goods are imported into Ségou, the city produces, and exports, handicraft and agricultural products.

As of 2008, the town is served by two telecom operators: Ikatel and Sotelma.

There are two factories processing cotton: Compagnie Malienne des Textiles (COMATEX) and Compagnie malienne pour le développement du textile (CMDT). Commerce consists mostly of the small scale exchange and sale of products from the primary sector, sold weekly at the large Sudano-Sahelian market, drawing customers from far outside of the city. The main products sold are vegetables, pottery, cotton, leather, fruit, ovens, cattle and cereals.

The headquarters of the Office du Niger is based in the town. The Office du Niger is a semi-autonomous government agency that administers a large irrigation scheme in the Ségou Region to the north of the Niger River.

Ségou used to be served by Ségou Airport (IATA: SZU, ICAO: GASG). The airport lay south-west of the city center and is visible on old maps as well as satellite imagery.

== Notable residents ==
Notable people from Ségou include Adame Ba Konare, Fanta Damba, Garan Fabou Kouyate, Mountaga Tall, and Bassekou Kouyate.

Maryse Condé's historical novel Segu tells the city's history from 1797 to its 1860 defeat by El Hajj Oumar Tall's army.

== International relations ==
=== Twin towns – sister cities ===
Ségou is twinned with:

- Angoulême, France, since 1984.
- Richmond, Virginia, United States.

== See also ==
- Bamana Empire: for the Ségou Empire
- List of cities in Mali

== Sources ==
- Kanya-Forstner, A.S. (2009) [1969], The Conquest of the Western Sudan: A Study in French Military Imperialism, Cambridge: Cambridge University Press, ISBN 978-0-521-10372-5.
- Mage, Eugène (1868), Voyage dans le Soudan occidental (Senegambie-Niger) (in French), Paris: Hachette.
- MacDonald, Kevin (2012). ""The least of their inhabited villages are fortified": the walled settlements of Segou". Azania: Archaeological Research in Africa. 47 (3): 343–364. doi:10.1080/0067270X.2012.707478.
- Park, Mungo (1799), Travels in the Interior Districts of Africa: Performed Under the Direction and Patronage of the African Association, in the Years 1795, 1796, and 1797, London: W. Bulmer and Company.
- Schreyger, Emil (2002), "De la 'mission Bélime' à l'Office du Niger", in Bonneval, P.; Kuper, M.; Tonneau, J-P. (eds.), L'Office du Niger, grenier à riz du Mali: Succès économiques, transitions culturelles et politiques de développement (in French), Paris: Karthala, ISBN 978-2-84586-255-5.
- Tamari, Tal (1991), "The Development of Caste Systems in West Africa", The Journal of African History, 32 (2): 221–250, doi:10.1017/S0021853700025718, ISSN 0021-8537, JSTOR 182616
- Triaud, Jean-Louis (1997), "Segu", Encyclopaedia of Islam. Volume IX San-Sze (2nd ed.), Leiden: Brill, pp. 121–122, ISBN 978-90-04-10422-8.
- Plan de Sécurité Alimentaire Commune Urbaine de Ségou 2008-2012 (PDF) (in French), Commissariat à la Sécurité Alimentaire, République du Mali, USAID-Mali, 2008, archived from the original (PDF) on 2012-08-30.
