= Ségou Region =

Region of Mali

- Region
- Location within Mali
- Coordinates: 13°22′5″N 5°16′24″W
- Country: Mali
- Capital: Ségou

Government
  - Governor: Soulaïmane Traoré

Area
  - Total: 52,100 km^{2} (20,100 sq mi)

Population (2023)
  - Total: 2,421,811
  - Density: 46.5/km^{2} (120/sq mi)
- Time zone: UTC±0 (UTC)
- HDI (2019): 0.386 low · 6th

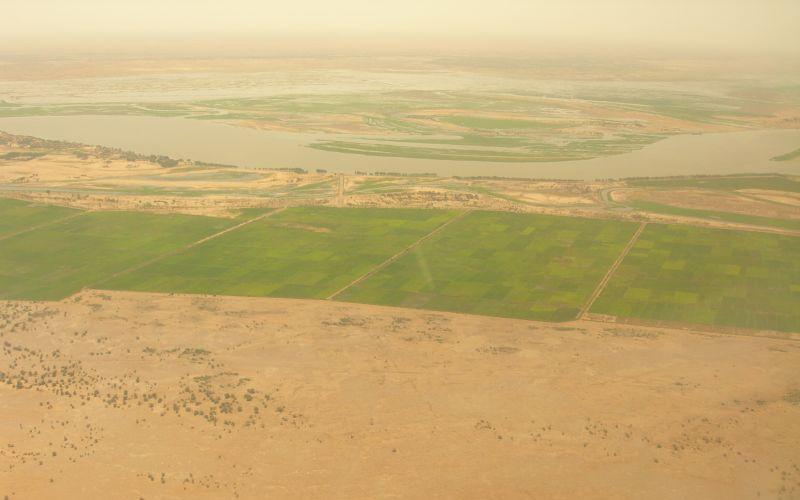
Farms, sahel, and riverine marsh near Macina, Ségou Region

Ségou Region (Bambara: ߛߋߓߎ ߘߌߣߋߖߊ tr. Segu Dineja) is an administrative region in Mali, situated in the centre of the country with an area of 52,100 km^{2} (20,100 sq mi), around 4% of Mali. The region is bordered by Sikasso Region on the south, Tombouctou and Mopti on the east, Burkina Faso to the southeast, the Koulikoro Region to the west, and Mauritania's Hodh Ech Chargui region to the north. In 2023 it had 2,421,811 inhabitants, making it the second most populous region of Mali. Its administrative capital is the town of Ségou.

== Climate ==
The Ségou Region is characterized by a semi-arid climate and irrigated by two important waterways: the Niger and the Bani River, allowing irrigation for agriculture. Ségou has two seasons: a rainy season and a dry season. The rainy season starts in June and lasts about four months until September. On the other hand, the dry season includes a cold period and a period of heat. The average yearly rainfall is about 513 mm (20 in). The harmattan is the dominant wind in the dry season and it blows from north to south. The monsoon blowing from south to north-west is more frequent during the rainy season (hivernage).

== Demography ==
With a rural population that is largely nomadic semi-sedentary or sedentary, the population consists of many ethnic groups such as the Bambara, Bozo, Soninke, Malinké and Toucouleur. Bambaras are mostly farmers and are the most numerous ethnic group. Their language is Bambara or Djoula. The Bozos are the second most populous ethnic group. They live in the borders of Niger, in small towns constituted of small houses. The Bozos economy is based on fishing. Bozo people have a monopoly on the transport system because of their knowledge in the river by Niger, and are regarded as the masters of water. The Somono, also fishermen, are not a distinct ethnic group but a mixture of the Bambara, Bozo and Soninke. The Malinké, Maninka, and Mandinka are closely related to Bambaras. They have the same costumes, beliefs and religious practices as the Bambaras. The Marka, Saracollé and Soninke are merchants and warriors. Islam is the largest religion, making up 98.52% of the population, with 1.29% being Christian.

Ethnicity in Segou region (2022)
1. Bambara (55.7%)
2. Fula (12.7%)
3. Senufo (5.77%)
4. Soninke (5.64%)
5. Bozo (4.88%)
6. Dogon (2.75%)
7. Malinké (2.45%)
8. Songhai (1.73%)
9. Mossi (1.26%)
10. Somono (1.10%)
11. Bobo / Bwa (1.08%)
12. Tuareg (1.01%)
13. Other (3.94%)
Mother tongues in Segou region (2022 census)
1. Bambara (79.75%)
2. Fula (6.61%)
3. Bozo (2.47%)
4. Maraka / Soninké (1.87%)
5. Minianka (1.85%)
6. Dogon (1.70%)
7. Songhai (1.16%)
8. Mossi (1.09%)
9. Malinke (0.95%)
10. Other Malian (2.40%)
11. Other African (0.05%)
12. Other foreign (0.10%)

== Economy ==
Today, Ségou is known for its pottery, market and fishing industry. Attractions in the old town of Ségou-Koro included a mosque, Coulibaly's tomb and an ancient tree. In the city center, the main landmark is the water tower.

The main economic activities of the Ségou region are agri-business, cattle farming and fishing. The Ségou people apply essential traditional farming methods. Ségou produces the major part of Mali's national food, including sedentary cattle farming. The economy is essentially informal as it is oriented towards the population's primary needs, while industrial production is weak and based in the food industry. Large scale agribusiness consists of three factories, COMATEX, CMDT and SUKALA. Commerce consists mostly of the small scale exchange and sale by of products from the primary sector, sold weekly at the large Ségou market, drawing customers from far outside of the city. The main products sold are vegetables, pottery, cotton, gold, leather, fruits, ovens, cattle and cereals.

== Administrative subdivisions ==
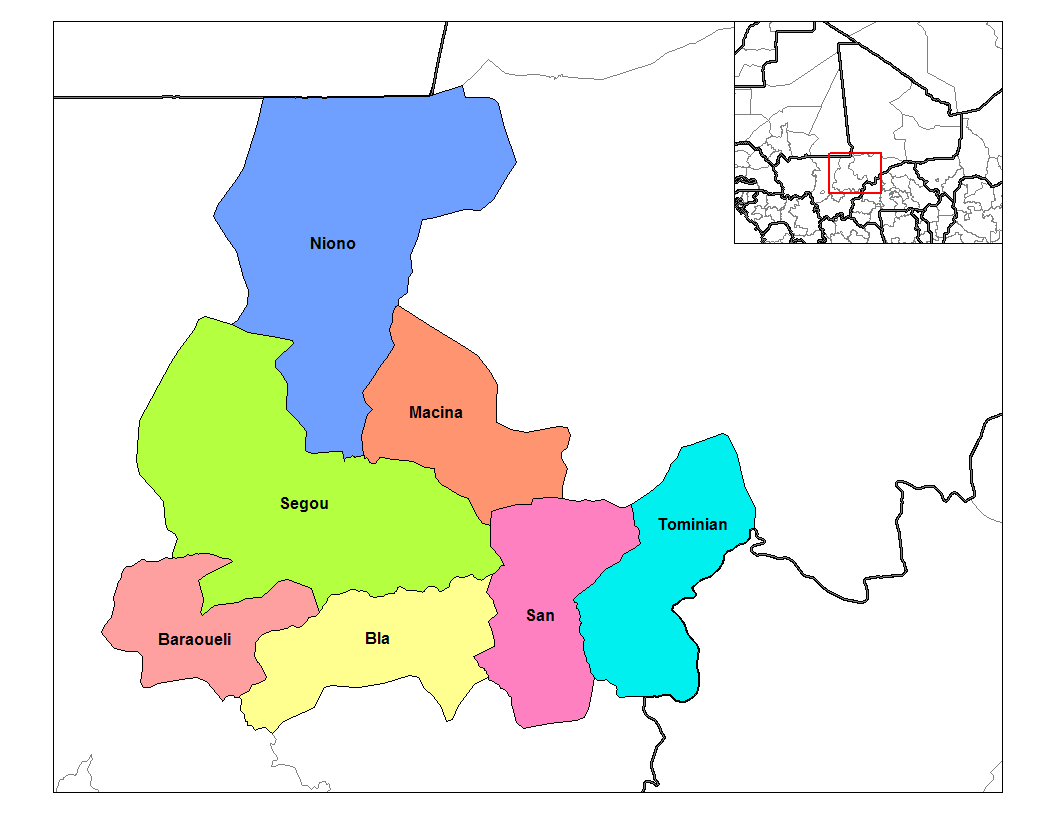
Cercles of the Ségou Region

Ségou Region is divided into 7 cercles encompassing 118 communes and 2,166 villages:

Cercle name	Area (km^{2})	Population Census 1998	Population Census 2009
Bla	6,200	202,295	283,663
Barouéli	4,170	157,145	203,550
Macina	11,750	168,853	237,477
Niono	23,063	228,264	365,443
San	7,262	250,597	334,911
Ségou	10,844	501,447	691,358
Tominian	6,573	166,756	219,853

== Towns ==
The major towns are Ségou, San, Niono, Dioro, and Markala, the latter of which has Mali's principal hydroelectric dam.

== History ==
The region was the home of the Bambara Empire in the early 18th century. It was conquered by the Toucouleur Empire in the 1860s and by France in the 1890s.

== See also ==
- Regions of Mali
- Cercles of Mali
