= San Dieguito River =

Coordinates: 32°58′23.01″N 117°14′57.57″W

San Dieguito River Rio San Bernardo
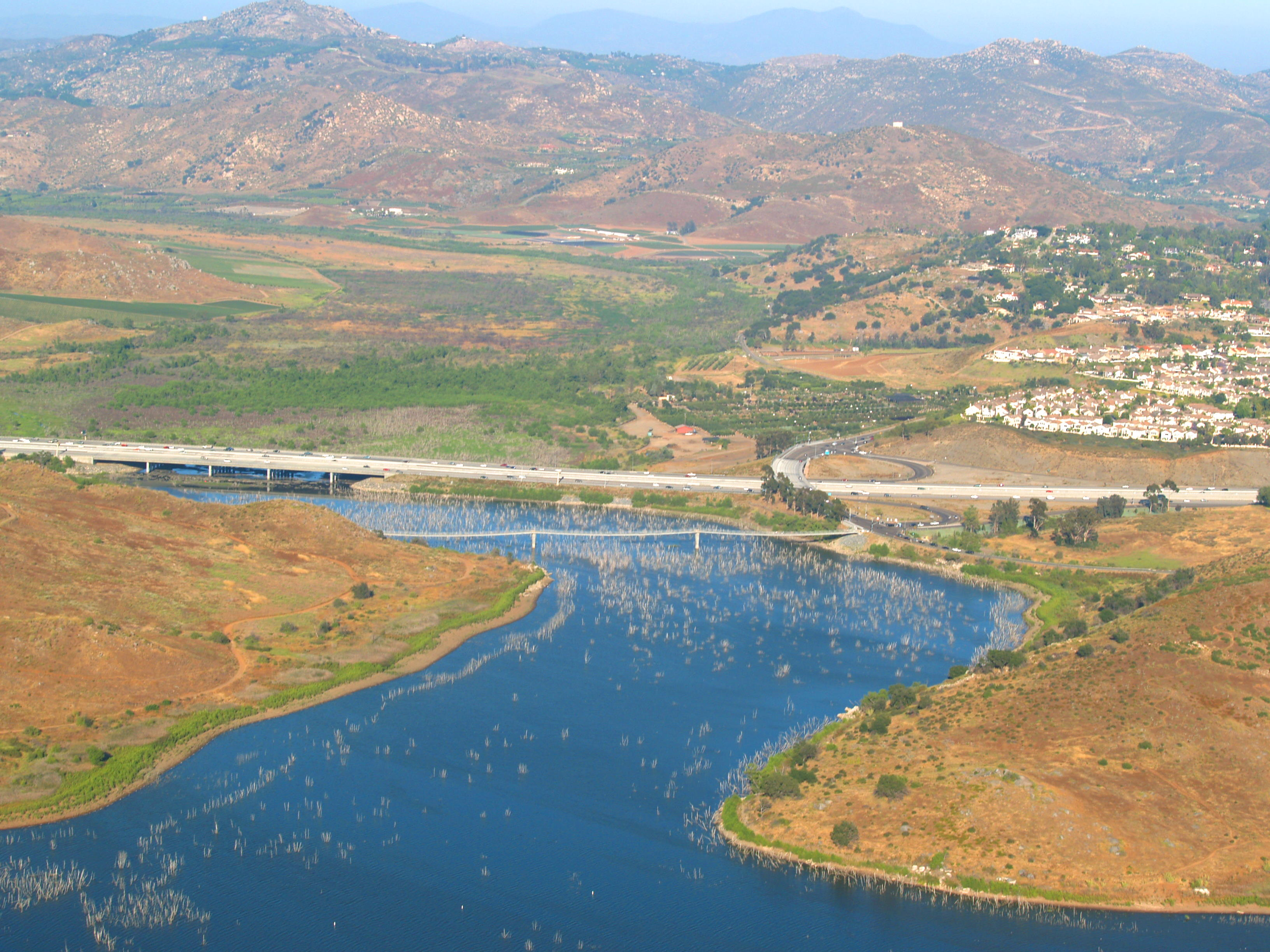
- The San Dieguito River entering Lake Hodges
- Etymology: Likely based on the name of San Diego River "ito" is the Spanish diminutive suffix for "little". Thus, Little San Diego River.

Location
- Country: United States
- State: California
- Region: Southern California
- District: San Diego County
- Municipality: Del Mar

Physical characteristics
- Source: Santa Ysabel Creek
- 2nd source: Santa Maria Creek
- Mouth: Pacific Ocean
  - location: Del Mar
  - elevation: 0 ft (0 m)
- Length: 24 mi (39 km), northeast-southwest
- Basin size: 346 mi^{2} (900 km^{2})
- Discharge
  - average: 50 cu ft/s (1.4 m^{3}/s)
  - minimum: 0 cu ft/s (0 m^{3}/s)
  - maximum: 72,100 cu ft/s (2,040 m^{3}/s)

Basin features
- Tributaries
  - left: Santa Maria Creek
  - right: Temescal Creek, San Diego County|Temescal Creek

The San Dieguito River is a major river in Southern California, United States. Its headwaters rise on the southern slope of the Volcan Mountains in San Diego County, and the river flows generally southwest for 23.8 miles (38.3 km), draining 346 square miles (900 km^{2}) before emptying into the Pacific Ocean 20 miles (32 km) north of San Diego.

== Course ==
The river officially begins at the confluence of two streams, Santa Ysabel Creek and Santa Maria Creek, near the town of San Pasqual. Santa Ysabel Creek rises in the northeastern corner of the San Dieguito River watershed and flows west, creating Lake Sutherland. It then flows out of the lake's dam and westwards for the rest of its course. Its total length is about 11 miles (18 km). Santa Maria Creek, the smaller of the two streams, begins near the city of Ramona and flows northwards about 7 miles (11 km) through the Ramona Grasslands and Bandy Canyon. A third fork, Temescal Creek, rises in the Cleveland National Forest near Lake Henshaw and flows south about 9 miles (14 km) into Santa Ysabel Creek.

From there the river flows west past the city of Escondido, and under Interstate 15 before being impounded by Lake Hodges Dam to form Lake Hodges. From the dam to its mouth, the river flows through the long and narrow San Dieguito River Park past Del Mar, and broadens into a tidal waterway and a 150-acre (0.61 km^{2}) lagoon as it crosses under Interstate 5 and past the Del Mar Fairgrounds to empty into the Pacific Ocean at Del Mar, California.

== Watershed ==
The San Dieguito River watershed has vast areas, over 83%, of open space. As a result, it provides habitat for hundreds of plant and animal species. Vegetation cover ranges from pine forest on the slopes of the headwater mountains to arid grassland on the plateaus and plains further downstream. However, 18% of the basin, mostly along the shoreline, is devoted to urban areas. About 150,000 people live in the San Dieguito River watershed, but could expand to 210,000 by 2015. The lower river suffers from pollutants that affect rivers all over Southern California, mainly from E. coli bacteria from urban runoff.

== History ==
Prehistorically, the San Dieguito tribe inhabited much of San Diego County, with their main villages on the San Dieguito River. Remains of this culture are identified as the "San Dieguito River Complex". By the 16th century, most of the basin formed the southern part of the Luiseño tribal territory.

The Portola expedition of 1769 camped at the river, not far from the coast. On the De Anza Expedition's way back to Mexico from San Francisco Bay, Father Pedro Font mentions "San Dieguillo" in his diary on January 10, 1776. An Indian rancheria, San Dieguito, is mentioned under the jurisdiction of the San Diego Mission in 1778.

In 1840 or 1841, after the Mission Period, the name was applied to the Rancho San Dieguito, which was granted in 1845. The rancho name was later changed to Rancho Santa Fe.

== Crossings ==
From mouth to source, the river crosses under:

- CR S21 - Camino Del Mar (Historic U.S. Route 101 in Del Mar)
- San Diego Northern Railway Corporation's (SDNR) Surf Line (Del Mar)
  - NCTD's Coaster
  - Amtrak Pacific Surfliner
- Jimmy Durante Boulevard (Del Mar)
- I-5 - San Diego Freeway (San Diego)
- El Camino Real (San Diego)
- Via de Santa Fe (Rancho Santa Fe/Fairbanks Ranch)
- Second San Diego Aqueduct (Rancho Santa Fe)
- Bing Crosby Boulevard (Rancho Santa Fe)
- San Dieguito River Park Coast to Crest Trail (Rancho Santa Fe)
- Lake Hodges Dam (San Diego)
- David Kreitzer Lake Hodges Bicycle Pedestrian Bridge (San Diego)
- I-15 - Escondido Freeway (via Lake Hodges Bridge in San Diego)

== See also ==
- San Diego River
- Santa Margarita River
- Otay River
- San Dieguito River Park
