= Terwillegar Park Footbridge =

Pedestrian bridge in Edmonton, Canada

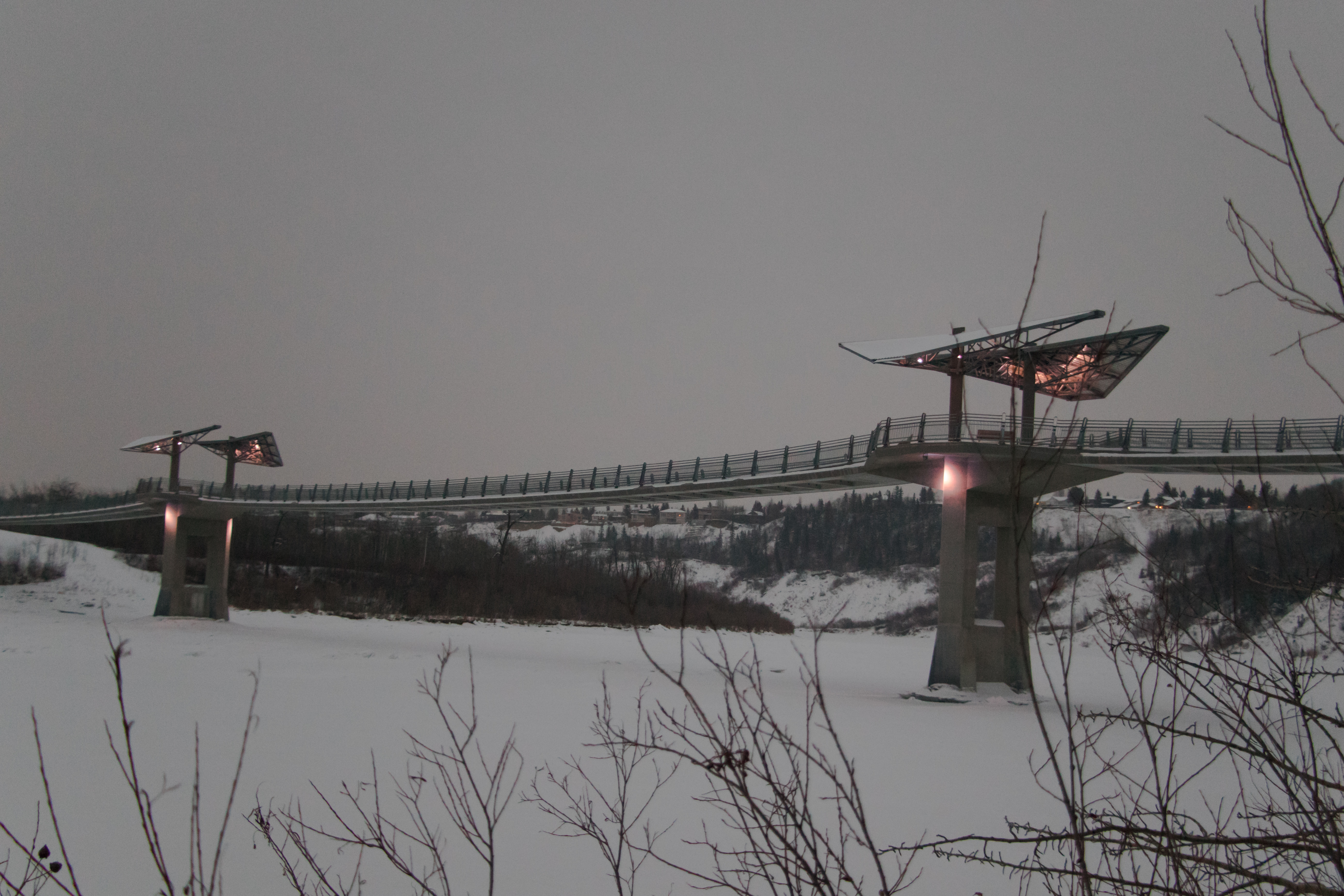
- Coordinates: 53°28′52″N 113°35′53″W
- Carries: Pedestrians and bicycles
- Crosses: North Saskatchewan River
- Locale: Edmonton, Alberta, Canada
- Official name: Terwillegar Park Footbridge
- Maintained by: City of Edmonton

Characteristics
- Design: Stressed ribbon bridge
- Material: Concrete
- Total length: 262 m (860 ft)
- No. of spans: 3
- Piers in water: 2

History
- Designer: Stantec
- Construction start: August 2014
- Opened: October 21, 2016

Location
- Interactive map of Terwillegar Park Footbridge

The Terwillegar Park Footbridge is a pedestrian bridge that crosses the North Saskatchewan River in Edmonton, Alberta, Canada. At 262 metres (860 feet) in length, it is the longest stressed ribbon bridge in Canada and second longest in the world after the David Kreitzer Lake Hodges Bicycle Pedestrian Bridge in Escondido, California, United States. The bridge is a first for the city and was built to connect Terwillegar Park in the southern side with Oleskiw River Valley Park on the north side of the river. It opened to the public on October 21, 2016.

== Design ==
The surface of the bridge consists of 86 precast deck panels, each being approximately 2.64 metres long and 5.3 metres wide. The panels are held by 162 individual steel cables that are anchored on each side of the bridge. The bridge cost $24.5 million CAD.

== See also ==
- List of crossings of the North Saskatchewan River

Preceded by Anthony Henday Drive Highway Bridge	Bridge across the North Saskatchewan River	Succeeded by Fort Edmonton Footbridge
