= Lake Hodges =

Reservoir in San Diego, California

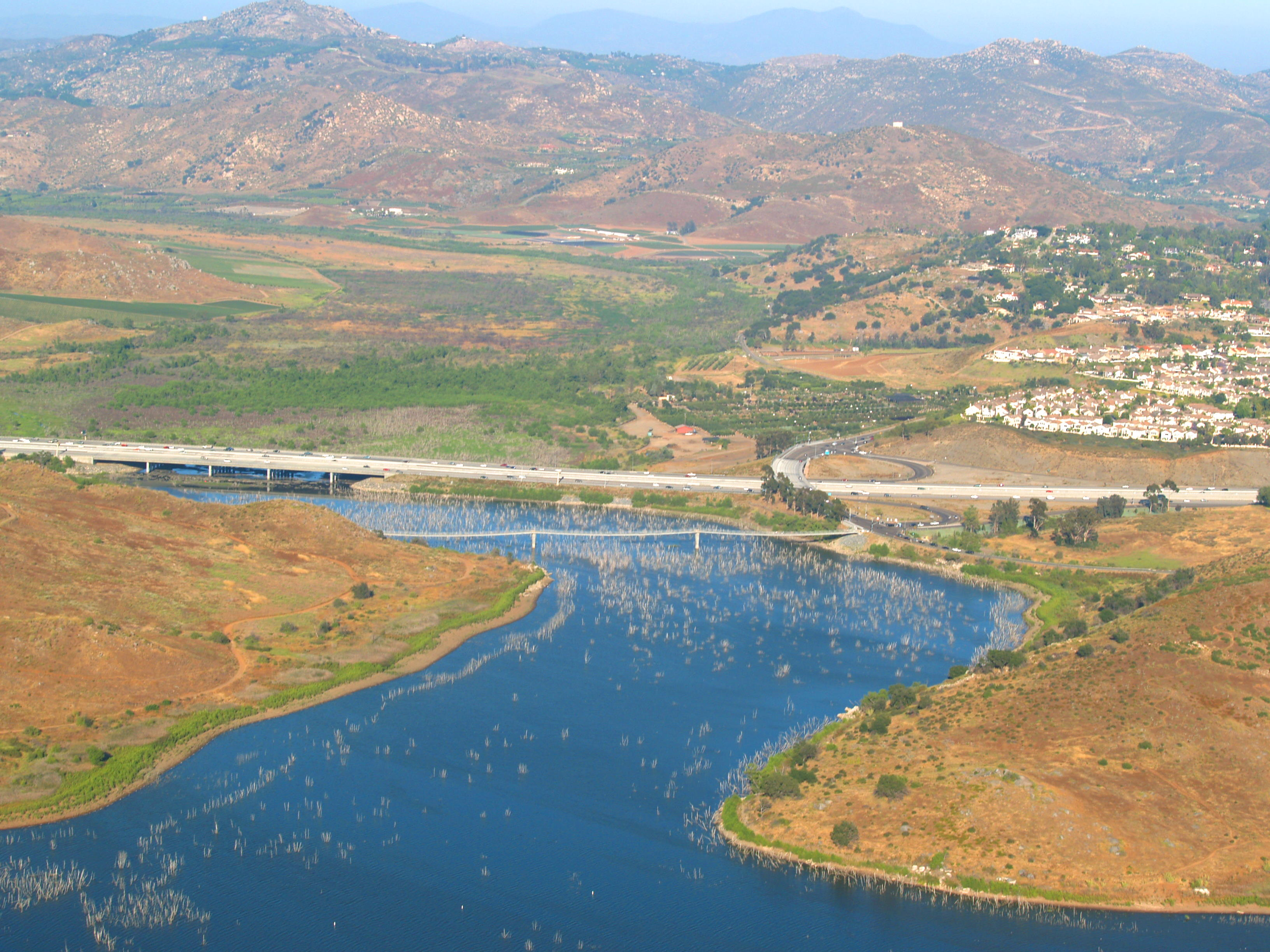
- Lake Hodges looking east with views of the 2009 pedestrian bridge, Interstate 15's Lake Hodges Bridge, and the San Pasqual Valley in the distance

- Location within California Location within the United States
- Location: San Diego, California
- Coordinates: 33°02′42″N 117°07′43″W
- Type: reservoir
- Primary inflows: San Dieguito River
- Primary outflows: San Dieguito River
- Basin countries: United States
- Managing agency: City of San Diego
- Surface elevation: 220 ft (67 m)
- Dam: Lake Hodges Dam
- Website: www.sandiego.gov/reservoirs-lakes/hodges-reservoir

Lake Hodges is a reservoir in San Diego, California. It is about 31 miles (50 km) north of downtown San Diego, just north of the Rancho Bernardo community, and just south of the city's border with Escondido. When full, the reservoir covers 1,234 acres (4.99 km^{2}) and has a maximum water depth of 115 feet (35 m) and a shoreline of 27 miles (43 km). Lake Hodges is owned by the City of San Diego and supplies water to the San Dieguito Water District and Santa Fe Irrigation District.

Lake Hodges has a total capacity of 30,251 acre-feet (37,314,000 m^{3}) of water. The surface elevation of the lake is maintained at a maximum of 280 feet (85 m) above sea level, 35 feet (11 m) lower than the dam's spillway (315 feet; 96 m) to ensure safe operations. The lake level can fluctuate significantly, depending upon the amount of runoff received from the San Dieguito River drainage basin. Interstate 15 crosses Lake Hodges via the Lake Hodges Bridge.

Approximately 1,000 feet (300 m) west of the I-15 freeway bridge is a bicycle/pedestrian bridge which opened on May 15, 2009, and is the longest stressed ribbon bridge in the world.

== Lake Hodges Dam ==
Lake Hodges Dam is a multiple-arch dam that sits on the San Dieguito River. It was commissioned by the Volcan Water Company and designed by John S. Eastwood. It was completed in 1918 (108 years ago), and later purchased by the city of San Diego. Water from the Lake Hodges Reservoir services the customers of the Santa Fe Irrigation District and the San Dieguito Water District. The dam is 131 feet (40 m) tall and 729 feet (222 m) long.

In 2005, the San Diego County Water Authority, in conjunction with the City of San Diego, began work on a pipeline to connect Hodges Reservoir with Olivenhain Reservoir. The project was completed in 2012. The connection provides the ability to store 20,000 acre-feet (25,000,000 m^{3}) of water at Hodges Reservoir for emergency use. This system is also used to provide electrical power to the grid during high-demand times of the day. Water is pumped from Lake Hodges to Olivenhain at night when demand (and rates) for electricity is low. It is then flowed back down through generators during peak-demand times.

In 2019, a hypolimnetic aeration system was installed at the site of the former reservoir keeper's house with a Speece cone installed at the bottom of the lake between that location and Alva canyon.

Following the 2017 Oroville Dam crisis, the state of California conducted spillway inspections on all dams in the state. Hodges Dam did not pass inspection and, as a result, San Diego Public Utilities Department was ordered to keep the maximum level of the lake 20 feet (6.1 m) below the spillway.

Due to its advanced age, Lake Hodges had been closed to the public so the dam could undergo repair work. The water level was lowered in May 2022, when routine maintenance revealed cracks and defects, which turned the dam repairs into a yearlong process. On June 2, 2023, the dam, lake, and recreation area opened to the public again. Around 2034, the city expects to complete construction of a new dam to replace this one. The reservoir has to be kept at a low elevation of 280 feet (85 m) due to safety concerns, which means that the city cannot access the water.

== Recreation ==
Lake Hodges is a popular location for hiking, birding, fishing, kayaking, mountain biking, windsurfing, photography, and picnicking. It is surrounded by the hiking trails of the San Dieguito River Park, and those trails are connected to the park's 65 miles of trails.

The Audubon Society has proclaimed Lake Hodges and vicinity to be a Globally Important Bird Area. The ability to see almost 200 bird species attracts many birders as well as amateur and professional photographers.

Fishing is allowed 9 months of the year and near-record-sized largemouth bass have been caught in the lake.

== Environment ==
The riparian habitat surrounding the lake is home to nesting pairs of the least Bell's vireo, an endangered species. Two other threatened bird species, the California gnatcatcher and the coastal cactus wren, can be found in the areas around the lake.

When water levels are up, and remain consistent, it is possible to observe the courtship and parenting behaviors of the western grebe as well as Clark's grebe. Both species can be seen seasonally nesting at the shallow eastern end of the lake. However, the lake's pumping system can raise or lower the water level by quite a few inches every day; these fluctuations can potentially cause the raft-like, floating grebe nests to float to shore, run aground, and be at risk of predation by carnivorous animals. In the event that a nest is beached, it will be subsequently abandoned by the parents, especially if it is significantly out of their reach.

The city has a volunteer program called Kayaking For The Birds, managed by Friends of Lake Hodges, which maintains all of the lake's shoreline areas, keeping it free of discarded fishing line and other angling supplies, as well as all other litter which could pose a threat to birds and wildlife.

It is home to the Lake Hodges Colony of Argentine ants.

== See also ==
- Lake Hodges Bridge
- List of dams and reservoirs in California
- List of lakes in California

== Gallery ==
Landscape and vistas
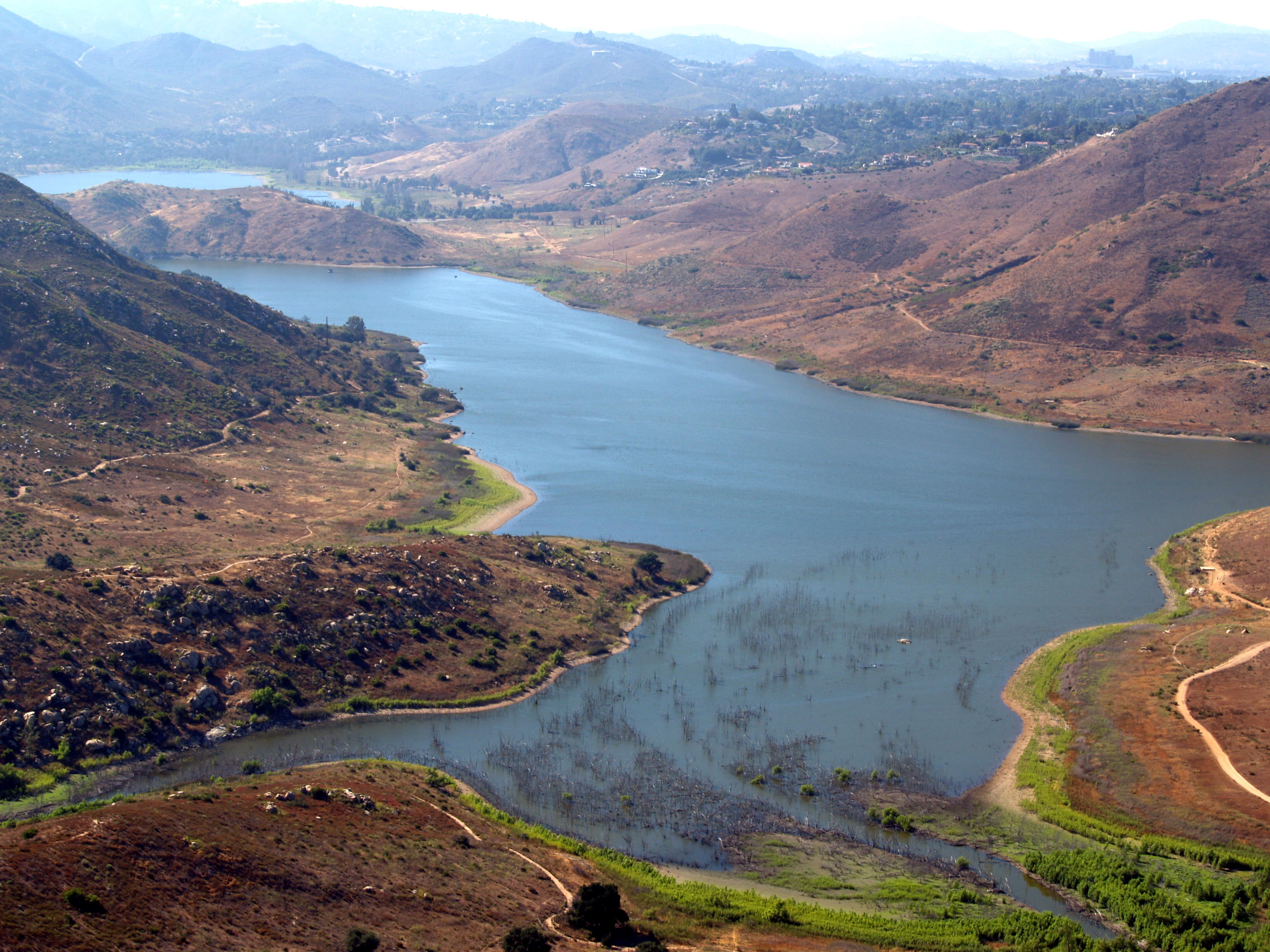
Aerial view of the lake looking toward the west

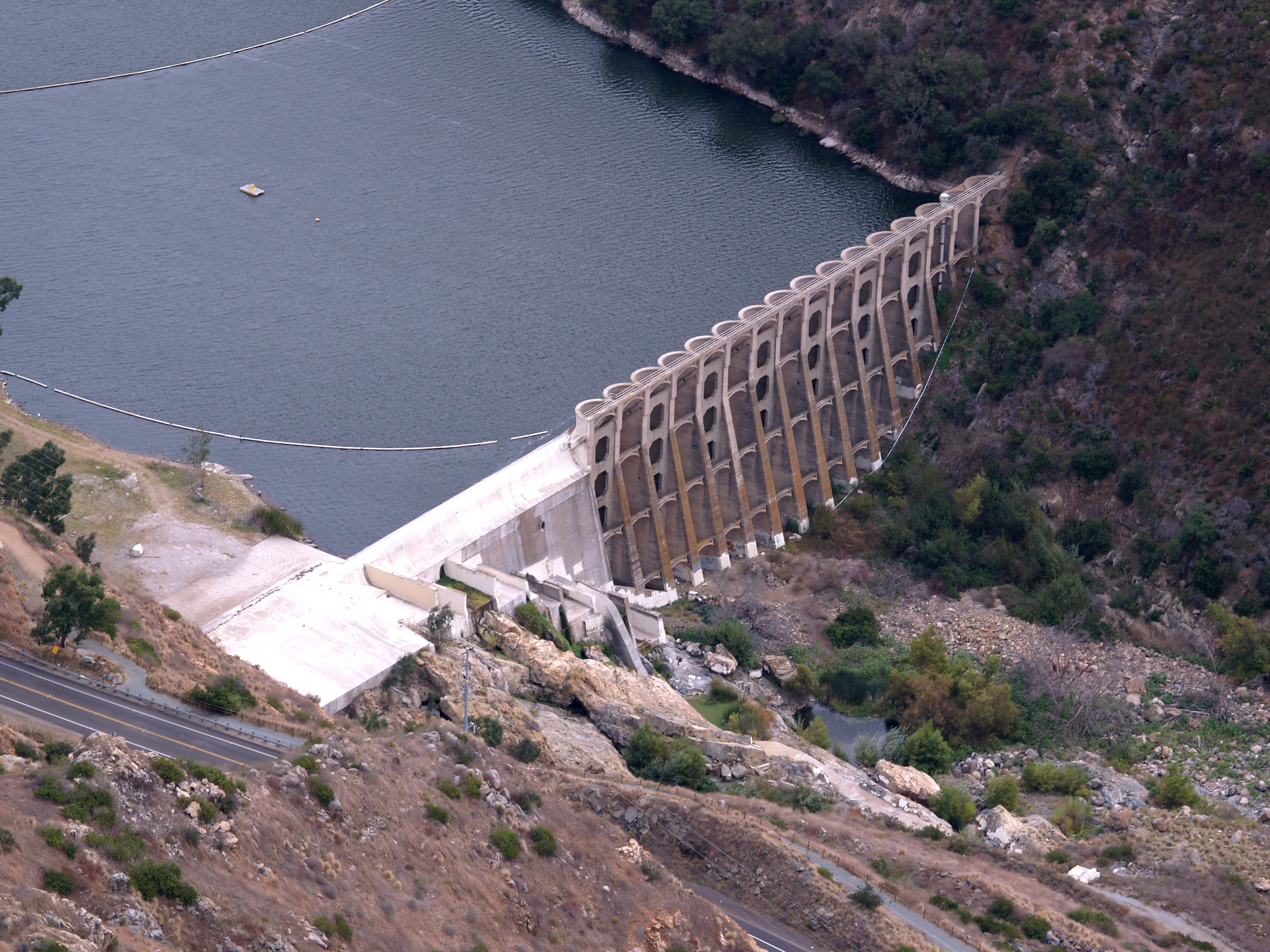
Aerial view of Lake Hodges Dam

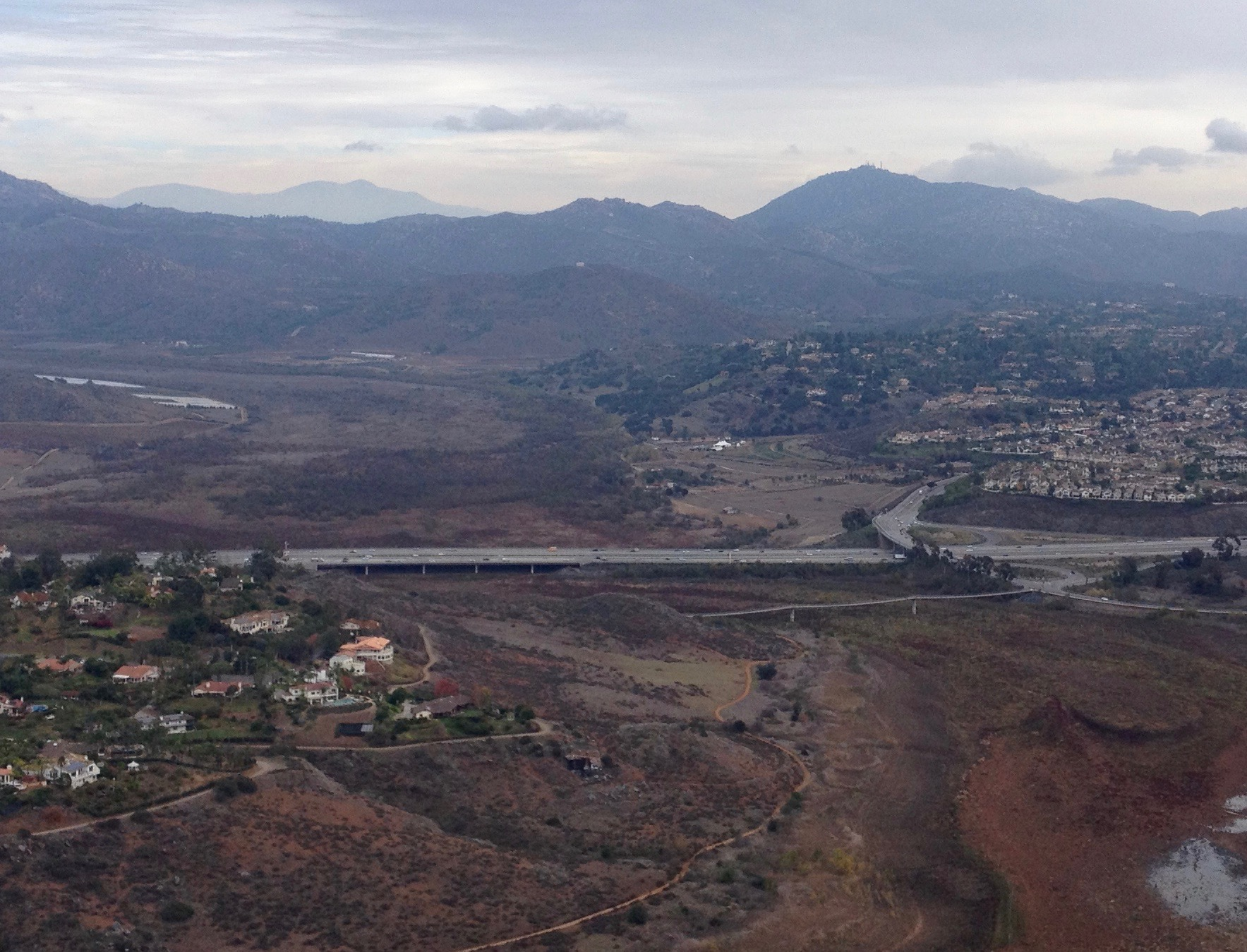
The eastern portion of Lake Hodges in near-dry conditions in 2013
