= Fort Edmonton Footbridge =

Pedestrian bridge in Edmonton, Canada

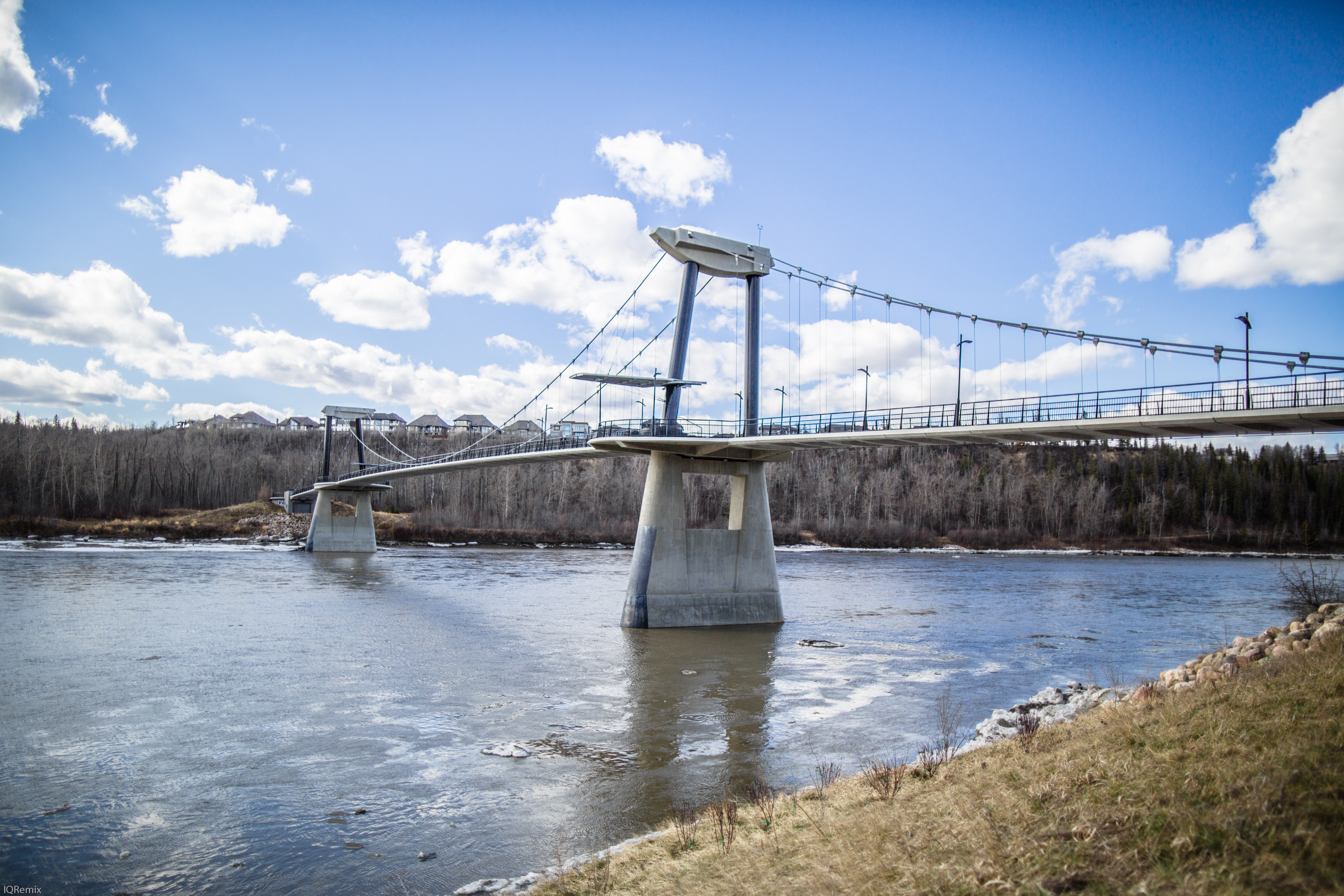
- Coordinates: 53°29′43″N 113°35′26″W
- Carries: Pedestrians and bicycles
- Crosses: North Saskatchewan River
- Locale: Edmonton, Alberta, Canada
- Official name: Fort Edmonton Footbridge
- Maintained by: City of Edmonton

Characteristics
- Design: Suspension bridge
- Material: Concrete
- Total length: 246 m (807 ft)
- Width: 5 m (16 ft)
- Longest span: 138 m (453 ft)
- No. of spans: 3
- Piers in water: 2

History
- Designer: HFKS Architects
- Engineering design by: CH2M Hill
- Construction start: August 2008
- Construction end: November 2010
- Opened: June 18, 2011

Location
- Interactive map of Fort Edmonton Footbridge

The Fort Edmonton Footbridge is a pedestrian bridge that crosses the North Saskatchewan River in Edmonton, Alberta, Canada. Led by CH2M Hill and designed by HFKS Architects, it is the city's first suspension bridge. The bridge is located southwest of Fort Edmonton Park and connects to the existing multi-use trail system with the new park land on the west side of the river. It officially opened on June 18, 2011.

== See also ==
- List of crossings of the North Saskatchewan River

Preceded by Terwillegar Park Footbridge	Bridge across the North Saskatchewan River	Succeeded by Quesnell Bridge
