= Interstate 15 in California =

North–south Interstate and state highway in California, United States

Interstate 15 and State Route 15
- I-15 highlighted in red, SR 15 in purple

Route information
- Maintained by Caltrans
- Length: 293.57 mi (Note: Mileage is the entire route, including both SR 15 and I-15) (472.46 km)
- Existed: 1957–present
- Component highways: SR 15 from 32nd Street in San Diego to I-8; I-15 from I-8 to Nevada state line

Major junctions
- South end: I-5 in San Diego
- I-805 in San Diego; I-8 in San Diego; I-215 in Murrieta; SR 91 in Corona; SR 60 in Jurupa Valley; I-10 in Ontario; SR 210 in Rancho Cucamonga; I-215 in San Bernardino; US 395 in Hesperia; I-40 in Barstow
- North end: I-15 at the Nevada state line in Primm, NV

Location
- Country: United States
- State: California
- Counties: San Diego, Riverside, San Bernardino

Highway system
- Interstate Highway System; Main; Auxiliary; Suffixed; Business; Future; State highways in California; Interstate; US; State; Scenic; History; Pre‑1964; Unconstructed; Deleted; Freeways
← SR 14	→ SR 16

Route 15, consisting of the contiguous segments of State Route 15 (SR 15) and Interstate 15 (I-15), is a major north–south state highway and Interstate Highway in the U.S. state of California, connecting San Diego, Riverside, and San Bernardino counties. The route consists of the southernmost 287.26 miles (462.30 km) of I-15, which extends north through Nevada, Arizona, Utah, Idaho, and Montana to the Canada–US border. It is a major thoroughfare for traffic between San Diego and the Inland Empire, as well as between Southern California; Las Vegas, Nevada; and the Intermountain West.

South of its junction at I-8 in San Diego, the highway becomes SR 15, extending about 5.59 miles (9.00 km) to I-5 in San Diego's Barrio Logan district, about 12.56 miles (20.21 km) from the Mexico–United States border, before the road runs about 0.55 miles (0.89 km) further to its terminus at 32nd Street, north of Harbor Drive. Though some maps and signs may mark SR 15 (or even I-15) as extending south through 32nd Street to Harbor Drive, the highway south of I-5 and Main Street is controlled by the City of San Diego instead of the state. The portion of Route 15 south of I-8 was initially signed as a state route because it was not up to Interstate standards, but it is being upgraded so it would become part of the Interstate Highway system in the future. In total, the entire length of Route 15 in California is 293.57 miles (472.46 km).

I-15 has portions designated as the Escondido Freeway, Avocado Highway, Temecula Valley Freeway, Corona Freeway, Ontario Freeway, Barstow Freeway, CHP Officer Larry L. Wetterling and San Bernardino County Sheriff's Lieutenant Alfred E. Stewart Memorial Highway, or Mojave Freeway. It is also known colloquially as "the 15" to residents of Southern California.

== Route description ==
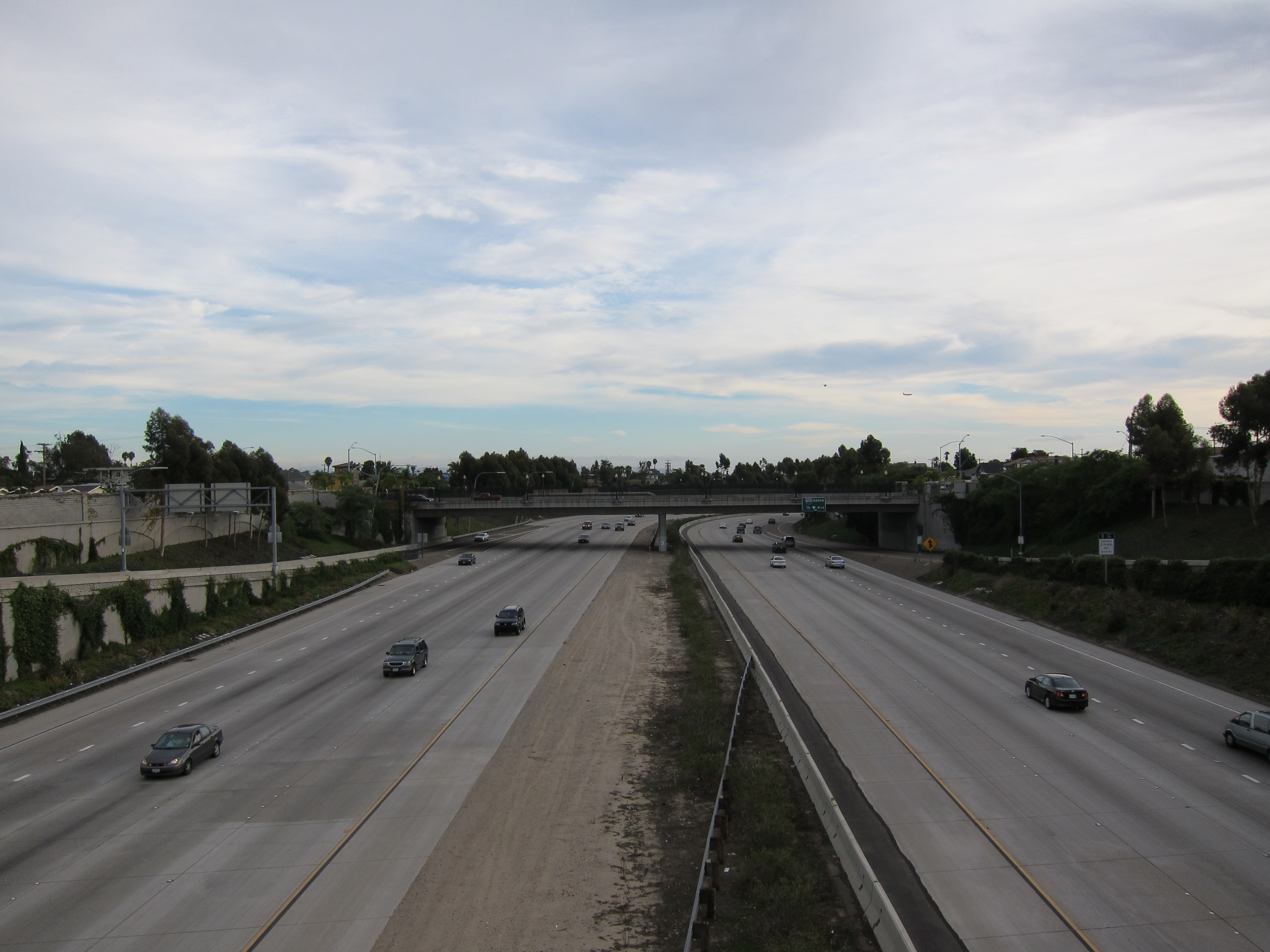
Looking south from the University Avenue overpass in San Diego

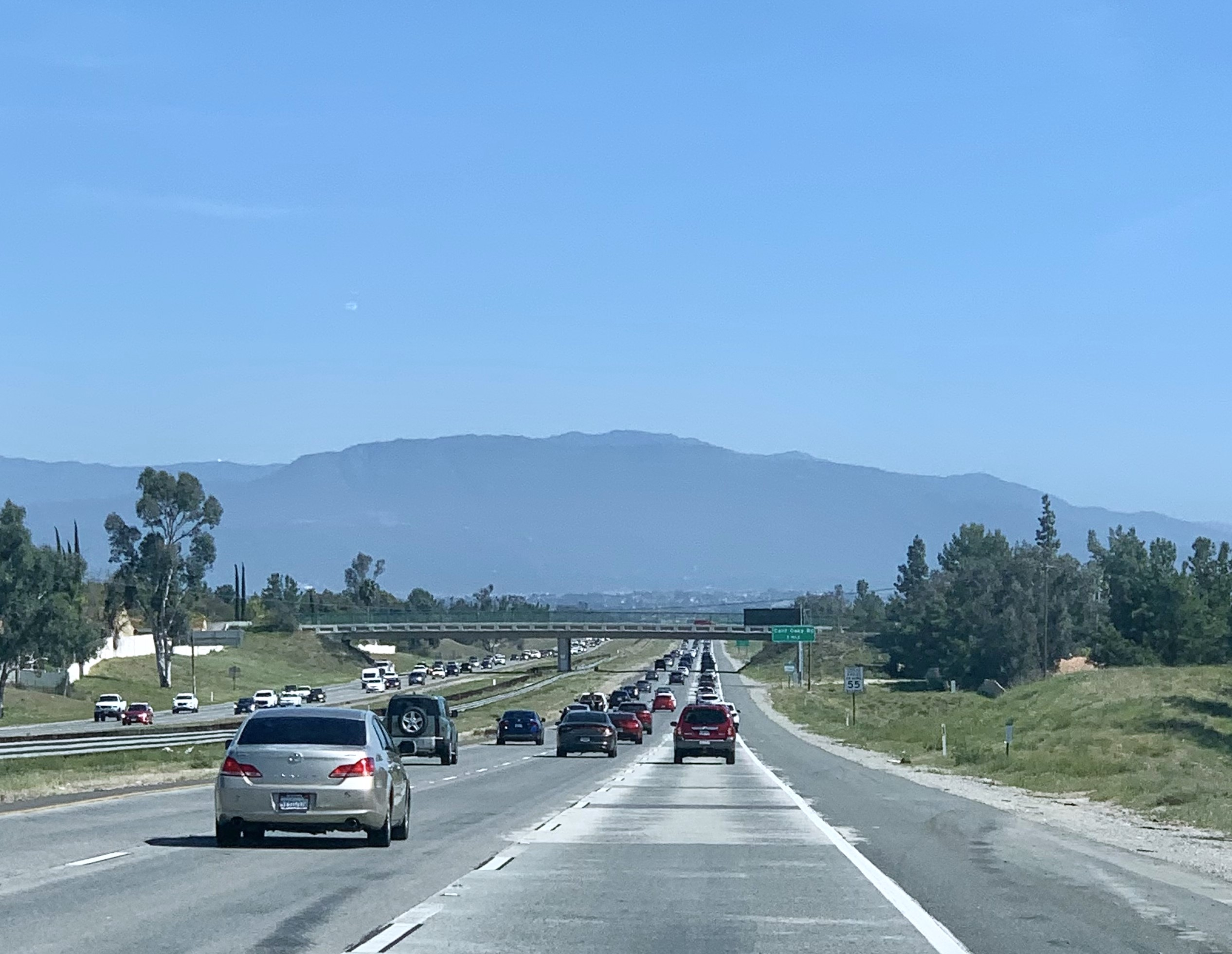
I-15 southbound entering the Temecula Valley in Murrieta

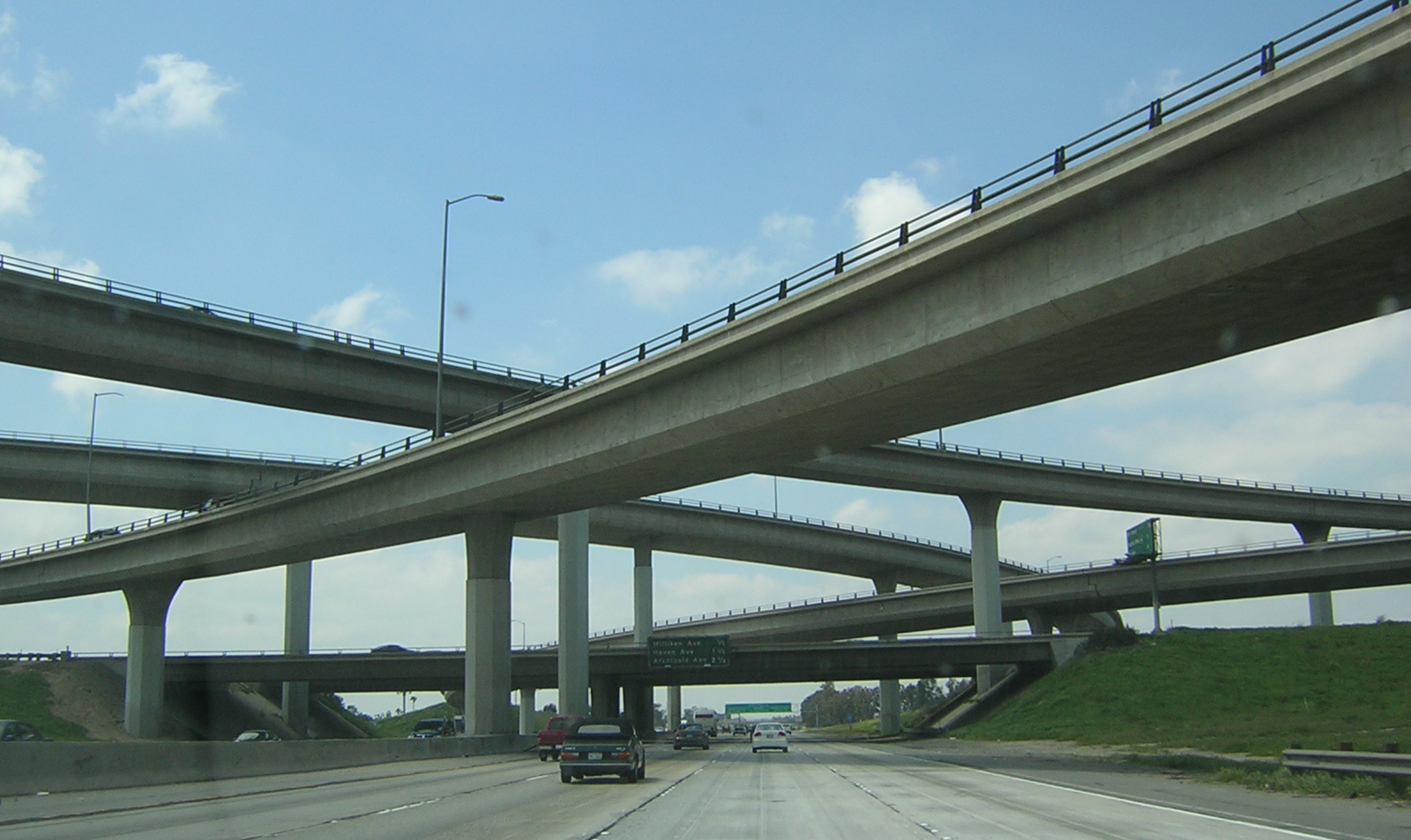
I-10/I-15 interchange in Ontario

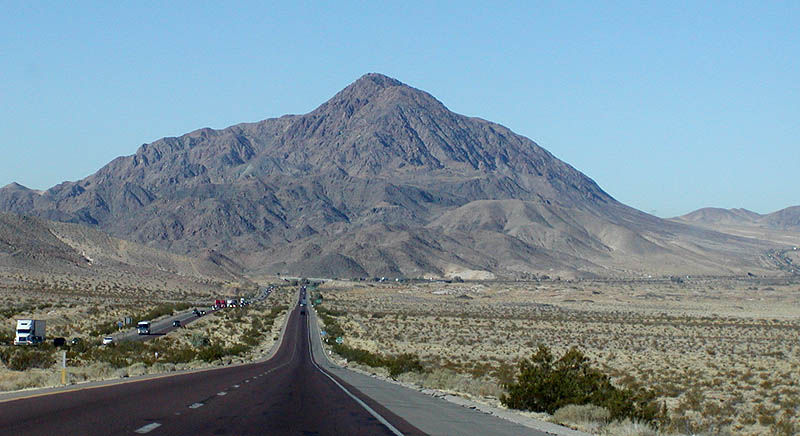
West of Baker, the freeway jogs north to pass Cave Mountain

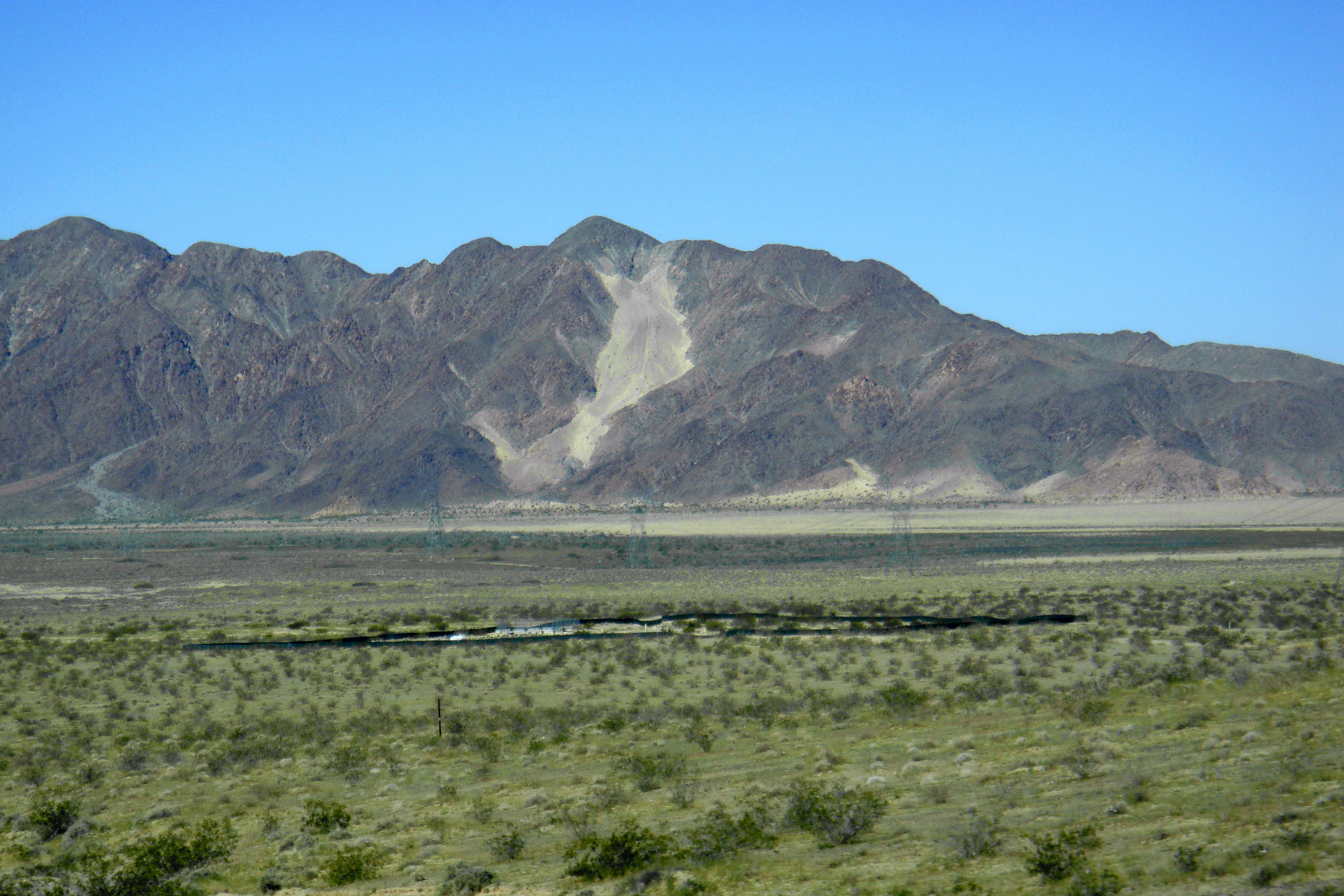
Cat Dune sand ramp, Cronese Mountains, southwest of Baker

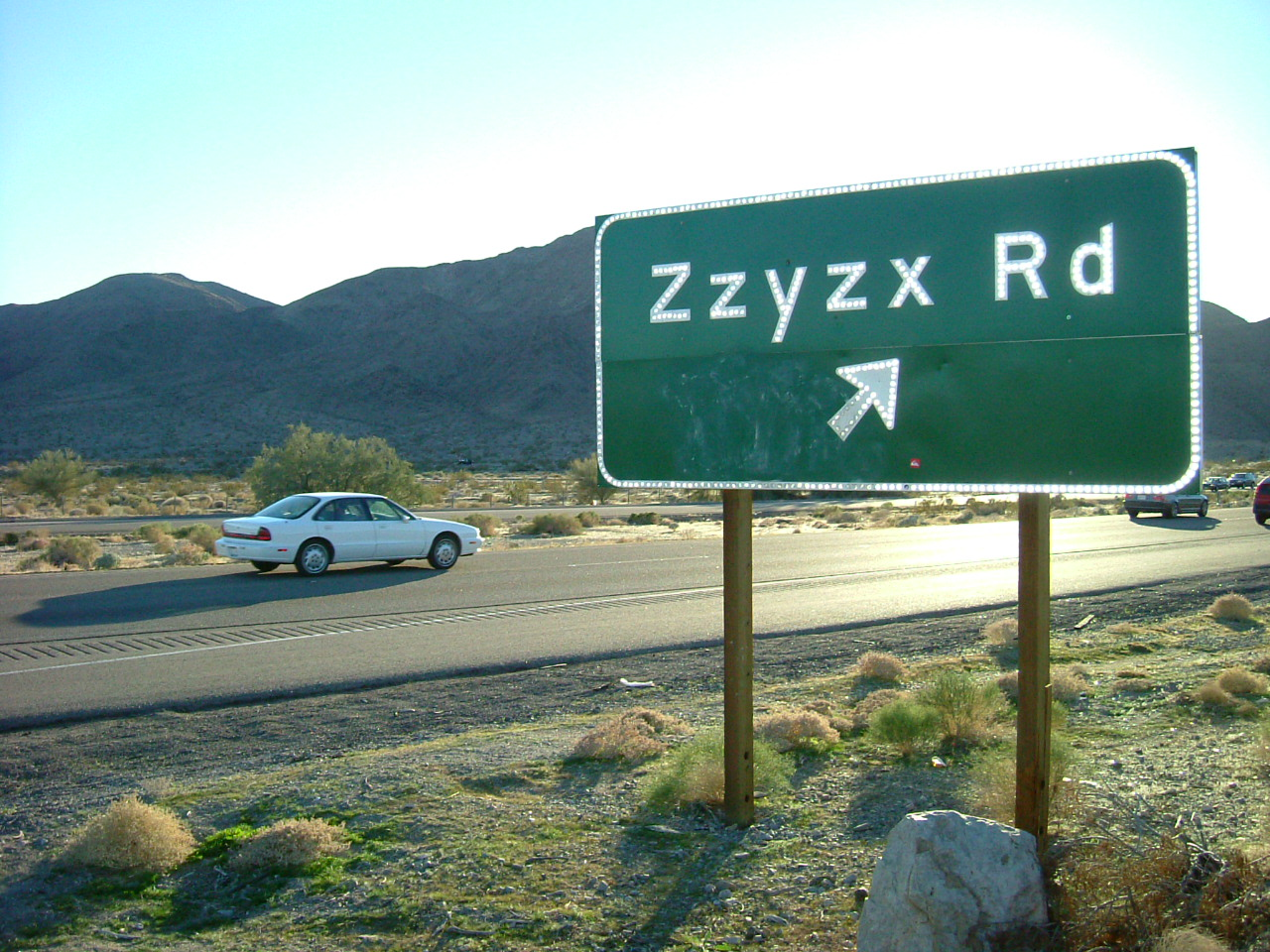
Exit to Zzyzx

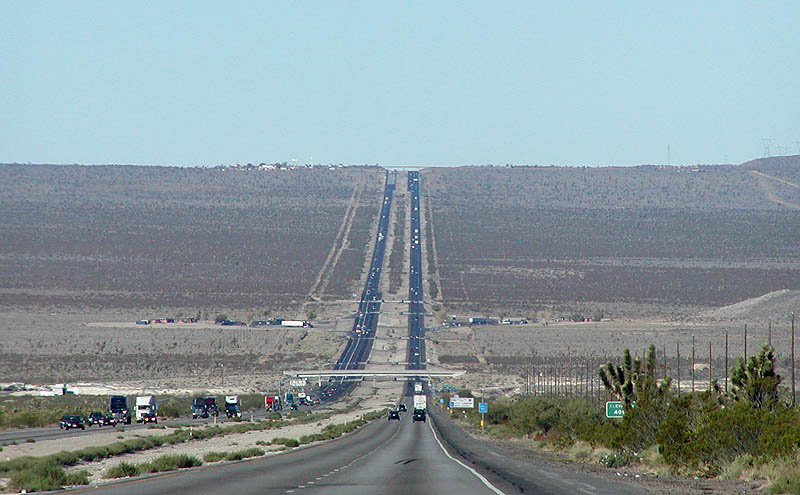
Southbound coming down into Shadow Valley. Halloran Summit is on the skyline, about 8 miles (13 km) away.

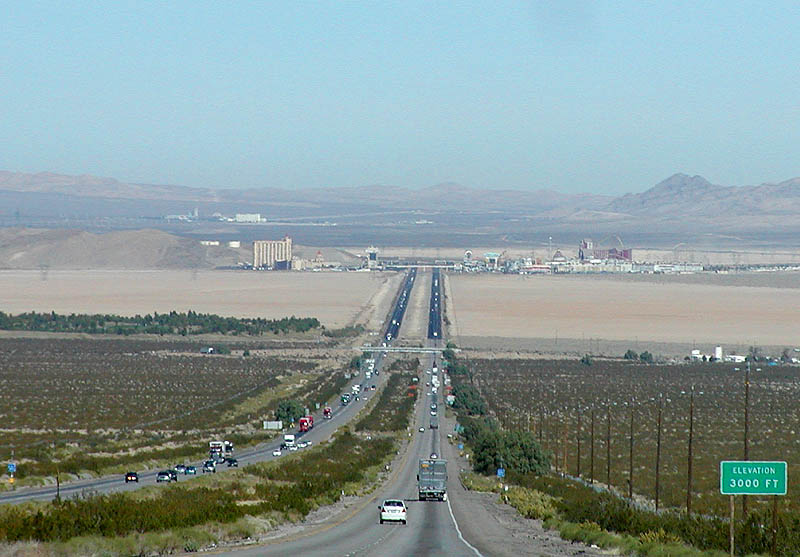
Northbound Interstate 15 descends from Mountain Pass Into the Ivanpah Valley. Primm on the state line between California and Nevada is seen 4 miles (6.4 km) down the freeway.

Route 15 is defined as follows in section 315 of the California Streets and Highways Code:

Route 15 is from:
(a) Route 5 in San Diego to Route 8.
(b) Route 8 to the Nevada state line near Stateline, Nevada via the vicinity of Temecula, Corona, Ontario, Victorville, and Barstow.

The section of Route 15 defined in subdivision (a) is not considered an Interstate Highway according to the Federal Highway Administration (FHWA)'s route logs.

I-15 and SR 15 are part of the California Freeway and Expressway System, and are part of the National Highway System, a network of highways that are considered essential to the country's economy, defense, and mobility by the Federal Highway Administration. I-15 from SR 76 to SR 91 and SR 58 to SR 127 is eligible to be included in the State Scenic Highway System, but it is not officially designated as a scenic highway by the California Department of Transportation.

=== San Diego County ===
SR 15 begins south of I-5 at 32nd Street, north of Harbor Drive. The southernmost segment from 32nd Street to Main Street is controlled by the City of San Diego instead of Caltrans. State control then begins at the Main Street interchange, immediately south of I-5. After crossing I-5, SR 15 has an interchange with SR 94, which has been cited as not being up to Interstate standards. The route then meets I-805; however, one can only continue in the same direction that they were going at this interchange, since the overall shape of this interchange is an elongated "X". Between the Polk Avenue and Orange Avenue overpasses, the freeway goes under a city park that was built on top of the freeway during construction in 2001. Pedestrian bridges were also built at Monroe Avenue and Landis Street to reduce the effects of the freeway geographically dividing the community. Between I-805 and I-8, SR 15 follows the former alignment of 40th Street, which was its former routing as a city street. It continues seamlessly into the southern terminus of I-15 at I-8; on the northbound conversion to I-15 at I-8, there is no "End SR 15" sign.

There are various local names for the highway, such as the Escondido Freeway between San Diego and Escondido. I-15 between SR 163 and Pomerado Road / Miramar Road is known as the Semper Fi Highway in recognition of the nearby Marine Corps Air Station Miramar. I-15 between Scripps Poway Parkway and Camino Del Norte is known as the Tony Gwynn Memorial Freeway in recognition of Tony Gwynn, who played baseball for the San Diego Padres and San Diego State. North of the Escondido city limits, it is known as the Avocado Highway, whose designation ends upon entering Temecula. There are other local names as noted below.

Heading northward, I-15 currently begins at I-8, at the same place that its continuation, SR 15, begins its southward journey. I-15 goes through Mission Valley and Kearny Mesa, intersecting with SR 52 just before merging with SR 163. After traversing the Marine Corps Air Station Miramar, I-15 comes into Rancho Peñasquitos, where it meets the eastern end of SR 56. Northward, the route crosses Lake Hodges inside the upper San Diego city limits. I-15 continues north into Escondido, where it intersects with SR 78.

North of Escondido, I-15 goes through hilly terrain and farmland, passes under the Lilac Road Bridge and approaches the community of Fallbrook near the SR 76 interchange. It passes the community of Rainbow, crosses the Riverside county line and descends into the Inland Empire.

=== Inland Empire ===
In Temecula, I-15 runs concurrently with SR 79 for 3.2 miles (5 km) before the latter branches off toward Hemet. In Murrieta, I-15 splits from its only auxiliary route in California, I-215, which retains the Escondido Freeway designation and runs through the two largest cities in the Inland Empire, Riverside and San Bernardino. I-15 continues northwest as the Temecula Valley Freeway.

I-15 runs along the eastern edge of the Santa Ana Mountains, passing through the cities of Wildomar and Lake Elsinore. In Lake Elsinore, I-15 intersects SR 74, a major highway connecting the city with San Juan Capistrano as well as points east such as Perris, Hemet, Idyllwild, and the Coachella Valley. It continues northwest through the unincorporated area of Temescal Valley as the Corona Freeway and passes through the city of Corona. During this stretch, I-15 has an interchange with SR 91, a major east–west highway; this interchange serves as a vital link between southwestern Riverside County and Orange County. North of SR 91, I-15 continues through the city of Norco, crosses the Santa Ana River, and heads due north along the boundary between the cities of Eastvale and Jurupa Valley. I-15 enters San Bernardino County just past an interchange with SR 60, another major east–west highway, which connects I-15 with the Chino Valley and the southern San Gabriel Valley. I-15 passes through the city of Ontario on its way to I-10, the main east–west artery though Southern California. North of I-10, I-15 passes through the cities of Rancho Cucamonga and Fontana as it intersects SR 210, an east–west highway skirting the San Gabriel and San Bernardino mountain ranges. SR 210 connects I-15 to major foothill communities such as Pasadena, Rialto, and San Bernardino. I-15 also crosses old US 66 during this stretch of highway, which is signed as SR 66, Foothill Boulevard. At this junction, I-15 takes a strongly northeastern alignment as it moves to rejoin with its spur route, I-215, in Devore, in northern San Bernardino. The highway then heads northward and upward through the Cajon Pass, an important mountain pass that is the primary route between Southern California and points further north and east.

The portion of I-15 that is located between its northern and southern junctions with I-215 is also used by many local residents as the major north–south route for the western portions of the San Bernardino–Riverside–Ontario metropolitan area. (I-215 serves a similar function in the eastern portion of the metropolitan area. These two highways are also the only continuous north–south freeways in the area.)

North of Limonite Avenue (south of SR 60), I-15 is known as the Ontario Freeway (formerly known as the Devore Freeway prior to 1989). After its northern merge with I-215 in Devore, I-15 is called the Barstow Freeway or the Mojave Freeway. A short section between SR 138 and Oak Hill Road is also designated as the CHP Officer Larry L. Wetterling and San Bernardino County Sheriff's Lieutenant Alfred E. Stewart Memorial Highway, named after two officers killed in the line of duty. On this stretch of highway, I-15 northbound splits from I-15 southbound, where the road ascends up a steep grade until it reaches Cajon Summit (elevation 4,260 feet (1,300 m)) just south of the High Desert communities of Hesperia and Oak Hills. Tractor-trailer trucks headed southbound are required to travel at the posted speed limit of 45 mph (72 km/h) or less due to the steep downward grade. The southbound lanes provide a runaway truck ramp as a safety feature. The two halves of the highway rejoin shortly before reaching Cajon Summit.

North of the Cajon Pass, I-15 traverses the High Desert cities of Hesperia, where it meets the southern end of US 395, and Victorville. I-15 passes through desert for 25 miles (40 km) before reaching Barstow, where it meets the eastern terminus of SR 58 and the western terminus of I-40. It then passes Zzyzx Road more than 50 miles (80 km) later, before reaching the town of Baker. The sign for Zzyzx Road—alphabetically the last place name in the world—is a landmark of sorts on the drive between Los Angeles and Las Vegas. Northeast of Baker, I-15 passes through the Halloran Summit near Halloran Springs at an elevation of over 4,000 feet (1,200 m), then descends into the Shadow Valley before ascending again through the Mountain Pass at an elevation of 4,730 feet (1,440 m). A runaway truck ramp is provided for northbound I-15 traffic near the dry Ivanpah Lake at the end of Mountain Pass. I-15 then crosses the Nevada state line at the casino town of Primm, Nevada, 40 miles (64 km) southwest of Las Vegas.

The Mojave Freeway is fairly busy on weekdays, since it connects the rapidly growing exurbs of the Victor Valley with the Los Angeles area. On weekends and holidays, however, it can sometimes be jammed with Californians driving to Las Vegas for short vacations.

=== Express lanes ===
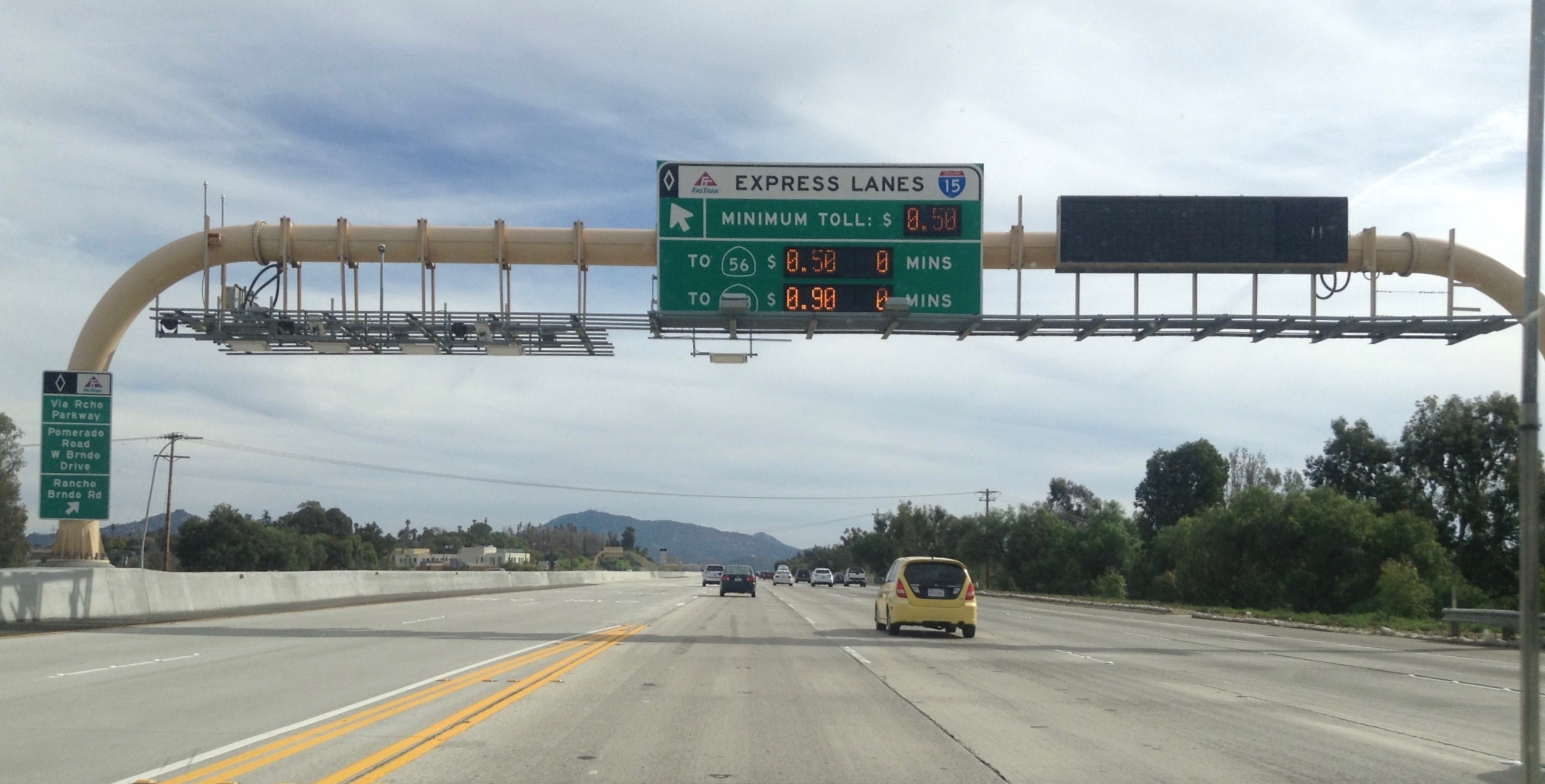
The southbound I-15 Express Lanes near Escondido. Note the variable fees for the minimum toll, and for the rates to travel to either SR 56 or SR 163.

There are two sections of high-occupancy toll (HOT) lanes along I-15. The first section is in San Diego County between SR 163 in San Diego and SR 78 in Escondido. The lanes were originally constructed as reversible carpool lanes in 1988 before they were converted into express lanes a decade later. Between 2004 and 2008, construction extended the lanes north from SR 56 to Del Lago Boulevard in Escondido. Then, between 2009 and 2012, work was done to widen the southern reversible segment from two lanes to four, and then extend the corridor north to SR 78. The lanes, dubbed a "highway within a highway", include a movable "zipper" barrier for 16 miles (26 km), which can be changed to create an extra lane as demand allows. In addition, five direct access ramps allow for easier local access, as well as access to bus service from MTS Rapid. These express lanes carry the hidden state highway designation of Route 15S (for "supplemental").

The second segment of HOT lanes is in Riverside County, featuring one to two tolled express lanes in each direction from Cajalco Road in Corona to Cantu-Galleano Ranch Road near SR 60 at the Eastvale–Jurupa Valley line. These lanes began construction in 2018 and opened in 2021.

As of January 2026, some toll policies differ between the counties. The HOT lanes in San Diego County are simply branded as the "I-15 Express Lanes" and are administered by the San Diego Association of Governments (SANDAG). The ones in Riverside County are branded as "Riverside Express" and are administered by the Riverside County Transportation Commission (RCTC). In both segments, solo drivers are tolled using a congestion pricing system based on the real-time levels of traffic. All tolls are collected using an open road tolling system, and therefore there are no toll booths to receive cash.

For the segment in Riverside County, carpools with three or more people and motorcycles are not charged. Each vehicle is required to carry a FasTrak Flex transponder with its switch set to indicate the number of the vehicle's occupants (1, 2, or 3+). Solo drivers and carpools with two people may also use the FasTrak standard tag without the switch. Drivers without any FasTrak tag will be assessed a toll violation regardless of whether they qualified for free.

For the segment in San Diego County, each solo driver is required to carry a FasTrak transponder, while carpools and motorcycles are not charged. SANDAG does not use or offer the switchable FasTrak Flex tags directly, and instead instructs those drivers who do qualify for free to just remove their FasTrak tag off their windshield or cover it in the provided mylar bag to avoid being charged.

There are long-range plans to extend the Riverside County segment at least as far south as SR 74 (Central Avenue) in Lake Elsinore. A separate project would extend the express lanes from Cantu-Galleano Ranch Road into San Bernardino County as far north as Duncan Canyon Road in Fontana. Phase 1 of the San Bernardino County extension started construction in March 2025 up to just north of Foothill Boulevard.

== History ==
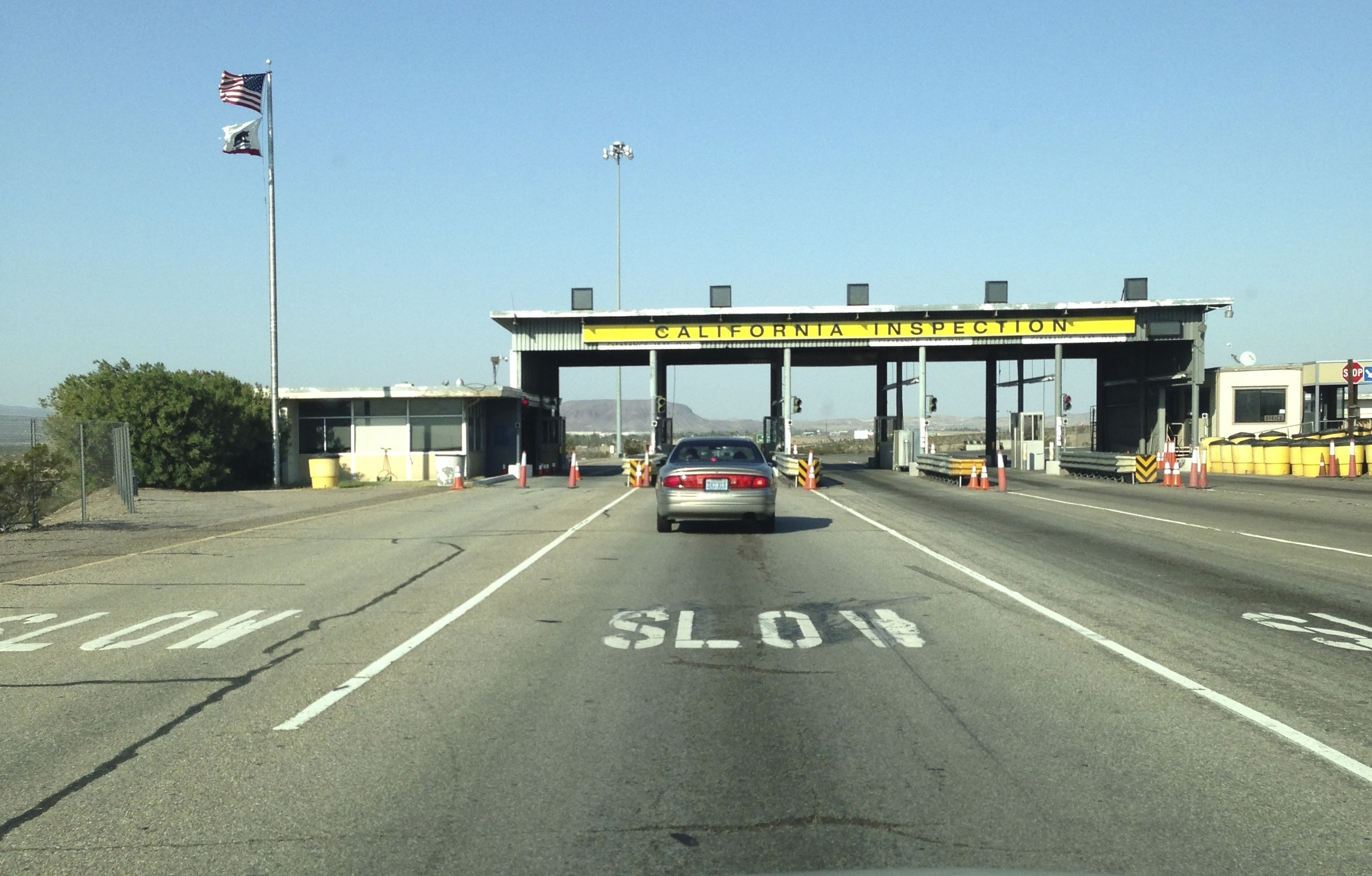
Former southbound agricultural inspection station near Yermo

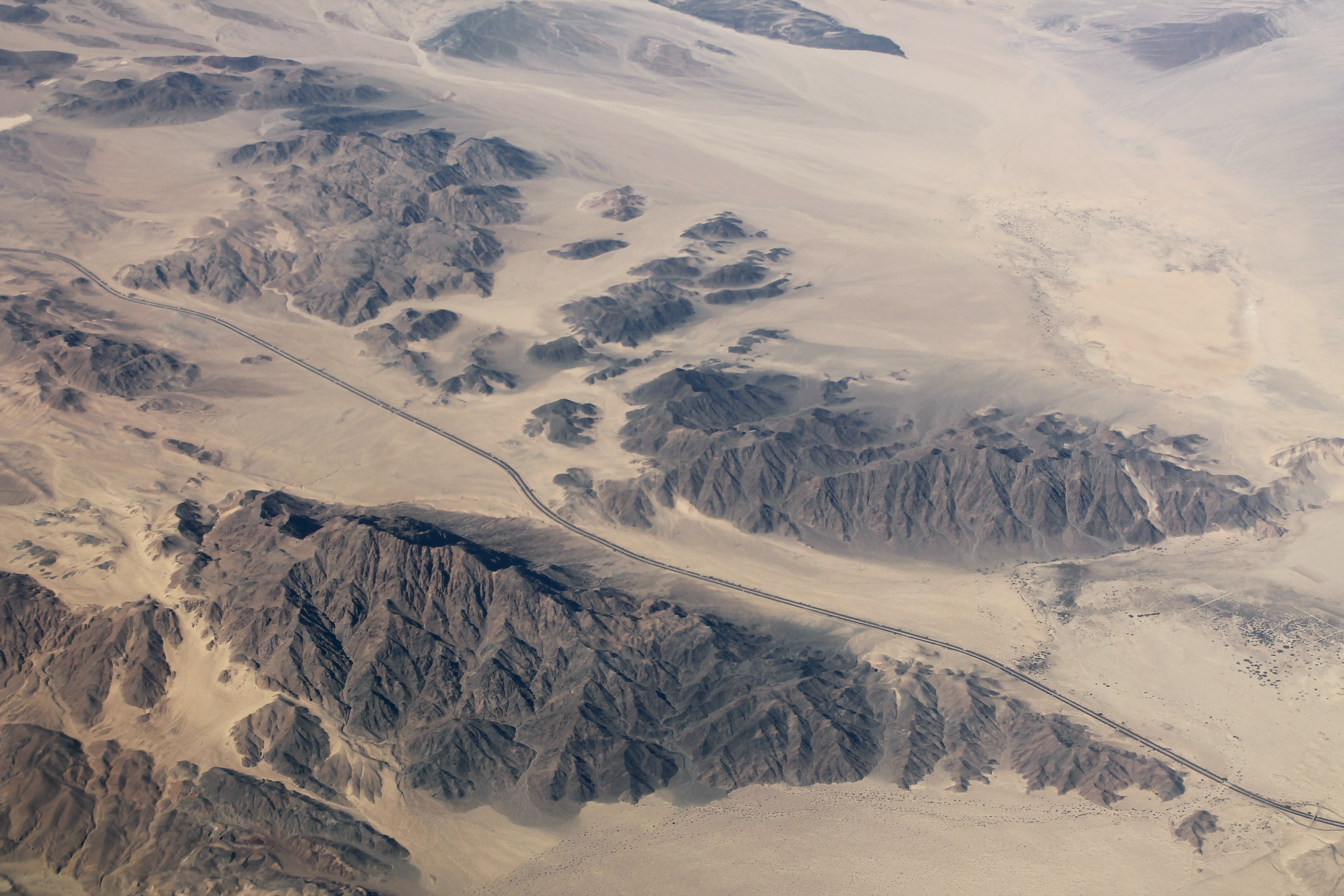
Mojave Freeway in San Bernardino County, California

I-15 replaced US 395 between San Diego and Temecula, US 66 between San Bernardino and Barstow, and US 91 north of Barstow.

I-15 was initially planned to run from I-10 near San Bernardino along the current I-215 alignment then up through the Cajon Pass and on to Las Vegas, with a distance of 186.24 miles (299.72 km) within the state. California successfully argued in favor of the addition south to San Diego, suggesting that the freeway would connect the major military bases, the former March AFB (now March ARB) and the former NAS Miramar (now MCAS Miramar). US 395 was then signed TEMP-15 and the "old" I-15 between Devore and San Bernardino became part of modern-day I-215.

On January 24, 1957, the State Highway Commission defined the Escondido Freeway as what are now Routes 15 and 215 from Route 805 to Route 91. This entire segment was previously US 395 when it was named. Since then, the definition was extended on Route 15 south to Route 8 by Assembly Concurrent Resolution 34, Chapter 67 in 1979. Meanwhile, the segment of Route 15 from the San Diego County Line to the I-15/I-215 interchange was named the Temecula Valley Freeway in 1990.

The original definition for the Corona Freeway, as named by the State Highway Commission on July 23, 1958, stated that it was "Routes 71, 91, and 15 from Route 10 West of Pomona to Route 215".

This legal definition has been amended twice: First, in 1990, the California Assembly passed Concurrent Resolution 125, Chapter 78, renaming I-15 between the San Diego County Line (which is further south from I-215) and Bundy Canyon Road near Lake Elsinore as the Temecula Valley Freeway.

Then, in 1993, the California Assembly passed legislation officially designating SR 71 as a part of the Chino Valley Freeway. However, the "Corona Freeway" name is sometimes still applied to this portion of SR 71; thus, despite the official change, guide signs on I-10 eastbound and SR 57 southbound at the Kellogg Interchange in Pomona continued to refer to SR 71 as the "Corona Freeway" until the signs were replaced some time later.

Present SR 15 was signed after the creation of I-15 in 1968. Since I-15's southern terminus was at I-8, SR 15 was signed mostly along 40th Street and Wabash Boulevard in San Diego to its merge with I-5. The portion between Adams Avenue and I-805 in City Heights remained a city street for a long time, forcing drivers to take detours or drive through city streets to get downtown. This portion was not fully completed until January 2000, becoming one of the last freeways built in San Diego . For this reason, the freeway is sometimes referred to as the 40th Street Freeway.

Before the completion of the freeway, from 1968 through 1992, the San Diego neighborhood was known for prostitution, drugs, driveby shootings, and gangs. This was indirectly caused by Caltrans' plans to build a freeway in this area on land where houses were located. Because families did not want to live in these houses since they would be soon torn down, they rented them to individuals who were only going to be in the area on a temporary basis, many of whom were involved in illegal activities. Even though the freeway was officially added to the Caltrans proposals as early as 1968, it was not until March 1992 that construction began after they succeeded to evict residents to make way for it. Many in the city opposed the building of this freeway, although some petitioned for the freeway to be built because of the poor conditions in the neighborhood.

Most of I-15 has undergone major improvements from Devore to the Nevada State Line, beginning in 2002 and costing $349 million. These improvements were designed to improve traffic flow on the heavily traveled highway for those going to and from Las Vegas. Most of the construction was completed by winter 2009. Projects include adding 39 miles (63 km) of truck lanes on hills at various locations, repaving 76 miles (122 km) of I-15 at various locations, adding exit numbers, renovating and rehabilitating the rest area between Baker and the Nevada State Line (Valley Wells Rest Area), reconstructing bridges in Baker, and moving the agriculture inspection station from Yermo to the Nevada State Line and including a truck weigh station. The new agricultural inspection station opened in August 2018.

=== State Route 31 ===
State Route 31
- Location: Corona - Ontario
- Existed: 1934–1974

In 1933, I-15 was defined as Legislative Route 193, running from pre-1964 Legislative Route 43 (present SR 91) in Corona to pre-1964 Legislative Route 9 (now SR 66), and was extended north to pre-1964 Legislative Route 31 (present I-15 and I-215) in 1935. The piece south of US 60 (Mission Boulevard), running along North Main Street, Hamner Avenue, and Milliken Avenue, was state-maintained by 1955, but was not assigned a signed number. This was still the only existing piece in 1963, and had a planned freeway replacement to the east.

In the 1964 renumbering, the route was assigned as SR 31. It was added to the Interstate Highway System in February 1972 as a realignment of I-15 (the former alignment became I-15E). However, as soon as the reroute was made, the cities of San Bernardino and Riverside voiced concerns that this new routing, which completely bypassed their city centers, would have a negative effect on their development plans. Together, these cities devised a plan in which the new western route via Corona and Ontario would become Interstate 15W, while US 395 would be renumbered Interstate 15E, regardless of the actual non-Interstate status of the latter route. Legislative changes were made in 1974, eliminating SR 31 (along with SR 71 south of Corona) in favor of I-15W. However, SR 31 continued to be signed—as temporary I-15W—until present I-15 was finished. (A 1986 map shows state maintenance continuing north past SR 60 to Jurupa Street, where it turned east to I-15.)

== Future ==
The segment signed as California SR 15 from I-5 to I-8 in San Diego is planned to be redesignated as part of I-15 once this segment is completely upgraded to Interstate standards, namely where the freeway's interchange with SR 94 is concerned. The interchange currently has left-exits and blind merges, and is due to be updated with a long-awaited widening of both SR 15 and SR 94. At that time, SR 15 is planned to be signed as part of I-15. The remaining portion of SR 15 conforms with Interstate standards.

In December 2018, the San Bernardino County Transportation Authority (SBCTA) approved the final environmental document for an 8-mile section of the San Bernardino County I-15 Express Lanes Project, spanning from Cantu-Galleano Ranch Road in Riverside County to Foothill Boulevard near Rancho Cucamonga. Construction on this section of express lanes is expected to be complete by 2028.

In 2020, Brightline signed a 50-year lease for use of the I-15 right-of-way between the Victor Valley and Nevada border for use in their Brightline West high-speed rail service.

== Exit list ==
County	Location	mi	km	Exit	Destinations	Notes
San Diego	San Diego	0.00	0.00		32nd Street to Harbor Drive	At-grade intersection; southern end of SR 15
San Diego	San Diego	0.41	0.66	1A	Main Street	Southbound exit and northbound entrance; southern end of state maintenance
San Diego	San Diego	0.55	0.89	1B	I-5 north – Los Angeles	Southbound exit and northbound entrance; I-5 exit 13A
San Diego	San Diego	0.55	0.89	1C	I-5 south – National City, Chula Vista	Southbound exit and northbound entrance; I-5 exit 13A
San Diego	San Diego	0.77	1.24	1D	Ocean View Boulevard	Signed as exit 1 northbound
San Diego	San Diego	1.07	1.72		Imperial Avenue	Exit removed in the late 1990s to conform SR 15 with federal highway minimum spacing requirements between adjacent interchanges
San Diego	San Diego	1.85	2.98	2A	Market Street	
San Diego	San Diego	2.23	3.59	2B-C	SR 94 (M. L. King Jr. Freeway) / Home Avenue	Signed as exits 2B (east) and 2C (west) northbound; southbound exit to SR 94 east is via exit 3; SR 94 exits 2A-C
San Diego	San Diego	3.37	5.42	3	I-805 north – Los Angeles	Northbound exit and southbound entrance; I-805 south exit 14
San Diego	San Diego	3.37	5.42	3	I-805 south to SR 94 east	Southbound exit and northbound entrance; I-805 north exit 14
San Diego	San Diego	4.67	7.52	5A	University Avenue – City Heights Transit Plaza	
San Diego	San Diego	5.05	8.13	5B	El Cajon Boulevard (Historic US 80) – Boulevard Transit Plaza	Former US 80
San Diego	San Diego	5.61	9.03	6A	Adams Avenue	
San Diego	San Diego	6.14	9.88	6B	I-8 / Camino del Rio South – Beaches, El Centro	Northern end of SR 15; southern end of I-15; I-8 exits 7A-B
San Diego	San Diego	6.82	10.98	7	Friars Road – Snapdragon Stadium	Interchange reconfiguration project scheduled to be completed in November 2025
San Diego	San Diego	8.37	13.47	8	Aero Drive	
San Diego	San Diego	9.25	14.89	9	Balboa Avenue / Tierrasanta Boulevard	Former eastern end of SR 274
San Diego	San Diego	10.00	16.09	10	Clairemont Mesa Boulevard	Southbound exit is part of exit 11
San Diego	San Diego	10.58	17.03	11	SR 52	SR 52 exit 7
San Diego	San Diego			—	I-15 Express Lanes (San Diego County)	Southern end of Express Lanes (unsigned SR 15S)
San Diego	San Diego			—	SR 163 south	Express Lanes access only; southbound exit and northbound entrance
San Diego	San Diego	12.13	19.52	12	SR 163 south (Cabrillo Freeway) – Downtown	Southbound exit and northbound entrance; former US 395 south
San Diego	San Diego	13.34	21.47	13	Miramar Way	Serves Marine Corps Air Station Miramar
San Diego	San Diego	14.29	23.00	14	Miramar Road / Pomerado Road	Former US 395 north
San Diego	San Diego	15.01	24.16	15	Carroll Canyon Road	
San Diego	San Diego			—	Hillery Drive – Mira Mesa	Express Lanes access only
San Diego	San Diego	15.93	25.64	16	Mira Mesa Boulevard	
San Diego	San Diego	17.32	27.87	17	Mercy Road / Scripps Poway Parkway	
San Diego	San Diego	17.82	28.68	Los Peñasquitos Creek Bridge		
San Diego	San Diego	18.18	29.26	18	Poway Road (CR S4) / Rancho Peñasquitos Boulevard	
San Diego	San Diego			—	SR 56 west / Ted Williams Parkway	Express Lanes access only; northbound exit and southbound entrance
San Diego	San Diego			—	Sabre Springs-Peñasquitos Transit Station	Express Lanes access only
San Diego	San Diego	19.48	31.35	19	SR 56 west (Ted Williams Freeway) / Ted Williams Parkway	SR 56 exit 9
San Diego	San Diego	20.58	33.12	21	Carmel Mountain Road	
San Diego	San Diego	21.92	35.28	22	Camino del Norte	
San Diego	San Diego	22.94	36.92	23	Bernardo Center Drive	
San Diego	San Diego			—	George Cooke Express Drive – Rancho Bernardo	Express Lanes access only
San Diego	San Diego	23.69	38.13	24	Rancho Bernardo Road	
San Diego	San Diego	26.03	41.89	26	Pomerado Road (CR S5) / West Bernardo Drive	Former US 395 south
San Diego	San Diego	26.20	42.16	Lake Hodges Bridge		
San Diego	Escondido	26.98	43.42	27	Via Rancho Parkway	
San Diego	Escondido			—	Del Lago Boulevard / Beethoven Drive	Express Lanes access only
San Diego	Escondido	27.66	44.51	28	Centre City Parkway (I-15 Bus. north)	Northbound exit and southbound entrance; former US 395 north
San Diego	Escondido	28.77	46.30	29	Felicita Road / Citracado Parkway	
San Diego	Escondido	30.10	48.44	30	9th Avenue / Auto Park Way	
San Diego	Escondido	30.63	49.29	31	Valley Parkway (CR S6) – Downtown Escondido	
San Diego	Escondido			—	Hale Avenue	Express Lanes access only; northbound exit and southbound entrance
San Diego	Escondido			—	I-15 Express Lanes (San Diego County)	Northern end of Express Lanes (unsigned SR 15S)
San Diego	Escondido	31.52	50.73	32	SR 78 – Oceanside, Ramona	SR 78 east exit 17A-B; west exit 17
San Diego	Escondido	32.87	52.90	33	El Norte Parkway	
San Diego	Escondido	33.92	54.59	34	Centre City Parkway (I-15 Bus. south) / Country Club Lane	Southbound exit and northbound entrance; former US 395 south
San Diego		36.64	58.97	37	Deer Springs Road (CR S12) / Mountain Meadow Road	
San Diego	Bonsall	40.85	65.74	41	Gopher Canyon Road / Old Castle Road	
San Diego	Bonsall	43.29	69.67	43	Old Highway 395	Former US 395
San Diego	Bonsall	44.24	71.20	Lilac Road Bridge		
San Diego		46.49	74.82	46	SR 76 – Pala, Oceanside	
San Diego	Fallbrook	50.59	81.42	51	Mission Road (CR S13) – Fallbrook	
San Diego–Riverside county line	Rainbow	54.08	87.03	54	Rainbow Valley Boulevard	Serves southbound weigh station
Riverside		55.36	89.09	US Border Patrol checkpoint (northbound only)		
Riverside		55.36	89.09	Weigh station (northbound only)		
Riverside	Temecula	57.70	92.86	58	Temecula Parkway to SR 79 south – Warner Springs, Indio	Former SR 71 south; former SR 79 south
Riverside	Temecula	59.25	95.35	59	Rancho California Road / Old Town Front Street	
Riverside	Temecula	60.88	97.98	61	Winchester Road to SR 79 north	Former SR 79 north
Riverside	Temecula–Murrieta line	61.68	99.26	62	French Valley Parkway	Southbound exit only
Riverside	Murrieta	63.00	101.39	63	I-215 north (Escondido Freeway north) – Riverside, San Bernardino	Northbound exit and southbound entrance; southbound access is via exit 64; former I-15E north / US 395 north
Riverside	Murrieta	63.73	102.56	64	Murrieta Hot Springs Road to I-215 north – Riverside	“To I-215” not signed northbound
Riverside	Murrieta	64.86	104.38	65	California Oaks Road / Kalmia Street	
Riverside	Wildomar	67.90	109.27	68	Clinton Keith Road	
Riverside	Wildomar	69.34	111.59	69	Wildomar Trail	Formerly Baxter Road
Riverside	Wildomar	70.56	113.56	71	Bundy Canyon Road	
Riverside	Lake Elsinore	73.43	118.17	73	Diamond Drive / Railroad Canyon Road	
Riverside	Lake Elsinore	75.21	121.04	75	Main Street (I-15 Bus. north)	
Riverside	Lake Elsinore	76.54	123.18	77	SR 74 (Central Avenue) – San Juan Capistrano, Perris	
Riverside	Lake Elsinore	78.12	125.72	78	Nichols Road	
Riverside	Lake Elsinore	80.95	130.28	81	Lake Street (I-15 Bus. south)	
Riverside	Temescal Valley	84.67	136.26	85	Indian Truck Trail	
Riverside	Temescal Valley	87.54	140.88	88	Temescal Canyon Road	Former SR 71
Riverside	Corona	89.91	144.70	90	Weirick Road / Dos Lagos Drive	
Riverside	Corona	91.08	146.58	91	Cajalco Road	
Riverside	Corona			—	I-15 Riverside Express Lanes	Southern end of Express Lanes
Riverside	Corona	92.08	148.19	92	El Cerrito Road	
Riverside	Corona	92.96	149.60	93	Ontario Avenue	Former SR 71
Riverside	Corona	94.62	152.28	95	Magnolia Avenue	
Riverside	Corona			—	91 Express Lanes west	Express Lanes access only
Riverside	Corona	95.77	154.13	96A	SR 91 west (Riverside Freeway) – Beach Cities	Signed as exit 96 northbound; former US 91; SR 91 exit 51
Riverside	Corona	95.77	154.13	96B	SR 91 east (Riverside Freeway) – Riverside	Signed as exit 96 northbound; former US 91; SR 91 exit 51
Riverside	Corona–Norco line	97.14	156.33	97	Hidden Valley Parkway	Formerly Yuma Drive
Riverside	Norco	97.90	157.55	98	Second Street (I-15 Bus. north)	
Riverside	Norco	99.87	160.73	100	Sixth Street (I-15 Bus. south)	
Riverside	Eastvale–Jurupa Valley line	102.53	165.01	103	Limonite Avenue	
Riverside	Eastvale–Jurupa Valley line	104.62	168.37	105	Cantu-Galleano Ranch Road	
Riverside	Eastvale–Jurupa Valley line			—	I-15 Riverside Express Lanes	Northern end of Express Lanes
Riverside	Eastvale–Jurupa Valley line			—	I-15 San Bernardino Express Lanes (Phase 1)	Southern end of express lanes-under construction; planned to open in 2028
Riverside	Eastvale–Jurupa Valley line	105.74	170.17	106A	SR 60 east (Pomona Freeway) – Riverside	SR 60 east exit 41, west exit 41B
Riverside	Eastvale–Jurupa Valley line	105.74	170.17	106B	SR 60 west (Pomona Freeway) – Los Angeles	SR 60 east exit 41, west exit 41B
San Bernardino	Ontario	107.56	173.10	108	Jurupa Street / Auto Center Drive	Former SR 31 south
San Bernardino	Ontario	108.94	175.32	109A	I-10 west (San Bernardino Freeway) – Los Angeles	former US 99; I-10 east exits 58A-B; west exit 58
San Bernardino	Ontario	108.94	175.32	109B	I-10 east (San Bernardino Freeway) – San Bernardino	former US 99; I-10 east exits 58A-B; west exit 58
San Bernardino	Rancho Cucamonga	109.60	176.38	110	4th Street, Ontario Mills Drive	
San Bernardino	Rancho Cucamonga	111.85	180.01	112	SR 66 (Foothill Boulevard)	Former US 66
San Bernardino	Rancho Cucamonga			—	I-15 San Bernardino Express Lanes (Phase 1)	Northern end of express lanes-under construction; planned to open in 2028
San Bernardino	Rancho Cucamonga–Fontana line	113.26	182.27	113	Base Line Road	
San Bernardino	Rancho Cucamonga–Fontana line	114.64	184.50	115A	SR 210 east (Foothill Freeway) – San Bernardino	Signed as the reverse southbound; SR 210 exit 64A; future I-210
San Bernardino	Rancho Cucamonga–Fontana line	114.64	184.50	115B	SR 210 west (Foothill Freeway) – Pasadena	Signed as the reverse southbound; SR 210 exit 64A; future I-210
San Bernardino	Fontana	116.20	187.01	116	Summit Avenue	
San Bernardino	Fontana	117.58	189.23	118	Duncan Canyon Road	
San Bernardino	Fontana–Rialto line	119.39	192.14	119	Sierra Avenue	
San Bernardino		122.20	196.66	122	Glen Helen Parkway	
San Bernardino	San Bernardino	122.92	197.82	123	I-215 south (Barstow Freeway south) / Devore Road	Northbound signage; former I-15E / US 91 / US 395 south / US 66 west; I-215 north exit 54B
San Bernardino	San Bernardino	122.92	197.82	—	I-15 Truck north / Kenwood Avenue	South end of truck bypass
San Bernardino	San Bernardino	122.92	197.82	123	I-215 south (Barstow Freeway south) – San Bernardino, Riverside	Southbound signage; former I-15E / US 91 / US 395 south / US 66 west
San Bernardino	San Bernardino	122.92	197.82	—	I-15 Truck south	North end of truck bypass
San Bernardino	San Bernardino	124.10	199.72	124	Kenwood Avenue	Southbound signage
San Bernardino		129.15	207.85	129	Cleghorn Road	
San Bernardino		130.00	209.21	Weigh station		
San Bernardino		130.51	210.04	131	SR 138 – Palmdale, Silverwood Lake	
San Bernardino		135.33	217.79	Cajon Summit, elevation 4,260 feet (1,300 m)		
San Bernardino	Hesperia	137.76	221.70	138	Oak Hill Road	
San Bernardino	Hesperia	139.53	224.55	140	Ranchero Road	
San Bernardino	Hesperia	141.47	227.67	141	US 395 north – Bishop, Adelanto	Northbound exit and southbound entrance; southern end of US 395
San Bernardino	Hesperia	141.47	227.67	141	Joshua Street to US 395 north	Southbound exit and northbound entrance
San Bernardino	Hesperia	143.14	230.36	143	Main Street – Hesperia, Phelan	
San Bernardino	Hesperia–Victorville line	146.73	236.14	147	Bear Valley Road – Lucerne Valley	
San Bernardino	Victorville	147.96	238.12	148	La Mesa Road / Nisqualli Road	
San Bernardino	Victorville	149.65	240.84	150	SR 18 west (Palmdale Road / I-15 BL north / Historic US 66 east)	Southern end of SR 18 overlap; former US 66 east / US 91 north
San Bernardino	Victorville	150.57	242.32	151A	Roy Rogers Drive	
San Bernardino	Victorville	151.17	243.28	151B	Mojave Drive	
San Bernardino	Victorville	152.63	245.63	153A	SR 18 east (D Street / I-15 BL south / Historic US 66) – Apple Valley	Northern end of SR 18 overlap; former US 66 / US 91
San Bernardino	Victorville	152.71	245.76	153B	E Street	Northbound exit and entrance
San Bernardino	Victorville	153.54	247.10	154	Stoddard Wells Road	
San Bernardino	Apple Valley	156.65	252.10	157	Stoddard Wells Road – Bell Mountain	
San Bernardino	Apple Valley	161.25	259.51	161	Dale Evans Parkway – Apple Valley	
San Bernardino		165.10	265.70	165	Wild Wash Road	
San Bernardino		169.30	272.46	169	Hodge Road	
San Bernardino	Barstow	174.98	281.60	175	Outlet Center Drive	
San Bernardino	Barstow	177.91	286.32	178	Lenwood Road	
San Bernardino	Barstow	179.25	288.47	179	SR 58 west – Bakersfield	SR 58 east exit 234 to I-15 south, no exit number to I-15 north
San Bernardino	Barstow	180.76	290.91	181	L Street (I-15 BL east) / West Main Street (CR 66)	
San Bernardino	Barstow	182.69	294.01	183	SR 247 south (Barstow Road)	
San Bernardino	Barstow	183.56	295.41	184A	I-40 east – Needles	Northbound exit and southbound entrance; southbound access is via exit 184; western terminus of I-40
San Bernardino	Barstow	184.09	296.26	184B	East Main Street (I-15 Bus. / CR 66) to I-40 – Needles	Signed as exit 184 southbound; “to I-40” not signed northbound; former US 66
San Bernardino	Barstow	186.03	299.39	186	Old Highway 58 west	Former US 91 south/US 466/SR 58 west
San Bernardino		188.74	303.75	189	Fort Irwin Road	Serves Fort Irwin
San Bernardino		190.98	307.35	191	Ghost Town Road	Serves the ghost town of Calico
San Bernardino	Yermo	193.78	311.86	194	Calico Road – Yermo, Calico	
San Bernardino	Yermo	195.52	314.66	196	Yermo Road – Yermo	
San Bernardino		196.00– 196.50	315.43– 316.24	Agricultural Inspection Station (closed; was southbound only)		
San Bernardino		197.63	318.05	198	Minneola Road	
San Bernardino		205.55	330.80	206	Harvard Road	
San Bernardino		212.78	342.44	213	Field Road	
San Bernardino		216.76	348.84	Clyde V. Kane Rest Area (Exit 217)		
San Bernardino		220.73	355.23	221	Afton Road	
San Bernardino		229.57	369.46	230	Basin Road	
San Bernardino		233.38	375.59	233	Rasor Road	
San Bernardino		239.32	385.15	239	Zzyzx Road – Zzyzx	
San Bernardino	Baker	244.95	394.21	245	Baker Boulevard (I-15 Bus. north) – Baker	Northbound exit and southbound entrance; former US 91 north / US 466 east
San Bernardino	Baker	245.72	395.45	246	SR 127 north / Kelbaker Road – Death Valley	
San Bernardino	Baker	247.60	398.47	248	Baker Boulevard (I-15 Bus. south) – Baker	Southbound exit and northbound entrance; former US 91 south / US 466 west
San Bernardino		258.75	416.42	259	Halloran Springs Road	
San Bernardino		264.71	426.01	265	Halloran Summit Road	
San Bernardino		270.29	434.99	Valley Wells Rest Area (Exit 270)		
San Bernardino		271.88	437.55	272	Cima Road	
San Bernardino		280.61	451.60	281	Bailey Road	
San Bernardino		285.60	459.63	286	Nipton Road	
San Bernardino				Agricultural Inspection Station (southbound only); opened in 2018		
San Bernardino		290.54	467.58	291	Yates Well Road	
San Bernardino		293.57	472.46		I-15 north – Las Vegas	Continuation into Nevada
1.000 mi = 1.609 km; 1.000 km = 0.621 mi: Closed/former; Concurrency terminus; Electronic toll collection; Incomplete access; Route transition; Unopened

== Related routes ==
I-215 is the only auxiliary Interstate Highway associated with I-15 in California. It is a bypass of I-15, running between Murrieta and San Bernardino. I-215 connects the city centers of both Riverside and San Bernardino, while I-15 runs to the west through Corona and Ontario.

Business routes of Interstate 15 exist in Escondido, Lake Elsinore, Norco, Victorville, Barstow, and Baker.

== Notes ==
Interstate 15
Previous state: Terminus	California	Next state: Nevada
