= Lilac Road Bridge =

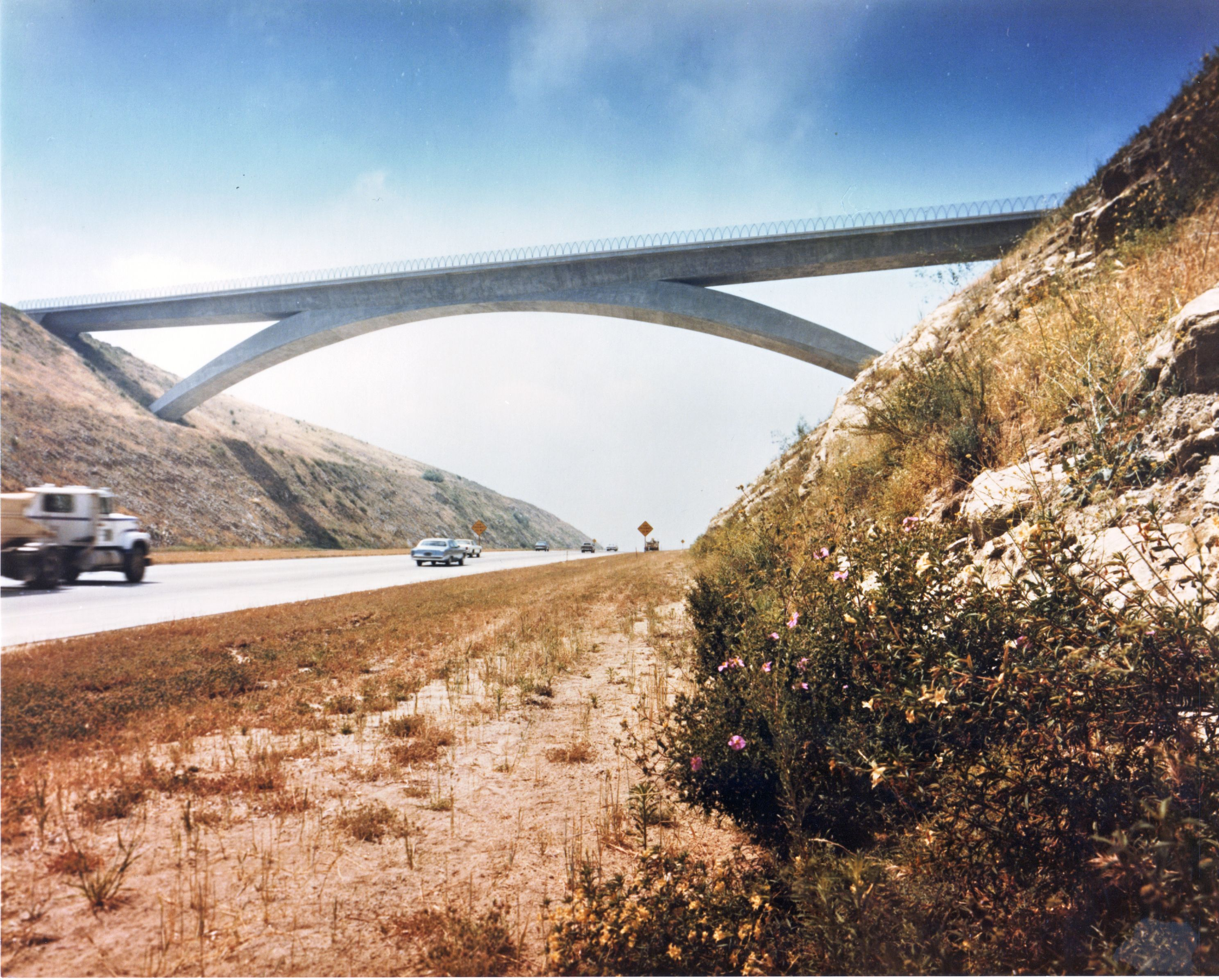
- Lilac Road Bridge (1980)
- Coordinates: 33°18′1.0″N 117°9′0.0″W
- Carries: Lilac Road
- Crosses: I-15
- Locale: Bonsall, California
- Official name: Walter F. Maxwell Memorial Bridge

Characteristics
- Material: Reinforced concrete
- Total length: 745 ft (227 m)
- Longest span: 455 ft (139 m)

History
- Designer: Fred G. Michaels, John Suwada of Caltrans William Wells (consultant), Project Engineer Richard J.LeBeau of Caltrans
- Construction cost: $1,500,000
- Opened: 1978

Location
- Interactive map of Lilac Road Bridge

The Lilac Road Bridge, officially the Walter F. Maxwell Memorial Bridge, is a reinforced concrete arch bridge in Bonsall, California, built in 1978 at a cost of $1.5 million (equivalent to $7.4 million in 2025). It carries Lilac Road over Interstate 15 (I-15). Its main span is 455 feet (139 m), with a total length of 745 feet (227 m). It was designed by Fred G. Michaels and John Suwada, with architecture consulting by William Wells. The bridge is officially named after civil engineer Walter F. Maxwell, who helped build over 570 bridges and structures across Southern California.

This bridge is one of the two overcrossings in San Diego County with this arch design, the other being the Eastgate Mall Bridge. When traveling northbound on I-15 it is the high bridge before exit 46/State Route 76.
