= Leonel Viera Bridge =

Bridge in Uruguay

Lionel Viera Bridge
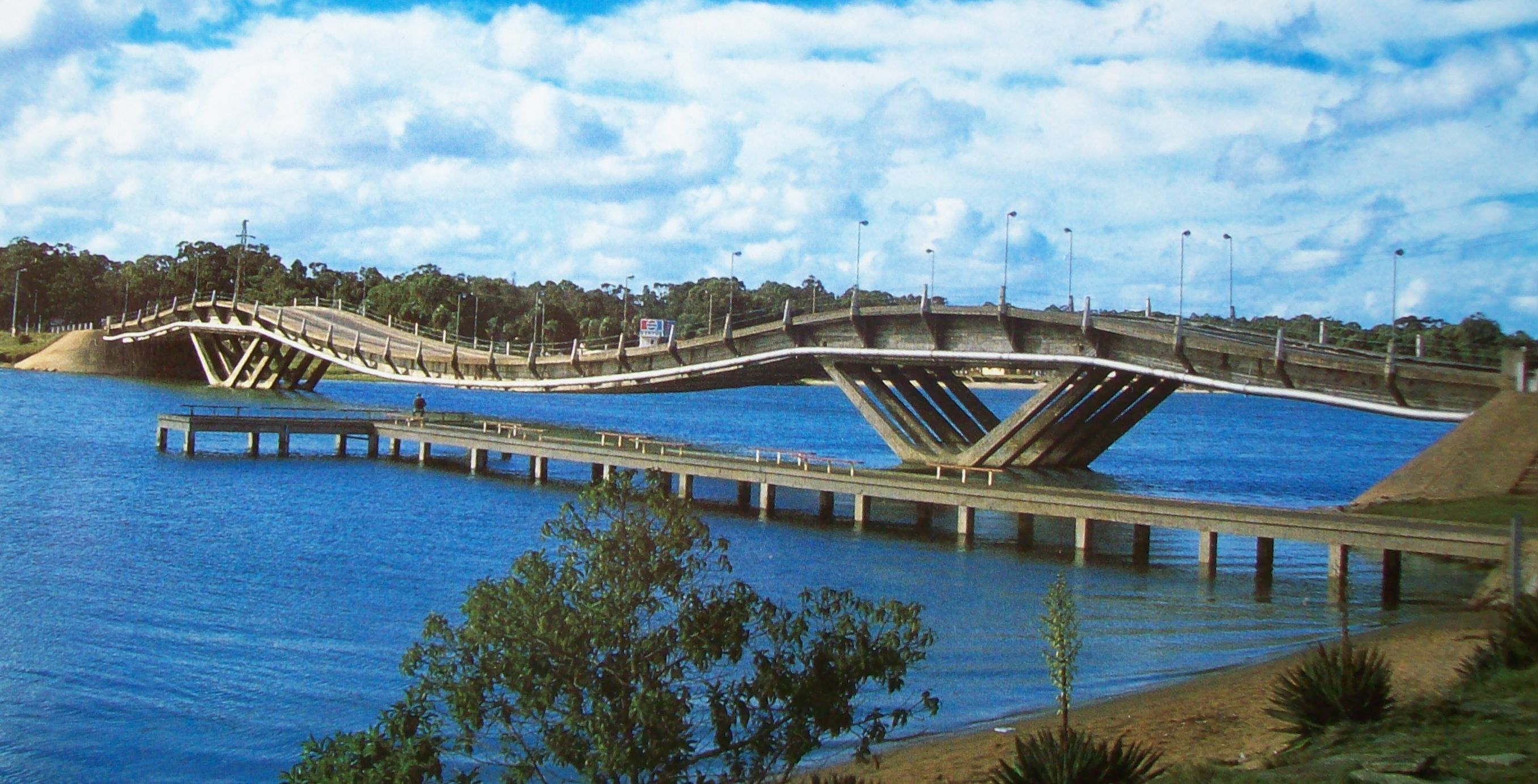
- Coordinates: 34°54′39.2″S 54°52′21″W
- Carries: Uruguay Route 10
- Crosses: Maldonado Creek
- Locale: Punta del Este-La Barra
- Official name: Puente Lionel Viera

Characteristics
- Design: Stressed ribbon bridge
- Material: Concrete
- Total length: 150 m (490 ft)
- Width: 10 m (33 ft)
- Longest span: 90 m (300 ft)
- No. of spans: 3
- Piers in water: 2

History
- Designer: Lionel Viera
- Construction start: 1963
- Opened: 1965

Location
- Interactive map of Lionel Viera Bridge

The Lionel Viera Bridge, also known as the Puente de la Barra and Maldonado Bridge, is a stressed ribbon bridge linking the cities of Punta del Este and La Barra across the Maldonado Creek in southern Uruguay. The bridge is a landmark of both the local beach communities and of Uruguay.

== History ==
A man by the last name Martínez, the first owner of the La Barra hotel, La Posta del Cangrejo, convinced the then Uruguayan president Eduardo Víctor Haedo to build a bridge linking that town with Punta del Este. Historically, there have been two bridges built at the same crossing of the Maldonado River, each of which failed due to natural disasters.

The bridge was designed by builder Leonel Viera (1913–1975). Viera pioneered the construction sequence now typical for concrete segment bridges of this type. After placement of the principal cables, precast concrete tiles were placed to form the initial structure. The cables were then prestressed by loading sandbags upon the tiles, followed by final concretization of the gaps between tiles. Removal of the sandbags then compressively stressed the concrete structure, enhancing its stiffness and durability under load. The overall structure of the bridge would have a main span of 90 m (295 ft) with two shorter 30 m (98 ft) spans linking the main span to the shore. The ingenious design and later construction of the bridge propelled Viera to national fame.

In 1998, a contract was awarded to engineer Alberto Ponce Delgado to twin the bridge 20 meters (65 ft) upstream of the original span. A study commissioned in 1999 found that the original span was in need of repairs, which were later completed in 2005.

== See also ==
- List of bridges in Uruguay
