= List of bridges in Uruguay =

This list of bridges in Uruguay lists bridges of particular historical, scenic, architectural or engineering interest. Road and railway bridges, viaducts, aqueducts and footbridges are included.

Name	Locality	Date	Image	Notes
Leonel Viera Bridge	Punta del Este-La Barra	1965		Spans the Maldonado River near its mouth on the Atlantic Ocean
General Artigas Bridge	Paysandú	1975		Spans the Uruguay River; international bridge uniting with the Argentine town of Colón, Entre Ríos
Libertador General San Martín Bridge	Fray Bentos	1976		Spans the Uruguay River; international bridge uniting with the Argentine town of Puerto Unzué, Entre Ríos
Salto Grande Bridge	Salto	1982		Spans the Uruguay River; international bridge (actually a dam) uniting with the Argentine town of Concordia, Entre Ríos
Laguna Garzon Bridge	Laguna Garzón	2015		Spans the mouths of the Laguna Garzón near the Atlantic Ocean, in the limit between Maldonado and Rocha Departments
