= Stressed ribbon bridge =

Type of bridge

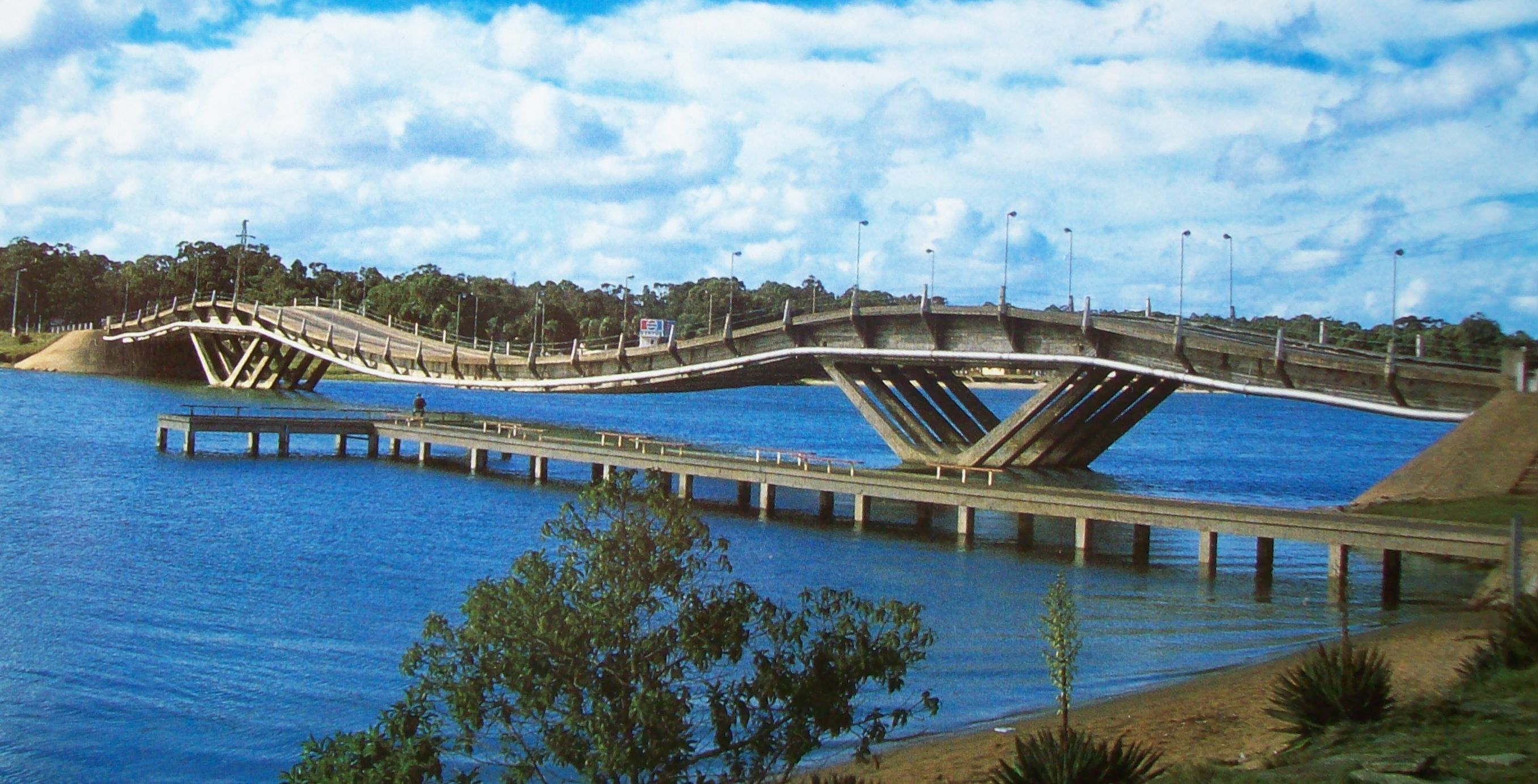
- Leonel Viera Bridge the first stressed ribbon bridge ever built. Punta del Este, Uruguay
- Ancestor: Simple suspension bridge
- Related: Suspension bridge
- Descendant: None
- Carries: Pedestrians, automobiles, trucks
- Span range: Medium
- Material: Steel rope, concrete or treated woods
- Movable: No
- Design effort: Medium
- Falsework required: No

A stressed ribbon bridge (also stress-ribbon bridge or catenary bridge) is a tension structure similar in many ways to a simple suspension bridge. The suspension cables are embedded in the deck, which follows a catenary arc between supports. As with a simple suspension bridge, the weight is taken by the suspension cables, but unlike the simple span, the deck or ribbon is stressed in compression, which adds to the stiffness of the structure (simple suspension spans tend to sway and bounce). The supports in turn sustain upward-thrusting arcs that allow the grade to be changed between spans (where multiple spans are used). Such bridges are typically made from concrete reinforced by steel tensioning cables. Where such bridges carry vehicle traffic, a certain degree of stiffness is required to prevent excessive flexure of the structure, obtained by stressing the concrete in compression.

== Examples ==
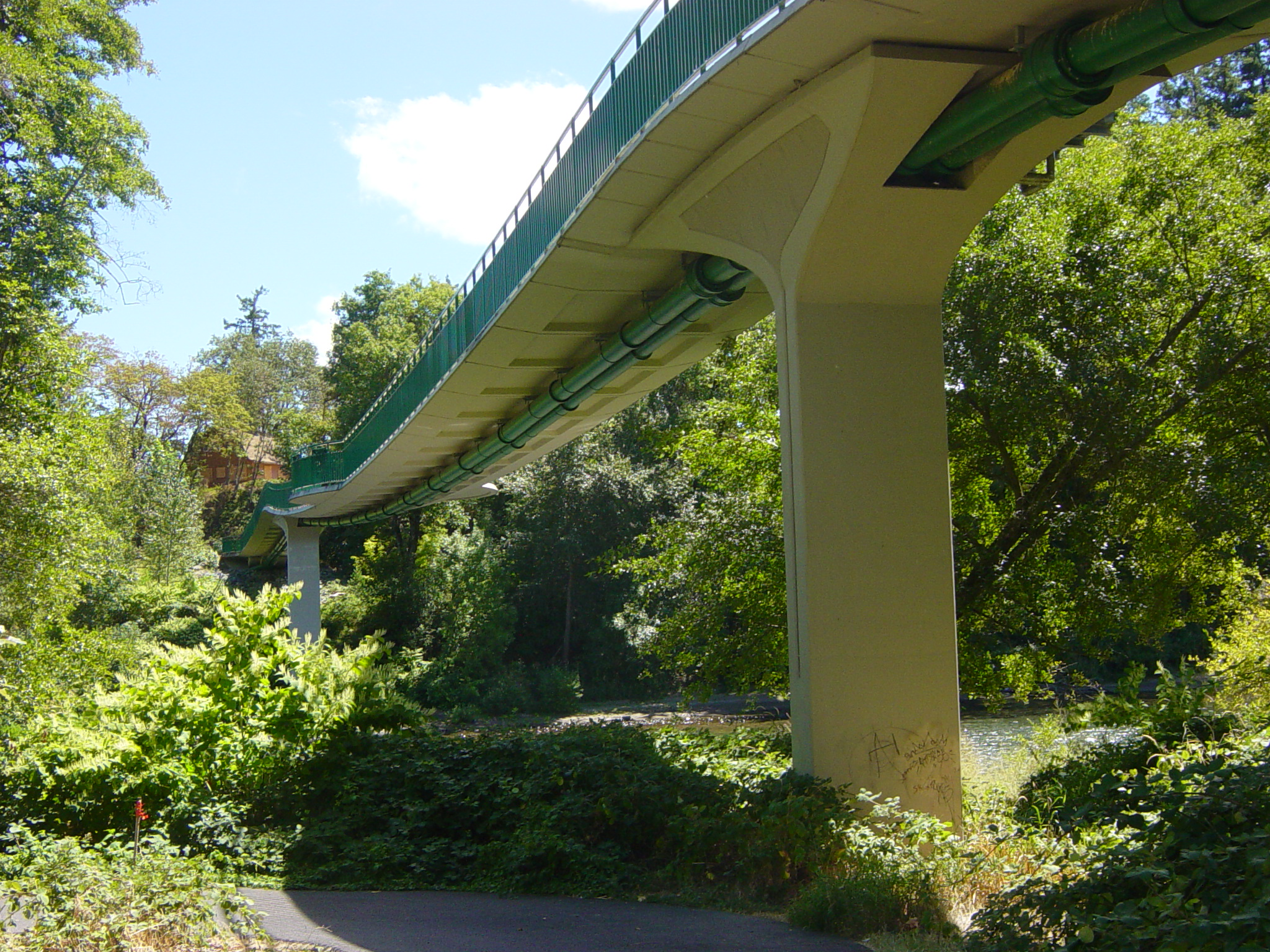
Rogue River Pedestrian Bridge

- Leonel Viera Bridge, Uruguay - the first stressed ribbon bridge ever built. Designed and built by engineer Lionel Viera. Completed in 1965. In 1999 a twin bridge was built 20 meters (65 ft) upstream to accommodate two-way traffic.
- Lake Hodges Pedestrian Bridge, California - the longest stressed ribbon bridge in the world, measuring 303 metres (995 ft).
- Phyllis J. Tilley Memorial Bridge - a hybrid concrete arch/stressed ribbon bridge across the Trinity River in Fort Worth, Texas.
- Rogue River Pedestrian Bridge - a pedestrian-pipeline bridge across the Rogue River at Grants Pass, Oregon.
- Terwillegar Park Footbridge - a stressed ribbon bridge across the North Saskatchewan River in Edmonton, Alberta, that is the second longest in the world, measuring 262 metres (860 ft).
- Langur Way Canopy Walk - located in The Habitat atop Penang Hill in Penang, Malaysia, this is the world’s highest-altitude stressed ribbon bridge (740m above sea level) as well as being the only one in a tropical rainforest.
