= San Dieguito River Park =

Coordinates: 33.0424°N 117.0406°W

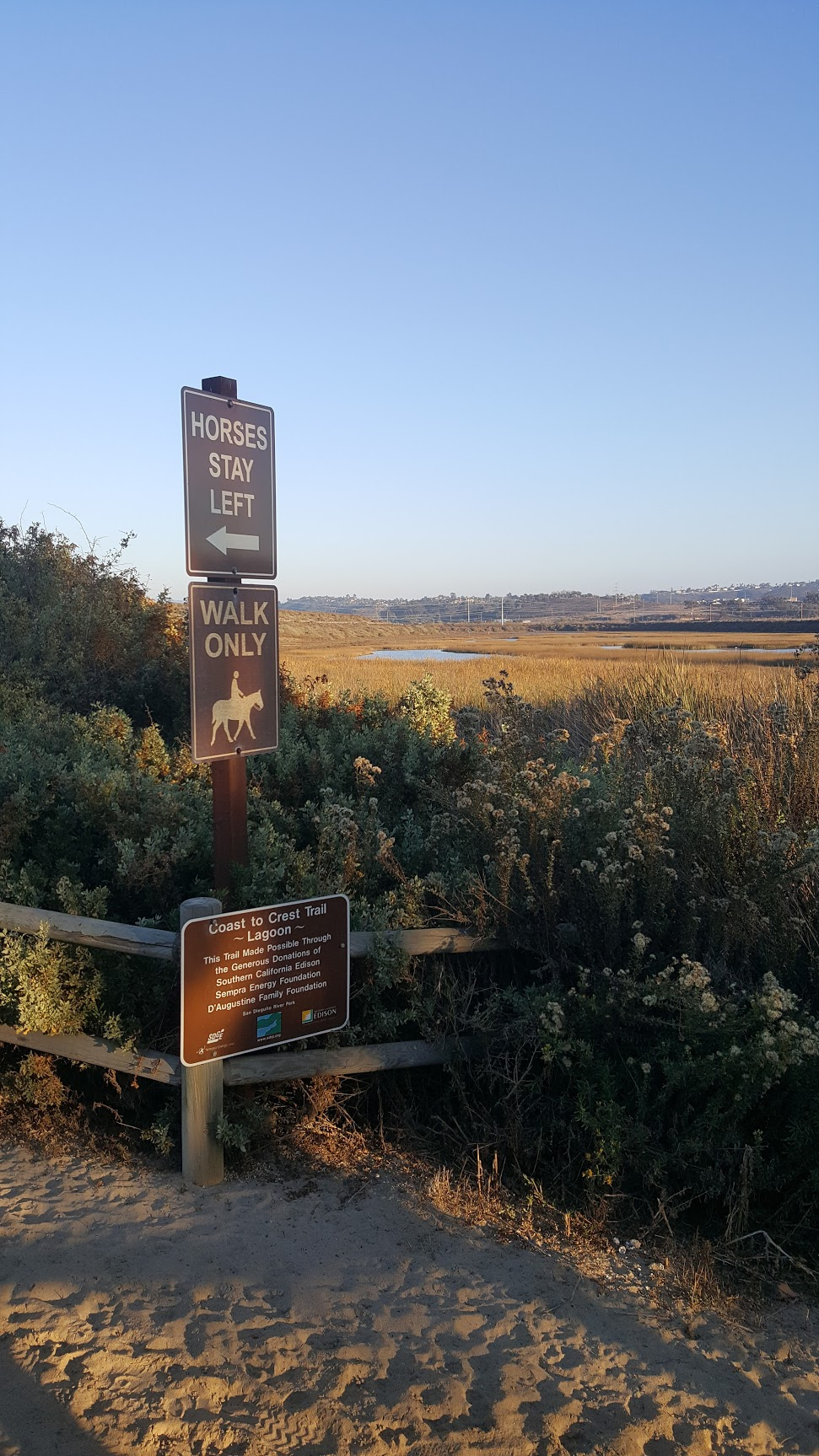
- Coast to Crest trailhead at the San Dieguito lagoon staging area
- Interactive map of San Dieguito River Park
- Type: Greenway
- Area: 92,000-acre (37,000 ha)

The San Dieguito River Park is a 92,000-acre (37,000 ha) greenway in San Diego County, California, United States. The park, established in 1989, stretches for 55 miles (89 km) from the mouth of San Dieguito Lagoon (a lagoon between Solana Beach and Del Mar) to the Volcan Mountain Wilderness Preserve close to Julian, following the San Dieguito River. The park is a joint powers authority comprising San Diego County and the cities of Del Mar, Escondido, Poway, San Diego, and Solana Beach.

The park contains the Coast to Crest Trail with the planned length of 70 miles (110 km). As of 2017, 45 miles (72 km) of the Coast to Crest Trail have been built, as were 20 miles (32 km) of auxiliary trails.

Open space within the park is a home to multiple species, including 230 birds. Coastal sage scrub habitat includes least Bell's vireo, cactus wren, California gnatcatcher and San Diego horned lizard.

A restoration project in the San Dieguito Lagoon was completed in 2011 at the cost of 86 million dollars.
