= Lake Hodges Bridge =

Bridge south of Escondido, California

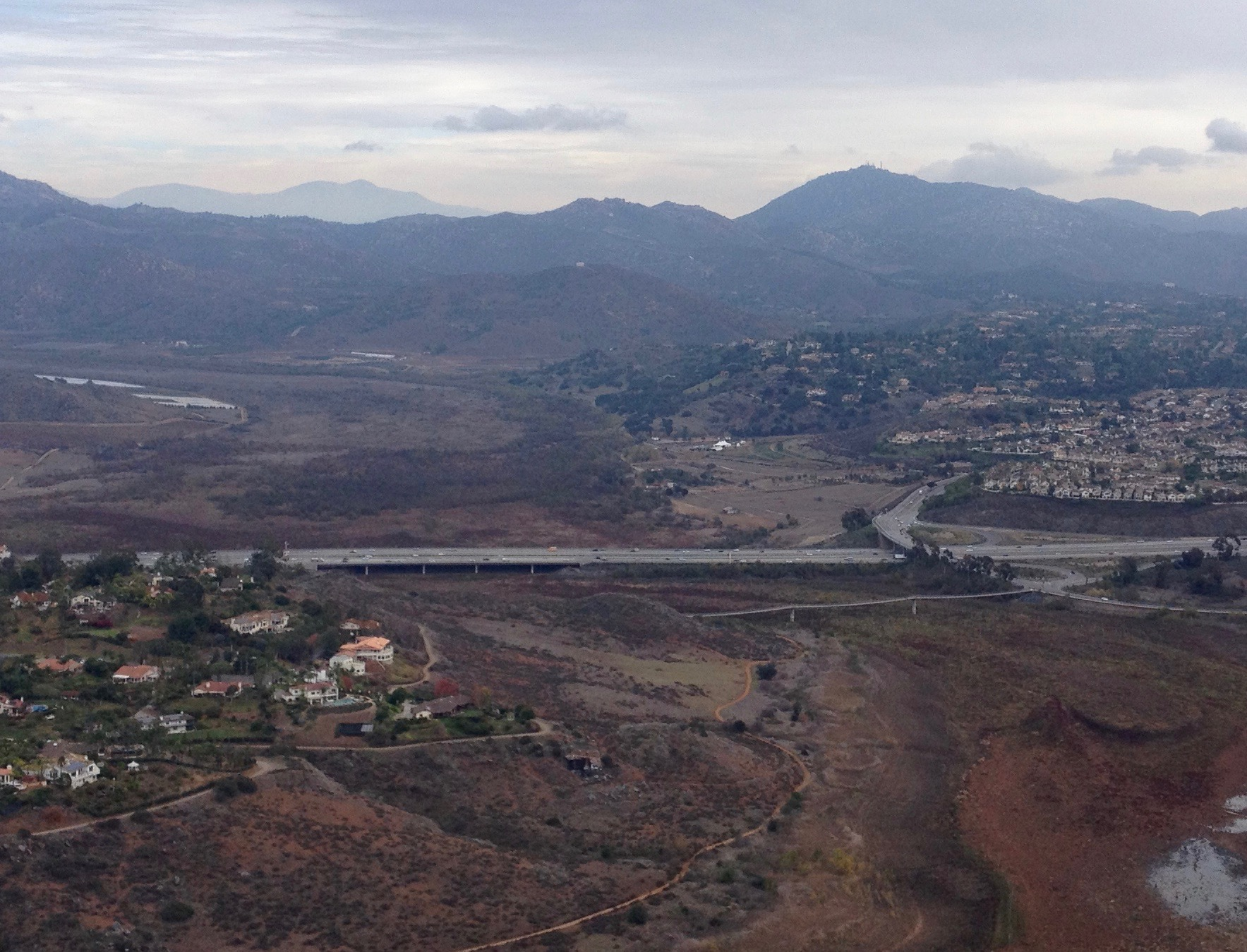
- Lake Hodges Bridge (background) and David Kreitzer Lake Hodges Bicycle Pedestrian Bridge, as seen from Bernardo Mountain, facing east
- Coordinates: 33.059156°N 117.06976°W
- Carries: I-15
- Crosses: Lake Hodges
- Locale: South of Escondido, California
- ID number: 57 1134

Characteristics
- Material: Concrete

History
- Construction end: 1919
- Rebuilt: 1969, 1981

Location
- Interactive map of Lake Hodges Bridge

The Lake Hodges Bridge is a component of Interstate 15 that spans Lake Hodges in San Diego, California, just south of the city limits of Escondido. It is an important part of San Diego's north–south transportation axis. Depending on the amount of rainfall in San Diego County, Lake Hodges's water level fluctuates significantly. As such, the bridge may cross over water or a dry lake bed. Due to the vast amount of vegetation that springs up when water levels are low, the area below the bridge has been jokingly referred to as "Hodges National Forest".

The original bridge was constructed in 1919. It later became integrated into the newly constructed U.S. Route 395. As part of a roadway realignment and improvement project, the original structure was demolished in 1968, and replaced with a new structure in 1969. That bridge was subsequently replaced in 1981, when I-15 was built to supersede US 395. The current bridge is a concrete viaduct. It was widened and replaced in 2006–2009 as part of a project to add managed lanes in the I-15 corridor.

As a traffic bottleneck, the bridge is vulnerable to traffic jams. The nature of the lake and the surrounding land makes the bridge the singular access into the city of San Diego from inland North County. The only two major ways around the bridge are the Del Dios Highway, a two-lane winding road to Interstate 5 via Del Mar, and the 25-mile (40 km) trip through Ramona into Escondido. Although paved access roads through the San Pasqual Valley to the east of Lake Hodges do exist, they are lightly traveled and are not designed to handle heavy traffic. The bridge is thus effectively the only crossing point for drivers on the route.

== Pedestrian bridge ==
The Lake Hodges Pedestrian Bridge, officially named the David Kreitzer Lake Hodges Bicycle Pedestrian Bridge after a retired planning commissioner, is a pedestrian bridge spanning Lake Hodges immediately west of the Interstate 15 span. The bridge was opened to the public on May 15, 2009.

The bridge is of a stress-ribbon design, the longest of its type in the world, and only the sixth to have been built in the US. From end to end the bridge measures 995 feet (303 m). Its design was chosen for having the least impact on environmentally sensitive habitats in the construction area.

== See also ==
- bicycle bridge
