= Danguèrè Wotoro massacre =

2022 killings in Ségou Region, Mali

- Part of the Mali War
- Location: Danguèrè Wotoro, Niono Cercle, Mali
- Date: March 1, 2022–March 2, 2022
- Deaths: 35 killed (per HRW); 35–37 killed (per locals)
- Perpetrators: Malian Army; Wagner Group

On the night between March 1 and March 1, 2022, Malian forces with the aid of Wagner Group killed over three dozen civilians in Danguèrè Wotoro, near Dogofry, Mali.

== Prelude ==
On February 20, Malian forces began a spike in arrests in the Niono Cercle, with witnesses saying those arrested were returning from a fair. Other locals in the towns of Nampala, Akoumbou, Tangabe, and Dianweli stated that the Malian troops in the area had recently been committing executions, lootings, and arrests.

== Massacre ==
Little is known about how the massacre actually played out, because the bodies of civilians were only discovered in the town the following morning. The bodies were discovered piled on top of each other, all bound and tied. All of the victims were men, many of whom had been arrested the previous week, and some were shot while others were burned. The victims were all also Fulani, a nomadic group who the Malian army often attributes to jihadist attacks.

Survivors of Malian-Wagner detainment prior to the massacre stated that they were being held in the Diabaly military camp, and were beaten severely. One survivor said he saw the soldiers remove around 30 men from one cell the night before the massacre.

== Aftermath ==
The Malian government denied any involvement in the massacre, and claimed that mentions of it were "defaming" the government. On March 17, the government banned Radio France Internationale and France 24 for claiming the massacre was perpetrated by the Malian army and Wagner group.

Al-Qaeda-linked Jama'at Nasr al-Islam wal Muslimin claimed responsibility for an attack in Mondoro, stating it was in retribution for the massacre at Danguèrè Wotoro.

Human Rights Watch, MINUSMA, and the locals all accused the Malian Army and Wagner for the attack, with HRW giving a death toll of 35 and RFI claiming 35 to 37 people were killed.
