= 2023 Farabougou attack =

Battle of the Mali War

- Part of Mali War
| Date | December 12, 2023; 2pm-5pm |
| Location | Farabougou, Niono Cercle, Mali 14°47′N 6°14′W |
| Result | Katiba Macina victory |

Belligerents
| Mali; Local dozo hunters | Jama'at Nasr al-Islam wal Muslimin: Katiba Macina |

Casualties and losses
| 30–62 killed 15 injured 2–3 kidnapped | Unknown |
- Unknown number of civilians killed and kidnapped

On December 12, 2023, jihadist militants from Katiba Macina, an affiliate of the al-Qaeda aligned Jama'at Nasr al-Islam wal Muslimin (JNIM), attacked Malian forces in the town of Farabougou. The attack killed dozens of Malian soldiers and was the first major raid in the town by JNIM since the Siege of Farabougou in 2020.

== Background ==
In October 2020, Katiba Macina besieged the village of Farabougou near the town of Sokolo, Ségou Region, Mali, starving thousands of people who lived in the village and cutting off access for weeks. JNIM and local dozo hunters signed a peace treaty in March 2021 after the siege was lifted by Malian troops led by Assimi Goita. In the peace agreement, JNIM would leave the residents of Farabougou alone if the residents paid taxes toward JNIM. This agreement was broken in 2022 when Malian troops settled in the town.

== Attack ==
Between 2 and 3pm on December 12, Katiba Macina fighters raided the town of Farabougou. The Malian detachment present in the town was caught off guard and quickly defeated by the jihadists. Pro-government dozo hunters were then targeted by the jihadists. Katiba Macina militants seized control of the Malian base in the town, who burned the fort to the ground and destroyed any vehicles they couldn't loot.

Most residents fled Farabougou during the fighting. One resident speaking to Reuters stated that the jihadists kidnapped some residents and killed others. Katiba Macina withdrew from the village at 5pm, and Malian military reinforcements from Sokolo arrived later that evening to a deserted village. The Malian military released a statement claiming to have repelled the attack, although witness testimony disproved this.

== Aftermath ==
The Malian military did not report any casualties following the attack. RFI, citing residents, stated fifty people were killed. Twenty soldiers and twenty dozos were killed, and fifteen others were injured. Other residents put the death toll at over sixty people killed including soldiers and civilians. JNIM claimed responsibility for the attack, and they claimed to have killed thirty soldiers and captured three hostages. JNIM later released a photography of a hostage Malian lieutenant and a corporal. In the second statement, JNIM proposed a prisoner exchange with the Malian government.

On 19 August 2025, JNIM launched another assault on the town and the nearby military base. JNIM claimed 21 soldiers were killed and 15 vehicles were seized during the attacks. The military base in Farabogou was confirmed by the military as having been under control of the militants on August 23rd as part of a strategic withdrawal.
