= Siege of Farabougou =

- Part of Mali War
Date	October 6–22, 2020
Location	Farabougou, Niono Cercle, Mali
Result	Malian victory
Territorial changes	Jihadists still hold a large presence around the village

Belligerents
Bambara dozos Mali	Fulani militants associated with Katiba Macina and JNIM

Commanders and leaders
Abdoulaye Coulibaly; Assimi Goita; Didier Dembele	Unknown

Casualties and losses
10+ dozos killed	Unknown
- 10+ civilians killed, 30+ kidnapped 2,000 civilians fled

Between October 6, 2020, and October 22, 2020, Fulani militants from Jama'at Nasr al-Islam wal Muslimin's Katiba Macina laid siege to the town of Farabougou, Ségou Region, Mali. The fighting initially began as an intensification of ethnic conflict between Bambara and Fulani militias, and escalated when Jama'at Nasr al-Islam wal Muslimin surrounded the city. As JNIM tightened the siege on the city, residents faced famine and drought. Mediation committees composed of leaders and elders from nearby villages attempted to negotiate the lifting of the siege, but Malian forces liberated it on October 22. Jihadists still held a large presence near the town for weeks to come.

== Background ==
Jama'at Nasr al-Islam wal Muslimin, a coalition of jihadist groups that merged in 2017, has intensified its operations in central Mali's Mopti and Ségou regions since 2020, with the main local affiliate Katiba Macina often being composed of Fulani youth. These offensives came around a time when Malian forces began arming and aiding Dan Na Ambassagou and other regional militias in these regions to counter the jihadist threat. Because of this, civil conflicts between ethnic groups such as the Bambara and Fulani can often spiral into clashes between pro-Malian government militias or direct involvement of Malian forces versus jihadist or anti-government militias.

Farabougou is located near the Wagadou Forest, a known hideout for JNIM and Katiba Macina. Many attacks carried out on Farabougou and villages around the forest have been claimed by these two groups in the past. The town had a population of 3,000 residents prior to the battle.

== Siege ==
During the weekly market on October 6, armed men likely affiliated with JNIM kidnapped twenty people and killed one young man in Farabougou. At the time of the kidnapping, the civilians were headed to the market in Dogofry. The kidnapping sparked clashes between Bambara hunters and the JNIM fighters, who were Fulani. Nine people, mostly women and children, were released by JNIM later that evening. The bridge between the villages and the towns of Dogofry and Touba Coura was destroyed, effectively leaving Farabougou and Kourouma Koubé encircled.

On October 9, residents from Farabougou went to a small village nearby to search for the remaining hostages. The jihadists began firing at the civilians, leaving six dead on the spot and twenty-two others injured. Meanwhile, clashes reignited on October 9 between Bambara dozo hunters and JNIM outside of Farabougou, killing ten dozos and injuring many more. JNIM overran the group, and kidnapped a further ten civilians. The jihadists then tightened the siege on Farabougou, blocking imports and exports of food, along with slaughtering and capturing 3,000 cattle owned by the villagers. The lack of food led to the deaths of three children in the village by October 12. By that time, despite pleas from villagers for aid by Malian forces in Diabaly, no aid had arrived in the town.

On October 13, at least 2,000 people had fled Farabougou, fleeing to nearby Sokolo. Residents of Sokolo came together to administer aid and housing to the residents, while Malian security forces were not present in the area. A coalition of mayors from surrounding areas, tribal leaders, and religious leaders attempted to mediate with the jihadists to lift the siege, but the convoy was unable to enter the village. Residents remaining in the town were holed up in their homes. One resident in the town, speaking to RFI by phone, stated that he was fearful of stepping outside because jihadists were roaming the streets.

Malian sources on October 16 stated that Farabougou was "deserted", and that while Malian forces had conducted intelligence on the village, the roads were impassable due to the rains and an offensive was impossible. The Malian forces subsequently returned to DIabaly. In Farabougou itself, the local jihadist leaders were themselves running out of food, water, and other supplies. The jihadists also burned granaries in the town, heightening the famine. Protests erupted in Dogofry calling on Malian authorities to act in lifting the siege. On October 19, Malian forces airdropped food and resources to the villagers. However, Malian forces were unable to access the village itself due to jihadists imploding the bridge on October 18, and jihadist groups began embedding themselves in the surrounding villages.

Malian forces and dozos launched another offensive to recapture Farabougou on October 20, bypassing several villages that day. Mediation efforts continued round this time, but with little success. One mediator stated that while the attackers referred to themselves as jihadists, their rationale for the siege was the killing of several Fulani residents by Bambara notables in and around Farabougou in early October. The tipping point for the attacks was the death of a Fulani shepherd in his field in early October. The mediators apologized for the killings, but direct meetings between the coalition and the jihadists had still not happened. Malian forces again airdropped food and supplies on October 20. The food was received by the villagers, but many were just waiting for Malian forces to flush the jihadists out.

On October 21, the Association of Nationals of the Rural Community of Dogofry (ANCRD), consisting of village leaders and elders from Dogofry, Sokolo, and Farabougou, announced their intentions to mobilize residents to liberate Farabougou if Malian forces would not enter the town. The association stated that remaining residents of Farabougou were on the brink of starvation. Malian political figures such as former Prime Minister Moussa Mara and politicians Cheick Oumar Sissoko and Mountaga Tall urged action by Malian forces on the city.

Malian forces were airdropped in Farabougou on October 22, postponing a mediation meeting. The forces were led by vice-president Assimi Goïta and Didier Dembele. The paratroopers were dropped off in the village in several intervals, securing the town and escorting hungry villagers to hospitals. Meanwhile, large numbers of Malian vehicles were present around the village, preparing for a ground assault on the town if mediation failed. A third package of food was airdropped by Malian forces that same day. Farabougou was confirmed to be liberated by Malian forces by the end of October 22. Malian forces took up positions on all corners of the town. MINUSMA logistics also helped Malian forces capture the town.

== Aftermath ==
Despite the Malian liberation of Farabougou, jihadists still had a large presence around the town. One resident stated that he was still worried about the threat of jihadists even after Malian forces were present in the town. On October 22, as Farabougou was being captured by Mali, the nearby village of Kourouma Koubé was attacked by jihadists, leaving one injured. Dozos repelled the attack before Malian forces arrived. One mediator stated that the Malian forces had disrupted a permanent solution to the jihadist threat, as the Malian forces couldn't secure the area forever, highlighting the need for negotiation.

Bamada reported that despite the jihadists fleeing Farabougou, the logistical support they had and the impassable road connecting the town to Dogofry meant that the chance of a second attack was extremely high. Almost all villages in the area have connections with Katiba Macina in the area, and jihadists had already begun threatening residents of Dily with a siege if they celebrated festivals. While no town is explicitly occupied, all of them are threatened. Mediation efforts in the area made dozos lay down their arms in exchange for Fulani militants not attacking their livestock and returning the ones they stole.

Twenty villagers were kidnapped on October 31 between Dogofry and Farabougou, marking the end of the calm imposed by Malian forces in Farabougou. A mediator stated that immediately after dozos laid down their weapons, the Fulani vowed "to pick them up". The imam of the nearby village of N'Debougou was assassinated with his trader on November 2, with both jihadists and dozos blaming one another. Dozos also made Fulani residents in Dogofry get out of their vehicles on November 3, and subsequently executed them. The government of Niono Cercle organized an intercommunity conference in early November to enlarge the discussions from ANCRD. The conference culminated in a non-aggression pact.

Malian forces began decreasing its presence Farabougou in early November, and French forces dropped some food supplies in the village on November 7. The next day, Malian forces and civilians were shot at in two separate incidents near Farabougou. Abdoulaye Coulibaly, head of Farabougou dozos, stated that his village would defend itself if jihadists attacked again. Later, the towns of N'Debougou, Yere Don Samiona, and Toridagako were besieged to a lesser extent by jihadists.
