= Boky Wéré =

- Commune and village
- Location in Mali
- Coordinates: 14°0′38″N 5°36′12″W
- Country: Mali
- Region: Ségou Region
- Cercle: Macina Cercle

Area
  - Total: 220 km^{2} (85 sq mi)

Population (2009 census)
  - Total: 16,934
  - Density: 77/km^{2} (200/sq mi)
- Time zone: UTC+0 (GMT)

Boky Wéré is a village and rural commune in the Cercle of Macina in the Ségou Region of southern-central Mali. The commune covers an area of approximately 220 square kilometers and includes 14 villages. The commune is bordered to the north by the commune of Monimpébougou, to the east by the commune of Kokry, to the west by the commune of Pogo and to the south by the commune of Kolongo. In the 2009 census the commune had a population of 16,934. The village lies to the north of the Fala de Boky-Wéré, an ancient riverbed that forms part of the Office du Niger irrigation system, and to the south of a large irrigation canal dug in 2009 as part of the Libyan financed Malibya project.
