= Molodo =

- Village
- Location in Mali
- Coordinates: 14°14′15″N 6°1′12″W
- Country: Mali
- Region: Ségou Region
- Cercle: Niono Cercle
- Commune: Kala Siguida
- Time zone: UTC+0 (GMT)

Molodo is a village and seat of the commune of Kala Siguida in the Cercle of Niono in the Ségou Region of southern-central Mali. The village was created in 1945 to accommodate labourers working for the Office du Niger irrigation scheme. It lies only 4 km from Niono on opposite side of the Fala de Molodo.
