= Alatona =

- Location in Mali
- Coordinates: 14.8027°N 5.9362°W
- Country: Mali
- Region: Ségou Region
- Cercle: Niono Cercle
- Time zone: UTC+0 (GMT)

Alatona is a locality in the Cercle of Niono in the Ségou Region of southern-central Mali. It encompasses the zone covered by the Alatona Irrigation Project, a part of the Office du Niger scheme. Alatona was originally a small village (former site is at 14.8027°N 5.9362°W) that was abandoned after droughts in the early seventies forced its inhabitants to move closer to the waters of the Fala de Molodo. The population of the former village was 127 in 2007 before the irrigation projects works started, and its old site turned into farmland. The original village was located in the Dogofry commune and is still listed as such by the Malian government, Although the Alatona Irrigation Project extends to the neighboring commune of Diabaly.
