= Saye (disambiguation) =

Saye may refer to:

- Saye, a woollen cloth historically woven in England
- Saye, Mali, a town in Mali
- Saye, Dahanu, a village in Maharashtra, India
- Baron Saye and Sele, British peerage
- Viscount Saye and Sele, British peerage
