= Sokolo attack =

2020 terror attack

- Part of Mali War
Date	January 26, 2020
Location	Sokolo, Mali
Result	JNIM victory

Belligerents
Mali	Jama'at Nasr al-Islam wal Muslimin

Commanders and leaders
Hanoura Sangare †	Unknown

Strength
80	~100

Casualties and losses
20 killed 5 wounded 3 captured (per JNIM)	3 killed (per JNIM); 4 killed (per Mali)
- 53 civilians killed in post-attack killings

On January 26, 2020, jihadists from the al-Qaeda linked Jama'at Nasr al-Islam wal Muslimin (JNIM) attacked a Malian military base at Sokolo, killing over 20 Malian soldiers.

== Attack ==
At around 5 am, around a hundred JNIM fighters stormed the camp at Sokolo, which was being held by about eighty Malian soldiers. JNIM attacked from the north, south, and east, causing many of the stationed soldiers to flee into the town of Sokolo. Fighting ended around 7 am, at which point the jihadists began to destroy nearly everything in the base. The fighters retreated after burning the base to the ground, and around this time Malian reinforcements from Diabaly arrived.

== Casualties and aftermath ==
The Malian government stated on the evening of January 26 that 20 Malian soldiers were killed and five wounded. The government also claimed four jihadists were killed in the attack, although JNIM only alleges three were killed. In a statement, JNIM claimed to have captured 3 Malian soldiers, which could not be independently verified. In the following days, it was reported that the captain at the military base, Harouna Sangare, was killed during the fighting. 60 of the Malian troops, mainly those who fled, survived the attack.

The UN reported that 53 civilians were killed by Malian troops in Sokolo around January 27, sparking a rise in extrajudicial killings by the Malian army.
