= Sarro =

Sarro may refer to:

- Sarro, Mali, a village in Mali
- Sarró, the sack of the Majorcan bagpipe Xeremia
- Sarangani Reconciliation and Reformation Organization (SARRO), a regional political party in the Philippines

== People ==
- Domenico Sarro (1679–1744), Italian composer
- Lina Sarro, Italian electrical engineer
- Fred DeSarro (1937–1978), American racecar driver
- Al Di Sarro (1951–2011), American visual effects artist
- Joseph DiSarro, American professor of political science
- Dimitrios Sarros (1869/70–1937), Greek scholar, teacher, soldier

== See also ==
- Saro (disambiguation)
- Sarroux, a former commune in Corrèze department, France
