= Bougouni, Ségou =

Bougouni
- Village
- Location in Mali
- Coordinates: 14°25′6″N 6°0′10″W
- Country: Mali
- Region: Ségou Region
- Cercle: Niono Cercle
- Commune: Mariko
- Time zone: UTC+0 (GMT)

Bougouni is a village and seat of the commune of Mariko in the Cercle of Niono in the Ségou Region of southern-central Mali. The village lies on the west side of the Fala de Molodo, 19 km north of Niono.
