= Goumakoura ambush =

2016 armed attack in Mali

- Part of Mali War
| Date | 13 October 2016 |
| Location | Goumakoura, Mali |
| Result | Ansar Dine victory |

Belligerents
| Mali | Ansar Dine |

Casualties and losses
| 4 killed 7 injured 2 captured (per Ansar Dine) | 1 killed (per Ansar Dine) |

On 13 October 2016, jihadists from Ansar Dine ambushed Malian soldiers near Goumakoura, Mali.

== Background ==
Prior to the Goumakoura attack, Ansar Dine militants and Fulani nationalists attacked Malian soldiers in the nearby town of Nampalari, Ségou, Mali. Seventeen Malian soldiers were killed in the attack.

== Ambush ==
Soldiers supplying the Nampala garrison from Diabaly were ambushed in the village of Goumakoura. The attack began when two vehicles; a tanker truck and a troop transport vehicle, hit three mines. The attackers, which were referred to as "considerable" in number by the Malian ministry of the interior, fired rockets and automatic weapons at the soldiers. Malian reinforcements were later dispatched to the site to rescue the injured and comb the area.

== Aftermath ==
Four Malian soldiers were killed and seven were injured during the ambush, in an assessment confirmed by the Malian Ministry of Defense. The attack was claimed on 15 October 2016 by Ansar Dine, who claimed to have killed four soldiers, destroyed two vehicles, and captured two Malian soldiers, with one jihadist killed.
