= 2018 Dogofry ambush =

2018 battle of the Mali War

- Part of Mali War
Date	July 31, 2018
Location	Between Dogofry and Nampala, Ségou Region, Mali
Result	Malian victory

Belligerents
Mali	Jama'at Nasr al-Islam wal Muslimin

Casualties and losses
4 killed (per Mali); 6 killed (per Kibaru)	8 killed (per Mali)

On July 31, 2018, jihadists from Jama'at Nasr al-Islam wal Muslimin ambushed a convoy of Malian soldiers transporting electoral votes near Dogofry, Mali.

== Prelude ==
In 2017, five jihadist groups - Ansar Dine, Al-Mourabitoun, Movement for Oneness and Jihad in West Africa, Katibat Macina, and Al-Qaeda in the Islamic Maghreb - that initially rebelled against the Malian government amidst the Tuareg rebellion in 2012, merged to form Jama'at Nasr al-Islam wal Muslimin. JNIM grew in power in late 2017, and soon expanded operations to the northern part of Ségou Region.

== Attack ==
On the evening of July 31, two days after the first round of voting for the 2018 Malian presidential election, a convoy of Malian army vehicles responsible for transporting electoral votes and documents fell into an ambush by JNIM between Dogofry and Nampala. The ambush began with a mine exploding near the convoy, followed by a shootout between the jihadists and Malian forces.

The Malian ministry of defense stated on August 1 that four Malian soldiers were killed in the attack, along with two vehicles missing. They also stated that eight jihadists were killed. Malian media Kibaru stated six Malian soldiers were killed in the attack.
