= Bolibana =

- Village
- Location in Mali
- Coordinates: 14°25′28″N 5°55′41″W
- Country: Mali
- Region: Ségou Region
- Cercle: Niono Cercle
- Commune: Toridaga-Ko
- Time zone: UTC+0 (GMT)

Bolibana is a village and seat of the commune of Toridaga-Ko in the Cercle of Niono in the Ségou Region of southern-central Mali. The village is 20 km north of Niono.
