= 2017 Dogofry ambush =

Jama'at Nasr al-Islam wal Muslimin attack on Malian forces

- Part of Mali War
Date	May 2, 2017
Location	Between Nampalari and Dogofry, Mali
Result	JNIM victory

Belligerents
Mali	Jama'at Nasr al-Islam wal Muslimin

Casualties and losses
9 killed 5 injured	None (per JNIM)

On May 2, 2017, Malian forces were ambushed by Jama'at Nasr al-Islam wal Muslimin fighters near Dogofry, Mali.

== Background ==
Jama'at Nasr al-Islam wal Muslimin (JNIM) was formed in early 2017 as a coalition of five jihadist groups that rebelled against the Malian government in 2012. The attack in Dogofry was the first notable attack of JNIM in western Mali, following earlier attacks in Boulikessi and Gourma-Rharous in the east.

== Ambush ==
The ambush began around 1pm against a Malian convoy travelling between Nampala and Dogofry, Mali. Malian soldiers from the Balazan combined arms group, based in Nara, hit a mine placed by the jihadists on the road, at which point the jihadists opened fire on the convoy. Following the ambush, the jihadists retreated towards the Wagadou forest. The attack was not initially claimed, but suspected to have been perpetrated by JNIM.

== Aftermath ==
AFP initially announced the deaths of eight Malian soldiers and four wounded. On the evening of May 2, Abdel Karim Konate, the Malian Minister of Commerce and a government spokesman, announced that nine soldiers were killed and five were injured. One vehicle was destroyed and another was captured. JNIM claimed responsibility for the attack on May 3, and claimed the deaths and injuries of at least twenty Malian soldiers, while suffering no losses themselves.
