= Toridaga-Ko =

- Commune
- Location in Mali
- Coordinates: 14°25′28″N 5°55′41″W
- Country: Mali
- Region: Ségou Region
- Cercle: Niono Cercle
- Admin centre (chef-lieu): Bolibana

Area
  - Total: 653 km^{2} (252 sq mi)

Population (2009 census)
  - Total: 26,901
  - Density: 41.2/km^{2} (107/sq mi)
- Time zone: UTC+0 (GMT)

Toridaga-Ko is a rural commune in the Cercle of Niono in the Ségou Region of Mali. The commune covers an area of approximately 653 square kilometers and includes 18 villages. In the 2009 census the population was 26,901. The administrative center (chef-lieu) is the village of Bolibana which lies 20 km north of Niono.
