= SAYE =

SAYE may refer to:

- Sharesave, or Save As You Earn, a British savings scheme to encourage employees to buy stakes in the companies for which they work.
- Saye, a woollen cloth woven in the west and south of England in and around the 15th and 16th centuries.
- Saye, Mali
- Baron Saye and Sele, a title in the Peerage of England
