= Macina, Mali =

Macina
- Commune and town
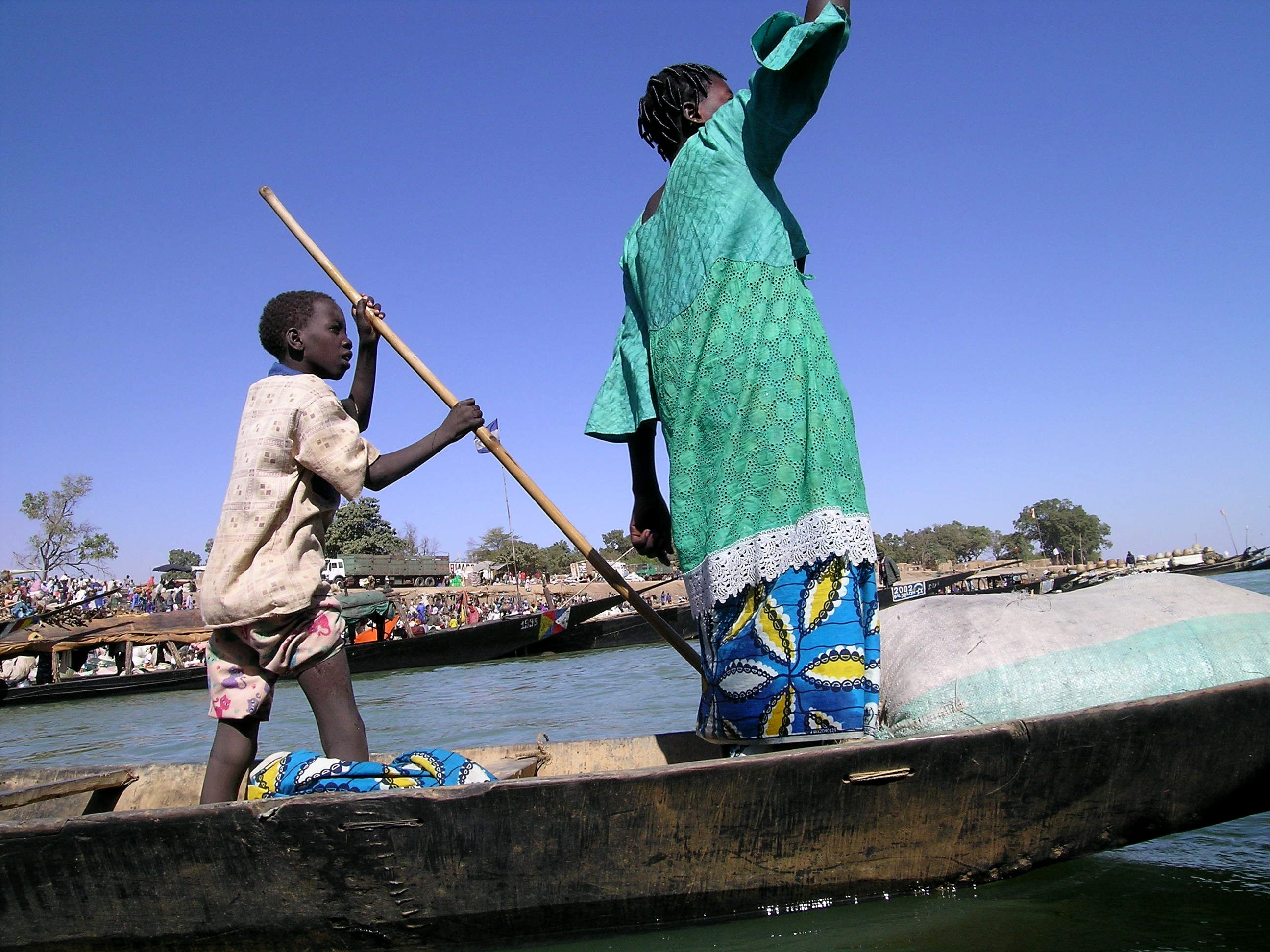

- Location in Mali
- Coordinates: 13°57′40″N 5°21′30″W
- Country: Mali
- Region: Ségou Region
- Cercle: Macina Cercle

Area
  - Total: 1,100 km^{2} (420 sq mi)
- Elevation: 274 m (899 ft)

Population (2009 census)
  - Total: 36,170
  - Density: 33/km^{2} (85/sq mi)
- Time zone: UTC+0 (GMT)

Macina (also Ké Macina and Massina) is a small town and rural commune in the Cercle of Macina in the Ségou Region of southern-central Mali. The commune covers an area of 1,100 square kilometers and contains the main town and 20 villages. In the 2009 census the commune had a population of 36,170.

The town of Macina lies on the north (left) bank of the Niger River. The farmland around the town forms part of the irrigated area of the Office du Niger and is used for growing rice. Water is diverted from the Niger River upstream of the Markala dam and fed into a system of canals.

Ke-Macina was founded in 1921 and named after the Bozo village of Ke across the river, and the Inner Niger Delta region, often called Macina.
