= Matomo =

Matomo may refer to:

- Matomo, Mali, a rural commune
- Matomo (software), a web analytics platform

== See also ==
- Matano or Matana, a lake in Indonesia
- Matoma (Tom Stræte Lagergren, born 1991), Norwegian DJ and record producer
