= N'Debougou =

- Village
- Location in Mali
- Coordinates: 14°22′20″N 5°58′49″W
- Country: Mali
- Region: Ségou Region
- Cercle: Niono Cercle
- Commune: Sirifila-Boundy
- Time zone: UTC+0 (GMT)

N'Debougou is a village and seat of the commune of Sirifila-Boundy in the Cercle of Niono in the Ségou Region of southern-central Mali.
