= Werekela =

- Village
- Location in Mali
- Coordinates: 14°19′51″N 5°56′47″W
- Country: Mali
- Region: Ségou Region
- Cercle: Niono Cercle
- Commune: Yeredon Saniona
- Time zone: UTC+0 (GMT)

Werekela is a village and seat of the commune of Yeredon Saniona in the Cercle of Niono in the Ségou Region of southern-central Mali.
