= Soumouni skirmish =

- Part of Mali War
Date	July 22, 2018
Location	Soumouni forest, Ségou Region, Mali
Result	Malian victory

Belligerents
Mali	Katibat Macina

Commanders and leaders
Issa Pangassi Sangaré †	Unknown

Casualties and losses
1 killed 4 injured	11 killed

The Soumouni skirmish was a short battle that took place on July 22, 2018, between the al-Qaeda aligned Jama'at Nasr al-Islam wal Muslimin and the Malian Army.

== Background ==
Katibat Macina is the local branch for Macina Cercle of Jama'at Nasr al-Islam wal Muslimin, a coalition of five jihadist groups formed in 2017 that originally rebelled against the Malian government in 2012. The group expanded its influence in late 2017 and early 2018 following the creation of JNIM.

== Skirmish ==
Around 8am on July 22, a Malian army patrol fell into an ambush set up by the jihadists in the Soumouni forest, near the town of Séné Bamanan in the Macina cercle. However, Malian forces were able to repel the jihadists.

The Malian army stated in a press release that one soldier was killed in the skirmish, along with four others injured. Eleven jihadists were killed in the attack. The Malian soldier killed was Lieutenant Issa Pangassi Sangaré, who commanded the patrol.
