= Bouka Weré ambush =

- Part of Mali War
Date	June 14, 2020
Location	Bouka Weré, Mali
Result	JNIM victory

Belligerents
Mali	Jama'at Nasr al-Islam wal Muslimin

Strength
64+ soldiers 16 vehicles	Unknown

Casualties and losses
27 killed 13 vehicles	None

On June 14, 2020, dozens of Malian soldiers were killed in an ambush perpetrated by the al-Qaeda linked group Jama'at Nasr al-Islam wal Muslimin (JNIM). The attack was one of the deadliest incidents in recent Malian history, and served as a precursor to the 2020 Malian coup d'état.

== Ambush ==
Two UN peacekeepers were killed on June 13, the day before the attack, near Gao, heightening possibilities of further jihadist attacks. On June 14, a convoy of sixteen vehicles containing 64 Malian soldiers set out from Diabaly, but were ambushed at Bouka Weré. Only twelve soldiers with three vehicles managed to return to the nearest Malian base, located in Goumakoura. One of the vehicles was abandoned after getting stuck trying to return to Goumakoura.

== Casualties and aftermath ==
Initially, the Malian government stated that twenty-four soldiers were killed and eight survivors were recovered. Military officials in the area believed up to forty soldiers were killed at first, but later estimates showed twenty-seven were killed and five soldiers were missing. There is no information regarding the losses or personnel of the JNIM militants.

Protest leaders against Malian president IBK called for further protests and larger turnouts in the wake of the attack.
