= Siribala =

- Commune and town
- Location in Mali
- Coordinates: 14°2′31″N 6°3′42″W
- Country: Mali
- Region: Ségou Region
- Cercle: Niono Cercle

Area
  - Total: 445 km^{2} (172 sq mi)

Population (2009 census)
  - Total: 37,065
  - Density: 83.3/km^{2} (216/sq mi)
- Time zone: UTC+0 (GMT)
  - Summer (DST): UTC14 2 31, -6 3 42

Siribala is a town and rural commune in the Cercle of Niona in the Ségou Region of southern-central Mali. The commune has an area of approximately 445 square kilometers and includes the town and 18 villages, and in the 2009 census, it had a population of 37,065. The town lies 25 km south of Niono on the east side of the Fala de Molodo channel that forms part of the Office du Niger irrigation scheme. The present town, actually Siribala Coura (New Siribala), was established in the 1970s to accommodate agricultural workers employed on the sugar-cane plantation and the associated mill. The earlier settlement, Siribala Coro (Old Siribala), is 5 km away from the present town.
