= Kala Siguida =

- Commune
- Location in Mali
- Coordinates: 14°14′15″N 6°1′12″W
- Country: Mali
- Region: Ségou Region
- Cercle: Niono Cercle
- Admin centre (chef-lieu): Molodo

Area
  - Total: 377 km^{2} (146 sq mi)

Population (2009 census)
  - Total: 20,335
  - Density: 53.9/km^{2} (140/sq mi)
- Time zone: UTC+0 (GMT)

Kala Siguida is a rural commune in the Cercle of Niono in the Ségou Region of Mali. The commune covers an area of approximately 377 square kilometers and includes 15 villages. In the 2009 census it had a population of 20,335. The seat of the local administration is the village of Molodo.
