= Markala =

- Commune
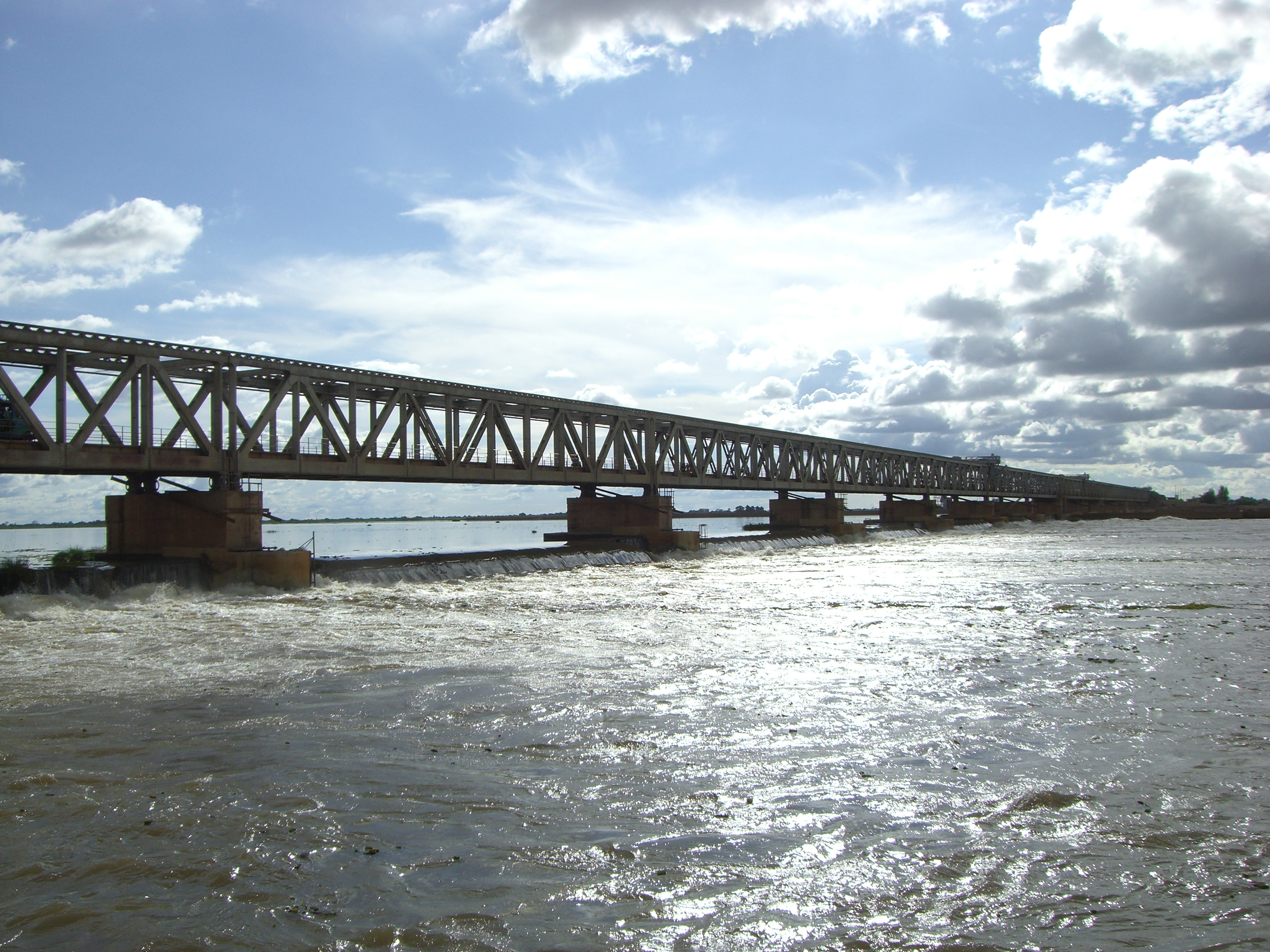
- The Markala dam

- Location in Mali
- Coordinates: 13°40′26″N 6°4′30″W
- Country: Mali
- Region: Ségou Region
- Cercle: Ségou Cercle

Area
  - Total: 318 km^{2} (123 sq mi)
- Elevation: 283 m (928 ft)

Population (2009 census)
  - Total: 45,961
  - Density: 145/km^{2} (374/sq mi)
- Time zone: UTC+0 (GMT)

Markala is a commune in Mali's Ségou Region on the Niger River 35 km down stream from the town of Ségou. The commune contains 30 villages in an area of 318 square kilometers and in 2009 had a population of 45,961. Mali's primary irrigation dam, the Markala dam, lies in the commune. The main village of the commune, Diamarabougou, is on the right bank adjacent to the dam which also serves as an important road bridge.

The French colonial authorities constructed the dam between 1934 and 1945 to irrigate farmland with the intention of producing cotton for the textile industry. The dam is 2450 m in length and functions as a weir in that water can flow over the top. It diverts water into a canal system that extends 135 km to the north past the small towns of Niono and Sokolo in the 'Delta Mort' region. Each year around 2.7 km^{3} of water is diverted from the river, which corresponds to 8.3 percent of the total flow. The water is used to irrigate about 750 square kilometers (75,000 ha) of farmland. The scheme is managed by the Office du Niger and in 1999/2000 produced 320,000 tons of rice, representing 40 percent of the total Malian production.

Although the dam itself lies in the centre of the Markala commune, the farmland irrigated by the dam lies outside the commune to the north.

Until around 2008, the town was served by Markala Airport.
