= 2022 Mondoro attack =

Battle of the Mali War

Mondoro attack
- Part of the Mali War
Date	4 March 2022
Location	Mondoro, Mali
Result	JNIM victory: JNIM successfully ambushes Malian forces; Malian army retakes base later in the day

Belligerents
Malian Armed Forces	Jama'at Nasr al-Islam wal Muslimin

Strength
150	Several hundred

Casualties and losses
27 killed, 33 wounded, 7 missing (per Malian gov.); 40–50+ (per French press); 30 killed (per JNIM)	47 killed (per Mali); 4 killed (per JNIM)

The Mondoro attack took place on 4 March 2022, when al-Qaeda-linked jihadists attacked a Malian military base, causing heavy casualties.

== Background ==
Throughout the war in Mali, Mondoro has been the site of numerous clashes between the Malian army and allies and al-Qaeda and allies.

The Malian army base in Mondoro was attacked simultaneously with the base in Boulikessi in 2019, killing 45 to 85 Malian soldiers. A second attack was repelled in 2021.

== Attack ==
The camp at Mondoro is usually staffed with 150 soldiers. The attack began at 6am local time and was carried out by several hundred jihadists, attacking from the north and east. The jihadists used vehicle-based bombs, which the Malian army countered with planes.

Malian forces did not request help from French Barkhane troops, due to the presence of Wagner Group in the area. Later in the day, Malian troops managed to recapture the base and assess casualties.

== Losses and aftermath ==
Later in the day, the Malian government announced they had lost 27 soldiers, with 33 injured. Seven soldiers were also reported missing. Due to the attack, Mali announced three days of mourning. The Malian government also claimed that 47 Jama'at Nasr al-Islam wal Muslimin (JNIM) fighters were killed.

AFP, citing an anonymous French military source, stated the Malian death toll was between 40-50, and multiple vehicles were seized. France 24 corroborated these claims, stating 47 Malian soldiers died.

JNIM claimed responsibility for the attack on March 8, claiming to have lost only four fighters and killing 30 Malian soldiers. A JNIM spokesman also claimed the Mondoro attack was perpetrated in response to massacres in Dogofry committed by the Malian army earlier that year.
