= Saloba =

- Commune
- Location in Mali
- Coordinates: 13°43′25″N 5°14′20″W
- Country: Mali
- Region: Ségou Region
- Cercle: Macina Cercle

Area
  - Total: 647 km^{2} (250 sq mi)
- Elevation: 273 m (896 ft)

Population (2009 census)
  - Total: 35,328
  - Density: 54.6/km^{2} (141/sq mi)
- Time zone: UTC+0 (GMT)

Saloba is a commune in the Cercle of Macina in the Ségou Region of Mali. The commune covers an area of about 647 square kilometers and contains 42 villages. In then 2009 census the commune had a population of 35,328. The administrative center of the commune is the village of Sarro.
