= Souleye =

- Commune and village
- Location in Mali
- Coordinates: 13°52′40″N 5°14′33″W
- Country: Mali
- Region: Ségou Region
- Cercle: Macina Cercle

Area
  - Total: 388 km^{2} (150 sq mi)
- Elevation: 272 m (892 ft)

Population (2009 census)
  - Total: 9,885
- Time zone: UTC+0 (GMT)

Souleye is a village and rural commune in the Cercle of Macina in the Ségou Region of southern-central Mali. The commune covers an area of approximately 388 square kilometers and includes 10 villages. In the 2009 census the commune had a population of 9,885.
