= Mariko, Mali =

Mariko
- Commune
- Location in Mali
- Coordinates: 14°25′6″N 6°0′10″W
- Country: Mali
- Region: Ségou Region
- Cercle: Niono Cercle

Area
  - Total: 395 km^{2} (153 sq mi)

Population (2009 census)
  - Total: 16,986
  - Density: 43.0/km^{2} (111/sq mi)
- Time zone: UTC+0 (GMT)

Mariko is a commune in the Cercle of Niono in the Ségou Region of Mali. The commune covers an area of approximately 395 square kilometers and includes 21 villages. In the 2009 census the population was 16,986. The seat of local government is the village of Bouguni.
