= Diamarabougou =

- Village
- Location in Mali
- Coordinates: 13°40′26″N 6°4′30″W
- Country: Mali
- Region: Ségou Region
- Cercle: Ségou Cercle
- Commune: Markala
- Time zone: UTC+0 (GMT)

Diamarabougou is a village and seat of the commune of Markala in the Ségou Cercle in the Ségou Region of southern-central Mali. The village is on the right bank of the Niger River at the Markala dam which also serves as a road bridge across the river.
