= Markala Airport =

Airport in Mali

Coordinates: 13.695595°N 6.065330°W

Markala Airport Aéroport Markala
- IATA: none; ICAO: GAMA

Summary
- Serves: Markala
- Location: Mali
- Interactive map of Markala Airport

Markala Airport (ICAO: GAMA) (French: Aéroport Markala) was an airport serving Markala in Mali. It lay north of the city center and can be seen on old maps and satellite imagery. As of 2021, the location has been covered with houses and yards and no trace of the former airport remains.
