= Kokry =

- Commune and village
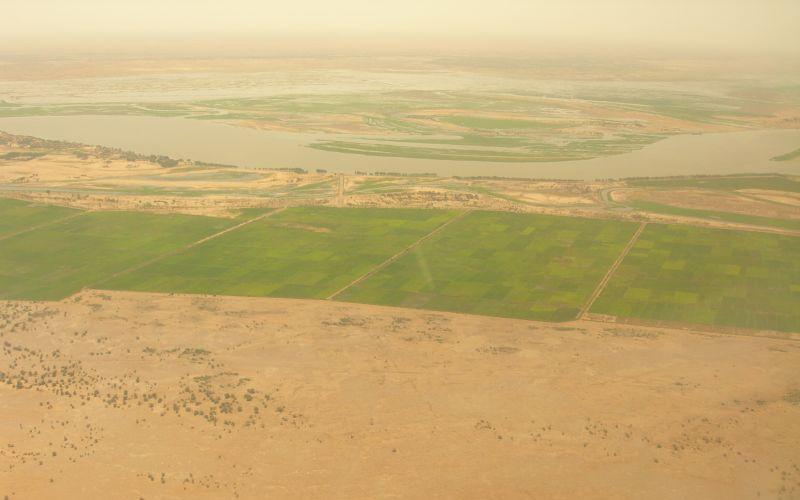
- Farmland in the river area

- Location in Mali
- Coordinates: 13°57′38″N 5°30′55″W
- Country: Mali
- Region: Ségou Region
- Cercle: Macina Cercle

Area
  - Total: 160 km^{2} (62 sq mi)

Population (2009 census)
  - Total: 13,393
  - Density: 84/km^{2} (220/sq mi)
- Time zone: UTC+0 (GMT)

Kokry, also spelled Kokri, is a village and rural commune in the Cercle of Macina in the Ségou Region of southern-central Mali. The commune covers an area of approximately 160 square kilometers and includes 17 villages. The farmland is irrigated by the Office du Niger irrigation scheme. The main crop is rice. In the 2009 census the commune had a population of 13,393. The main village, (chef-lieu), is called Kokry Centre to distinguish it from Kokry Bozo which lies 3 km to the east on a strip of land between the Niger River and the Distributeur Kokry, an irrigation canal.

== History ==
Kokry was an important political center under the Mali Empire and Songhai Empires, seat of the Cha'a (governor) of the province of Kala. It was also the seat of a Traoré kingdom, one of twelve that divided the province.
