= Yeredon Saniona =

- Commune
- Location in Mali
- Coordinates: 14°19′51″N 5°56′47″W
- Country: Mali
- Region: Ségou Region
- Cercle: Niono Cercle
- Admin centre (chef-lieu): Werekela

Area
  - Total: 307 km^{2} (119 sq mi)

Population (2009 census)
  - Total: 17,291
  - Density: 56.3/km^{2} (146/sq mi)
- Time zone: UTC+0 (GMT)

Yeredon Saniona is a commune in the Cercle of Niono in the Ségou Region of Mali. The commune covers an area of approximately 307 square kilometers and includes 15 villages. In the 2009 census it had a population of 17,291. The center of local government (chef-lieu) is the village of Werekela.
