= Sirifila-Boundy =

- Commune
- Location in Mali
- Coordinates: 14°22′20″N 5°58′49″W
- Country: Mali
- Region: Ségou Region
- Cercle: Niono Cercle

Area
  - Total: 159 km^{2} (61 sq mi)

Population (2009 census)
  - Total: 35,290
  - Density: 222/km^{2} (575/sq mi)
- Time zone: UTC+0 (GMT)

Sirifila-Boundy is a rural commune in the Cercle of Niono in the Ségou Region of Mali. It covers an area of approximately 159 square kilometers and includes 16 villages. In the 2009 census it had a population of 35,290. The seat of local government is the village of N'Debougou.
