= Saro =

Saro may refer to:

== Places ==
- Saro, Cantabria, a municipality in Spain
- Särö, a locality situated in Halland County, Sweden
- Saro, Mali, a village in the Ségou Region of Mali
- Saro, the ancient name for the Korean kingdom of Silla and its capital city, Gyeongju

== Others ==
- Saro, a diminutive of Rosario, a male given name in Italian
- Saro people, freed slaves who migrated to Nigeria in the beginning of the 1830s
- Sir Abdool Raman Osman State College, a secondary school in Phoenix, Mauritius
- Saunders-Roe (SARO), a former British aero- and marine-engineering company
- Servicios Aéreos Rutas Oriente, a defunct Mexican low-cost airline
