= Tongué, Mali =

Tongué
- Commune and village
- Location in Mali
- Coordinates: 13°35′43″N 5°16′37″W
- Country: Mali
- Region: Ségou Region
- Cercle: Macina Cercle

Area
  - Total: 129 km^{2} (50 sq mi)

Population (2009 census)
  - Total: 5,584
  - Density: 43.3/km^{2} (112/sq mi)
- Time zone: UTC+0 (GMT)

Tongué is a village and rural commune in the Cercle of Macina in the Ségou Region of southern-central Mali. The commune covers an area of approximately 129 square kilometers and includes 10 villages. In the 2009 census the commune had a population of 5,584.

Abderrahmane al-Sadi, author of the Tarikh al-Sudan, passed through the town in 1644. At the time it was on the border between two petty kingdoms, Shyeladugu and Kamyandugu.
