= Sana, Mali =

Sana
- Commune
- Location in Mali
- Coordinates: 13°49′43″N 4°59′35″W
- Country: Mali
- Region: Ségou Region
- Cercle: Macina Cercle

Area
  - Total: 500 km^{2} (190 sq mi)

Population (2009 census)
  - Total: 28,356
- Time zone: UTC+0 (GMT)

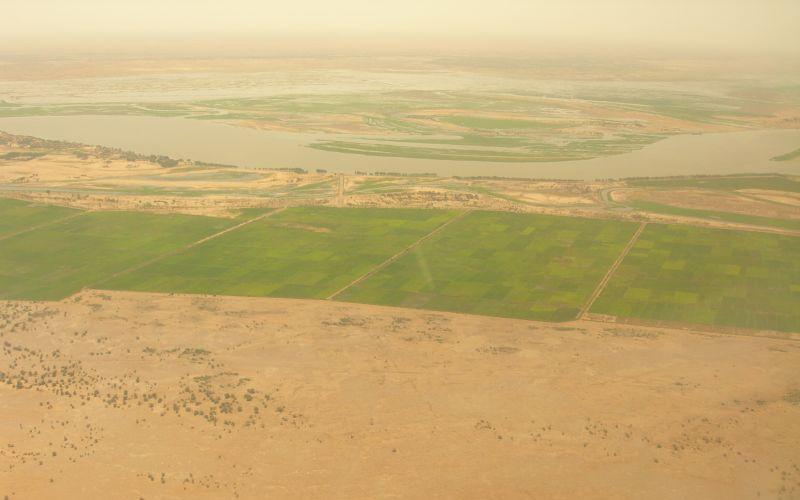
An aerial photo of the region

Sana is a rural commune in the Cercle of Macina in the Ségou Region of Mali. The commune covers an area of about 500 square kilometers and includes 27 villages. In the 2009 census the commune had a population of 28,356. The administrative center of the commune is the village of Saye.
