= Great Mosque of Niono =

Mosque in Niono, Ségou, Mali

- Grande Mosquée du Vendredi de Niono

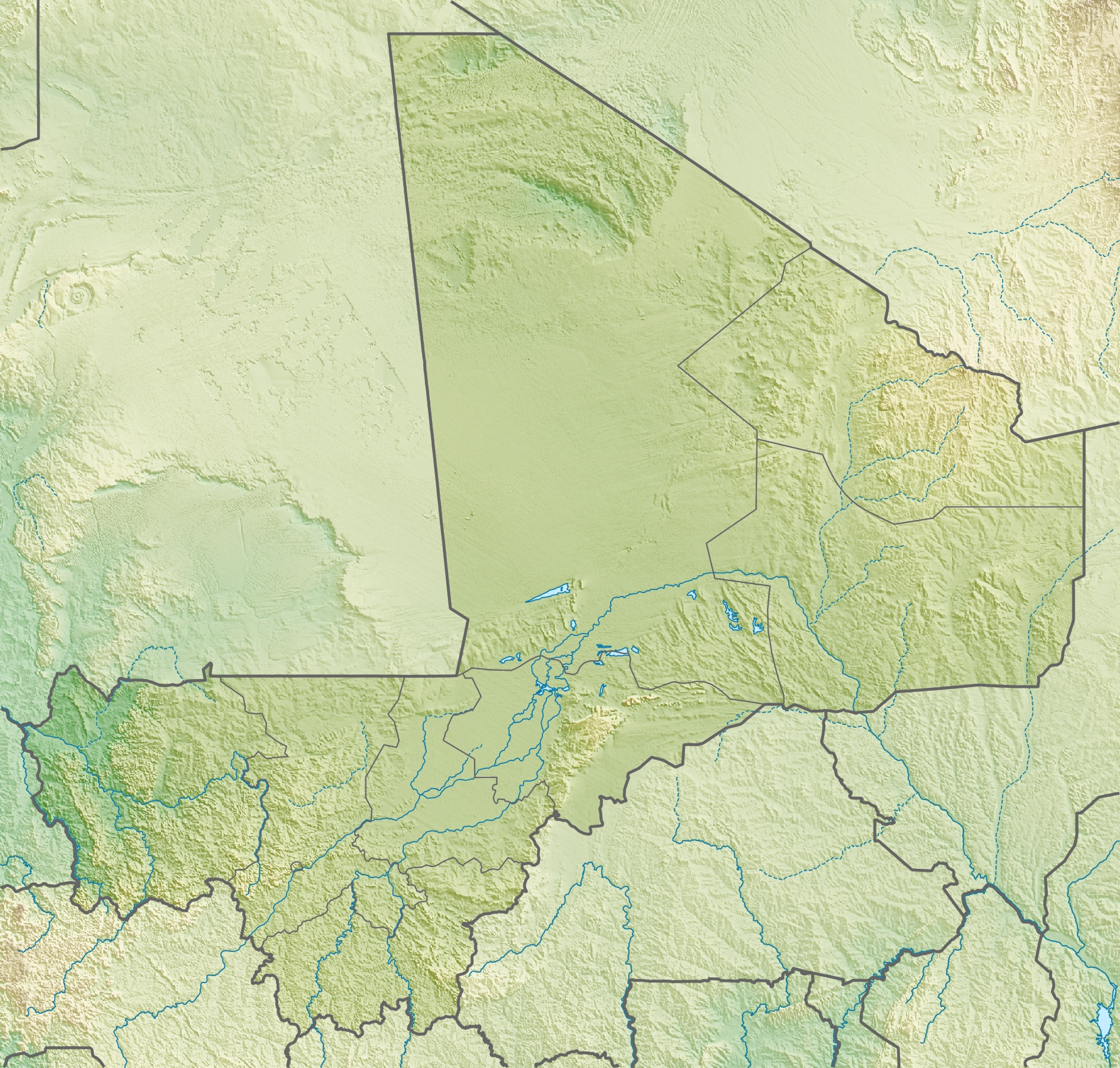
- Location within Mali

Religion
- Affiliation: Islam

Location
- Location: Niono, Ségou, Mali
- Interactive map of Great Mosque of Niono
- Coordinates: 14°15′4.4″N 5°58′55.8″W

Architecture
- Type: mosque
- Established: 1948
- Completed: 1973
- Site area: 1,800 m^{2}

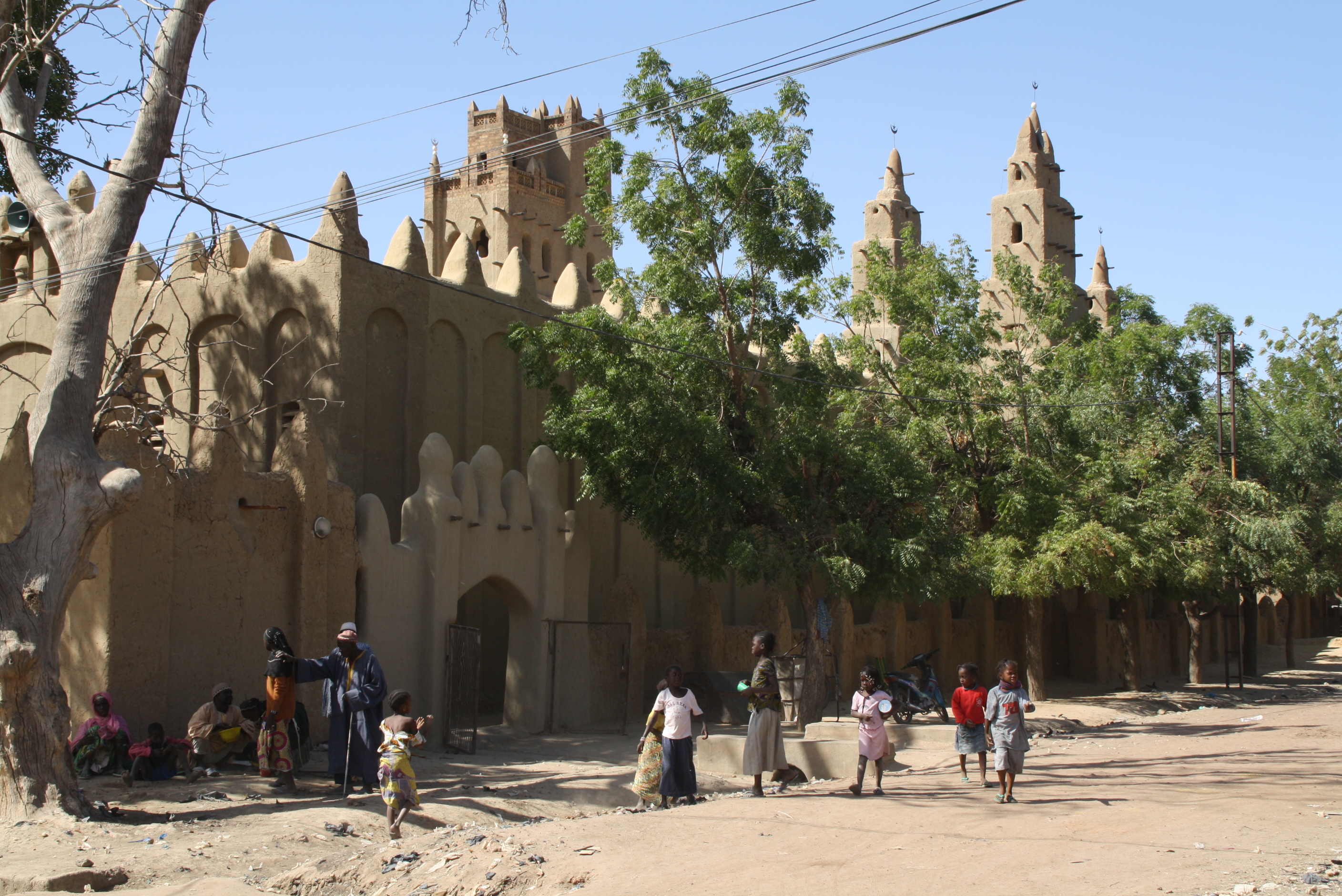
Great Mosque of Niono

The Great Mosque of Niono (French: Grande Mosquée du Vendredi de Niono) is an architecturally significant mosque located in the city of Niono, in the Ségou Region of southern Mali. It is a Sudano-Sahelian architectural style building made mostly of mud brick, palm tree wood, and clay mortar.

== Site description ==
The mosque was first constructed in 1948 by a team of bricklayers native to Djenne led by Lassiné Minta. To accommodate the growing population of Niono, it was given a few major expansions, the last of which was completed in 1973. Today, it occupies 1,800 square meters and includes a main room that spans 658 square meters and a women's prayer hall that spans two floors. It has a main minaret by the west entrance and three additional minarets on the east end along the qibla wall. The mosque has a hypostyle design with a total 68 pillars on the inside.

It is perhaps the most internationally recognized site in the town of Niono, having received the Aga Khan Award for Architecture in 1983.

== World Heritage Status ==
This site was added to the UNESCO World Heritage Tentative List on March 19, 2009 in the Cultural category.
