= Folomana =

- Commune and village
- Location in Mali
- Coordinates: 13°36′10″N 5°9′15″W
- Country: Mali
- Region: Ségou Region
- Cercle: Macina Cercle

Area
  - Total: 146 km^{2} (56 sq mi)

Population (2009 census)
  - Total: 10,478
  - Density: 71.8/km^{2} (186/sq mi)
- Time zone: UTC+0 (GMT)

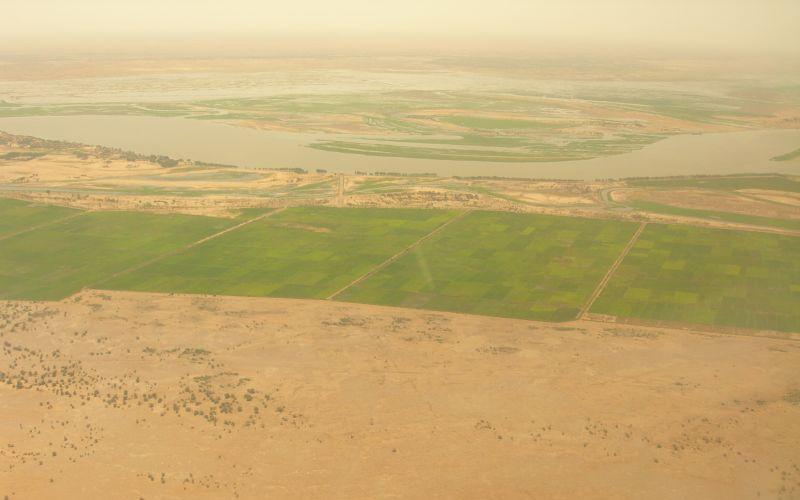

Folomana is a village and rural commune in the Cercle of Macina in the Ségou Region of southern-central Mali. The commune covers an area of approximately 146 square kilometers and includes 17 villages. In the 2009 census the commune had a population of 10,478.
