= Saye, Dahanu =

Village in Maharashtra

Saye
- village
- Location in Maharashtra, India Saye (India)
- Coordinates: 19.8577801°N 72.8663173°E
- Country: India
- State: Maharashtra
- District: Palghar
- Taluka: Dahanu
- Elevation: 39 m (128 ft)

Population (2011)
  - Total: 999
- Time zone: UTC+5:30 (IST)
- 2011 census code: 551703

Saye is a village in the Palghar district of Maharashtra, India. It is located in the Dahanu taluka.

== Demographics ==
According to the 2011 census of India, Saye has 209 households. The effective literacy rate (i.e. the literacy rate of population excluding children aged 6 and below) is 42.01%.

Demographics (2011 Census)
	Total	Male	Female
Population	999	471	528
Children aged below 6 years	185	89	96
Scheduled caste	0	0	0
Scheduled tribe	992	468	524
Literates	342	224	118
Workers (all)	611	288	323
Main workers (total)	475	237	238
Main workers: Cultivators	334	157	177
Main workers: Agricultural labourers	28	17	11
Main workers: Household industry workers	40	25	15
Main workers: Other	73	38	35
Marginal workers (total)	136	51	85
Marginal workers: Cultivators	97	37	60
Marginal workers: Agricultural labourers	14	5	9
Marginal workers: Household industry workers	2	1	1
Marginal workers: Others	23	8	15
Non-workers	388	183	205
