= Pogo, Mali =

Pogo
- Commune and village
- Location in Mali
- Coordinates: 13°53′59″N 5°54′35″W
- Country: Mali
- Region: Ségou Region
- Cercle: Niono Cercle

Area
  - Total: 555 km^{2} (214 sq mi)

Population (2009 census)
  - Total: 16,308
  - Density: 29.4/km^{2} (76.1/sq mi)
- Time zone: UTC+0 (GMT)

Pogo is a village and rural commune in the Cercle of Niono in the Ségou Region of Mali. The commune has an area of approximately 550 square kilometers and includes 18 villages. In the 2009 census it had a population of 16,308.
