= Saye, Mali =

Saye
- Village
- Location in Mali
- Coordinates: 13°49′43″N 4°59′43″W
- Country: Mali
- Region: Ségou Region
- Cercle: Macina Cercle
- Commune: Sana
- Time zone: UTC+0 (GMT)

Saye is a village and seat of the commune of Sana in the Cercle of Macina in the Ségou Region of southern-central Mali.

Saye was besieged and conquered by the faama of Segou in around 1782.
