= Kolongo =

- Commune and village
- Location in Mali
- Coordinates: 13°52′50″N 5°41′10″W
- Country: Mali
- Region: Ségou Region
- Cercle: Macina Cercle

Area
  - Total: 484 km^{2} (187 sq mi)
- Elevation: 277 m (909 ft)

Population (2009 census)
  - Total: 37,648
  - Density: 77.8/km^{2} (201/sq mi)
- Time zone: UTC+0 (GMT)

Kolongo or Kolongo Tomo is a village and rural commune in the Cercle of Macina in the Ségou Region of southern-central Mali. The commune covers an area of approximately 484 square kilometers and includes 37 villages. In the 2009 census the commune had a population of 37,648. The village lies on the Fala de Boky-Wéré, an ancient branch of the Niger River that now forms part of the irrigation system of the Office du Niger.
