= Sarro, Mali =

Sarro
- Village
- Location in Mali
- Coordinates: 13°43′25″N 5°14′20″W
- Country: Mali
- Region: Ségou Region
- Cercle: Macina Cercle
- Commune: Soloba

Population
  - Ethnicities: Bambara people
- Time zone: UTC+0 (GMT)

Sarro (or Saro) is a village and seat of the commune of Saloba in the Cercle of Macina in the Ségou Region of southern-central Mali.

The town was founded by a marabout from the Manding region who had trained at Dia. He made a name for himself, and entered the service of Ngolo Diarra, faama of the Segou Empire in the 1760s. He was given land on the empire's eastern frontier, and Sarro became an important military garrison defending the state against the Massina Empire. This position in between powers allowed the ruling Traore family, after Segou's fall to El Hajj Umar Tall, to craft an independent statelet for themselves, precursor to the colonial-era canton.
