= Matomo, Mali =

Matomo
- Commune
- Location in Mali
- Coordinates: 13°51′N 4°58′W
- Country: Mali
- Region: Ségou Region
- Cercle: Macina Cercle

Population (2009 census)
  - Total: 10,802
- Time zone: UTC+0 (GMT)

Matomo is a rural commune in the Cercle of Macina in the Ségou Region of southern-central Mali. The administrative center (chef-lieu) is the village of Matoma Marka.
