= Monimpébougou =

- Commune and village
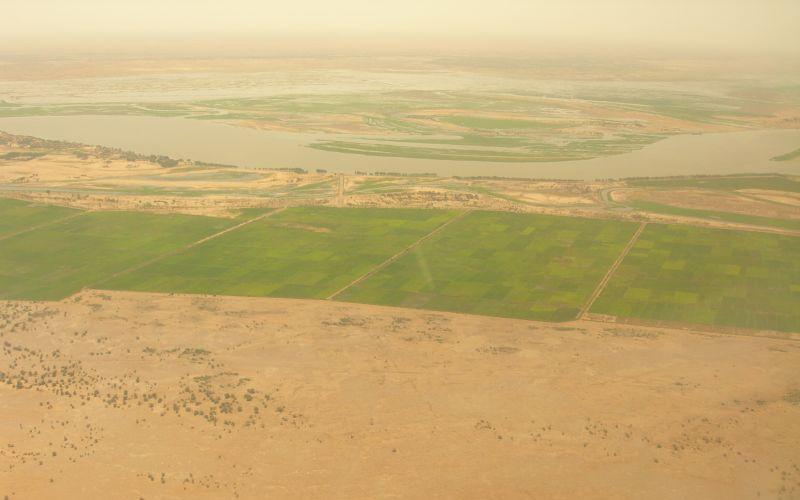
- Monimpébougou in 2006

- Location in Mali
- Coordinates: 14°8′51″N 5°31′18″W
- Country: Mali
- Region: Ségou Region
- Cercle: Macina Cercle

Area
  - Total: 2,249 km^{2} (868 sq mi)

Population (2009 census)
  - Total: 32,899
  - Density: 14.63/km^{2} (37.89/sq mi)
- Time zone: UTC+0 (GMT)

Monimpébougou is a village and rural commune in the Cercle of Macina in the Ségou Region of southern-central Mali. The commune covers an area of approximately 2,249 square kilometers and includes 33 villages. In the 2009 census the commune had a population of 32,899.
