= Dozo =

Members of traditional hunting fraternities of West Africa

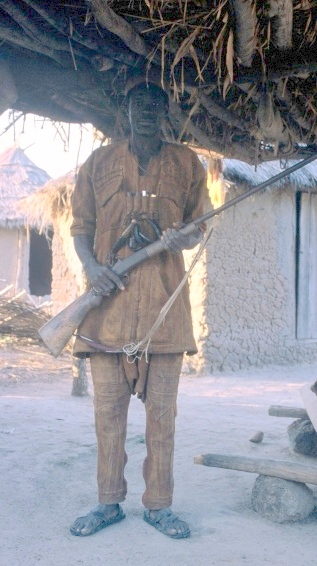
A traditional hunter (in this case, a Bambara in Mali), showing the distinctive brown hunting suit and gris-gris amulets worn around the neck.

The Dozo (also spelled Donzo or Donso, Bambara for hunter, pl. donsow) are traditional hunters in northern Côte d'Ivoire, southeast Mali, and Burkina Faso, and members of a co-fraternity containing initiated hunters and sons of Dozo, called a Donzo Ton. Not an ethnic group, the Dozo are drawn mostly from Mandé-speaking groups (including the Dyula-speaking communities), but are also found among Dogon, and most other ethnic groups in Côte d'Ivoire. Dozo societies increased in the last decades of the twentieth century, and Dozo groups came into political prominence during the Ivorian Civil War.

== History ==
The first Mande hunter societies likely date back at least as far as the foundation of the cities of Dia and Djenné-Djenno. Along with blacksmith societies ancestral to the Komo, they played a critical role in maintaining the unique governance structures that allowed for the growth of urban spaces without a top-down royal or priestly hierarchy.

According to oral traditions, hunters were the first Mandinka to leave Wagadu and settle in the Manding region. Namadi Kani, an ancestor of the Keita dynasty of the Mali Empire, led or founded a brotherhood of hunters to expand his kingdom in the upper Niger River valley. The hunters also formed the core of Sundiata Keita's army, before being gradually professionalized over the history of the empire. The cross-clan links within the hunters' associations was critical to unifying the Manden into the Mali Empire. The 'Hunter's Oath' supposedly sworn by Sundiata's Dozo troops upon his coronation as Malimansa has been celebrated as a founding text of human rights in Africa.

The Faren who governed many Malian provinces were generally members of the Donzo Ton. After the empire's decline, the hunters kept the animist traditions alive.

== Donzo Ton ==
The Donzo Ton (tɔn is a Manding word for age-group, religious, or vocational associations) are one of a number of hunting fraternities common in Mandé-speaking areas of West Africa. Similar and (in the case of West Africa) closely related groups exist as the Kamajor in Sierra Leone, Poro in Liberia, the Mayi-Mayi in Democratic Republic of the Congo, and the Karamojong in Uganda. Sons of Dozos, as well as new adherents, are able to be initiated into the Ton and undergo a series of secret rituals. Collective organisations, as with many vocations in West Africa, existed in part to train and pass on needed skills. Hunters, though, are found in every community, and are not a strictly inherited role.

It is believed that the amulets (gris-gris) worn by Dozos possess magical properties protecting them from harm, and amplifying their vision and hearing. Such amulets, inherited brown hunting clothing, as well as special hats, are said to make them bulletproof. Each local Donzo Ton is led by an elder hunter, the donzokuntigi. Along with ritual and initiation, local Donzo Ton will meet to discuss their work, organise hunts, or settle internal grievances, often in the all-night tonsigi gathering. In this way, the Donzo Ton operates much like a western guild.

Part of the cultural and ritual tradition of the Donzo involves sacrifice and protection of the community. In traditional belief, wild animals killed by hunters released a nyama, a destructive spirit that afflicted the community benefiting from the kill. Donzo Ton trained to perform rituals, cleansing the nyama and enabling them to both share their bounty with the community of non-hunters, and act as spiritual guardians of settled communities from malevolent forces of the forest or bush.

== In Ivorian society and politics ==
While there are records of hunter Tons going back to the Mali Empire, since the 1990s there has been a particular growth of local collectives of Donzo Ton in Côte d'Ivoire. It is believed that this growth first originated along the border with Mali, and spread into forested regions of Côte d'Ivoire. In Mali, hunter associations were organised into a national union (l'Association Nationale des Chasseurs). This is seen as the birth of the Benkadi, a network of Donzo Ton. By the year 2000 there were over 22,000 official members.

One explanation for the huge growth in the Benkadi network in the 1990s is the rapid increase in deforestation (and thus more scarce hunting land) in the north, economic hardship in other vocations, along with the growing insecurity across the country fed by fears of civil war spreading from Liberia and Sierra Leone. World Bank-mandated structural adjustment and a currency devaluation in 1994 helped spread an unprecedented crime wave. These hunter groups, then, were simultaneously respected (even feared) for their power by neighbours while growing in numbers and organisation while the government slid into ethnic conflict and civil war. In many places the Benkadi were hired or simply stepped in to fill this vacuum.

At the beginning of the 1990s, President Houphouët-Boigny had called on public-minded citizens to aid the police, and as crime increased, local officials drafted in hunters in Korhogo and Ferkessédougou. Not only were the hunter militias successful, but their fame spread far beyond the north. Donzow became a common sight in towns and on the roads. They were hired by locals and both sides in the Ivorian Civil War as soldiers, to guard vehicles, direct traffic, or patrol religious sites. This success fed into the growth of Benkadi groups in all parts of Côte d'Ivoire, as the civil war and fragile peace made local organisation of security much sought after. In Abidjan and Bouaké. Donzo Ton leaders opened security offices, trading not only on their northern successes, but on a public perception of special (even magical) abilities of Donzow. Unemployed men from around the country came to Korhogo and Odienné, home of Benkadi leadership, to be initiated into a Donzo Ton, and thus have access to work as well-paid security guards.

=== Civil War ===
While Donzow became guards for hire in the unstable years before the 2002–2005 Ivorian Civil War, their network became associated with northern groups who led the rebel forces. The Donzo Ton, viewed as saviours by some in the south, were also seen as unsophisticated throwbacks to a pre-modern era by many in cosmopolitan Abidjan. The transnational and northern source of the Donzo Ton were seen to conflict with the ethnic nationalism of Ivoirité which feared the presence of Burkinabé labourers and immigrants from Mali as not being "true" Ivorians. Politically, it was Rassemblement des Républicains (RDR) politicians from the north who first entrusted the Donzow with policing duties, and the Donzo Ton leadership became associated with the RDR. Nationalist Presidents Henri Konan Bédié, and later Laurent Gbagbo, condemned these armed Benkadi groups as regressive, divisive and dangerous. It was not surprising, then, when the September 2002 coup began the civil war, northern forces included many identifiable Donzow. One rebel group, the Mouvement populaire ivoirien du Grand Ouest (MPIGO) was thought to be one-fifth Donzow. This participation, while earning the enmity of many in the south, has made leaders of the Donzo Ton Benkadi network powerful figures whose support has been sought by Prime Minister (and former rebel leader) Guillaume Soro's Patriotic Movement of Côte d'Ivoire. Kuruma Lansine, public head of the Benkadi has become a political leader for standing by and speaking for "the dozos".

While most studies stress the stabilising nature the Donzo Ton had on the country both before and after the civil war, human rights organisations have documented a pattern of lawlessness, intimidation, and extrajudicial killings by Donzow groups beginning from at least 1997, through the 1999 coup (in which Donzo Ton set up checkpoints on roads across the north), and the 2002–2005 war.

== In Malian society ==
In 2003 Malian historian Youssouf Tata Cisse published the "Hunter's Oath". The Malian government soon began promoting the historicity and importance of this oath and submitted it to UNESCO for inclusion on its list of Intangible Cultural Heritage of Humanity. In 2009 UNESCO duly listed the "Manden Charter, proclaimed in Kurukan Fuga", but the description of this charter in fact referred to the entirely separate "Hunter's Oath". In October 2009 the Malian government newspaper celebrated the listing as a victory for the country over neighbors coveting Mali's cultural heritage.

In 2017, local civilians accused the Malian government of arming groups of Dozo, who had allegedly carried out a spate of killings of nomadic Fula populations.

In June 2018, Dozo surrounded a village in the Mopti Region, separated members of the Fula ethnic group from the other villagers and killed at least 32 of them. The Fula complain that they are being regularly targeted by the traditional hunters in the name of the fight against jihadists. They accuse the Malian military of supporting such incidents.

== Music ==
The Dozo are also known for their praise singers (see Griot) and rituals, often accompanied by the dozo n’goni, a variant of n'goni West African lute said to have originated among the Senufo hunters of Burkina Faso.

== Galerie ==
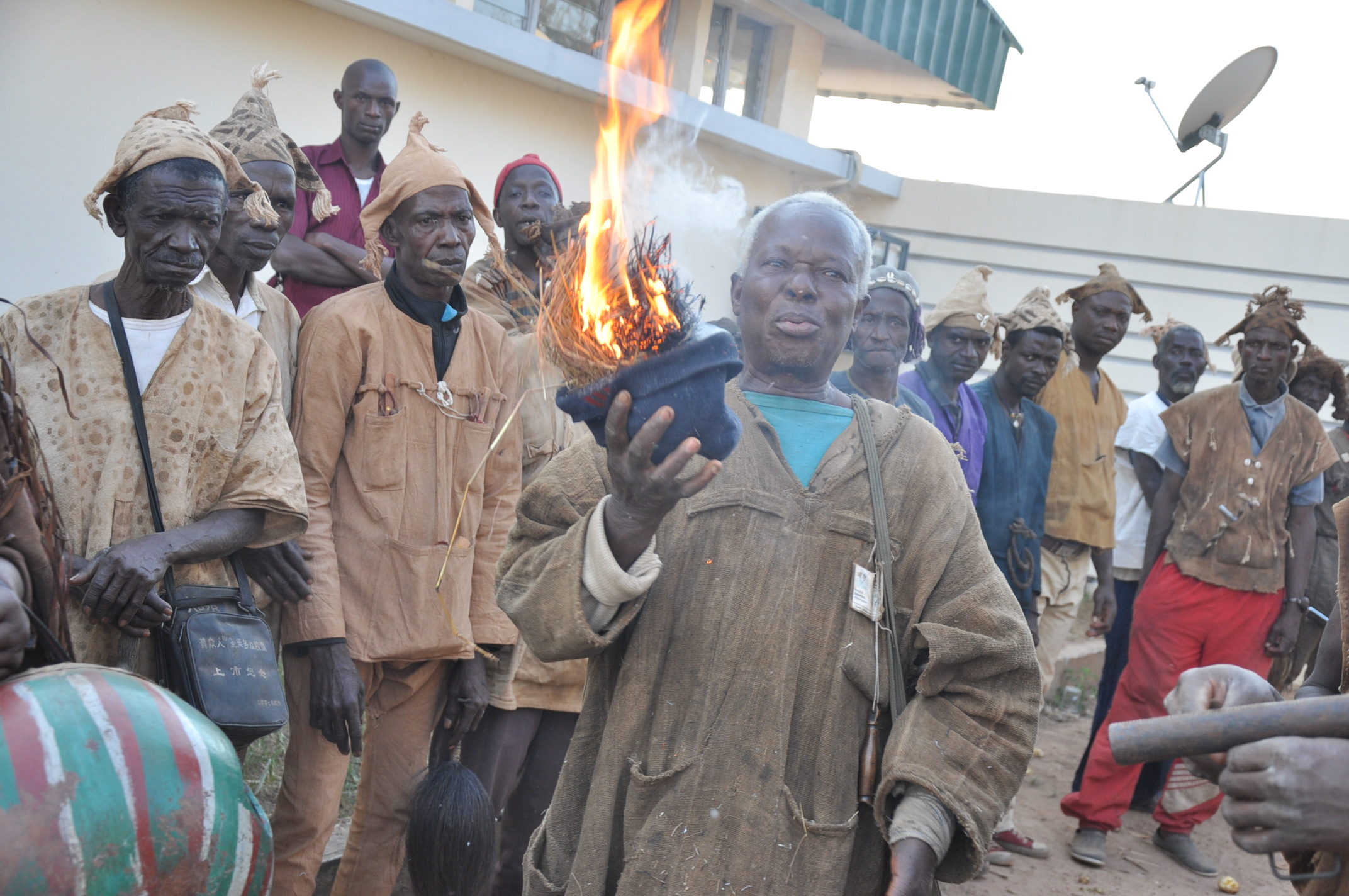
Dozo en Cote d'Ivoire

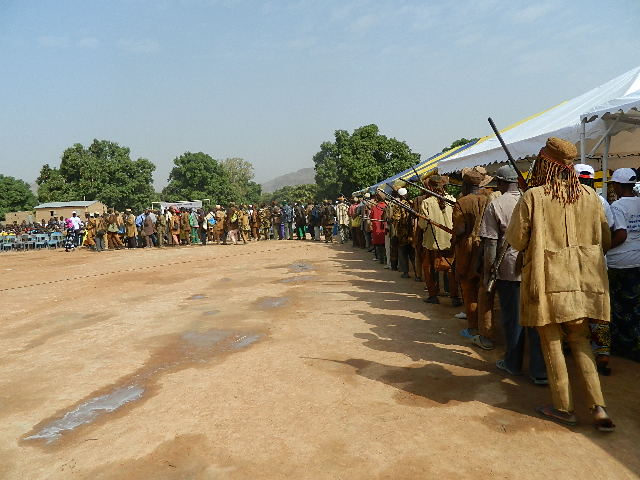
Donzo au Mali

== See also ==
- Caste system in Africa
- Kamajors

== See also ==
- "The Ivory Coast: Country Profile". Travel Africa magazine. Edition 4: Summer 1998. URL accessed 2006-02-28.
- Côte d'Ivoire (PDF) (Report). Vol. 15. Human Rights Watch. August 2003.
- François Wandji. Les dozos, guérisseurs et "chasseurs". L'Humanité: 24 July 2001.
- COTE D’IVOIRE: THE GENERAL’S NEW CLOTHES. CDD Briefing on a fact-finding trip to Côte d'Ivoire, Centre for Democracy and Development (UK), April 2000.
