= Dogofry, Ségou =

Dogofry
- Commune and village
- Location in Mali
- Coordinates: 14°46′50″N 6°1′45″W
- Country: Mali
- Region: Ségou Region
- Cercle: Niono Cercle

Area
  - Total: 3,820 km^{2} (1,470 sq mi)
- Elevation: 273 m (896 ft)

Population (2009 census)
  - Total: 34,057
  - Density: 8.92/km^{2} (23.1/sq mi)
- Time zone: UTC+0 (GMT)

Dogofry is a village and a rural commune in the Cercle of Niono in the Ségou Region of southern-central Mali. The commune covers an area of approximately 3,820 square kilometers and is bordered to the north by the Republic of Mauritania, to the east by the commune of Nampalari, to the southeast by the commune of Diabaly, to the southwest by the commune of Sokolo and to the west by the commune of Guiré in the Cercle of Nara. It includes 19 villages, and had a population of 34,057 in the 2009 census. The south of the commune includes a region irrigated as part of the Office du Niger scheme. The village of Dogofry lies in this irrigated area, about 60 km north of Niono, to the west of the Fala de Molodo and the Distributeur de Kogoni.

The Plan de Sécurité Alimentaire document gives the administrative center of the commune (chef-lieu) as Banamba. This is a larger village than Dogofry (or Dogofry Ba) that lies 4 km to the north. It has the coordinates 14°49′0″N 6°1′5″W.
