= Macina Cercle =

Coordinates: 13°55′N 5°25′W

- Cercle
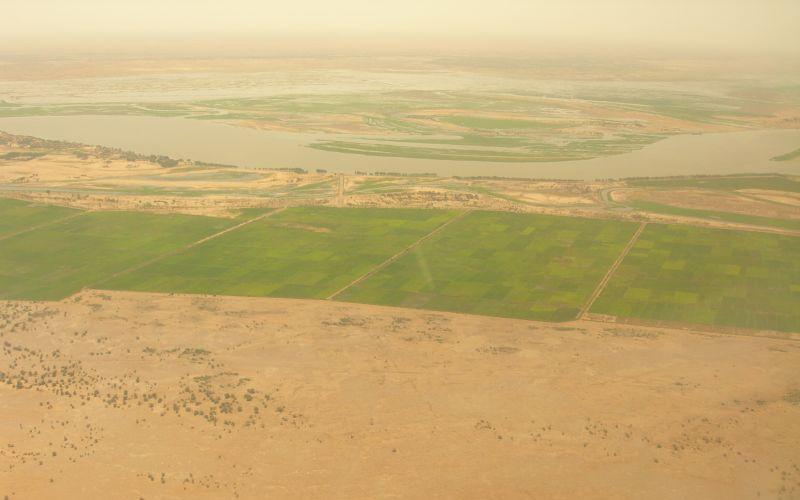

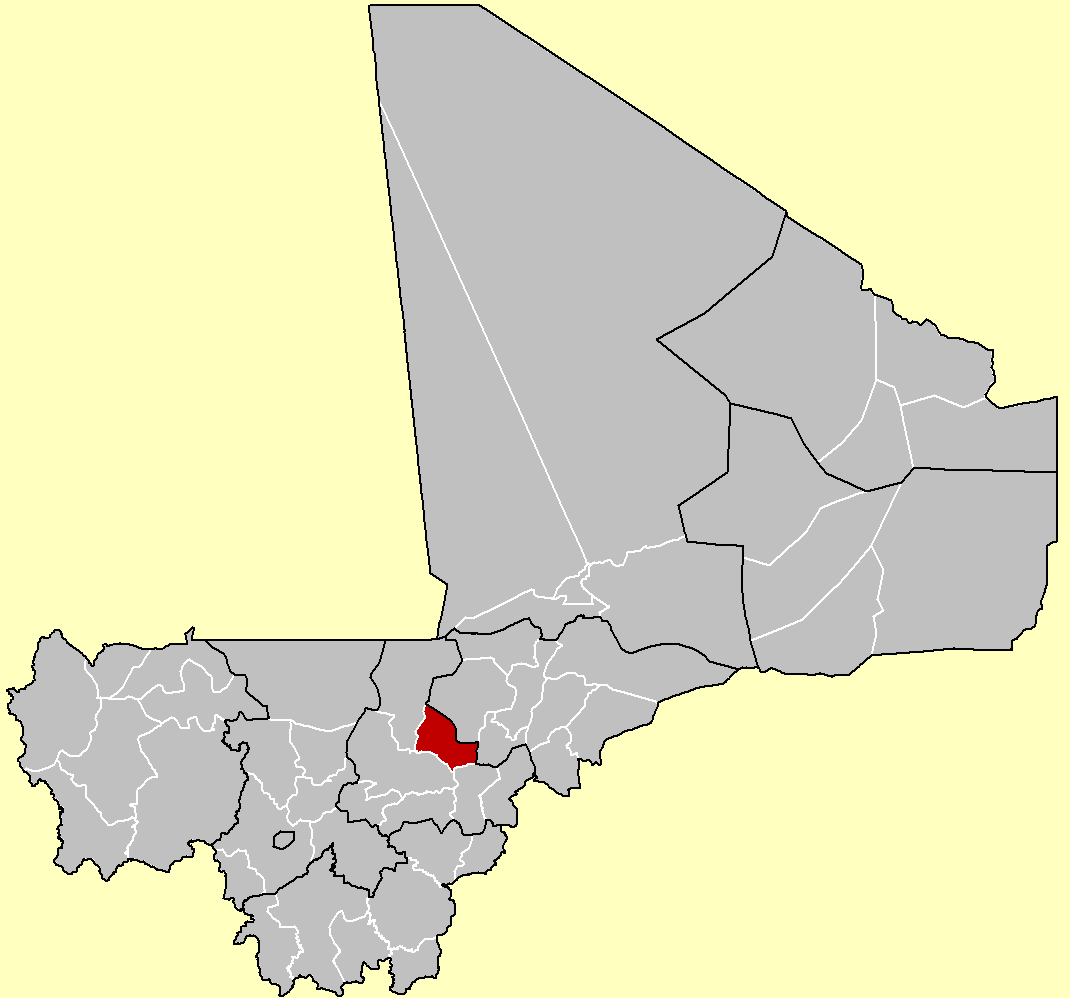
- Location of the Cercle of Macina in Mali
- Country: Mali
- Region: Ségou Region
- Admin HQ (chef-lieu): Macina

Area
  - Total: 11,750 km^{2} (4,540 sq mi)

Population (2009 census)
  - Total: 237,477
  - Density: 20.21/km^{2} (52.35/sq mi)
- Time zone: UTC+0 (GMT)

Macina Cercle is an administrative subdivision of the Ségou Region of Mali. The administrative center (chef-lieu) is the town of Macina.

The cercle is divided into 11 communes:

- Boky Wéré
- Folomana
- Kokry
- Kolongo
- Macina
- Matomo
- Monimpébougou
- Saloba
- Sana
- Souleye
- Tongué
