= Sokolo =

- Commune and town
- Location in Mali
- Coordinates: 14°44′20″N 6°7′16″W
- Country: Mali
- Region: Ségou Region
- Cercle: Niono Cercle

Area
  - Total: 2,219 km^{2} (857 sq mi)

Population (2009 census)
  - Total: 23,338
  - Density: 10.52/km^{2} (27.24/sq mi)
- Time zone: UTC+0 (GMT)

Sokolo is a small town and rural commune in the Cercle of Niona in the Ségou Region of southern-central Mali. The commune has an area of approximately 2,219 square kilometers and includes the town and 17 villages. In the 2009 census the population was 23,338. The town lies 56 km north of Niono.

On January 26, 2020, A Malian Armed Forces camp in Sokolo was attacked, leading to the deaths of 19 Malian soldiers.
