= Diabaly =

- Commune and town
- Location in Mali
- Coordinates: 14°41′N 6°1′W
- Country: Mali
- Region: Ségou Region
- Cercle: Niono Cercle

Area
  - Total: 1,538 km^{2} (594 sq mi)
- Elevation: 273 m (896 ft)

Population (2009 census)
  - Total: 35,266
  - Density: 22.93/km^{2} (59.39/sq mi)
- Time zone: UTC+0 (GMT)

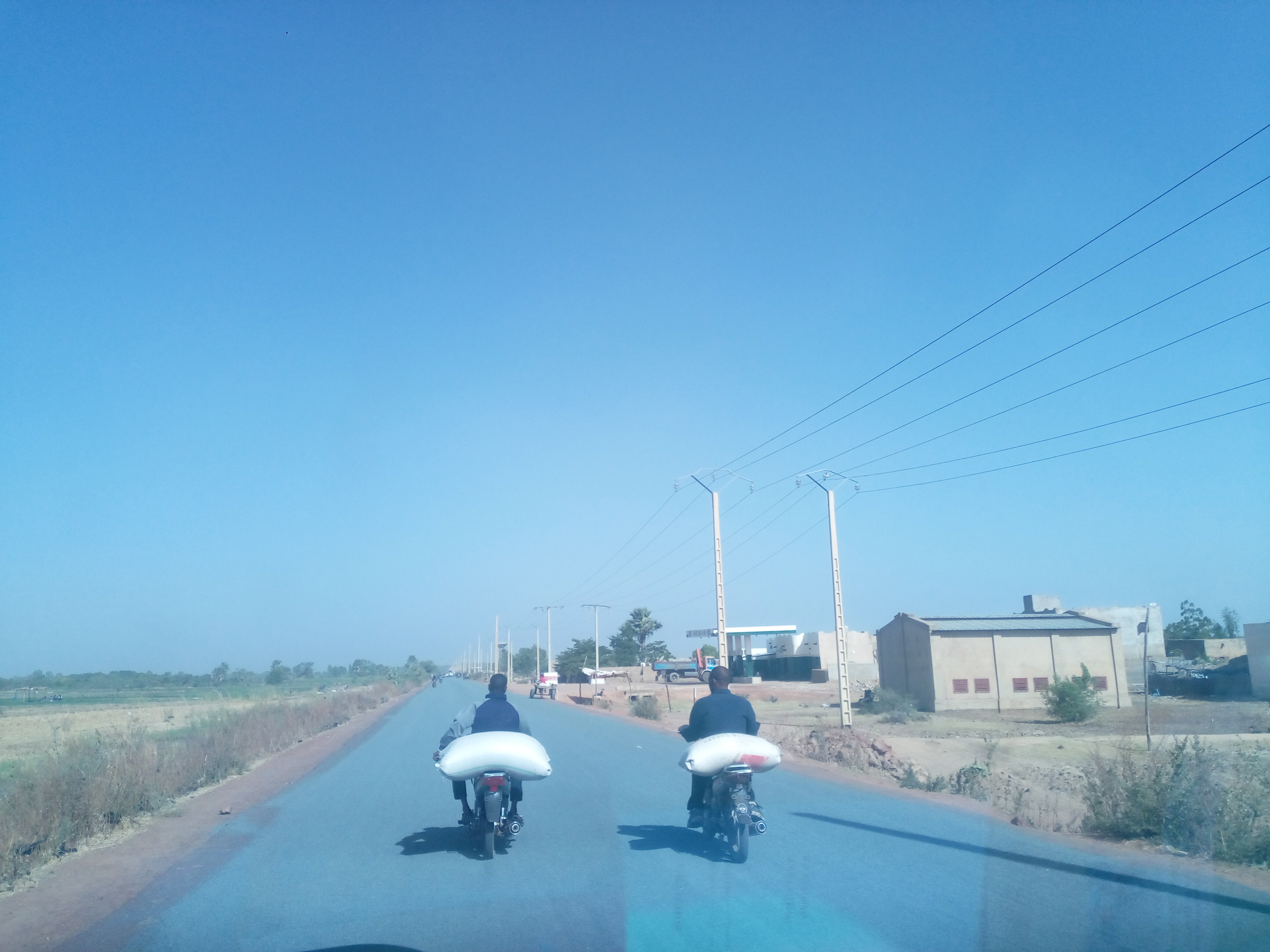
Smallholder farmers transporting their paddies to the rice mill in Daibaly for processing

Diabaly is a small town and rural commune in the Cercle of Niono in the Ségou Region of Mali. The commune has an area of approximately 1,538 square kilometres (594 sq mi) and includes 28 villages as well as the town. In the 2009 census the commune had a population of 35,266. The town lies 50 kilometres (31 mi) north of Niono on the west side of the Fala de Molodo channel that forms part of the Office du Niger irrigation scheme. The fields around the town are irrigated but much of the commune lies to the east of the Fala de Molodo in an area that lacks irrigation.

On 8 September 2012, during the Northern Mali conflict, a group of Malian army soldiers arrested 17 Islamic preachers coming from Mauritania at a checkpoint near the village. The 17 men were suspected to be Islamist militants and 16 of them were executed. Opposition military forces occupied Diabaly for a week starting from 14 January 2013.

== Northern Mali conflict ==
Events related to the Northern Mali conflict occurred in Diabaly in September 2012 and January 2013.

=== September 2012 massacre ===
On the evening of 8 September 2012, 17 unarmed Dawa Tablighi preachers from Mauritania arrived in Dogofry, 15 kilometres (9.3 mi) north of Diabaly, in a Toyota minibus, on their way to a religious conference in Bamako. A group of Malian army soldiers arrested the preachers and executed all but one of them.

Associated Press attributed responsibility for the executions to "rank-and-file soldiers [who] carried out the massacre of their own accord, ignoring not only the normal rules of engagement but also their own command structure." The government of Mali published an announcement "expressing deep condolences, but stopping short of taking responsibility for the deaths."

Prior to its formal investigation in Mali, the International Criminal Court stated that, "There is reasonable basis to believe that the war crime of murder under Article 8(2)(c)(i) was committed by [Malian army] forces."

=== January 2013 rebel occupation ===
On 14 January 2013, five opposition force vehicles entered Diabaly after being attacked by the French Air Force. The opposition groups fought with Mali army soldiers for about 10 hours and settled within 200 metres (220 yd) of a Mali army base in Diabaly. Diabaly returned to Mali governmental control when Malian and French forces entered it a week later, on 21 January.

=== Later attacks ===
On 25 January 2026, JNIM ambushed FAMA and Africa Corps forces near the town, capturing equipment and destroying a vehicle.
