= Niono =

- Commune and town
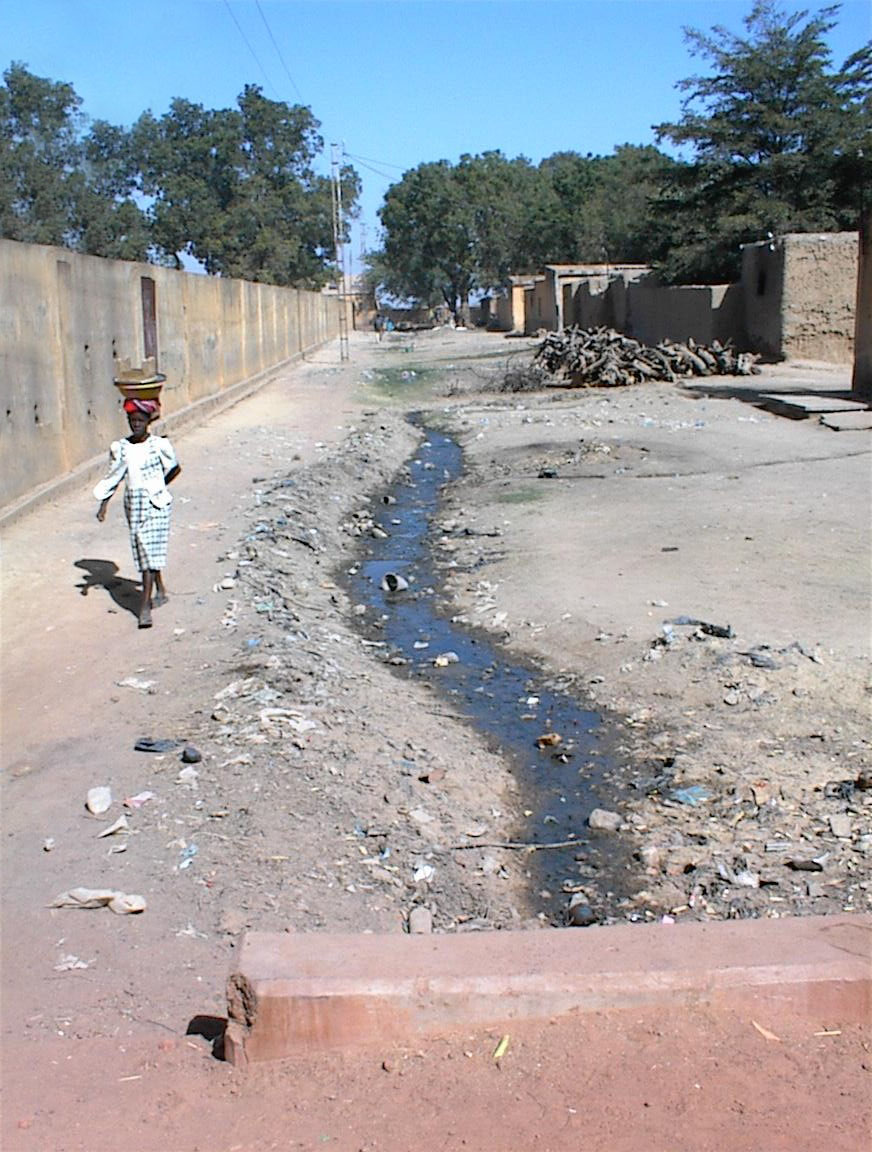
- A woman walks down a side street in Niono, during the dry season, January 2003.

- Location within Mali
- Coordinates: 14°15′0″N 5°59′10″W
- Country: Mali
- Region: Segou
- Cercle: Niono Cercle

Area
  - Total: 491 km^{2} (190 sq mi)
- Elevation: 277 m (909 ft)

Population (2009 census)
  - Total: 91,554
  - Density: 186/km^{2} (483/sq mi)
- (commune)
- Time zone: UTC+0 (GMT)

Niono is a town and commune located in the Ségou Region of Mali. The commune has an area of approximately 491 square kilometers and includes the town and 20 of the surrounding villages. In the 2009 census it had a population of 91,554. The town is the capital of the Niono Cercle, one of seven subdivisions (cercles) of the Ségou Region. It lies on the northwest edge of the Inner Niger Delta, about 65 km from the main channel of the Niger River.

== Office du Niger ==
Niono is an important town of the Office du Niger irrigation scheme which was established during the last decades of French colonial rule and continued after independence by the Malian state. Water from the Niger River is diverted into a system of canals at the Markala dam 35 km downstream of Ségou. The water flows north for 65 km in the Canal du Sahel and is then used to irrigate the flat alluvial plains around Niono that form part of the 'Delta Mort' (Dead Delta). Although the French colonial administration constructed the system to produce cotton for the textile industry, the main agricultural product is now rice. Each year around 2.7 km^{3} of water are diverted from the Niger corresponding to 8.3 percent of the total flow. The water is used to irrigate about 750 square kilometers of farmland which in 1999/2000 produced 320,000 tonnes of rice representing 40 percent of the total Malian production.

== Architecture ==
The Great Mosque of Niono is perhaps the most internationally recognized site in the town having received the Aga Khan Award for Architecture in 1983. A mosque on the site was constructed in 1945 and then subsequently enlarged. The present building dates from 1973. The mosques of Djenné and Mopti served as models.

== Development projects ==
At least two major humanitarian projects have attempted to ameliorate the lives of people in Niono and the outlying areas. Led by American and Malian Rotary Clubs and Engineers Without Borders (USA) Chapters, the groups surveyed in February 2008 a rainwater drainage channel. The drainage channel, known as a "collecteur de pluies" in French, runs 2 kilometers through the city center. During the rainy season, flooding causes havoc, and during the rest of the year, the drainage channel becomes a breeding ground for disease. The intent of the project is to minimize both the flooding and the unsanitary stagnant water in the drainage channel.

A new paved road of is under construction between Niono and Timbuktu running to the north of the Inland Niger Delta. The 565 km road will pass through Nampala, Niafunké, Tonka, Diré and Goundam. The completed 81 km section between Niono and the small village of Goma Coura in the commune of Dogofry was financed by the Millennium Challenge Corporation. This new section will service the Alatona irrigation system development of the 'Office du Niger'. The 484 km section between Goma Coura and Timbuktu is being financed by the European Development Fund.

== Climate ==
The climate is influenced by the West African Monsoon. The average annual rainfall in the 35-year period between 1961 and 1995 was 504 mm, but there were large year-to-year fluctuations. In 1983, the driest year, only 291 mm fell, while in 1965, the wettest year, 820 mm was recorded. The rainfall normally only occurs between June and October. The hottest month is May, when the average maximum daily temperature is around 40 °C.

== Gallery ==
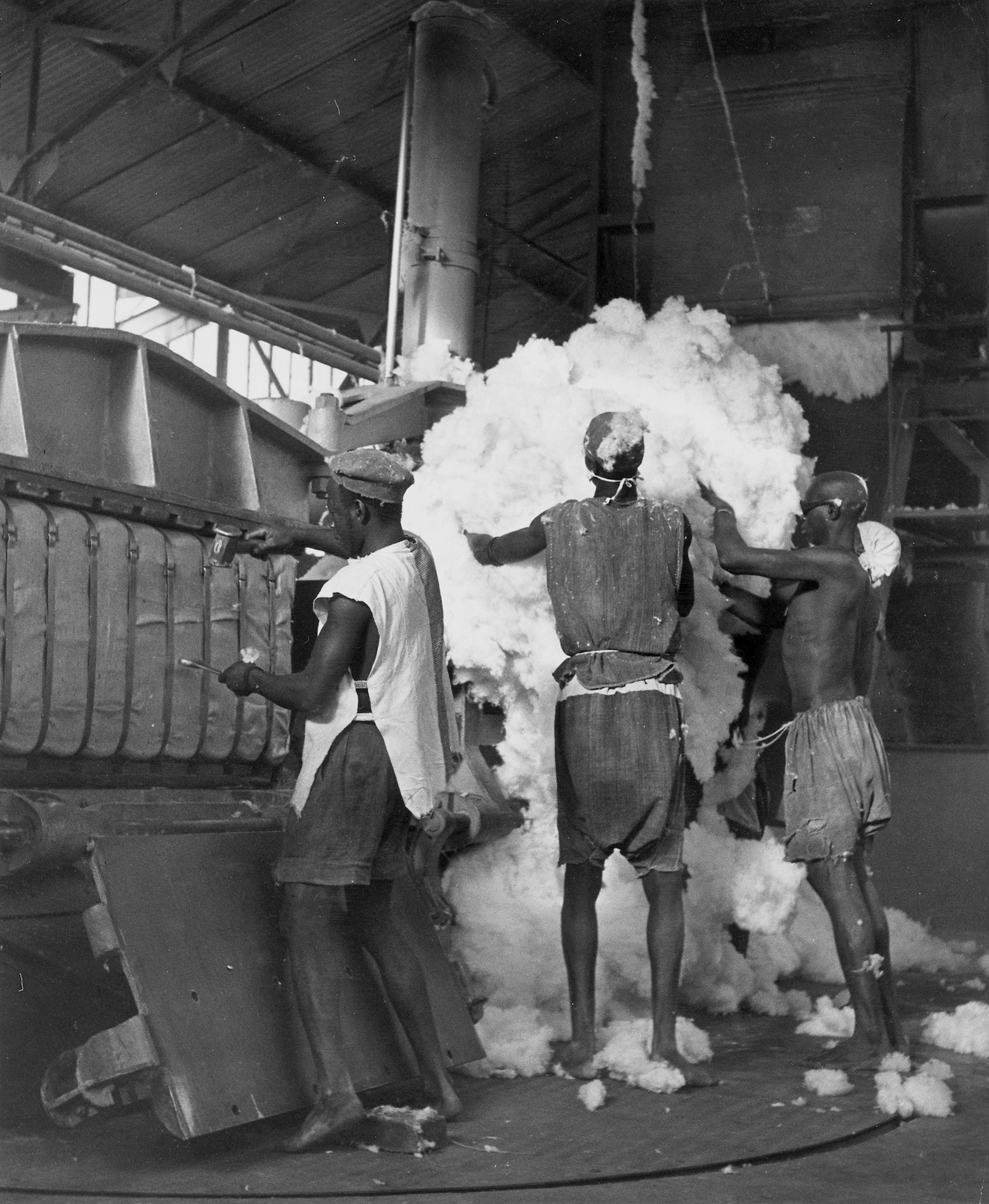
Cotton was compressed into 400-pound bales for export to other parts of Africa and to France, ca. 1950.

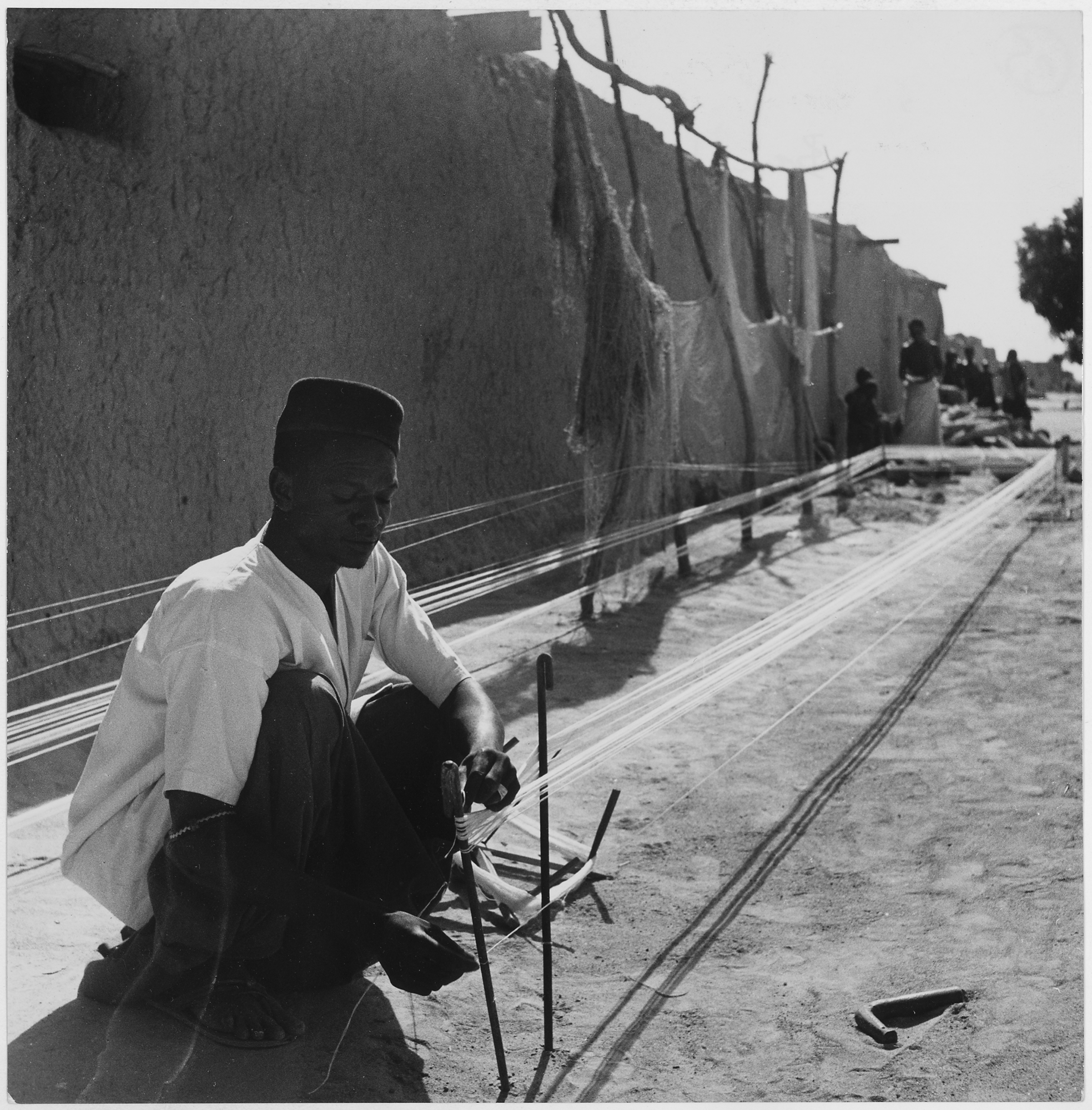
In the village of Niono, a native prepares thread - spun from locally-grown cotton - for weaving, ca. 1950.

== See also ==
- List of cities in Mali
