= Office du Niger =

Coordinates: 14°15′N 5°59′W

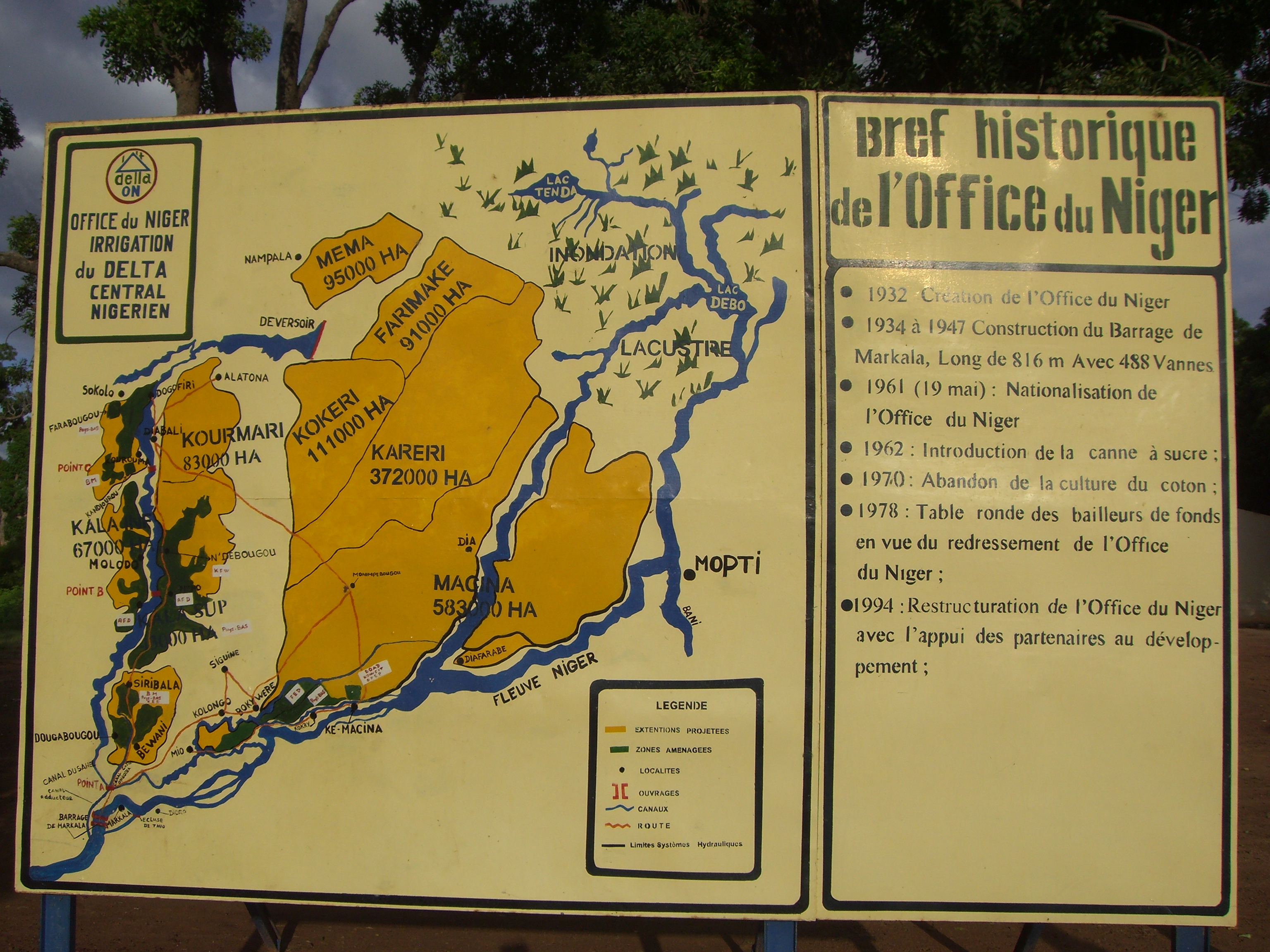
- Sign announcing the Office du Niger near the Markala dam in Mali

Water resource management overview
- Formed: January 5, 1932; 94 years ago
- Jurisdiction: Niger River in Mali
- Website: www.office-du-niger.org.ml

The Office du Niger is a semi-autonomous government agency in Mali that administers a large irrigation scheme in the Ségou Region of the country. Water from the Niger River is diverted into a system of canals at the Markala dam 35 kilometres (22 mi) downstream of Ségou. The water is used to irrigate nearly 100,000 hectares (390 mi^{2}) of the flat alluvial plains to the north and northeast of Markala that form part of the Delta mort. Although the French colonial administration constructed the system to produce cotton for the textile industry, the main agricultural product is now rice. Around 320,000 tons are grown each year representing 40 percent of the total Malian production. Large quantities of sugar cane are also grown in joint ventures between a Chinese company and the Malian state. The irrigation scheme uses 2.7 km^{3} (0.65 cu mi) of water each year corresponding to around 10 percent of the total flow of the Niger River.

== Historical development ==
The Office du Niger was first conceived in the 1910s. By the late 1920s director Émile Bélime's plans included 1 850 000 hectares of irrigated rice farms, a 3000+ km railway link to North Africa, and the forced relocation of 1-3.5 million Malian peasants. While these massive goals were never reached, tens of thousands of locals were rounded up and forced to work on the project in horrible conditions. By 1948 irrigation had only reached around 20 000 hectares, worked by less than 23 000 farmers. By the time the project was nationalized in the early 1960s, this number had grown, but only to 42 000.

== Niger River ==
Flow of the Niger River at Markala
- Average flow in m^{3}/s of the Niger River at the Markala Dam

The Niger River, and its tributaries, the Sankarani, the Niandan, the Milo and the Tinkisso, rise in Guinea Highlands and the Fouta Djallon nearly 750 km (470 mi) to the southwest of Markala. The climate of both Mali and Guinea is determined by the West African Monsoon with the maximum rainfall occurring in August, but while the annual rainfall in the Guinea Highlands approaches 2,000 mm (79 in), that at Markala is only 600 mm (24 in). The short but relatively intense rainy season produces a surge of water flowing down the river system which in turn leads to the flooding of the Inner Niger Delta. Since the construction of the Sélingué hydroelectric dam on the Sankarani in 1982, some of the flood water has been retained and released later during the dry season.

At the Markala dam, in an average year, the discharge of the Niger River reaches a peak of around 2,800 m^{3} (99,000 cu ft) in the second half of September but drops to under 120 m^{3} (4,200 cu ft) in the dry season between February and April. The average discharge is around 800 m^{3} (28,000 cu ft), but there are large year-to-year variations in the intensity of the monsoon and thus in the water flowing in the river. In a dry year such as 1989, the average discharge was only 539 m^{3} (19,000 cu ft), while in a wet year such as 1995 the discharge was 1,229 m^{3} (43,400 cu ft).

== Water management ==
The Markala Dam maintains the water in the Niger at a level 5.5 m (18 ft) above the lowest point of the river bed. Water for the Office du Niger scheme is diverted into the main irrigation canal, the Canal Adducteur, on the left bank 4 km (2.5 mi) upstream from the dam.

=== Irrigation system ===
The irrigation scheme utilizes two ancient branches of the Niger River, the Fala de Molodo that runs northwards from the Niger for 135 km (84 mi) to the Alatona region and the Fala de Boky-Wéré that runs in an east-northeast direction towards the town of Macina. Before the construction of the Markala Dam these channels would fill with water during the annual flood.

The Canal Adducteur has a capacity of 287 m^{3}/s (10,100 cu ft/s) and runs for 9.8 km (6.1 mi) to the junction called "Point A". Here the water is distributed into three canals, the Canal du Sahel that flows northwards to the Fala de Molodo, the Canal Costes-Ongoïba that supplies water to the Siribala sugar cane farm and the Canal Macina that carries water to the Fala de Boky-Wéré.

=== Irrigation impact on the river ===
Between 2000 and 2005 the average flow of water used by the Office du Niger was 87 m^{3}/s (3,100 cu ft/s) but the flow varied throughout the year, reaching a peak of 135 m^{3}/s (4,800 cu ft/s) in October and dropping to a minimum of 48 m^{3}/s (1,700 cu ft/s) in December. On average the Office du Niger used around 10 percent of the total water in the river and although during the wet season only a small proportion was diverted, at the end of the dry season when the river discharge was at a minimum, a large proportion was used for irrigation. To satisfy some of the downstream requirements, there is an international agreement to allow at least 40 m^{3}/s (1,400 cu ft/s) of water to flow past the Markala dam at all times. In March this left on average only 60 m^{3}/s (2,100 cu ft/s) available for irrigation and in the driest year only 30 m^{3}/s (1,100 cu ft/s). The water released by the Sélingué Dam to generate electrical power increased the flow of water in the dry season.

The maximum amount of water diverted from the river is set by the dimensions of the canal. Until the upgrade associated with the Alatona project in 2007-12 the greatest flow was around 147 m^{3}/s (5,200 cu ft/s) but with the upgrade to the canal system flows of up to 287 m^{3}/s (10,100 cu ft/s) should be possible. Taking into account the 40 m^{3}/s (1,400 cu ft/s) passing through the dam, the Niger would need a flow of at least 326 m^{3}/s (11,500 cu ft/s) to satisfy the demand. The river only has this amount of water between July and December in an average year and between August and November in a dry year. There is a longstanding proposal to build a hydroelectric dam at Fomi in Guinea on the Niandan. The effect on the Niger at Markala would be similar to that of the Sélingué Dam: the flow would be reduced during the wet season and increased during the dry season. This increased flow during the dry season would allow the Office du Niger to divert additional water from the river.

=== Extent of irrigated areas ===
Keïta et al. (2002) give the total irrigated area in January 2000 as 74,000 ha (180,000 acres) and provide the following breakdown:

- 55,600 ha (137,000 acres) of rice polders within the Office du Niger
- 1,600 ha (4,000 acres) of new rice polders at Macina and Bewani
- 5,800 ha (14,000 acres) of sugar cane
- 3,000 ha (7,400 acres) of rice polders managed by the Opération Riz Ségou
- 8,000 ha (20,000 acres) of land cultivated outside the Office du Niger embankments (hors-casiers)

The extent of the irrigated area has since increased. The N-Sukula joint venture setup in 2009 controls 20,000 ha (49,000 acres) of land of which 10,646 ha (26,310 acres) has been irrigated for the cultivation of sugar cane. The Millennium Challenge Corporation funded development at Alatona which ended in 2012, included 5,200 ha (13,000 acres) of rice polders and market gardens.

== Sugar cane ==
Since the 1960s sugar cane has been cultivated in an area between Markala and Niono. The Dougabougou complex covering an area of 1654 ha between the Fala de Molodo and the Costes-Ongoïba Canal, was established in 1965 together with a sugar mill capable of processing 400 tonnes of cane a day. This was followed in 1974 by the establishment of the larger 3520 ha Siribala complex at the northern end of the Costes-Ongoïba canal. The associated mill had an initial daily capacity of 1000 tonnes. Both complexed were established with Chinese financial aid and managed by the Office du Niger. The farms employed salaried workers to grow the cane and hired seasonal workers at harvest time.

In 1996 the two sugar producing complexes were taken over by SUKALA, a Sino-Malian public–private partnership in a debt-to-equity swap arrangement with 60 percent of the 5 billion franc CFA (7.6 million Euro) equity held by China Light Industrial Corporation for Foreign Economic and Technical Co-operation (CLETC) and 40 percent by the Malian government. In 2009 the company produced around 39,000 tonnes of sugar and 2.8 million tonnes of ethanol. The sugar production represents about a quarter of the annual Malian consumption.

A separate Sino-Malian joint venture, N-SUKALA, was agreed in June 2009 between CLETC and the Malian government. Of the 8.8 billion franc CFA equity (13.4 million Euro), 60 percent is held by CLETC with the remainder held by the Malian state. The company is developing 20,000 ha of land near to the Dougabougou complex that had not previously been irrigated. At the time of the agreement the land was occupied by a number of villages. The construction of a new sugar cane processing plant and refinery with a capacity of 6,000 tonnes a day, expandable to 8,000 tonnes was begun at the end of July 2009. The new sugar cane farm will be irrigated using several hundred rotary centre pivot sprinkler systems. The complex is expected to produce around 100,000 tonnes of sugar and 9.6 million tonnes of ethanol each year.

== Alatona expansion ==
In November 2006 the Millennium Challenge Corporation, a United States foreign aid agency, signed a 460 million US dollar agreement with the Malian Government to develop the Alatona zone of the Office du Niger and to upgrade Bamako Airport. The project was intended to run for a period of five years between September 2007 to September 2012 but was terminated in May 2012 after a military coup deposed the elected civilian government of Amadou Toumani Touré. Of the total investment, 235 million US dollars were assigned to the Alatona irrigation project.

The Alatona Irrigation Project included the upgrading and paving of the 81 km of road between Niono with Goma Coura, increasing the capacity of the main canal system linking the Alatona region with the Niger River and the establishment of the Alatona region itself with its small irrigation canals and social infrastructure. The initial plan was to irrigate an area of 14,000 ha but this was later reduced to 5,200 ha.

== Large-scale land leases ==
From around 2008, in an effort to attract foreign investment, the Malian government began offering 30 or 50 year leases on large areas of farmland that had not previously been irrigated. The aim was to bring about a large expansion of the total irrigated area. At the time, other than the Dougabougou and Siribala sugar cane plantations, all the irrigated land was cultivated by small family farms. The average area was around 3.3 ha. The farmers did not have title to the land which was all owned by the state.

The policy of granting leases on large areas of farmland has attracted criticism on the grounds that the procedure lacked transparency and the land rights of local communities were being ignored. Although the development of the leased land leads to a competition for water and requires resettlement of the resident population no environmental and social impact assessments have been published.

The most high-profile case is the Malibya project. In 2008 the Malian government awarded a 50-year renewable lease for 100,000 ha of un-irrigated farmland to the Libyan government. The land was to be managed by Malibya, a subsidiary of Libya's sovereign wealth fund. Although the details were not made public, a leaked copy of the agreement was later posted on the internet. No rent was to be paid for the land, but an annual fee of 2,470 F CFA (3.77 euro) was to be paid for each hectare irrigated by a sprinkler system. The land lies to the northeast of the town of Macina, and at the time was occupied by a number of villages.

As the first stage in the development, Malibya arranged for the constructed a 40 km canal and a new paved road by the China Geo-Engineering Corporation (CGC), a subsidiary of Sinopec. The canal begins at Kolongo Tomo and runs in a northeasterly direction parallel to the Fala de Boky-Wéré. It passes to the north of village of Boky Wéré and ends near the hamlet of Tangana. Malibya announced that they were planning to initially irrigate an area of 25,000 ha. Although the canal has a capacity of 130 m^{3}/s, the maximum flow will be much less than this. According to the hydraulic report for the Alatona project, the capacity of the Canal du Macina that feeds water into the Fala de Boky-Wéré is 75 m^{3}/s and this water is also used to irrigate the existing 20,712 ha of the Macina irrigation zone.
