= Nampalari =

- Commune
- Location in Mali
- Coordinates: 15°16′45″N 5°33′10″W
- Country: Mali
- Region: Ségou Region
- Cercle: Niono Cercle

Government

Area
  - Total: 5,111 km^{2} (1,973 sq mi)
- Elevation: 266 m (873 ft)

Population (2009 census)
  - Total: 11,052
  - Density: 2.162/km^{2} (5.601/sq mi)
- Time zone: UTC+0 (GMT)

Nampalari is a rural commune in the Cercle of Niono in the Ségou Region of Mali. The commune has an area of 5,111 square kilometers and contains 22 villages. In the 2009 census it had a population of 11,052. The chef-lieu is the village of Nampala.
