= Niono Cercle =

Coordinates: 14°45′N 6°00′W

- Cercle
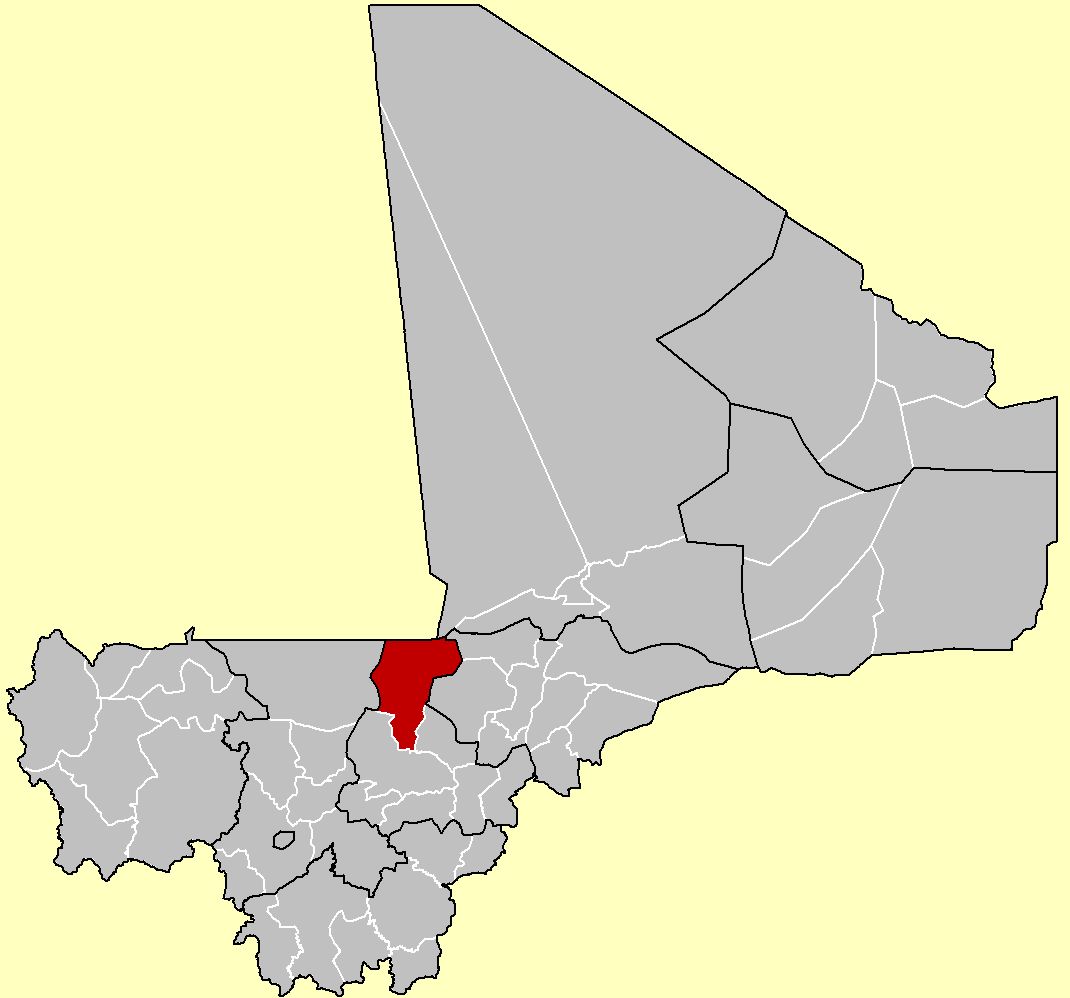
- Location of the Cercle of Niono in Mali
- Country: Mali
- Region: Ségou Region
- Admin HQ (chef-lieu): Niono

Area
  - Total: 23,063 km^{2} (8,905 sq mi)

Population (2009 census)
  - Total: 365,443
  - Density: 15.845/km^{2} (41.039/sq mi)
- Time zone: UTC+0 (GMT)

Niono Cercle is an administrative subdivision of the Ségou Region of Mali. The administrative center (chef-lieu) is the town of Niono.

The cercle is divided into 12 communes:

- Diabaly
- Dogofry
- Kala Siguida
- Mariko
- Nampalari
- Niono
- Pogo
- Siribala
- Sirifila-Boundy
- Sokolo
- Toridaga-Ko
- Yeredon Saniona
