= CIY (disambiguation) =

CIY is the IATA code of Comiso Airport, an airport in Comiso, Italy

CIY or ciy can also refer to:

- Cumanagoto language, an endangered language spoken in Venezuela
- Chaiya railway station, a train station in Chaiya, Surat Thani province, Thailand

== See also ==
- See (disambiguation)
- CI (disambiguation)
- CY (disambiguation)
- City (disambiguation)
