= Siella =

Siella may refer to:

- Berula
- Siella, Mali
