= Dioundiou Konkankan =

- Village
- Interactive map of Dioundiou Konkankan
- Coordinates: 12°52′17″N 5°03′14″W
- Country: Mali
- Region: Ségou Region
- Cercle: San Cercle
- Commune: Kaniegue
- Time zone: UTC+0 (GMT)

Dioundiou Konkankan is a village and seat of the commune of Kaniegue in the San Cercle in the Ségou Region of southern-central Mali.
