= Sy (disambiguation) =

Sy is a given name, nickname and surname.

Sy or SY may also refer to:

== Places ==
- Sy, Belgium, a town in the Ardennes
- Sy, Ardennes, a commune in France
- Sy, Mali, a small town and commune
- 1714 Sy, an asteroid
- SY postcode area, the British post code area for Shrewsbury
- Syria (ISO 3166-1 country code)
  - .sy, the country code top level domain for Syria

== Other uses ==
- Sonic Youth, an American rock band
- Office of Security, a former name for the U.S. State Department's Diplomatic Security Service
- China Railways SY, a Chinese class of industrial 2-8-2 steam locomotive
- SY or S/Y, a ship prefix for sailing yacht or steam yacht
- SY, Sun Country Airlines's IATA airline code
- SY, Sybase's New York Stock Exchange ticker symbol

== See also ==
- Cy (disambiguation)
