= Kassorola =

Coordinates: 12°45′20″N 4°58′27″W

- Commune
- Interactive map of Kassorola
- Country: Mali
- Region: Ségou Region
- Cercle: San Cercle
- Admin HQ (chef-lieu): Nianasso

Population (2009)
  - Total: 16,275
- Time zone: UTC+0 (GMT)

Kassorola is a commune in the Cercle of San in the Ségou Region of Mali. The administrative center is the town of Nianasso. In a 2009 census, this regions total population was 16,275.
