= Dah, Mali =

Coordinates: 13°09′36″N 4°53′39″W

Dah
- Commune and town
- Interactive map of Dah
- Country: Mali
- Region: Ségou Region
- Cercle: San Cercle

Population (1998)
  - Total: 10,446
- Time zone: UTC+0 (GMT)

Dah or Daa is a small town and commune in Cercle of San, Ségou Region, Mali. In 1998 the commune had a population of 10,446.

== History ==
Dah was the seat of a kingdom, a subdivision of the historical province of Bendugu. According to local legend, it was founded by a devout member of the Traore family who, after making the hajj pilgrimage to Mecca, left the Mali emperor's pagan court. Cadet branches of the local Traore dynasty were installed in Woron and Siella/Shyela on the north bank of the Bani River, as well as in Tara, N'Goa and Masadugu to the south. San was also a part of the kingdom. In 1572 Askia Daoud, leader of the Songhai Empire, sent the Kurmina-fari to ransack Daa, perhaps in response of an internal succession dispute and reversion to overtly pagan religious practices. The royal family were captured, but later freed after the intervention of their close relative, the king of N'goa. After the collapse of the Songhai, Daa joined in Djenne's rebellion against the Pashalik of Timbuktu in 1632.
