= Tene =

Tene may refer to:

== Places ==
- Tene, Mali, a commune in Mali
- Těně, a municipality in the Czech Republic
- Teneh Omarim, also known as Tene, an Israeli settlement
- Tenerife, Spain

== People ==
- Florin Tene, a Romanian footballer

== Archaeology ==
- La Tène (archaeological site)
  - La Tène culture, an Iron Age culture
