= San Clemente Canyon =

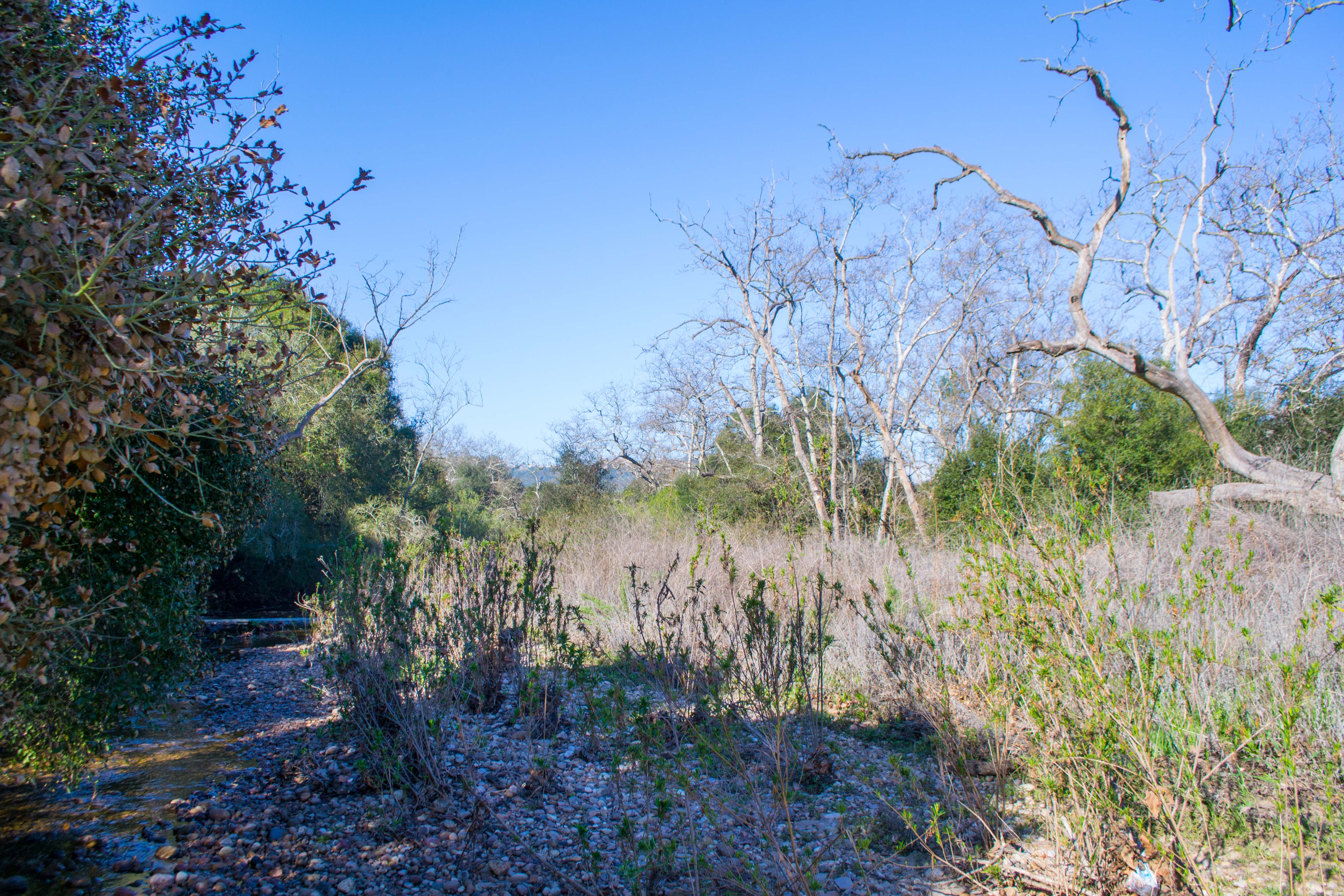
San Clemente Canyon, in Marian Bear Memorial Park.

San Clemente Canyon is a canyon in San Diego, California. Marian Bear Memorial Park, a linear open space park, is along the canyon and in the southern tributary arroyos and mesa.

== Park ==
A visitor crossing a bridge on the trail in the canyon

The canyon and Marian Bear Memorial Park parallel the San Clemente Canyon Freeway (State Route 52) (along northern canyon slopes), between its junctions with Interstate 5 (on west) and Interstate 805 (on east) at the ends.

The park provides a natural setting in the midst of a busy urban area. The 467 acres (189 ha) of dedicated natural parkland include finger canyons and mesas on the south side.

Toyon fruit in San Clemente Canyon

A western fence lizard in San Clemente Canyon

The main canyon and its tributaries continue to support a population of resident wildlife including raccoons, skunks, rabbits, amphibians, reptiles, and birds, and serve as a pathway for coyote, fox, and other native mammals. Along the length of the canyon are coast live oak, California sycamore, and native willow tree woodlands, with an undergrowth of native and other plant species. The chaparral and riparian California native plant communities are closely defined by their microclimates and underlying soils.

=== History ===
The Native American Kumeyaay people had historically inhabited the area of San Diego County for 10,000 years and was home to a Kumeyaay village called Onap, at the intersection of the San Clemente Canyon and Rose Canyon. Evidence of their presence still remains in San Clemente Canyon.

In the late 19th century, this area was named Clemente Canyon for a native American rancher. During the 1970s its natural ecosystem and habitats were threatened by plans to place the San Clemente Canyon Freeway (State Route 52) along the canyon floor.

Marian Bear, an active community leader and environmentalist, worked to preserve the canyon in its natural state. She was the driving force behind realigning the highway from the canyon floor to the north hillsides above it. In the 1980s another community campaign resulted in an additional 72 acres in the southeast section added, for the present total of 467 acres.

== Canyon geology ==
Over 40 million years ago an ocean covered San Clemente Canyon during the Eocene epoch of the Paleogene period. Horizontal lines of round rocks at many levels, separated by clay and sand, represent the various levels of the ocean washing sand away and leaving rocks at surf level.

Fossilized mollusks, such as snails and clams from that period are still found in the canyon's walls. The fossils are preserved in the sandstones and siltstones of the Scripps Formation that is best exposed in the roadcuts along Regents Road and Genesee Avenue.

== See also ==
- Parks in San Diego
