= N'Goa =

Coordinates: 13°14′25″N 5°08′50″W

- Commune and town
- Interactive map of N'Goa
- Country: Mali
- Region: Ségou Region
- Cercle: San Cercle

Population (1998)
  - Total: 7,172
- Time zone: UTC+0 (GMT)

N'Goa, sometimes referred to historically as Ama, Oma, or Wema, is a small town and commune in the Cercle of San in the Ségou Region of Mali. As of 1998 the commune had a population of 7,172.

== History ==
N'Goa was the seat of a kingdom, a subdivision of the historical province of Bendugu, led by a cadet branch from nearby Daa. The king played a prominent role in encouraging the Mansa (title) of the Mali Empire to attack Djenne in 1599. After their subsequent defeat, N'Goa was ravaged by the armies of the Pashalik of Timbuktu. N'Goa later joined in Djenne's rebellion against the Pashalik in 1632.
