= Heremakono =

Heremakono may refer to:

- Waiting for Happiness - a Mauritanian film
- Heremakono, Mali
- an alternative spelling of Hérémakonon, a town in Guinea
