= Cy =

Cy, CY, or cy may refer to:

== People ==
- Cy (given name)

== Fictional characters ==
- Cy, a Cylon in the final episode ("The Return of Starbuck") of the television series Galactica 1980
- Cy the Cardinal, mascot of Iowa State University
- Cy, mascot of the Pee Dee Cyclones minor league ice hockey team based in Winston-Salem, North Carolina
- Cy, O'Hare Air delivery guy from The Lorax movie
- Cy, from the "'Zobooland'" segment of Zoboomafoo

== Codes ==
- Cyprus ISO 3166-1 alpha-2, FIPS Pub 10-4 and obsolete NATO country code
  - .cy, Cyprus Internet country code top-level domain (ccTLD)
- Cyprus Airways IATA airline designator
- Cymraeg, otherwise known as the Welsh language ISO 639-1 language code

== In science and technology ==
- Cubic yard
- In BIOS setup, number of cylinders in cylinder-head-sector (CHS) hard disk drive access method
- Cyclohexyl group, in organic chemistry
- Cyclophosphamide, an alkylating agent used in therapy for cancer and some autoimmune diseases
- Samokhodnaya Ustanovka (Russian: самоходная установка), a range of Soviet self-propelled carriages
- Cypress Semiconductor (NASDAQ stock symbol)
- Cy, a code for cyanine dyes

== Other uses ==
- Calendar year
- Common year
- Common Year (Greyhawk)
- Chandrayaan programme

== See also ==
- C. Y. Leung Chun-ying (born 1954), Chief Executive of the Hong Kong Special Administrative Region
- CCY, IATA code and FAA LID for Northeast Iowa Regional Airport
- Cy Young Award, an annual award for baseball pitchers named after the pitcher Cy Young
- Sy (disambiguation)
