= Nianasso =

- Village
- Country: Mali
- Region: Ségou Region
- Cercle: San Cercle
- Commune: Kassarola
- Time zone: UTC+0 (GMT)

Nianasso is a village and seat of the Commune of Kassarola, in the Cercle of San in the Ségou Region of southern-central Mali.
