= Ouolon =

Coordinates: 13°29′18″N 4°50′45″W

- Commune and town
- Interactive map of Ouolon
- Country: Mali
- Region: Ségou Region
- Cercle: San Cercle
- Elevation: 890 ft (270 m)

Population (1998)
  - Total: 9,278
- Time zone: UTC+0 (GMT)

Ouolon is a small town and commune in the Cercle of San in the Ségou Region of Mali. In 1998 the commune had a population of 9,278.
