= N'Torosso =

- Commune and town
- Location in Mali
- Coordinates: 12°19′N 4°57′W
- Country: Mali
- Region: Ségou Region
- Cercle: San Cercle

Population (1998)
  - Total: 9,863
- Time zone: UTC+0 (GMT)

N'Torosso or N'Torosso Bolokalasso is a small town and commune in the Cercle of San in the Ségou Region of Mali. As of 1998 the commune had a population of 9,863.
