= Heremakono, Mali =

Heremakono
- Village
- Country: Mali
- Region: Ségou Region
- Cercle: San Cercle
- Commune: Kava
- Time zone: UTC+0 (GMT)

Heremakono is a village and seat of the commune of Mali in the San Cercle in the Ségou Region of southern-central Mali.
