= Cy Kuckenbaker =

American filmmaker

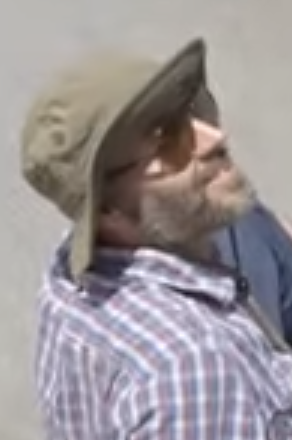
- Kuckenbacker in 2014
- Education: California Institute of the Arts; San Diego State University
- Occupations: Filmmaker; video artist; professor
- Years active: 2000–present
- Known for: Tiger Oak + Echo; Bush League; The Potato Eater
- Awards: 2004 Fulbright Fellowship recipient

Cy Kuckenbaker is an American filmmaker, video artist and professor known for Tiger Oak + Echo (2018), Bush League (2010), The Potato Eater (2003) and his viral "time collapse" edits of planes and traffic in San Diego, United States.

== Life and career ==
Kuckenbaker is from Alaska and briefly attended college in South Dakota. He moved to Hillcrest in 1993, and graduated from San Diego State University in 1998. Kuckenbaker made the film Tiger Oak + Echo after serving as a Peace Corps volunteer in Kupiškis, Lithuania from 2000-2002. He was the recipient of a Fulbright Fellowship in 2004 and received a Master of Fine Arts at California Institute of the Arts in 2006. Kuckenbaker has been a professor at San Diego City College since 2010.

In 2013, Kuckenbaker partnered with the Museum of Photographic Arts through the Creative Catalyst Grant from the San Diego Foundation to produce a series of videos stemming off his viral content and creative edits of traffic, planes and everyday life in San Diego. After relocating near San Diego International Airport, he said the planes were recorded on Black Friday, November 23, 2012, between 10:30am and 3pm, following inspiration from a composite photo at Hannover Airport by Ho-Yeol Ryu. Kuckenbaker said it took approximately 2 hours of editing for every 1 second of finished video rendering and that he had to composite additional time lapse footage over the render to give the illusion that time was passing. He recorded 462 cars over 4 minutes from the Washington Street bridge overlooking SR-163 on October 1, 2013.

== Filmography ==
Year	Title	Notes
2003	The Potato Eater	
2010	Bush League	
2018	Tiger Oak + Echo	

Accolades
List of awards and nominations
Event	Year	Award	Title	Result	Ref.
GI Film Festival San Diego	2021	Local Film Showcase – Best Short	Tiger Oak + Echo	Nominated	
