= California State Route 52 =

Highway in California

State Route 52
- State Route 52 highlighted in red

Route information
- Maintained by Caltrans
- Length: 17.222 mi (27.716 km)
- Existed: 1964–present
- Tourist routes: SR 52 through Mission Trails Regional Park

Major junctions
- West end: I-5 in San Diego
- I-805 in San Diego; SR 163 in San Diego; I-15 in San Diego; SR 125 in Santee
- East end: SR 67 in Santee

Location
- Country: United States
- State: California
- Counties: San Diego

Highway system
- State highways in California; Interstate; US; State; Scenic; History; Pre‑1964; Unconstructed; Deleted; Freeways
← SR 51	→ SR 53

State Route 52 (SR 52) is a state highway in San Diego County, California, United States. It extends from La Jolla Parkway at Interstate 5 (I-5) in La Jolla, San Diego, to SR 67 in Santee. It is a freeway for its entire length and serves as a major east–west route through the northern part of the city of San Diego. The road connects the major north–south freeways of the county, including I-5, I-805, SR 163, I-15, SR 125, and SR 67. SR 52 passes north of the Rose Canyon Fault before traversing Marine Corps Air Station Miramar (MCAS Miramar). East of Santo Road and west of SR 125, the highway goes through Mission Trails Regional Park, a large open preserve. SR 52 is also known as the Soledad Freeway and the San Clemente Canyon Freeway.

Plans for a route between La Jolla and Santee date from 1959, and SR 52 was officially designated in the 1964 state highway renumbering. Construction began in 1966 at the I-5 interchange with Ardath Road leading to La Jolla. It continued with the construction of San Clemente Canyon Road, which was later widened to become SR 52. The freeway was completed east to I-805 in 1970, and was built in two stages from there to Santo Road east of I-15; the last phase was completed in 1988.

The freeway east of Santo Road encountered delays from environmentalists over the endangered least Bell's vireo, a songbird which faced habitat destruction, as well as those concerned with the destruction of homes and businesses for the freeway right-of-way. The extension to Mission Gorge Road opened in 1993, and SR 52 was completed to SR 125 in 1998. Funding issues delayed the completion of the entire route until 2011, more than fifty years after construction began; until then, the city of Santee faced traffic snarls. A widening project was completed in 2007 between Santo Road and Mast Boulevard; further expansion has been put on hold due to state budget concerns.

== Route description ==
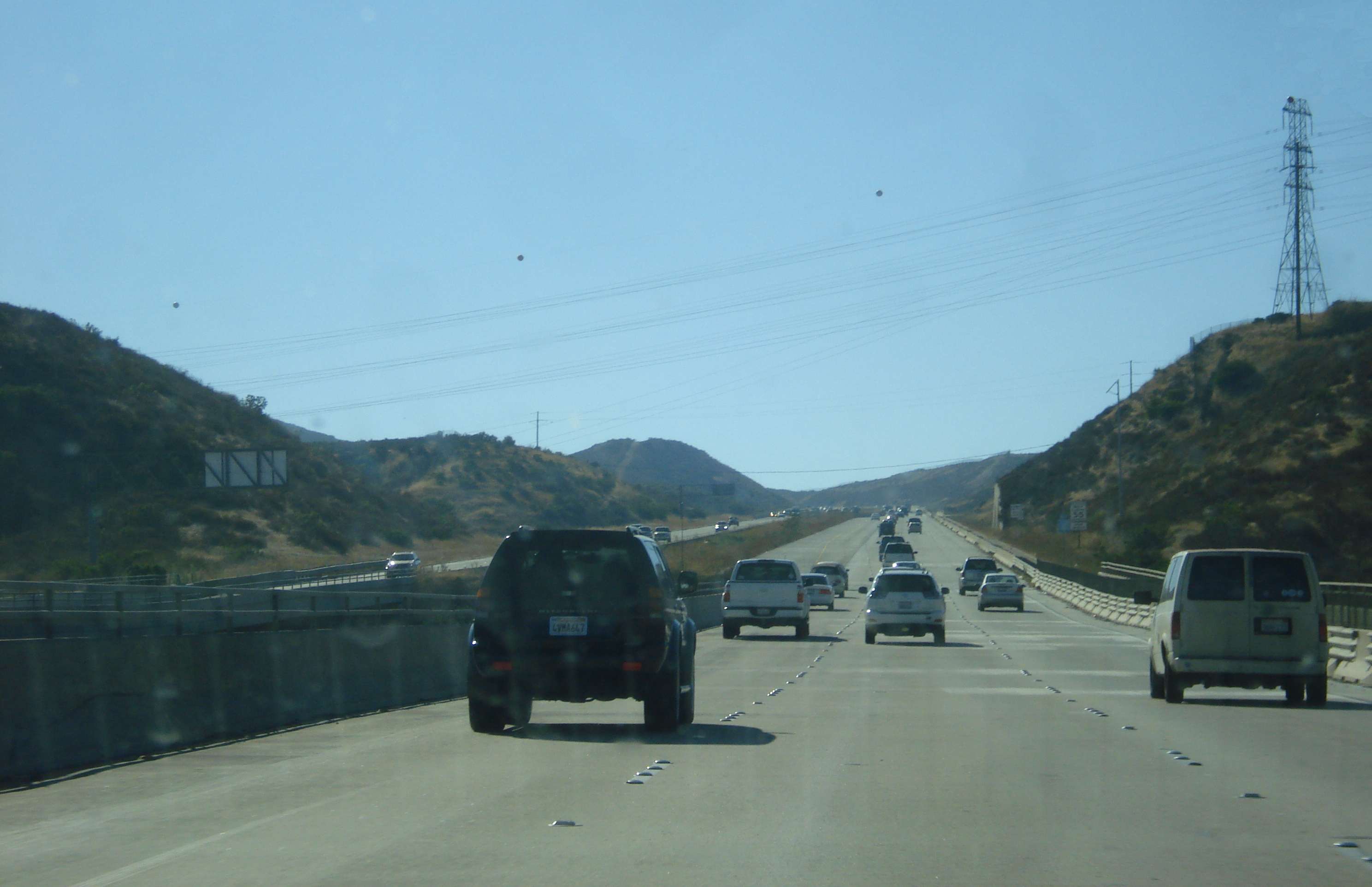
SR 52 westbound heading towards I-15

Route 52 is defined in section 352 of the California Streets and Highways Code, and that the highway is "from Route 5 east of La Jolla to Route 67 near Santee".

SR 52 begins just west of I-5 at the eastern end of La Jolla Parkway. Before entering San Clemente Canyon, part of Marian Bear Natural Park, the road becomes a freeway as it intersects I-5. The freeway runs north of the Rose Canyon Fault, composed of Late Cretaceous rock estimated to be 90 million years old, and Mount Soledad. Following exits with Clairemont Mesa Boulevard / Regents Road and Genesee Avenue, SR 52 intersects I-805 before exiting the canyon and traveling along the southern edge of the MCAS Miramar military base.

From I-805 to SR 163, the highway goes through an area with visible Pliocene sedimentary rocks estimated to be 10 million years old. After passing the Miramar Recycling Center and an interchange with Convoy Street, SR 52 intersects SR 163, a freeway heading towards downtown San Diego. SR 52 intersects Kearny Villa Road before an interchange with I-15. A collector/distributor road serves these three interchanges.

After this interchange, the freeway leaves the edge of the military base and enters the San Diego neighborhood of Tierrasanta, where there is a junction with Santo Road, before traversing Mission Trails Regional Park, an open space preserve, for a few miles. The freeway ascends to Mission Trails Pass, north of the 1,230-foot (370 m) summit of Fortuna Mountain. The mountain is part of the Peninsular Range; the highway cuts through Eocene rocks estimated to be 50 million years old and marine fossils. The road on the eastern side of the mountain is carved out of "igneous granitic rocks" that are thought to be 150 million years old, an unusual formation compared to the Eocene layer.

A dedicated two-way bicycle path exists on the northern side of the roadway between Santo Road and Mast Boulevard, with access possible from both termini. East of the Mast Boulevard interchange, SR 52 crosses and begins to parallel the San Diego River. The freeway enters the city of Santee, where SR 52 was built alongside Mission Gorge Road. SR 52 intersects the northern end of SR 125, where SR 52 traffic can exit south onto SR 125. The freeway continues east through Santee, with interchanges at Fanita Drive, Cuyamaca Street, and Magnolia Avenue, before it comes to an end at SR 67.

SR 52 is part of the California Freeway and Expressway System and is eligible for the State Scenic Highway System. In 2016, Caltrans officially designated the segment adjacent to Mission Trails Regional Park between Santo Road and Mast Boulevard as a scenic highway. SR 52 is also part of the National Highway System, a network of highways that are considered essential to the country's economy, defense, and mobility by the Federal Highway Administration. The entire route is known as both the Soledad Freeway and the San Clemente Canyon Freeway. In 2013, SR 52 had an annual average daily traffic (AADT) of 69,000 at the eastern terminus with SR 67, and 103,000 between Convoy Street and SR 163, the lowest and the highest AADT for the highway, respectively.

== History ==
SR 52 construction history

In 1959, Legislative Route 279 was designated as a highway from La Jolla to Santee and incorporated into the California Freeway and Expressway System. In the 1964 state highway renumbering, this became SR 52. However, SR 52 took more than fifty years to be constructed, due to delays in the planning and construction phases.

=== I-5 to I-805 ===
A public hearing on Legislative Route 279 and on the Ardath Road connection to La Jolla was held on November 15, 1961. At the hearing, there were concerns expressed regarding destruction of vegetation. City and state officials indicated that the Soledad Freeway would be constructed in the northern part of the canyon to minimize environmental damage. On November 9, 1966, the I-5 interchange with Ardath Road opened at the western end of what would become SR 52. The original goal was to connect the interchange with San Clemente Canyon Road, which served as a predecessor to SR 52; plans were to widen the road to four lanes and designate it as SR 52. The connecting ramps were not opened that day because the aluminum guard rails had not been delivered on time. Estimates indicated that each resident of La Jolla would save 80 hours per year by using Ardath Road. A ramp from southbound I-5 to westbound Ardath Road was never completed because of a hairpin turn that would be necessary due to the towering cliff on the west side of I-5 that Ardath Road ascends as it continues to La Jolla. On November 18, San Clemente Canyon Road was connected to I-5 when the aluminum guard rails arrived and were subsequently installed. San Clemente Canyon Road was not fully opened until 1967. That year, citizens expressed opposition to the construction of the Soledad Freeway because some wanted the land to be used for a park, and did not view the freeway as "necessary."

Formal bids began in February 1969 for the first section of SR 52 between I-5 and I-805. The state ordered the construction of this section on April 28, 1969. On Thursday, May 28, 1970, the Soledad Freeway opened, connecting Regents Road and Genesee Avenue with I-5; however, it did not connect to the unopened I-805. The road was built by Kasler, Ball and Yeager for $3.9 million (about $24.2 million in 2024 dollars). The construction firm deposited dirt into "an unnamed finger canyon" against the conditions of the city permit, and the city ordered the firm to remove it. The section of I-805 from SR 52 to El Cajon Boulevard was scheduled to be dedicated on March 20, 1972.

Ardath Road was renamed La Jolla Parkway on October 15, 2002, for two reasons: a nearby residential street was also named Ardath Road, and there was a desire to draw attention to this primary route to downtown La Jolla. This required the city of San Diego to pay $20,000 (about $33,000 in 2024 dollars) to replace the signs on SR 52.

=== I-805 to Santo Road ===
The second phase of SR 52 from I-805 to 1.1 miles (1.8 km) past U.S. Route 395 (which became I-15 in 1974) was projected to cost $29.4 million (about $183 million in 2024 dollars). The new freeway was to provide access to Tierrasanta and reduce the traffic on I-8. The U.S. Navy was consulted in the planning process due to the road's proposed routing through what was then NAS Miramar that would provide a delineation against further urban development. There were no concerns expressed at the public hearing on November 17, 1970; however, construction did not begin for more than ten years, as California governor Jerry Brown stalled the construction of SR 52 from Santo Road to SR 67. In 1977, the county supervisor, a San Diego City councilman, and the mayors of La Mesa and National City wrote a letter to Brown to ask for the construction of this portion of SR 125 and other freeways, due to concerns about the types of congestion seen in Los Angeles coming to San Diego due to the incomplete freeway system. San Diego City Councilman Tom Gade wrote a telegram to Caltrans Director Adriana Gianturco about the possible deletions; in response, Gianturco clarified that the plans were only being reconsidered and had not been removed, and a CHC member criticized the tone of the original telegram, calling it "intemperate". In 1984, Leo Trombatore, the Caltrans Director under California governor George Deukmejian, requested to the California Transportation Commission (CTC) that "formal studies toward this end be initiated immediately. Route 52 has a high statewide priority." The CTC followed the director's wishes, approving the studies.

The first part of this phase, from I-805 to Convoy Street, began construction in December 1986. It was dedicated at a community celebration on July 11, 1987, and was scheduled to open to traffic a few weeks later. The first callboxes in San Diego County were installed on SR 52 near Convoy Street on June 20, 1988. On June 30, 1988, SR 52 from Convoy Street to Santo Road opened to traffic. The I-15 interchange was built with state funds from the CTC.

In 2000, Hazard Construction Company added a single westbound lane on SR 52 from SR 163 to I-805, a distance of 2.5 miles (4.0 km), at a cost of $1.7 million (about $2.93 million in 2024 dollars). In 2006, the Metropolitan Transit System, in cooperation with the San Diego Association of Governments (SANDAG), Caltrans, and the California Highway Patrol, began a pilot program to run transit buses along the shoulders of SR 52 between Kearny Villa Road and I-805. During rush hour, buses were able to use these shoulders to bypass slow traffic in the main lanes. The trial was considered successful as more than 99 percent of trips arrived on time, customer feedback was favorable and no safety concerns were encountered. On May 9, 2007, The San Diego Union-Tribune published a story which raised reader concerns about a dangerous dip in the freeway. The dip had developed in a section of the highway constructed on top of the Miramar Landfill, and had been caused by trash settling; it was repaired by the next day.

=== Planning for eastern portion ===
The planning process for the remainder of SR 52 began as early as 1970, when the initial plan was to route the freeway through the city of Santee along Mission Gorge Road and the San Diego River. Planning was delayed until 1984, along with the construction of the I-805 to Santo Road segment. The City of Santee opposed the original plans, hoping to route the freeway on Prospect Avenue or north of the San Diego River. By April 1985, a second route along Prospect Avenue, proposed by Caltrans, earned the support of the City Council; however, the required demolition of many small businesses led many of those affected to start a petition against this route. On the other hand, there were objections about the "river route" costing approximately $15 million more (about $37 million in 2024 dollars) and cutting through a future "Town Center development". The Lakeside Chamber of Commerce preferred the route along the San Diego River, citing the proximity to that city. The environmental impact report was found to be deficient by the Federal Highway Administration in late 1986.

In January 1987, the Santee City Council voted to commence a study of a more northern route, even though local residents and workers objected that this would postpone construction. In March, the study, done by BSI Inc., supported the Caltrans decision to abandon plans for the northern path due to the increased cost from the "mountainous, undeveloped" terrain. The council voted to support a southern alignment through the town, with both the Prospect Avenue and San Diego River alternatives still viable. In the same month, the mayor of La Mesa, Fred Nagel, started a petition drive supporting the extension of the freeway due to the recurring traffic on I-8. The Caltrans environmental impact report indicated that the Prospect Avenue route would cost $89 million (about $210 million in 2024 dollars), compared to the river route's $121 million (about $286 million in 2024 dollars). The city council of El Cajon publicly supported the Prospect Avenue routing; however, some employees of the City of Santee, including some city planners and engineers, were concerned that portions of the report were "outdated." The petitions were given to the CTC in May, when San Diego officials made several arguments in support of the construction.

In June 1987, the CTC staff initially recommended against allocating money for the SR 52 segment; however, SANDAG agreed to fund the project with $1 million (about $2.36 million in 2024 dollars). Residents of Santee opposed the possible routes through the city at a public forum on June 10 because of the necessary destruction of homes to build on those routes. In late June, Caltrans considered making small modifications to the Prospect Avenue alignment to destroy fewer homes, including those in mobile home parks. On June 25, 1987, the CTC voted to support the SR 52 extension, with the requirement that $4.8 million (about $11.3 million in 2024 dollars) come from local funding sources. Finally, on September 23, the City of Santee recommended the Prospect Avenue Route to the CTC.

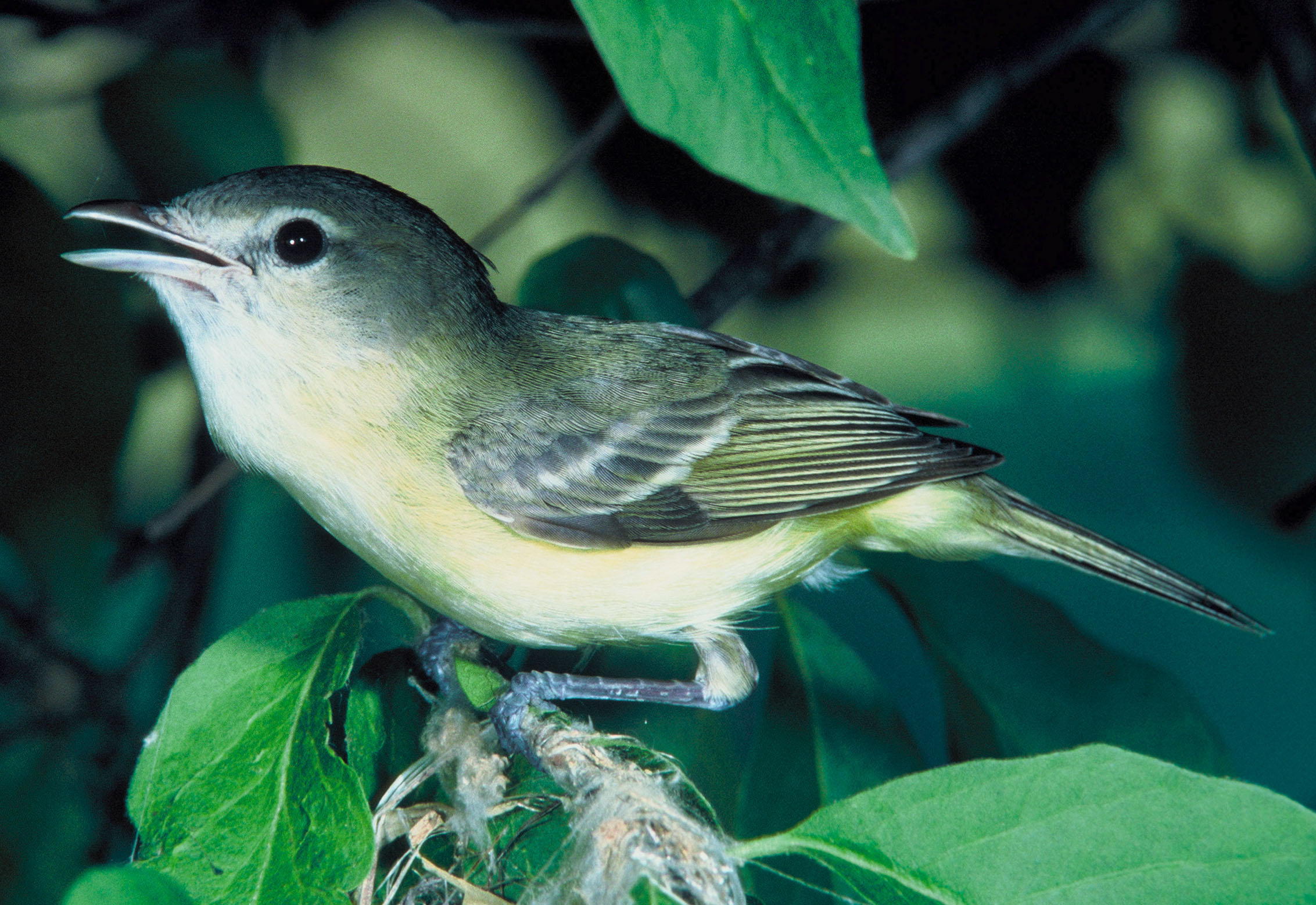
A Bell's vireo, of which the least Bell's vireo is a subspecies

In July 1987, the U.S. Fish and Wildlife Service expressed concerns that construction near the San Diego River crossing might result in the destruction of the endangered least Bell's vireo habitat. Two of the four alternative routes considered by Caltrans passed through the Carlton Hills golf course, which the public opposed. In April 1988, the Sierra Club denounced the Prospect Avenue route; federal negotiators recommended shifting the route from Hollins Lake towards the golf course. Environmental concerns raised in June 1988 related to the least Bell's vireo included decrease of insects, a darker environment after overpasses are constructed, and the fragmenting of habitat. Nevertheless, Caltrans still desired the Prospect Avenue route over concerns of a more expensive and less traveled northern route. Upset because of the delays, the Santee City Council wrote to U.S. senators Pete Wilson and Alan Cranston, asking for their assistance. Councilman Jim Bartell alleged that the issue would affect the city council elections.

In March 1989, the Fish and Wildlife Service agreed to the project, on the conditions of altering the route to cross the San Diego River and pass east of the center of the town, and constructing 44 acres of additional habitat as mitigation. SANDAG voted against building a full bicycle lane along the route in July 1989, citing the high costs. Finally, on July 27, the final routing of SR 52 was determined, running along Prospect Avenue. In May 1990, Santee councilman Roy Woodward was censured for having a conflict of interest in voting to support the proposals for the freeway because he "held interests" in three properties that would benefit from the freeway, thus violating the Political Reform Act as these interests exceeded $10,000. One of the holdings was near Cuyamaca Street, the location of an offramp on a path that he voted to support. He was fined $2,000 (about $4,200 in 2024 dollars) for each property, for a total of $6,000 (about $12,700 in 2024 dollars).

=== Santo Road to Mission Gorge Road ===
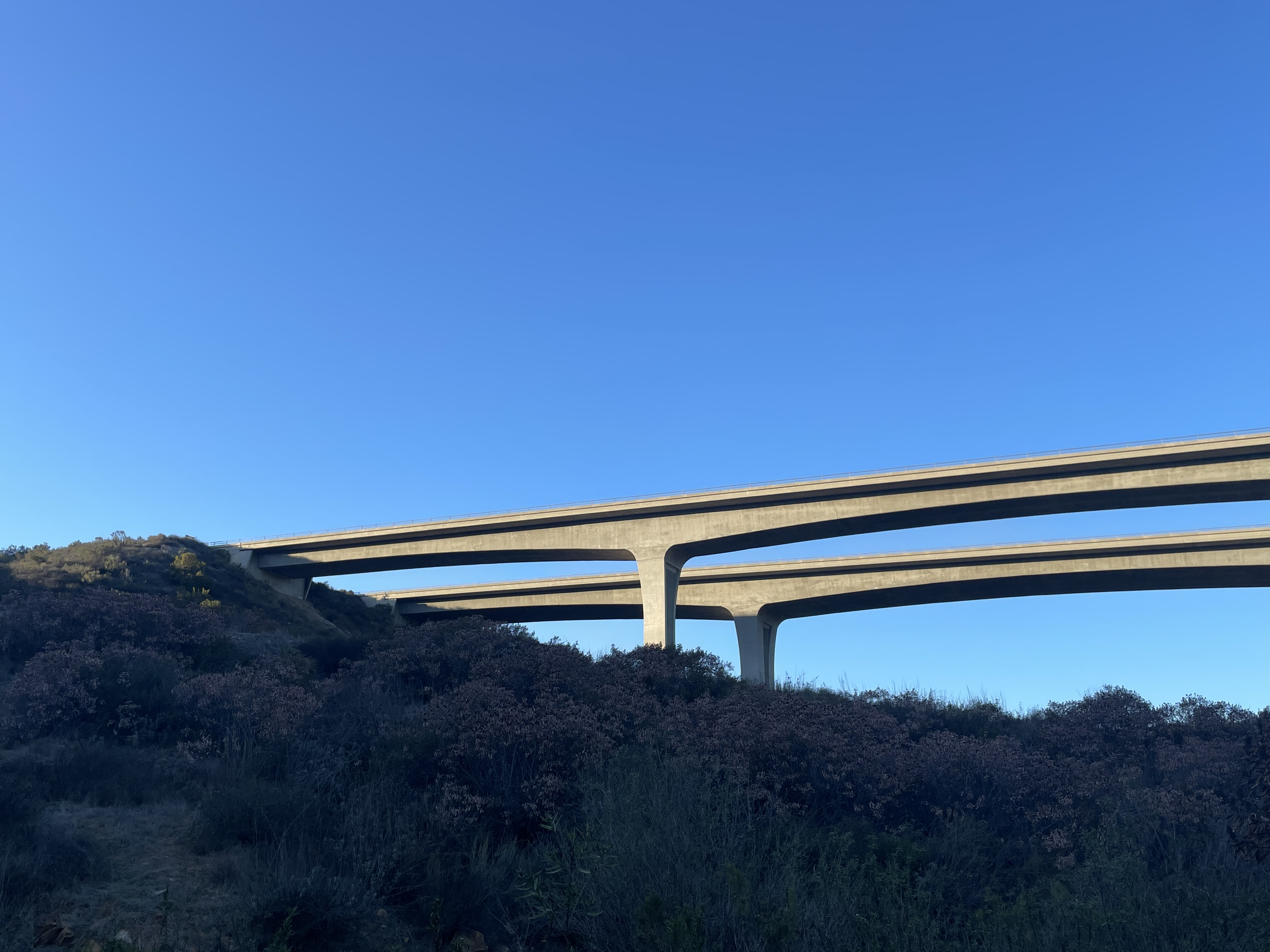
SR 52 crossing a canyon in Mission Trails Regional Park

In April 1990, the Santee City Council agreed to begin purchasing land, over the environmental concerns of Councilman Jim Bartell. Construction finally began on the four-lane section of SR 52 between Santo Road and Mission Gorge Road on July 19, 1991. The work was projected to cost $52 million (about $106 million in 2024 dollars). For environmental mitigation, a new 45-acre (0.070 sq mi) songbird habitat was constructed that cost $8.3 million (about $17 million in 2024 dollars). Fossils of "small foraging mammals" were discovered during construction in late 1991. The construction company, HDB Construction, was required to keep noise below 61 decibels to protect the birds. The project was funded primarily with revenue from a voter-approved sales tax in 1987. The opening of this portion was scheduled for December 16, 1993. This new segment ended just southeast of the Mast Boulevard interchange, after the San Diego River overpass.

The opening of this stretch of SR 52 had many effects on the transportation of the East County region. Traffic decreased significantly on I-8 in early 1994, with an estimated 30,000 commuters switching from I-8 to SR 52. Fewer cars traveled on the western part of Mission Gorge Road, leading to a decrease in revenue for businesses located along that road. On Mast Boulevard and Mission Gorge Road in Santee, much more traffic was present, leading to residents complaining to the city. In 1998, the city began to widen Mission Gorge Road between Carlton Hills Drive and Fanita Road to handle the extra traffic from the incomplete SR 52.

The year after the September 11, 2001 attacks, the military erected a fence to block a deer tunnel underneath the freeway that connected the base and Mission Trails Regional Park, since the tunnel could be used to gain unauthorized access to the base. In 2006, construction began to add a third lane on westbound SR 52 between Mast Boulevard and Santo Road. The expansion cost $3.4 million (about $5.07 million in 2024 dollars) and was funded by the state and the county TransNet sales tax. The new lane opened on May 8, 2007; however, the widening generated complaints from angry commuters facing a "bottleneck" at Santo Road. Because the additional lane was constructed in portions, the opening of the third lane between Santo Road and the existing third lane closer to I-15 was delayed; however, construction for the missing 2,100 feet (640 m) was approved in April 2007. The extension opened on July 20, 2007.

=== Mission Gorge Road to SR 67 ===
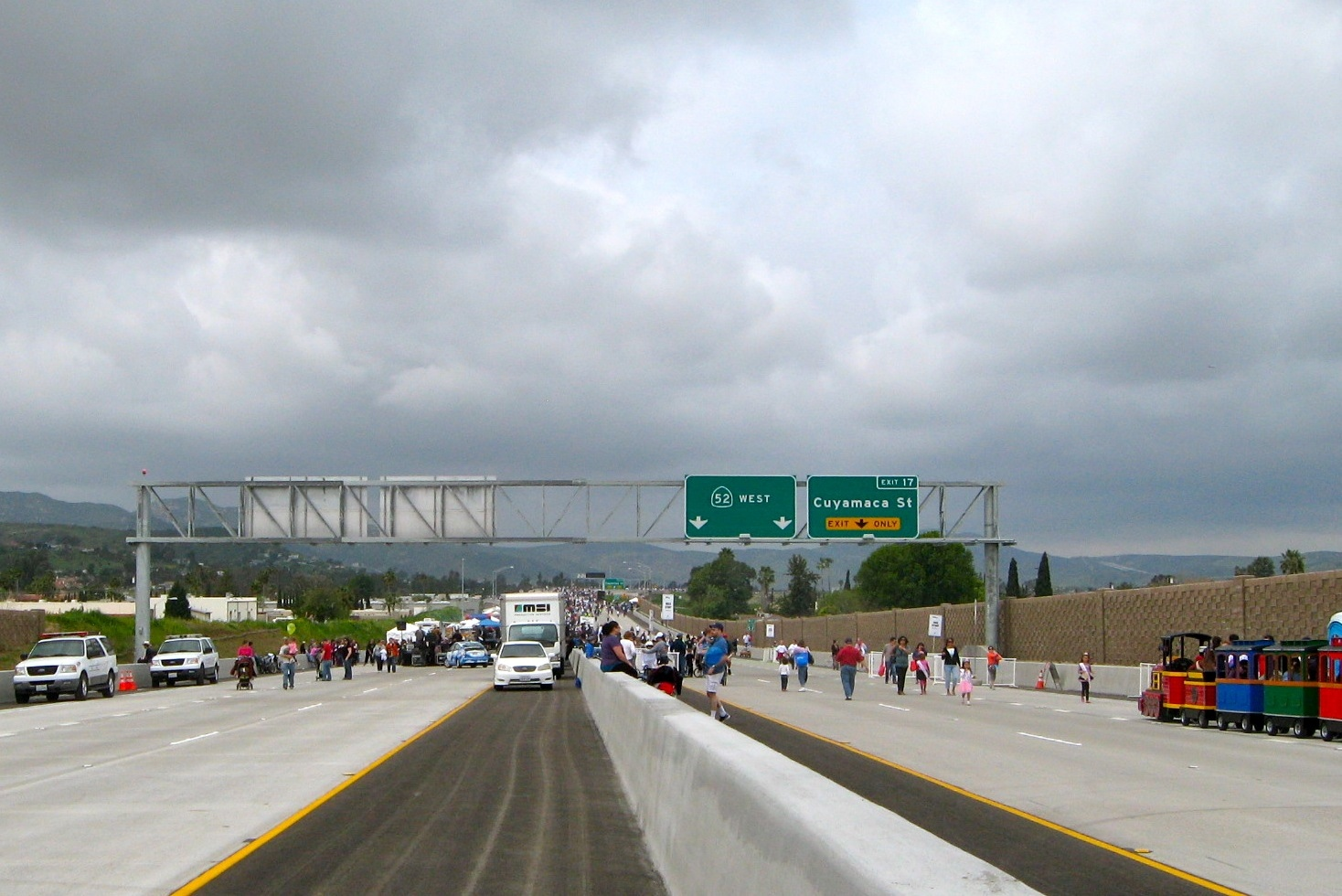
Opening celebration on March 19, 2011

Construction on the next portion of SR 52, from Mission Gorge Road to SR 125, was scheduled to begin in late 1995, at a total cost of $60 million (about $112 million in 2024 dollars) for the entire project. Property acquisition began in 1994, with many property owners along the south side of Mission Gorge Road being forced to move out of the way of the freeway and subsequent road construction, as Mission Gorge Road was moved south to accommodate the new freeway. About $40 million ($75 million in 2024 dollars) was spent on the property acquisition. After weather-related construction delays due to the El Niño season of the winter of 1997–1998, the extension of SR 52 between Mission Gorge Road and SR 125 was dedicated on May 9, 1998. The eastbound lanes were scheduled to be opened a few days later, and the westbound lanes were to be opened in mid-July of that year. L.R. Hubbard Construction Company built the portion for $17 million (about $30.4 million in 2024 dollars).

The City of Santee faced problems in the construction of the freeway from SR 125 to SR 67. As early as 1995, it was clear that the environmental impact report was delayed and that there would be funding difficulties. SANDAG allocated $23 million dollars (about $40.6 million in 2024 dollars) in 1999 to purchase properties needed for the right-of-way. In 2001, SANDAG gave $138 million (about $233 million in 2024 dollars) to the expansion of SR 52 to SR 67, which was necessary for extending the freeway past Cuyamaca Street. But by 2003, the transportation committee of SANDAG voted to delay the project due to decreased state funding. The City of Santee was required to make improvements to Forester Creek to accommodate potential flooding, which cost $30 million (about $46.2 million in 2024 dollars); the work began in May 2006. Funding issues were finally resolved in 2006 with voter-approved statewide transportation bonds. In 2007, highway construction costs increased; that year, the SANDAG transportation committee voted to fund the construction, taking money from a planned reversible lanes project on SR 52.

"Heavy construction" of SR 52 from SR 125 eastward to SR 67 began in February 2008. More than 360 properties were acquired to build the freeway; at least 60 were mobile homes. This portion was divided into three construction projects: from SR 125 to Cuyamaca Street, from there to Magnolia Avenue, and the interchange with SR 67, which began construction in mid-June 2008. The middle project had to be shut down briefly in February 2009 due to funding issues. Completion was scheduled for 2010, but was postponed to early 2011 due to weather-related delays. This new portion was opened to traffic on March 29, 2011. The cost of this project was $525 million, funded with state and federal funds as well as TransNet revenue. The opening was predicted to reduce traffic on I-8 as well as Mission Gorge Road and other Santee thoroughfares. The official "ribbon cutting" ceremony took place on March 19, 2011 on the freeway at the Cuyamaca Street interchange.

Reactions to the extension between SR 125 and SR 67 were mixed. There were reports of faster transportation through the East County area, yet commuters noted a rush hour backup at SR 125 headed westbound because there were only two lanes traveling west through the interchange. Traffic along Mission Gorge Road was reported to have decreased by 20 percent.

== Future ==
There are plans to add one lane in each direction, as well as two reversible lanes, from I-15 to SR 125. These plans were put on hold in 2008 due to a budget shortfall. Completion is scheduled to take place by 2040. Caltrans recommends adding two more lanes between I-5 and I-805, and two HOV lanes between I-805 and I-15.

== Exit list ==
The entire route is in San Diego County.

Location	mi	km	Exit	Destinations	Notes
San Diego	0.00	0.00		La Jolla Parkway	Continuation beyond I-5; formerly Ardath Road
San Diego	0.32	0.51	1A	I-5 (San Diego Freeway) – Los Angeles, Downtown San Diego	No exit number eastbound; no access from SR 52 east to I-5 north; west end of SR 52; I-5 north exit 26B, south exit 26
San Diego	1.35	2.17	1B	Clairemont Mesa Boulevard, Regents Road	Signed as exit 1 eastbound
San Diego	2.30	3.70	2	Genesee Avenue	
San Diego	3.44	5.54	3	I-805 (Jacob Dekema Freeway) – Los Angeles, National City, Chula Vista	I-805 exit 23
San Diego	5.49	8.84	5	Convoy Street	
San Diego	6.28	10.11	6	SR 163 south (Cabrillo Freeway)	No access to SR 163 north; SR 163 north exits 9A-B; SR 163 south exit 9 to SR 52 west only
San Diego	6.93	11.15	7	I-15 (Escondido Freeway) / Kearny Villa Road	I-15 exit 11
San Diego	8.39	13.50	8	Santo Road	
San Diego	13.28	21.37	13	Mast Boulevard	
Santee	14.81	23.83	14	Mission Gorge Road	Eastbound exit and westbound entrance
Santee	14.92	24.01	15A	SR 125 south	Signed as exit 15 eastbound; SR 125 exit 21
Santee	15.13	24.35	15B	Fanita Drive	Westbound exit and eastbound entrance
Santee	16.17	26.02	17	Cuyamaca Street	No access to southbound Cuyamaca Street from westbound exit
Santee	17.27	27.79	18A	Magnolia Avenue	Eastbound exit and westbound entrance
Santee	17.27	27.79	18B–C	SR 67 (San Vicente Freeway) – El Cajon, Ramona	Signed as exits 18B (south) and 18C (north); east end of SR 52; SR 67 exit 2
1.000 mi = 1.609 km; 1.000 km = 0.621 mi: Incomplete access

== See also ==
- San Clemente Canyon—Marian Bear Memorial Park
- Roads in San Diego County, California
