= Djeguena =

Coordinates: 13°12′01″N 5°07′47″W

- Commune and town
- Interactive map of Djeguena
- Country: Mali
- Region: Ségou Region
- Cercle: San Cercle

Population (1998)
  - Total: 5,162
- Time zone: UTC+0 (GMT)

Djeguena is a small town and commune in the Cercle of San in the Ségou Region of Mali. In 1998, the commune had a population of 5,162.
