= Dieli =

- Commune and town
- Location in Mali
- Coordinates: 13°4′N 5°7′W
- Country: Mali
- Region: Ségou Region
- Cercle: San Cercle

Population (1998)
  - Total: 12,593
- Time zone: UTC+0 (GMT)

Dieli or Dieli Felinso is a small town and commune in the Cercle of San in the Ségou Region of Mali. In 1998 the commune had a population of 12,593.
