= Tourakolomba =

Coordinates: 12°45′50″N 5°02′51″W

- Commune and town
- Interactive map of Tourakolomba
- Country: Mali
- Region: Ségou Region
- Cercle: San Cercle

Population (1998)
  - Total: 5,446
- Time zone: UTC+0 (GMT)

Tourakolomba is a small town and commune in the Cercle of San in the Ségou Region of Mali. As of 1998 the commune had a population of 5,446.
