= Waki, Mali =

Coordinates: 12°50′22″N 4°49′14″W

Waki
- Commune and town
- Interactive map of Waki
- Country: Mali
- Region: Ségou Region
- Cercle: San Cercle

Population (1998)
  - Total: 6,167
- Time zone: UTC+0 (GMT)

Waki is a small town and commune in the Cercle of San in the Ségou Region of Mali. As of 1998 the commune had a population of 6,167.
