= Niamana, Ségou =

Coordinates: 13°02′03″N 5°11′50″W

Niamana
- Commune and town
- Interactive map of Niamana
- Country: Mali
- Region: Ségou Region
- Cercle: San Cercle

Population (1998)
  - Total: 5,361
- Time zone: UTC+0 (GMT)

Niamana is a small town and commune in the Cercle of San in the Ségou Region of Mali. In 1998 the commune had a population of 5,361.
