= Cy (given name) =

Cy is a masculine given name, often a short form (hypocorism) of Cyril, Cyrus or Seymour, and a nickname. It may refer to:

== In arts and entertainment ==
- Cy Chadwick (born 1969), English actor, director, producer and presenter
- Seymour Cy Coben (1919–2006), American songwriter
- Cy Coleman (1929–2004), American composer, songwriter and jazz pianist born Seymour Kaufman
- Cy Curnin (born 1957), British singer, songwriter, and musician
- Cyril Cy Endfield (1914–1995), American screenwriter, film and theatre director, author, magician and inventor
- Seymour Cy Feuer (1911–2006), American theatre producer, director, composer and musician
- Cy Gavin (born 1985), American artist
- Cyril Cy Grant (1919–2010), Guyanese actor, musician, writer and poet
- Cyrus Cy Hungerford (1889–1983), American editorial cartoonist
- Cyrus Cy Kendall (1898–1953), American actor
- Cy Kuckenbaker, American filmmaker
- Cyril Cy Laurie (1926–2002), English jazz clarinetist and bandleader
- Seymour Cy Leslie (1922–2008), founder of Pickwick Records and first president and founder of MGM/UA Home Entertainment Group
- Seymour Cy Schindell (1907–1948), American actor
- Cyril Cy Touff (1927–2003), American jazz bass trumpeter
- Edwin Cy Twombly, Jr. (1928–2011), American painter, sculptor and photographer
- Cyril Cy Walter (1915–1968), American café society pianist

== Politicians ==
- Richard Cy LeBlanc (born 1955), Canadian politician
- Cyril Sherwood (1915–1996), Canadian politician
- Cy Thao (born 1972), Laotian-born American politician

== In sport ==
=== Baseball ===
- Cecilio Cy Acosta (born 1946), Mexican former Major League Baseball pitcher
- Frederick Cy Alberts (1882–1917), American Major League Baseball pitcher in 1910
- Eros Cy Barger (1885–1964), American Major League Baseball pitcher
- Clytus Cy Bentley (1850–1873), American Major League Baseball pitcher
- Darrell Cy Blanton (1908–1945), American Major League Baseball pitcher
- Seymour Cy Block (1919–2004), American Major League Baseball player
- Cyril Cy Buker (1918–2011), American Major League Baseball pitcher in 1945
- Arthur Cy Fried (1897–1970), American Major League Baseball pitcher in 1920
- William Cy Moore (1905–1972), American Major League Baseball pitcher
- Harry Cy Morgan (1878–1962), American Major League Baseball pitcher
- Cyril Cy Morgan (1920s pitcher) (1895–1946), American Major League Baseball pitcher
- Ralph Cy Perkins (1896–1963), American Major League Baseball player, coach and manager
- Kenneth Cy Rheam (1893–1947), American baseball player
- James Cy Seymour (1872–1919), American Major League Baseball player and general manager and vice president of the Cleveland Indians
- Cyril Cy Slapnicka (1886–1979), American Major League Baseball pitcher and executive
- Edwin Cy Twombly (baseball) (1897–1974), American Major League Baseball pitcher in 1921
- Henry Cy Vorhees (1874–1910), American Major League Baseball pitcher in 1902
- Wallace Cy Warmoth (1893–1957), American Major League Baseball pitcher
- Frederick Cy Williams (1887–1974), American Major League Baseball player
- Ceylon Cy Wright (1893–1947), American Major League Baseball player in 1916
- Denton Cy Young (1867–1955), American Major League Baseball Hall-of-Fame pitcher

=== Hockey ===
- Cyril Cy Denneny (1891–1970), Canadian National Hockey League player
- Cyril Cy Thomas (1926–2009), Welsh-born National Hockey League player
- Marvin Wentworth (1904–1982), Canadian National Hockey League player

=== Other sports ===
- Cy Alexander (born 1953), American college basketball head coach
- Charles Cy Casper (1912–1968), American National Football League player
- Cy Marshall (1902–1974), American race car driver
- Jack Cy McClairen (1931–2020), American former National Football League player and college football and basketball head coach
- Shirley Cy Wentworth (American football) (1904–1986), American National Football League player
- Burton Cy Williams (American football) (1903–1965), American Football League and National Football League player
- Cy Young (athlete) (1928–2017), American javelin thrower, 1952 Olympic champion
- Harry Young (American football) (1893–1977), American college football and basketball player and head coach, and sprinter, member of the College Football Hall of Fame

== In other fields ==
- Salim L. Lewis (1908–1978), American business executive, managing partner of Bear, Stearns & Company
