= Karaba, Mali =

Coordinates: 12°54′49″N 4°53′34″W

Karaba
- Commune and town
- Interactive map of Karaba
- Country: Mali
- Region: Ségou Region
- Cercle: San Cercle

Population (1998)
  - Total: 10,446
- Time zone: UTC+0 (GMT)

Karaba or Karaba Kagoua is a small town and commune in the Cercle of San in the Ségou Region of Mali. In 1998 the commune had a population of 5,282.
