= Fion =

- Commune and town
- Location in Mali
- Coordinates: 13°22′N 4°20′W
- Country: Mali
- Region: Ségou Region
- Cercle: San Cercle

Population (1998)
  - Total: 5,686
- Time zone: UTC+0 (GMT)

Fion is a small town and commune in the Cercle of San in the Ségou Region of Mali. In 1998 the commune had a population of 5,686.
