= Kaniegue =

Coordinates: 12°56′24″N 5°34′49″W

- Commune
- Interactive map of Kaniegue
- Country: Mali
- Region: Ségou Region
- Cercle: San Cercle

Population (1998)
  - Total: 5,559
- Time zone: UTC+0 (GMT)

Kaniegue is a commune in the Cercle of San in the Ségou Region of Mali. The principal town lies at Dioundiou Konkankan. As of 1998 the commune had a population of 5,559.
