= Sourountouna =

Coordinates: 13°04′N 4°54′W

- Commune and town
- Interactive map of Sourountouna
- Country: Mali
- Region: Ségou Region
- Cercle: San Cercle
- Elevation: 988 ft (301 m)

Population (1998)
  - Total: 11,107
- Time zone: UTC+0 (GMT)

Sourountouna is a small town and commune in the Cercle of San in the Ségou Region of Mali. As of 1998 the commune had a population of 11,107.
