= Siadougou =

Coordinates: 13°33′31″N 5°08′15″W

- Commune
- Interactive map of Siadougou
- Country: Mali
- Region: Ségou Region
- Cercle: San Cercle

Population (1998)
  - Total: 10,294
- Time zone: UTC+0 (GMT)

Siadougou is a commune in the Cercle of San in the Ségou Region of Mali. The principal town lies at Siella. In 1998 the commune had a population of 10,294.
