= Kava, Mali =

Coordinates: 12.8403°N 4.9200°W

Kava
- Commune
- Interactive map of Kava
- Country: Mali
- Region: Ségou Region
- Cercle: San Cercle

Population (1998)
  - Total: 10,699
- Time zone: UTC+0 (GMT)

Kava is a commune in the Cercle of San in the Ségou Region of Mali. The principal town lies at Heremakono. As of 1998 the commune had a population of 10,699.
