= California State Route 163 =

State highway in California

State Route 163
- Cabrillo Freeway
- SR 163 highlighted in red

Route information
- Maintained by Caltrans
- Length: 11.088 mi (17.844 km)
- History: 1948 as US 395, 1969 as SR 163
- Tourist routes: Cabrillo Parkway through Balboa Park

Major junctions
- South end: I-5 in San Diego
- I-8 in San Diego; I-805 in San Diego; SR 52 in San Diego
- North end: I-15 in San Diego

Location
- Country: United States
- State: California
- Counties: San Diego

Highway system
- State highways in California; Interstate; US; State; Scenic; History; Pre‑1964; Unconstructed; Deleted; Freeways
| ← SR 162 | → SR 164 |

State Route 163 (SR 163), or the Cabrillo Freeway, is a state highway in San Diego, California. The 11.088-mile (17.844 km) stretch of the former US 395 freeway runs from downtown San Diego just south of an interchange with Interstate 5 (I-5), extending north through historic Balboa Park and various neighborhoods of San Diego to an interchange with I-15 in the neighborhood of Miramar. The freeway is named after Juan Rodríguez Cabrillo, the first European to navigate the coast of present-day California.

The historic section of freeway through Balboa Park south of I-8 was the first freeway in San Diego County and one of the first in California. Before 1964, this was the southernmost section of U.S. Route 395 (US 395), which was truncated to Hesperia when it was replaced by I-15. This section is also designated as a State Scenic Highway.

== Route description ==
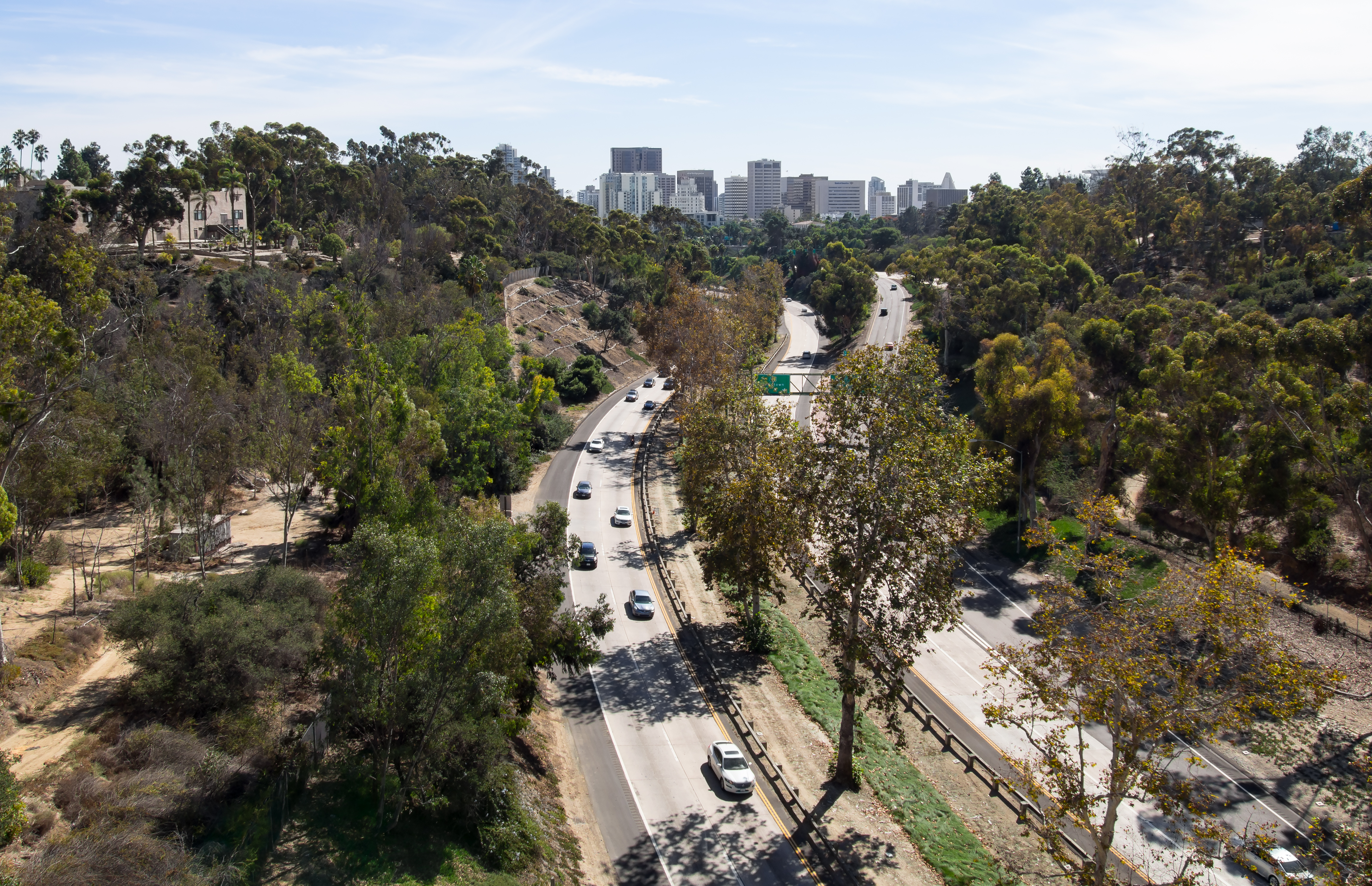
The Cabrillo Freeway leading into downtown San Diego

Route 163 is defined in section 463 of the California Streets and Highways Code, and that the highway is "from Route 5 near Balboa Park in San Diego to Route 15 near Miramar Naval Air Station".

SR 163 begins in downtown San Diego at an at-grade intersection with A Street and 11th Avenue. Shortly after, the freeway has an interchange with I-5 before entering Balboa Park. This 2.5-mile (4.0 km) section of SR 163 is built to parkway standards, featuring a wide, grassy median with trees, four through traffic lanes, and several very sharp curves, also passing under the Cabrillo Bridge. Shortly after leaving Balboa Park, SR 163 has an interchange with I-8 in Mission Valley. North of this interchange, SR 163 becomes a modern, Interstate-standard, eight-lane freeway. Continuing north, the freeway climbs uphill from Mission Valley to Linda Vista, where it has a partial interchange with I-805; traffic northbound on one freeway can only transfer only onto northbound of the other and southbound traffic can only transfer onto southbound direction of the other freeway. In Kearny Mesa, the freeway has a partial interchange with SR 52, one of the biggest bottlenecks in San Diego County. The freeway then heads north to and merges with I-15 near Miramar, where the southern terminus of the high-occupancy toll (HOT) lanes of I-15 are located. Ramps were built to allow traffic on SR 163 to enter and exit the express lanes of I-15.

SR 163 is part of the California Freeway and Expressway System and is part of the National Highway System, a network of highways that are considered essential to the country's economy, defense, and mobility by the Federal Highway Administration. SR 163 is eligible to be included in the State Scenic Highway System, and is designated as a scenic highway in Balboa Park by the California Department of Transportation (Caltrans), meaning that it is a substantial section of highway passing through a "memorable landscape" with no "visual intrusions", where the potential designation has gained popular favor with the community.

== History ==
The southernmost portion of the highway, running through Balboa Park, began construction in 1942 and opened in 1948 as part of US 395; it was the first freeway in San Diego County and one of the first in California. The Cabrillo Freeway was also part of US 80 from the late 1940s until 1964. This stretch of road has been called one of America's most beautiful parkways, and was designated a California Historic Parkway in 2002.

On May 17, 1995, former US soldier and plumber Shawn Nelson stole a tank from the National Guard armory and went on a destructive rampage throughout San Diego. Driving onto SR 163, the tank was eventually disabled when it became stuck on a traffic barrier, where Nelson was shot and killed by San Diego police.

== Exit list ==
The entire route is in San Diego, San Diego County.

| mi | km | Exit | Destinations | Notes |
|---|---|---|---|---|
| 0.00 | 0.00 | — | 10th Avenue | Continuation beyond Ash Street; south end of SR 163; northbound entrance only accessible from 11th Avenue and A Street |
| 0.06 | 0.097 | 1A | Ash Street | No exit number northbound |
| 0.06 | 0.097 | 1A | I-5 north (San Diego Freeway) / 4th Avenue – Los Angeles | Southbound exit is part of exit 1B; I-5 south exit 16 |
| 0.36 | 0.58 | 1B | I-5 south (San Diego Freeway) / Park Boulevard | Southbound exit and northbound entrance; I-5 north exit 16A |
| 0.36 | 0.58 | 1B | Quince Street – Balboa Park | Northbound exit only |
| 1.27 | 2.04 | 1C | Richmond Street – San Diego Zoo, Museums | Northbound exit only |
| 2.22 | 3.57 | 2A | Robinson Avenue | Northbound exit and southbound entrance; serves Scripps Mercy Hospital, Hillcrest Medical Center at UC San Diego Health |
| 2.22 | 3.57 | 2A | Washington Street east (I-8 Bus.) | Signed as exit 2B northbound; former US 80 |
| 2.22 | 3.57 | 2B | Washington Street west (I-8 Bus.) | No northbound exit; serves Scripps Mercy Hospital, Hillcrest Medical Center at UC San Diego Health |
| 2.45 | 3.94 | 2C | 6th Avenue, University Avenue | No northbound exit |
| 3.21 | 5.17 | 3 | I-8 / Hotel Circle – El Centro, Beaches | Signed as exits 3A (east) and 3B (west); I-8 east exits 4B-C, west exits 4A-B |
| 3.84 | 6.18 | 4 | Friars Road | Northbound exit is part of exit 3B |
| 5.26 | 8.47 | 5 | Genesee Avenue | Signed as exits 5A (east) and 5B (west) northbound; serves Sharp Memorial Hospital |
| 6.01 | 9.67 | 6 | Mesa College Drive / Kearny Villa Road | Northbound exit and southbound entrance; serves Sharp Memorial Hospital |
| 6.51 | 10.48 | 7A | I-805 north (Jacob Dekema Freeway) – Los Angeles | Northbound exit and southbound entrance; I-805 south exit 20 |
| 6.51 | 10.48 | 7A | I-805 south (Jacob Dekema Freeway) – Chula Vista | Southbound exit and northbound entrance; I-805 north exit 20B |
| 7.48 | 12.04 | 7B | Balboa Avenue | Former SR 274 |
| 8.28 | 13.33 | 8 | Clairemont Mesa Boulevard | |
| 9.02 | 14.52 | 9A | SR 52 east | Northbound exit and southbound entrance; SR 52 exit 6 |
| 9.02 | 14.52 | 9B | SR 52 west | Signed as exit 9 southbound; no northbound entrance; SR 52 exit 6 |
| 10.31 | 16.59 | 10 | Kearny Villa Road | Former US 395 |
| | | — | I-15 Express Lanes north | Northbound exit and southbound entrance |
| 11.23 | 18.07 | — | I-15 north (Escondido Freeway) – Escondido | No access to I-15 south; I-15 south exit 12 |
1.000 mi = 1.609 km; 1.000 km = 0.621 mi: Electronic toll collection; Incomplete access
