= Tene, Mali =

Tene
- Commune and town
- Location in Mali
- Coordinates: 13°25′N 4°35′W
- Country: Mali
- Region: Ségou Region
- Cercle: San Cercle

Area
  - Total: 110 sq mi (280 km^{2})

Population (2016)
  - Total: 25,337
  - Density: 190/sq mi (73/km^{2})
- Time zone: UTC+0 (GMT)
- Website: www.teneinfo.com

Tene is a small town and commune in the Cercle of San in the Ségou Region of Mali. As of 2015 the commune had a population of 25,337.

Tene is a small town of 6000 people(2015) between San and Mopti.Tene is a major commercial center in Segou region due to it strategic location. Market day takes place on Saturdays. The town has a very dynamic Community Health center and a school that is overcrowded.The major concern of the population of Tene is the lack of electricity.
