= Interstate 805 =

Interstate highway in California

Interstate 805
- Jacob Dekema Freeway
- I-805 highlighted in red

Route information
- Auxiliary route of I-5
- Maintained by Caltrans
- Length: 28.016 mi (45.087 km)
- Existed: 1959–present
- NHS: Entire route

Major junctions
- South end: I-5 in San Ysidro
- SR 905 in Otay Mesa; SR 54 in National City; SR 94 in San Diego; SR 15 in San Diego; I-8 in Mission Valley; SR 163 in Clairemont; SR 52 in University City
- North end: I-5 in Sorrento Valley

Location
- Country: United States
- State: California
- Counties: San Diego

Highway system
- Interstate Highway System; Main; Auxiliary; Suffixed; Business; Future; State highways in California; Interstate; US; State; Scenic; History; Pre‑1964; Unconstructed; Deleted; Freeways
← I-780	→ I-880

Interstate 805 (I-805) is a major north–south auxiliary Interstate Highway in Southern California. It is a bypass auxiliary route of I-5, running roughly through the center of the Greater San Diego region from San Ysidro (part of the city of San Diego) near the Mexico–U.S. border to near Del Mar. The southern terminus of I-805 at I-5 in San Ysidro is less than 1 mi (1.6 km) north of the Mexican border. I-805 then traverses the cities of Chula Vista and National City before reentering San Diego. The freeway passes through the San Diego neighborhoods of North Park, Mission Valley, Clairemont, and University City before terminating at I-5 in the Sorrento Valley neighborhood near the Del Mar city limit.

Planning for I-805 began in 1956, and the route was officially designated in 1959 before it was renumbered in the 1964 state highway renumbering. Starting in 1967, the freeway was built in phases, with the northern part of the freeway finished before the southern part. I-805 was completed and open to traffic in 1975. Named the Jacob Dekema Freeway after the longtime head of the regional division of the California Department of Transportation (Caltrans), I-805 has been frequently cited for its complex engineering and architecture, including near I-8 on the Mission Valley Viaduct. Since then, several construction projects have taken place, including the construction of carpool lanes.

== Route description ==
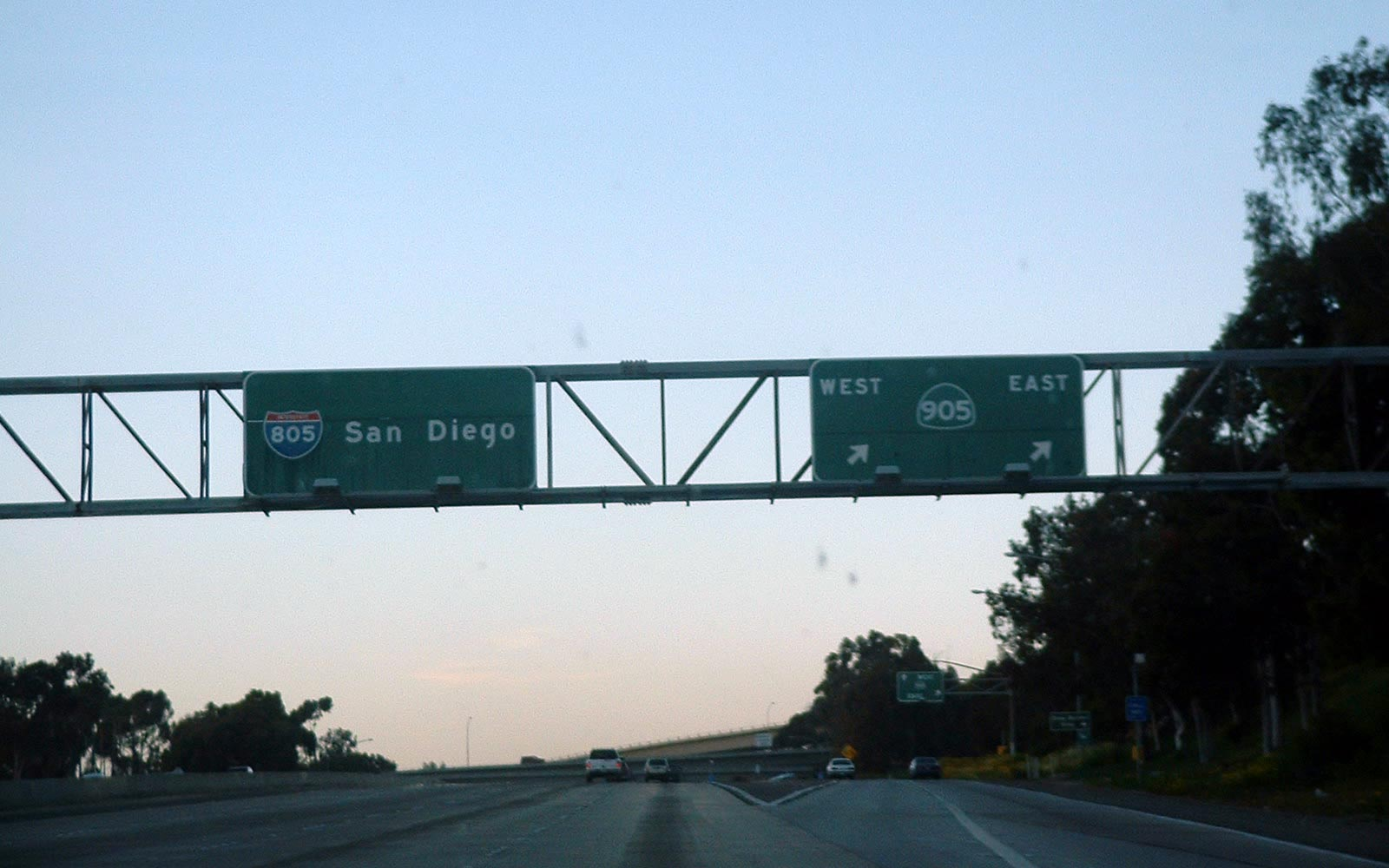
I-805 northbound at SR 905

The entirety of I-805 is defined in section 621 of the California Streets and Highways Code as Route 805, and that the highway is from "Route 5 near San Ysidro to Route 5 north of La Jolla and easterly of existing Route 5". This definition roughly corresponds with the Federal Highway Administration (FHWA)'s route logs of I-805.

I-805 begins at I-5 near the Mexican border in a far south part of San Ysidro, a neighborhood of San Diego. As it starts its journey northwards, it quickly has a junction with State Route 905 (SR 905) before exiting the city of San Diego and entering Chula Vista. Within the past 20 years the freeway has delineated the apparent divide between rich and poor in the city of Chula Vista; those on the eastern side of the freeway have been more affluent and have better schools compared to those on the western side. Just outside the city, I-805 meets County Route S17 (CR S17), also named Bonita Road, before coming to an interchange with SR 54. The freeway then enters National City, where it intersects Sweetwater Road and Plaza Boulevard, before leaving the city and reentering the city of San Diego.

I-805 continues northward through San Diego, where it intersects SR 94, the Martin Luther King Jr. Freeway. As the freeway continues through San Diego, it meets SR 15, the continuation of I-15. It then intersects El Cajon Boulevard before passing under the Hazard Memorial Bridge that carries Adams Avenue. The bridge was named after Roscoe Hazard for his involvement in the construction of several roads and highways in Southern California. I-805 then travels on the Mission Valley Viaduct, a towering reinforced concrete viaduct built in 1972, spanning over Mission Valley and the San Diego River. The viaduct is the top stack of the Jack Schrade Interchange over I-8, which runs along the south side of Mission Valley and crosses underneath the viaduct perpendicularly, and is San Diego County's only symmetrical stack interchange. The San Diego Trolley traffic also runs under the viaduct on the valley floor.

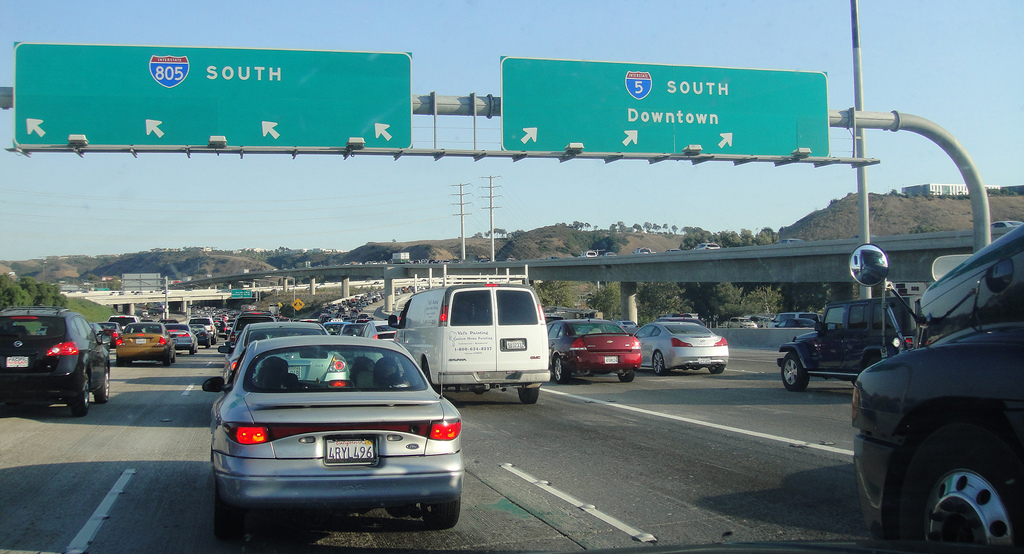
The beginning of I-805 south at I-5 during the evening rush hour

After intersecting SR 163, also known as the Cabrillo Freeway, I-805 continues through suburban San Diego, where it meets SR 52 in Clairemont Mesa. North of SR 52, it closely parallels I-5 near La Jolla, heading northwest. Passing under the Eastgate Mall arch bridge and entering Sorrento Valley, it finally meets its north end at I-5. During the widening project which was completed in 2007, I-5 at the I-805 merge was built to be 21 lanes wide. Eastbound SR 56 and Carmel Mountain Road are accessible via a parallel carriageway for local traffic heading northbound from I-805; traffic from SR 56 westbound can merge onto I-805 from the local bypass.

The route is officially known as the Jacob Dekema Freeway after Jacob Dekema, a pioneering force from the California Department of Transportation (Caltrans) who helped shape the San Diego freeway system. It is also part of the California Freeway and Expressway System and the National Highway System, a network of highways that are considered essential to the country's economy, defense, and mobility by the Federal Highway Administration. In 2013, I-805 had an annual average daily traffic (AADT) of 41,500 at the southern terminus, and 262,000 between Bonita Road and SR 54, the latter of which was the highest AADT for the highway.

== History ==
=== Construction ===
According to Dekema, planning for I-805 began in 1956. The original routing for I-805 was approved as an Interstate Highway in July 1958. It was added to the state highway system and the Freeway and Expressway System in 1959 as Route 241. I-805 was expected to reduce traffic on what was then US 101 between Los Angeles and San Diego, when the former was opened. Route 241 was renumbered to Route 805 in the 1964 state highway renumbering, and I-5 was designated along the route from Los Angeles to San Diego. Further planning was underway in 1965, with the goal to have the route built by 1972, the federal highway funding deadline. This was to be the first freeway in the area with no prior road along its route that it would replace; the goal was to provide a bypass around San Diego for those traveling to Mexico, and improve access for local residents. By June, houses along the route in the North Park area were being sold, as the land was needed for the first stretch of the freeway to be constructed. The next year, Dekema confirmed that the first portion of what was known as the Inland Freeway to be built would be between Home and Adams avenues.

In May 1967, bidding began, after construction had been delayed by that of the I-5 and I-8 freeways, both of which had been given higher priority. This first portion would run from Wabash Boulevard to around Madison Avenue (a distance of 3.5 mi or 5.6 km), and the next portion would include the I-8 interchange. The R.E. Hazard and W.F. Maxwell Companies won the low bid of $11.7 million (equivalent to $86.1 million in 2025) in mid-1967. The groundbreaking ceremony happened on September 25 at El Cajon Boulevard and Boundary Street. In August 1968, the portion of I-805 from just south of I-8 to north of Friars Road, including the interchange with I-8, was put up for bidding; at a budgeted $27.5 million (equivalent to $194 million in 2025), it was the most expensive job that the Division of Highways had ever put up for bid. The winning bid was $20.9 million (equivalent to $188 million in 2025), and was awarded to R.E. Hazard Contracting Company and W.F. Maxwell Company.

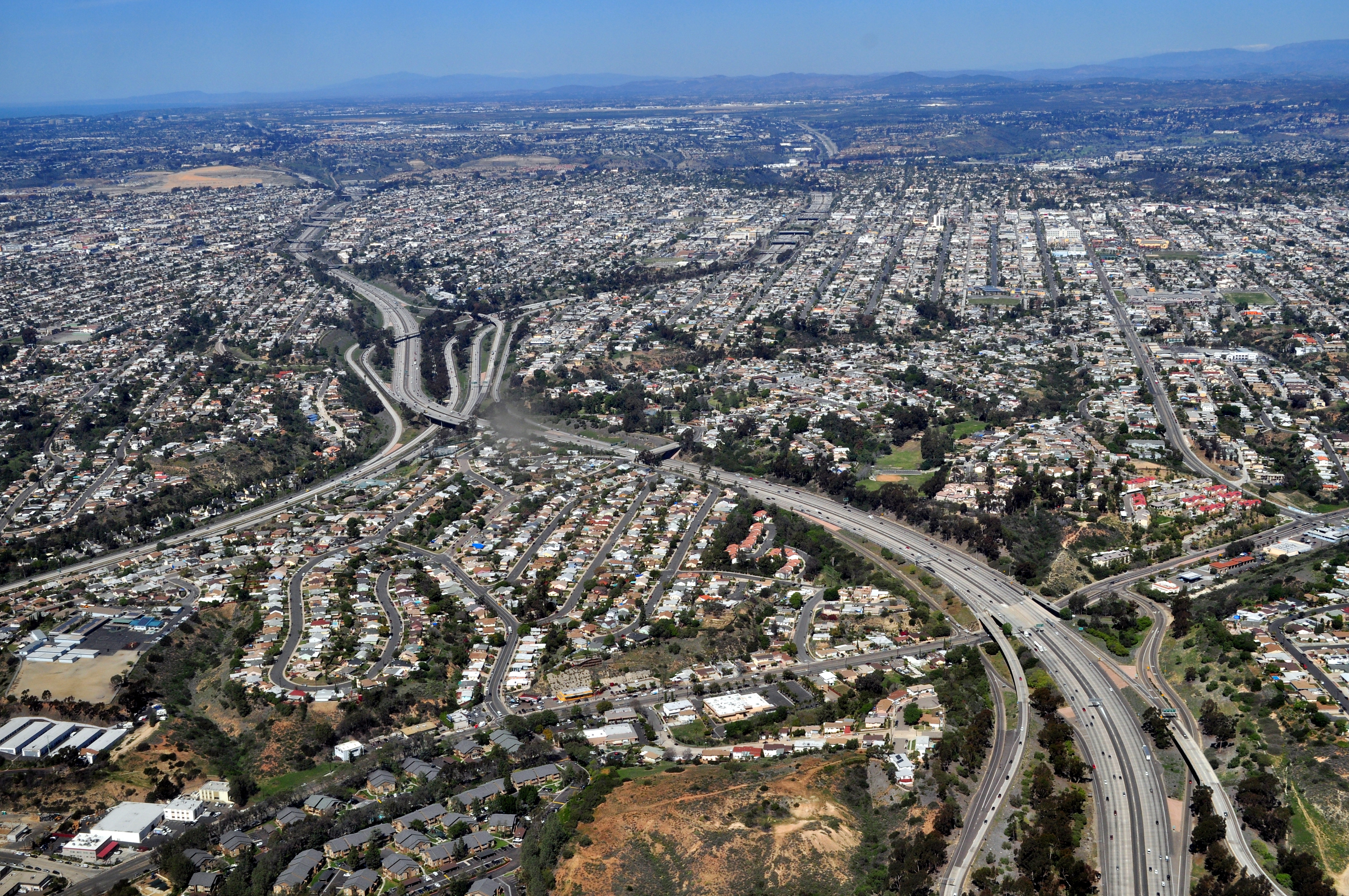
Aerial view of I-805 near the SR 15 interchange

Construction had begun on the viaduct by May 1969; in the meantime, National City was making plans for developing the freeway corridor with motels and restaurants, as well as a shopping center. In mid-1969, bidding was to begin on 3.2 miles (5.1 km) of I-805 from north of Friars Road to north of what was then US 395, which would become SR 163. Construction from J Street south to near San Ysidro was underway by September, when there were concerns that an order from President Richard Nixon to reduce federal construction projects by 75 percent might affect funding for the portion north of Friars Road. However, Governor Ronald Reagan lifted the associated freeze in construction at the state level a few weeks later. A month later, the contract for the portion between Friars Road and US 395 had been awarded for $15 million (equivalent to $101 million in 2025); the portions between there and north of Miramar Road were in the planning phases, while construction continued south of I-8 to Wabash Boulevard. The 2.4-mile (3.9 km) portion from SR 52 to Miramar Road had been contracted out to O.G. Sansome Company for $5.6 million (equivalent to $37.7 million in 2025) by the end of 1969. Meanwhile, $4 million (equivalent to $26.9 million in 2025) of state funding was spent in 1969 to find housing for those who were to be displaced by the freeway in San Ysidro.

By March 1970, the original section between Home Avenue and near I-8 was almost finished. The Mission Valley portion extending north of US 395, as well as from Otay Valley Road and J Street in Chula Vista, were still under construction. The portion immediately north of US 395 was contracted to A.A. Baxter Corporation, E.C. Young, and Young and Sons, Inc. for $7.9 million (equivalent to $50.5 million in 2025). On July 6, the first section to begin construction was dedicated, and was to be opened from El Cajon Boulevard to Wabash Boulevard soon thereafter; the rest of the section would not open until the Mission Valley interchange with I-8 was finished.

A second border crossing in the San Ysidro area was proposed near the Playas de Tijuana area, that would be accessible from I-805, although another alternative was considered near Brown Field. A formal study on the matter was commissioned in August. However, this would have added $10 million (equivalent to $63.9 million in 2025) to the cost of the freeway, and possibly delay it by up to 10 years; furthermore, most traffic crossing the border was found to head to Tijuana and not Ensenada. Following this, the city of Chula Vista asked that the state proceed with the original plans to construct the freeway, even though it would pass through a San Ysidro neighborhood.

In September 1970, bidding began for the final portion of the northern half of I-805 between Miramar Road and I-5; a month later, the segments between Home Avenue and SR 94, and SR 54 to 12th Street had funding allocated. By the end of the year, Hazard, Maxwell, and Matich had submitted the low bid of around $7.2 million (equivalent to $46 million in 2025) for the northernmost portion. The Chula Vista portion of the freeway from Main Street to L Street was completed in February 1971; by then, the estimated date for completing the entire freeway had slipped to 1975 from 1972. By March, the projected completion date for the Mission Valley bridge was revised to July 1972. A 102-home mobile home park was approved by the City Council a few weeks later to house those who were displaced by the freeway construction.

The portion of the freeway from Otay Valley Road to Telegraph Canyon Road opened during 1972. On October 22, several unconstructed portions of I-805 were partially funded, including from Chula Vista south past SR 75, north of the completed Chula Vista portion to SR 54, from SR 54 to Plaza Boulevard in National City, from there to SR 94 (including the interchange with SR 252), and from there to Home Avenue. Before the end of the year, the portion from SR 94 to Home Avenue entered the bidding phase; Guy F. Atkinson Company won the contract for roughly $9.96 million (equivalent to $58 million in 2025) in early 1972. Following a request from the El Cajon City Council, March 19 was set aside as a Community Cycle Day for bicyclists to travel the newly finished freeway from El Cajon Boulevard to SR 52, just before the freeway was to be dedicated the next day; during the event, around 30 people had injured themselves, and police estimated that some bicyclists had attained speeds of up to 60 mph (97 km/h) traveling down the hill leading to the Mission Valley Viaduct. The entire Mission Valley Viaduct was open to traffic that month.

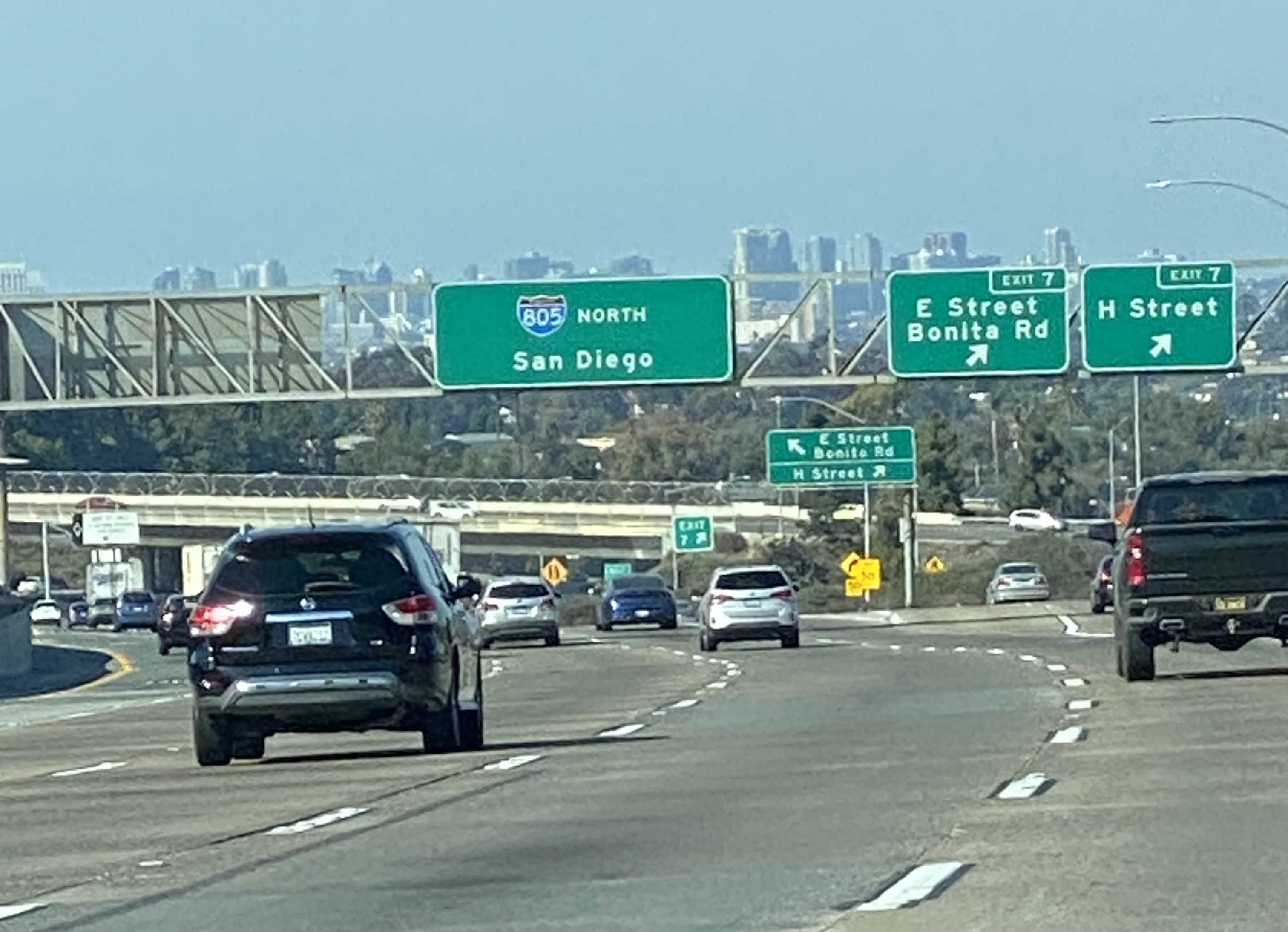
I-805 northbound in Chula Vista, with the San Diego skyline in the background

By the beginning of 1974, I-805 was open north of Home Avenue, and from Otay Valley Road to Telegraph Canyon Road in Chula Vista; five segments remaining were under construction, and the last segment was funded. The Imperial Avenue section of I-805 remained in the budget, despite revisions in response to the 1973 oil crisis. In late January, I-805 between SR 15 and SR 94 was opened to traffic, though not all of the ramps at the SR 94 interchange were operational. The connectors to SR 94 east were completed in March. The entire portion between SR 94 and Home Avenue cost $10.5 million (equivalent to $53.3 million in 2025). Construction between SR 94 and Imperial Avenue was well under way by December, at a cost of $8.5 million (equivalent to $43.1 million in 2025).

As the scheduled completion of the freeway neared, Mayor Tom Hamilton of Chula Vista expressed concerns regarding the predicted development of the I-805 corridor, and the decisions that the City Council would need to make regarding such plans. The portion south of Otay Valley Road cost $15 million (equivalent to $69.6 million in 2025), and the portion between Telegraph Canyon Road and Sweetwater Road cost $12 million (equivalent to $55.7 million in 2025). The portion from there to Imperial Avenue was projected to cost $10.2 million (equivalent to $47.3 million in 2025). The dedication of the freeway took place on July 23, 1975, even though the freeway was not entirely finished, due to the desire to hold the ceremony during the summer. I-805 from Plaza Boulevard to Telegraph Canyon Road opened to traffic on July 28, leaving the freeway complete except for the portion between Plaza Boulevard and SR 94. While portions of the freeway were nearly ready for traffic, there were reports of motorists driving on the closed freeway, which the California Highway Patrol warned was illegal. On September 3, Dekema announced that the entirety of the freeway would open the next day as he made a final inspection of the unopened portion; the total cost of the construction was $145 million (equivalent to $673 million in 2025). However, Dekema announced that there was no more state funding available to construct further roads for the short-term.

=== Recognition, artwork, and architecture ===
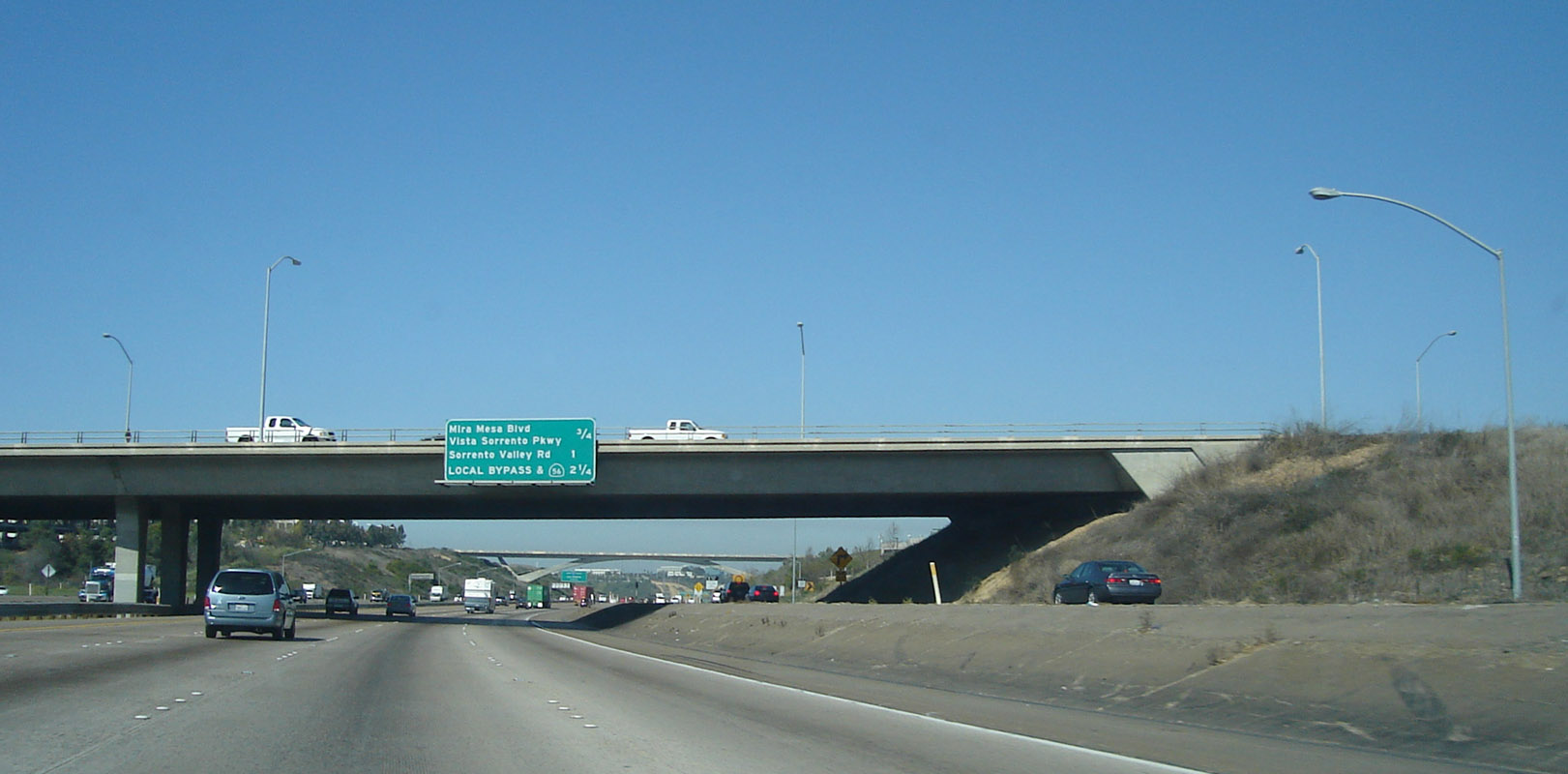
The La Jolla Village Drive overpass on I-805 northbound, with the Eastgate Mall bridge in the background

The Mission Valley Viaduct was recognized by the American Society of Civil Engineers (ASCE) as the "Outstanding Civil Engineering Project for 1973 in the San Diego Area"; it was designed to match the close by Mission San Diego de Alcalá with its columns that look similar to cathedral windows, and arch-like shapes etched into the textured concrete. The viaduct was designed to span 3,900 ft (1,200 m), and use squared-off support columns instead of traditional cylindrical supports. Octagonal columns were to be used on the ramps and the ends of the bridge. Over 600 tons (540 tonnes) of steel bars were to be used, and the bridge was constructed as high as 98 ft (30 m) above I-8. The Adams Avenue Bridge over I-805 was also recognized for its 439-foot (134 m) span and two tapered supports on the ends of the bridge; in 1968, a Princeton University engineering professor asked for a copy of the design from Caltrans for educational purposes. The construction supervisor, in fact, compared the construction of this bridge to building a boat, and it was constructed from the middle outward rather than the conventional method of building from the ends inward. The span was designed to be 268 ft (82 m) long, and 100 ft (30 m) high.

Awards for the Eastgate Mall (or Old Miramar Bridge) came from the Federal Highway Administration, San Diego Highway Development Association, and Prestressed Concrete Institute Awards Program; at the time, it was one of the first arch bridges in the state, and did not use traditional concrete pillars. The San Diego Union (predecessor to the Union-Tribune) published a few freelance articles in 1984 about I-805, complimenting the four-level interchange with I-8 and the arch bridge at Eastgate Mall, while mentioning that subsequent inflation after their completion would have made such structures more difficult to build if they had been constructed later. Other artwork and architecture that was mentioned included the Wateridge development in Sorrento Valley, and the "Stargazer" building by Alexander Liberman that was lit with fluorescent colors at night.

However, not all forms of artwork along the highway were uncontroversial. In 1977, there were several complaints regarding new billboards that were installed at the northern terminus of the highway, since they blocked the view of the coast. In 1981, an illegal mural that was determined to be incomplete was discovered at the I-8 interchange; while Caltrans discouraged the painting of such murals, they were impressed with the portion that had already been completed. Art Cole, the artist, stepped forward to the department, and was allowed to finish the mural of a desert highland sunrise; following this, Caltrans made efforts to have other murals commissioned.

The San Ysidro Chamber of Commerce attempted to have I-805 named as the San Ysidro Freeway in 1976. However, I-805 was named after Jacob Dekema in August 1981, and ceremonies to mark the occasion occurred in February 1982. The plaque honoring Dekema was installed in November at the Governor Drive interchange. Because of his efforts in designing I-805, Ed Settle of Caltrans was given the Outstanding Civil Engineering Award from the ASCE; he designed several other regional freeways, including SR 163 through Balboa Park and I-5 through San Diego.

=== Expansion ===
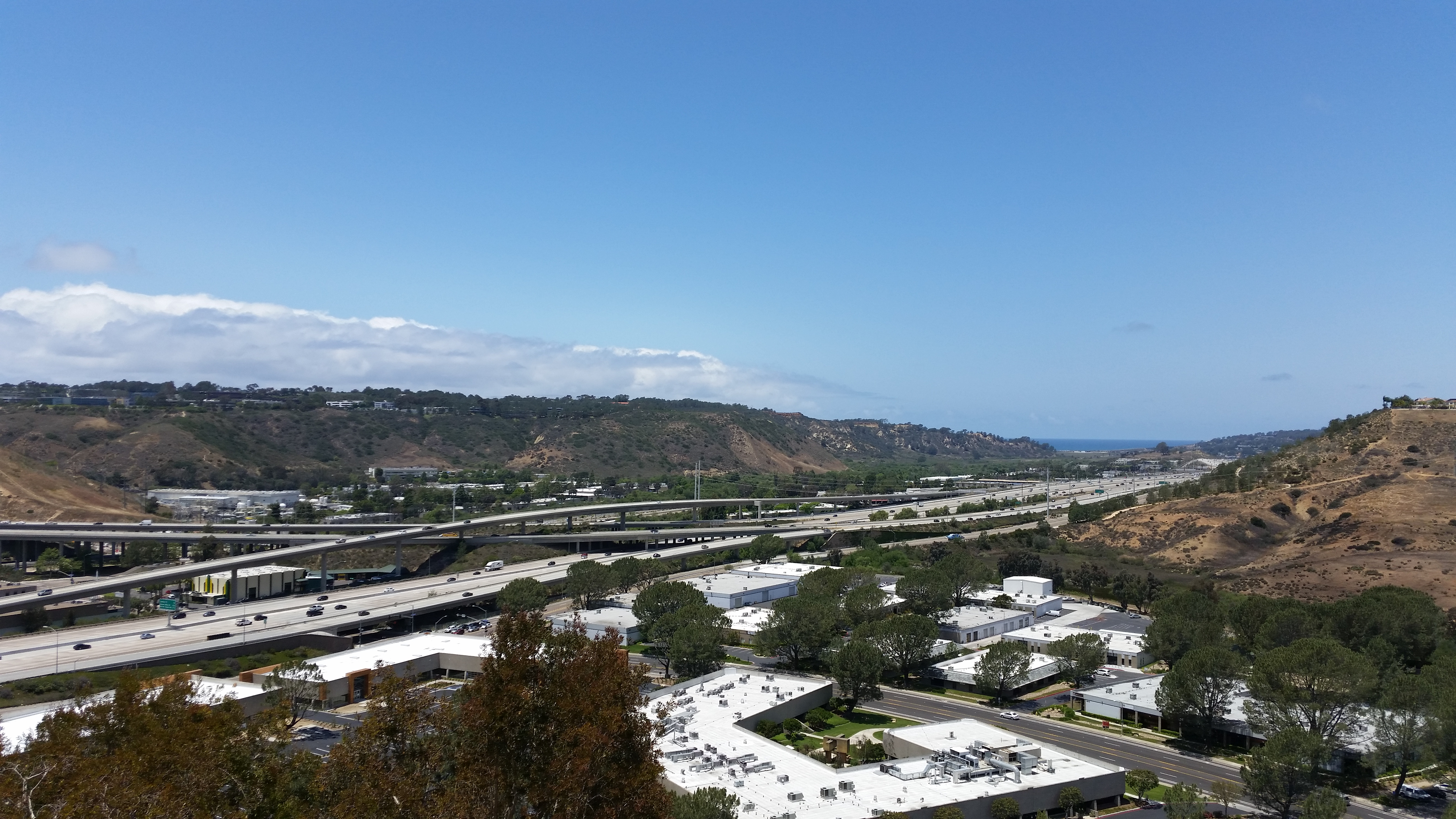
"Dual freeway" at northern I-805 terminus

The construction of a "dual freeway" at the northern end of I-805 was discussed as early as 1989, referring to the two carriageways needed for each direction of the freeway, resulting in four total. It would require drivers to use the new local lanes to access eastbound SR 56 from I-5 or I-805. The project would allow for trucks to use the new lanes to assist in merging with traffic. However, it faced opposition from local residents, concerned about the loss of the view from their homes, as well as environmentalists concerned about nearby wetlands. Further objections espoused the view that the congestion would continue to increase, regardless of what was done, and that the new road would be at capacity in a few years. The San Diego Association of Governments (SANDAG) funded the construction with $110 million (equivalent to $195 million in 2025) in mid-2000.

Construction of the "dual freeway" began in early 2002, at a cost of $182 million (equivalent to $311 million in 2025). The northbound lanes were scheduled to open in February 2006. The southbound lanes were completed in early 2007. That year, a three-year project began to allow robot controlled vehicles, including buses and trucks, to use a special lane. The intention is to allow the vehicles to travel at shorter following distances and thereby allow more vehicles to use the lanes. The vehicles will still have drivers since they need to enter and exit the special lanes. The system was designed by Swoop Technology, based in San Diego County.

Two years later, construction began on two auxiliary lanes on I-805 southbound from SR 54 to Bonita Road, to improve traffic flow at the SR 54 interchange. In 2010, Caltrans proposed adding high-occupancy toll express lanes between SR 15 and East Palomar Street in Chula Vista. The California Transportation Commission (CTC) awarded $100 million for the work in June 2011, which would be split into two phases at the interchange with SR 54. Work is also underway to add two HOV lanes between SR 52 and Mira Mesa Boulevard; this project also received $59.5 million from the CTC in September 2011. Meanwhile, SANDAG made arrangements to purchase the SR 125 toll road and reduce the tolls, which was hoped to encourage commuters to take that road instead of I-805 and reduce congestion; this would then enable Caltrans to construct two managed lanes instead of the original four.

In February 2013, construction began on the northern HOV lanes; the project came at a cost $86 million. By May, construction on the Palomar Street direct access ramps had begun, and the Carroll Canyon Road ramps were almost finished. The northern project was completed in 2015, and the southern HOV lanes opened in March 2014 at a cost of $1.4 billion, with an option to expand them into two lanes in each direction, and a proposed direct ramp to the express lanes. A 2012 Caltrans report proposed adding four managed lanes along the entire length of the highway. The northern section carpool lanes are a continuation of the ones from Interstate 5 at the Sorrento Valley interchange and continue to Governor Drive. The southern section carpool lanes exist from SR 94 and Palomar Street. Plans exist to construct the 11-mile gap between SR 94 and Governor Drive have been put on hold until there are enough funds to widen the freeway and replace any necessary overpasses. In 2016, a half-cent sales tax was imposed to eventually pay for the construction of this gap.

== Exit list ==
The entire route is in San Diego County.

Location	mi	km	Exit	Destinations	Notes
San Diego	0.00	0.00	—	Mexico Only (I-5 south)	No access to I-5 north; exit goes directly to the San Ysidro Port of Entry at the Mexican border; southern terminus; I-5 north exit 1A
San Diego	0.00	0.00	1A	Camino de la Plaza	Southbound exit and northbound entrance; last USA exit southbound
San Diego	0.50	0.80	1B	San Ysidro Boulevard	Signed as exit 1A northbound
San Diego	1.66	2.67	1C	SR 905	Signed as exit 1B northbound; SR 905 exit 2B; future I-905
San Diego	2.78	4.47	2	Palm Avenue	
Chula Vista	3.51	5.65	3	Main Street / Auto Park Drive	
Chula Vista	4.27	6.87	4	Olympic Parkway / East Orange Avenue	
Chula Vista	4.91	7.90	♦	East Palomar Street	HOV access only; southbound left exit and northbound entrance
Chula Vista	5.51	8.87	6	L Street / Telegraph Canyon Road	
Chula Vista	7.01	11.28	7	H Street	Signed as exits 7A (east) and 7B (west) southbound
Chula Vista	7.61	12.25	7C	E Street / Bonita Road (CR S17)	Northbound exit is part of exit 7.
National City	8.71	14.02	8	SR 54 (South Bay Freeway)	Signed as exit 9 southbound; SR 54 exit 2
National City	8.90	14.32	9	Sweetwater Road	Signed as exit 8 southbound
National City	10.13	16.30	10	Plaza Boulevard	
San Diego	11.16	17.96	11A	43rd Street	Signed as exit 11B southbound; former SR 252
San Diego	11.22	18.06	11B	47th Street / Palm Avenue – National City	Signed as exit 11A southbound
San Diego	12.20	19.63	12A	Imperial Avenue	
San Diego	12.80	20.60	12B	Market Street	
San Diego	13.36	21.50	13A	SR 94 (M. L. King Jr. Freeway)	Southbound access to SR 94 west is via exit 14; SR 94 exit 3
San Diego	13.80	22.21	13B	Home Avenue	
San Diego	14.49	23.32	14	SR 15 north (Escondido Freeway)	Northbound exit and southbound entrance; future I-15; SR 15 south exit 3
San Diego	14.49	23.32	14	SR 15 south (Escondido Freeway) to SR 94 west (M. L. King Jr. Freeway)	Southbound exit and northbound entrance; Future I-15; SR 15 north exit 3
San Diego	15.80	25.43	15	North Park Way / University Avenue	North Park Way not signed northbound
San Diego	16.28	26.20	16	El Cajon Boulevard (Historic US 80)	Former US 80
San Diego	16.84	27.10	17A	Adams Avenue / Madison Avenue	Southbound exit and northbound entrance
San Diego	17.50	28.16	17B	I-8 (Mission Valley Freeway) – Beaches, El Centro	Signed as exit 17 northbound; I-8 exit 6B
San Diego	18.74	30.16	18	Murray Ridge Road / Phyllis Place	
San Diego	20.08	32.32	20A	Mesa College Drive / Kearny Villa Road	Northbound exit and southbound entrance
San Diego	20.45	32.91	20B	SR 163 north (Cabrillo Freeway) – Escondido	Northbound exit and southbound entrance; SR 163 south exit 7A; former US 395
San Diego	20.45	32.91	20	SR 163 south (Cabrillo Freeway) – Downtown San Diego	Southbound exit and northbound entrance; SR 163 north exit 7A; former US 395
San Diego	21.51	34.62	21	Balboa Avenue	Former SR 274
San Diego	22.41	36.07	22	Clairemont Mesa Boulevard	
San Diego	23.50	37.82	23	SR 52 (Soledad Freeway) – La Jolla, Santee	SR 52 exit 3
San Diego	24.29	39.09	24	Governor Drive	
San Diego	25.33	40.76	25A	Nobel Drive	Northbound exit and southbound entrance
San Diego	25.79	41.50	25B	Miramar Road / La Jolla Village Drive	Signed as exit 25 southbound; serves UC San Diego Health Center
San Diego			♦	Carroll Canyon Road	HOV access only
San Diego	26.92– 28.15	43.32– 45.30	27	Mira Mesa Boulevard / Vista Sorrento Parkway / Sorrento Valley Road	Signed as exits 27A (Mira Mesa/Vista Sorrento) and 27B (Sorrento Valley Road) northbound; Vista Sorrento Parkway not signed southbound
San Diego	28.73	46.24	33A (Note: Exit number follows I-5 rather than I-805.)	I-5 Local Bypass to SR 56 east	Northbound exit and southbound entrance
San Diego	28.73	46.24	—	I-5 north (San Diego Freeway) – Los Angeles	No access to I-5 south; northern terminus; I-5 south exit 31
1.000 mi = 1.609 km; 1.000 km = 0.621 mi: HOV only; Incomplete access
