= Sy, Mali =

Coordinates: 13°36′N 4°59′W

Sy
- Commune and town
- Interactive map of Sy
- Country: Mali
- Region: Ségou Region
- Cercle: San Cercle

Population (1998)
  - Total: 8,888
- Time zone: UTC+0 (GMT)

Sy is a small town and commune in the Cercle of San in the Ségou Region of Mali. In 1998 the commune had a population of 8,888.
