= Bendugu (province) =

Bendugu or Bendougou was a province of the Mali Empire and later the Songhai Empire, in modern-day Mali. It lies south of the Bani River, west of Djenne. The name means 'country of grass' in Bamanan.

== History ==
In 1542 Askia Ishaq I defeated the Mali Empire in Bendougou, but the province remained in Malian hands. In the 1570s Bendugu was raided by Askia Daoud, part of a wider campaign to restore central control over the periphery of the empire. In the early 18th century the region was devastated by an invasion by the Kong Empire.

In the 1830s Bendougou was reorganized as a province of the Massina Empire.

== Government ==
Bendugu, like the neighboring Kala, was divided between 12 kings, mostly of the Traore lineage. It was administered by a centrally-appointed official known as the Yaw. In the 18th century, Bendugu lay on the periphery of the Segou Empire, and this loose control led to anarchic conditions and the proliferation of petty kingdoms during this period.
