= San Cercle =

Coordinates: 13°18′N 4°54′W

- Cercle
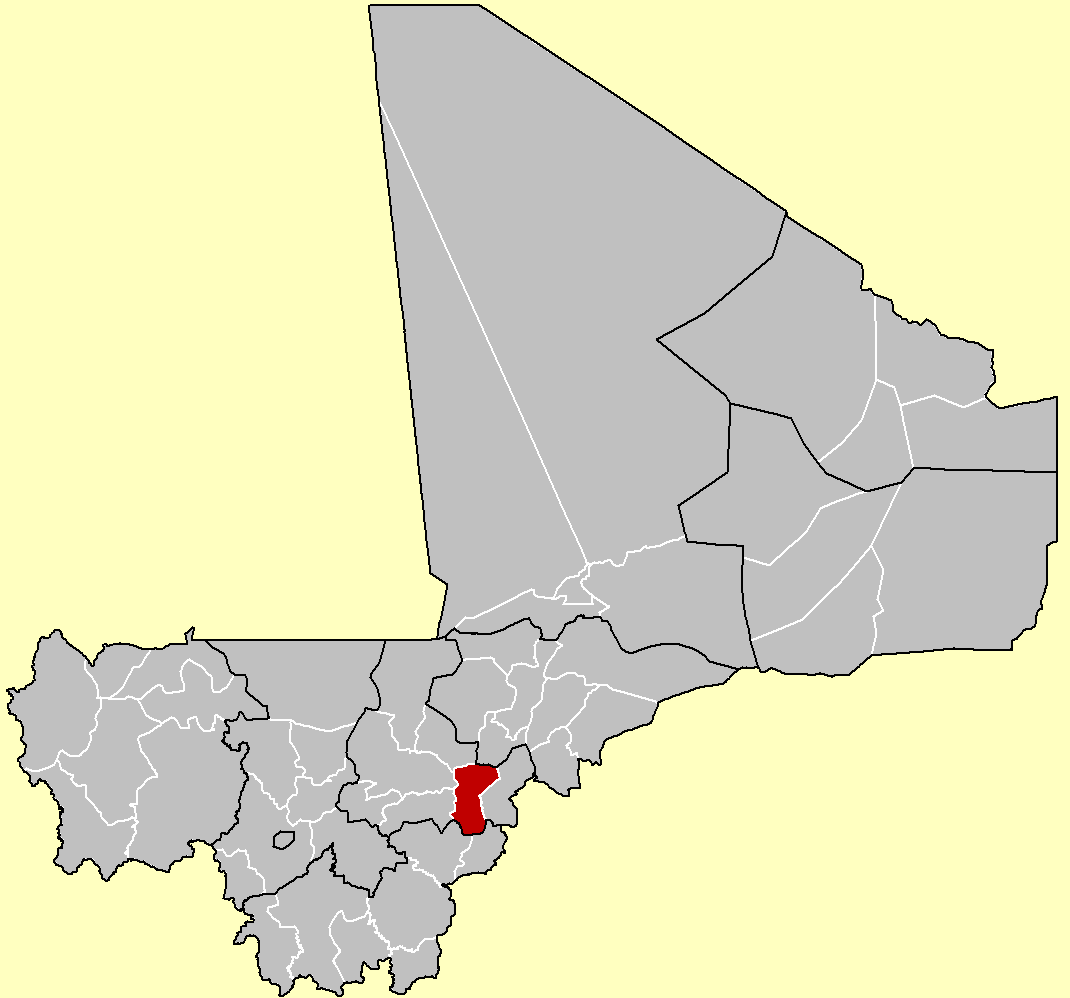
- Location of the Cercle of San in Mali
- Country: Mali
- Region: Ségou Region
- Admin HQ (chef-lieu): San

Area
  - Total: 7,262 km^{2} (2,804 sq mi)

Population (2009 census)
  - Total: 334,911
  - Density: 46.12/km^{2} (119.4/sq mi)
- Time zone: UTC+0 (GMT)

San Cercle is an administrative subdivision of the Ségou Region of Mali. The administrative center (chef-lieu) is the town of San.

The cercle is divided into 25 communes:

- Baramandougou
- Dah
- Diakourouna
- Diéli
- Djéguena
- Fion
- Kaniegué
- Karaba
- Kassorola
- Kava
- Moribila
- N'Goa
- N'Torosso
- Niamana
- Niasso
- Ouolon
- San
- Siadougou
- Somo
- Sourountouna
- Sy
- Téné
- Teneni
- Tourakolomba
- Waki
