= Nipania =

Nipania may refer to:

- Nipania, Begusarai, village in Bihar, India
- Nipania, Purnia, village in Bihar, India
