= Harsai stupa =

Ancient Buddhist stupa in Begusarai district, Bihar, India

Harsai Stupa
- Location in Bihar, India Harsai stupa (Bihar)

Religion
- Affiliation: Buddhism

Location
- Location: near Garhpura village, Begusarai district, Bihar, India
- Administration: Archaeological Survey of India (Patna circle)
- Coordinates: 25.55°N 86.28°E

Architecture
- Type: Stupa
- Style: Buddhist

Specifications
- Height (max): Main stupa: approx. 65 feet (20 m)
- Materials: Sun-dried clay lumps, mud mortar, gravel, burnt bricks

The Harsai stupa is an ancient Buddhist stupa and archaeological site located in Begusarai district of Indian state of Bihar. It is one of the four clay-built stupas located at the site which are collectively called the Harsai stupas.

== Location ==
The Harsai stupa is situated on the southern edge of the Kanwar Lake Bird Sanctuary, near Garhpura village in Begusarai district, approximately a few kilometres away from the lake. The site is located close to Jaimangla Garh Temple an ancient temple dedicated to the goddess Chandi Mangla Devi.

The stupa complex consists of four stupas arranged around a central larger stupa, with three smaller stupas positioned at equal distances in the north, south, and west directions.

== History and significance ==
The site was discovered by the Patna circle of the Archaeological Survey of India (ASI) in 2010 and formally announced in 2012.

According to Buddhist texts after Gautama Buddha was cremated , his relics were distributed among janpadas and republics. Each buried their share of relics in stupas specially built to serve as markers of the Buddha's physical presence and teachings. To date, archaeologists have identified six of these original stupas. S.K. Manjul, the superintending archaeologist, noted that the physical appearance of the stupa and the use of mud lumps in its construction suggest it could be one of the eight original stupas housing the Buddha's corporeal relics. If confirmed, it would be the seventh such stupa discovered and would represent "the ASI's biggest discovery," according to Manjul.

=== Identification with the Sin-Che Temple ===
Some sources identify the Harsai stupa with the site of the Sin-Che Temple, a Buddhist monastery visited by the Chinese traveller Hieun-Tsang (Xuanzang) in the 7th century CE. The temple is said to have been located north of the Ganges and was held in high esteem by Buddhist pilgrims. Several Chinese and Korean monks, including Sin-Chiu (Charita-varma), Chi-Hing, and Hwui-Lun (Prajnavarma), are recorded to have lived and died at the Sin-Che Temple.

== Architecture ==
The main stupa is constructed primarily from sun-dried clay lumps fixed with mud mortar, later strengthened with layers of gravel and burnt bricks. This type of construction, known as "Bajralepit" (clay-built) stupa, is referred to in the Mahavamsa an ancient Buddhist chronicle. Such mud stupas were common only in the early phases of Buddhism before architectural techniques became more advanced.

The main stupa has a height of approximately 65 feet (20 metres) and a diameter of about 360 feet (110 metres). Excavations at the site have yielded Northern Black Polished Ware (NBPW) potsherds, indicating an antiquity dating prior to 200 BCE. The site has yielded a collection of fine black stone images from the Pala period, including representations of Varaha, Badri Narayan, Ganga, and Shiva-Parvati. These sculptures are considered among the best examples of the plastic art of the Eastern School of Medieval Sculpture (c. 800–1200 CE).

== Threat and preservation ==
The Harsai stupa is currently in a poor state of preservation. Local residents have damaged parts of the structure to extend agricultural fields and to mine clay for construction purposes. S.K. Manjul noted that "some local people have damaged a part of it to extend the agriculture fields. The stupa is lying neglected as it is unprotected till date."

The main stupa has been cut almost in half by locals presumably searching for construction landfill material. However, one of the smaller southern stupas has remained relatively intact due to thick vegetation cover.

The ASI has initiated efforts to preserve the stupas and has granted an excavation licence to an archaeologist from the Patna Circle to undertake excavation work. The ASI's Central Advisory Board of Archaeology has approved the excavation. The Bihar government has also been approached to develop the heritage site as a tourist destination.

According to a 2022 report in Dainik Jagran, the Harsai Stupa is among several ancient heritage sites in Begusarai district whose existence is on the verge of extinction due to neglect and lack of maintenance.
