= Meghaul =

Meghaul Meghaul Phethiya
- Village
- Location in Bihar, India Meghaul (India)
- Coordinates: 25.6561°N 86.0257°E
- Country: India
- State: Bihar
- District: Begusarai

Area
  - Total: 9.3 km^{2} (3.6 sq mi)
- Elevation: 42 m (138 ft)

Population (2011)
  - Total: 10,274
  - Density: 1,100/km^{2} (2,900/sq mi)

Languages
  - Official: Maithili, Hindi
- Time zone: UTC+5:30 (IST)
- PIN: 848202
- Telephone code: 06243
- ISO 3166 code: IN-BR
- Sex ratio: 950:1000 ♂/♀

Meghaul is a panchayat village of Khodabandpur taluk, Begusarai district, in the Indian state of Bihar.

The village is situated 36.5 km from Begusarai and 12.1 km from Rosera. Meghaul is located on the bank of the Burhi Gandak River and 10 km west of Kanwar Lake Bird Sanctuary which is a Ramsar Convention Wetland receiving hundreds of thousands of migrating birds each year.

== Demographics ==
As of the 2011 Indian census, Meghaul had a population of 10,274. Males constituted 50.4% of the population and females 49.6%. Meghaul had an average literacy rate of 80%, higher than the national average of 59.5%. Male literacy was 85%, and female literacy was 75%. 15% of the population was under 6 years of age.

The local languages include Maithili, Hindi and English.

=== Religion ===
The village hosts three temples.

== Economy ==
Wheat, rice, and sugar cane are the main crops of Meghaul. Meghaul Pethiya is a Haat bazaar. The Village has a twice weekly market.

== Transport ==
The state highway SH 55 connecting the Begusarai and Samastipur districts of Bihar, passes through Meghaul. The nearest railway station is in Rosera.

== Education ==
Meghaul has three primary schools, one middle school, two high schools and M.R.D. College.

== History ==
Meghaul is also known for its freedom fighters. During Freedom movement there were many taken part in freedom movement, and martyred for the Country Including Shahid Radha Pd Singh, Lt. Jivaksh Mishra and Lt. Ganesh Datt Sharma. etc. BooK-Azadi ki Ladai Jo Meghaul mei Ladi gaye By: Chandra shekar Chaudhary (Historian, Teacher, Reporter)
