= Daudpur kothi =

Daudpur kothi manaspuri
- colony
- Country: India
- State: Bihar
- District: Muzaffarpur

Government
  - Type: Municipal Corporation
  - Body: Mayor

Languages
  - Official: Maithili, Hindi
- Time zone: UTC+5:30 (IST)
- Vehicle registration: BR-06
- Coastline: 0 kilometres (0 mi)

Daudpur kothi is a colony in Muzaffarpur district, Bihar state, India.

== Details ==
It is situated at the bank of river Budhi gandak and also having an ancient shiv temple. Muzaffarpur Institute of Technology (MIT) is situated near the village.

A sewarage treatment plant was constructed in 2022.
