= Kamdev Singh =

Indian criminal

Kamdev Singh (also spelled Kamdeo Singh; born c. 1930 – died 18 April 1980) was a gangster, smuggler and mafia strongman from Begusarai district of Bihar, India. He was an anti-communist and for the locals of his hometown, he has been called a "Robin Hood" and "God". Kamdev Singh was hired by various politicians for booth capturing. His son is Rajkumar Singh.Known locally as “Samrat” (Emperor) and dubbed the “Pablo Escobar of Bihar,” he led an extensive criminal network spanning smuggling, dacoity, and political muscle-power operations. He was notorious for his anti-communist activities and was widely hired by politicians for booth capturing during elections.

== Early life and background ==
Kamdev Singh was born circa 1930 into a Bhumihar family in the village of Naya Gaon, Matihani block, Begusarai district, Bihar. Little is recorded about his formal education; contemporaries describe him as semi-literate, having begun work as a cowherd before turning to crime.

== Rise as dacoit and criminal career ==
Singh began his criminal career in the late 1950s as a dacoit operating in northern Bihar. By the late 1960s, he had established a powerful smuggling network that extended from Begusarai into neighboring districts, Uttar Pradesh, Nepal, and major Indian cities such as Kolkata and Mumbai. He amassed firearms and “maintained an army of gunners, mercenaries, and smugglers,” and by 1979 carried a ₹10,000 police bounty on his head.

== Anti-communist activities and political influence ==
In the late 1960s and 1970s, Begusarai was known as the “Leningrad of the East” for its powerful Communist Party of India (CPI) presence. Singh emerged as the leading anti-communist enforcer in the region, engaging in violent confrontations that left dozens dead. His supporters viewed him as a Robin Hood-like figure opposing CPI excesses, while critics decried his use of terror to influence local politics.

He was frequently hired by political parties to carry out booth-capturing during elections, a practice well-documented in studies of money and muscle power in Indian politics.

== Booth capturing and electoral roles ==
Singh's reputation for decisive action made him a go-to enforcer for local Congress and allied candidates. In the 1969 Bihar Legislative Assembly election, he forcibly seized as many as 34 polling booths in Matihani, ensuring a decisive victory for his patrons.

== Encounters and death ==
On 15 May 1980, after multiple failed raids and tip-offs by corrupt officers, a combined force of Bihar Police and CRPF conducted a silent night operation in Nayagaon. Accounts state that an alert Singh fled toward the Ganges but was shot and killed in an ensuing encounter; his body, discovered on the riverbank the next morning, bore wounds consistent with both gunfire and injuries from a fall. His son, Rajkumar Singh, later alleged that the police “wrongly targeted” his father and that his death was an extrajudicial killing.

== Personal life and legacy ==
Singh was survived by his wife and two sons. His elder son, Rajkumar Singh, entered electoral politics as an LJP candidate from Matihani in 2020, invoking his father's legacy among voters.

== In popular culture ==
Santosh Singh's Kamdev Singh: The Original Godfather of Indian Politics (2022) chronicles his life and times.

Multiple documentaries and regional news segments have been produced, highlighting his dual image as a feared don and a folk-hero.

== See also ==
- Begusarai (municipality)
- Organised crime in India
- When Crime Pays: Money and Muscle in Indian Politics
