= Bandwar =

- Village
- Location in Bihar, India Bandwar (India)
- Coordinates: 25.5009°N 86.1606°E
- Country: India
- State: Bihar
- District: Begusarai
- Region: Mithila
- Elevation: 45 m (148 ft)

Population
  - Total: 12,943

Bandwar, also called Vandwar or Banduar, is a village in Begusarai district of Bihar, a state in India.

== Geography ==
It is located in the Indo-Gangetic Plain region of India.

The only river that flows through the village is the Burhi Gandak River.

Due to the river being prone to floods, a levee, referred to as “Bandh” (Hindi: बांध) by local residents, has been constructed parallel to the Burhi Gandak River to prevent flooding of the adjoining countryside.

== Transport ==
A bridge on the Burhi Gandak River called the Chhatauna Bridge connects the village to other villages on the northern bank of the river.

== Demographics ==
The village has 12,943 residents, 6,796 male and 6,147 female.

53 percent of the village is illiterate.
