= Barauni Refinery =

Oil refinery in Bihar, India

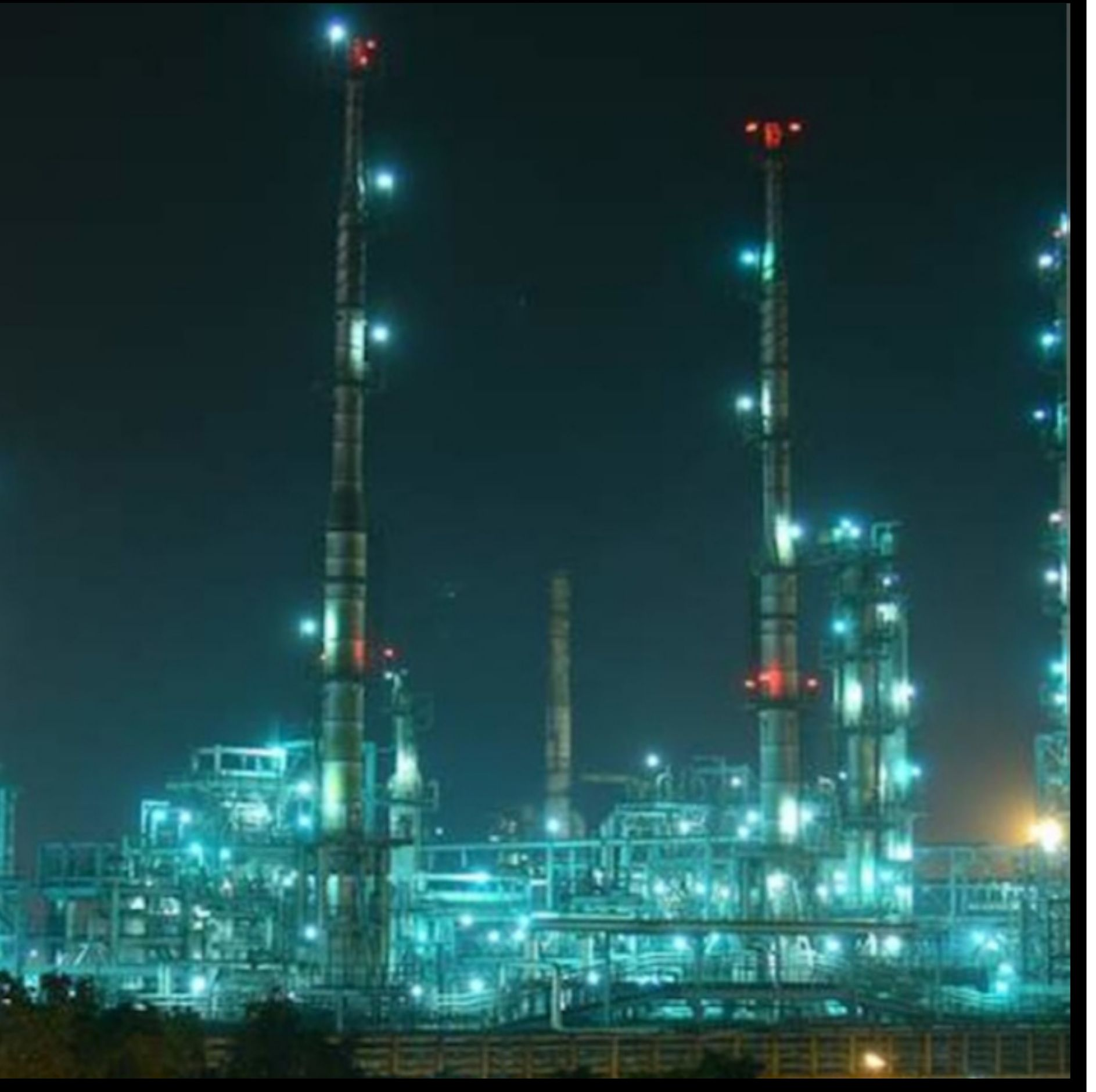
- Barauni Refinery
- Interactive map of Barauni Refinery
- Location: Barauni, Begusarai, Bihar, India; 25.434°N 86.059°E

Refinery details
- Operator: IOCL
- Owner: Indian Oil Corporation Limited
- Opened: 1964; 62 years ago
- Capacity: 6 metric tons (5.9 long tons; 6.6 short tons) per year
- Website: https://iocl.com/barauni-refinery

Barauni Refinery is an oil refinery located in Barauni city at Begusarai district in the state of Bihar, operated by Indian Oil Corporation (IOCL). It was the dream project of Shri Krishna Singh the first chief minister of Bihar. It was built in collaboration with the Soviet Union, with limited participation from Romania, at a cost of Rs. 49.4 crores and went on stream in July 1964. The initial capacity of 1 million tonnes per year was expanded to 3 million tonnes per year by 1969. The present capacity of this refinery is 6.100 million tonnes per year. Indian Oil Corporation has been constructing to expand its capacity from 6 million tonnes per year to 9 million tonnes per year at the cost of $1.94 billion.

== Moving to green fuel ==
Barauni Refinery was earmarked for its operational excellence in 2009 after winning the TPM excellence award in Category A. State-of-art eco-friendly technologies enabled the Refinery to produce environment-friendly green fuels complying with international standards. Barauni Refinery fully switched over to BS-III diesel w.e.f 1 June 2010. 1st batch of BS-III petrol was dispatched through Barauni Kanpur Pipeline (BKPL) on 13 August 2010. Bihar & Jharkhand was declared BS-III compliant since September 2010. New units like NHDT and ISOM for Motor Spirit Quality up-gradation were added in 2010.

== Expansion ==
Expansion of Processing Capacity

Current capacity: 6 million tonnes per annum (MMTPA)

Post-redevelopment target: 9 MMTPA (+50%).

Project approval: Board approved ₹13,779 crore in Jan 2020; budget later revised to ₹16,724 crore by Apr 2025 due to increased equipment costs.

New Units & Upgrades

The expansion includes installation of a comprehensive slate of grassroots and upgraded units:

9 MMTPA atmospheric-vacuum distillation unit (replacing three old units)

Diesel hydrotreating, naphtha hydrotreating, isomerization, and hydrocracking units

Sulphur recovery, hydrogen generation, propylene recovery, LPG treatment, amine/rinsing systems.

200 ktpa polypropylene plant to feed downstream industries.

Contracts have been awarded to major engineering firms:

McDermott for diesel hydrotreating, naphtha units

Technip Energies for hydrocracker and gas treatment.

Maire Tecnimont for the polypropylene plant (200 ktpa)

== Product profile ==
Barauni Refinery is primarily a diesel producing Refinery with over 54% of its product mix as HSD. Other products include kerosene, petrol, LPG, Naptha, Raw Petroleum Coke (RPC), sulphur and bitumen. It caters to fuel demands of the states of Bihar, West Bengal, Uttar Pradesh, Jharkhand and Madhya Pradesh. Nepal Oil Corporation also sources its fuel including, LPG from Barauni Refinery. Currently, over 42% of the dispatch of products at Barauni Refinery is through road followed by pipelines and rail.

== See also ==
- Barauni IOC Township
- Indian Oil
