= Khartari, Bihar =

Village in Bihar, India

Khartari
- Village
- Location within Bihar Location within India
- Coordinates: 26°40′21″N 85°03′07″E
- Country: India
- State: Bihar
- District: East Champaran
- Block: Chiraia

Government
  - Type: Sarpanch

Area
  - Total: 23.78 km^{2} (9.18 sq mi)
- Elevation: 69 m (226 ft)

Population (2011)
  - Total: 38,978
  - Density: 1,639/km^{2} (4,245/sq mi)

Languages
  - Official: Hindi, Maithili
- Time zone: UTC+5:30 (IST)
- PIN: 845415
- STD code: 06252
- Vehicle registration: BR-05

Khartari is a village in Chiraia Block, East Champaran District, Bihar, India. It is located near the border with Nepal, about 14 kilometres east of the district capital Motihari, and 3 kilometres southwest of the block capital Chiraia. In 2011, its population is 38,978.

== Geography ==
Khartari is situated to the north of Burhi Gandak River. It is bounded by Mishrauliya to the north, Katkuian to the east, Tharghatwa to the south, and Sopgarha to the west. It covers an area of 2378 hectares.

== Demographics ==
According to the 2011 Census of India, Khartari has a total of 8,183 households. Out of the 38,978 residents, 20,632 are male and 18,346 are female. The total literacy rate is 35.17%, with 8,801 of the male population and 4,909 of the female population being literate.
