= Matihani =

Matihani may refer to:

- Matihani, India
- Matihani, Nepal
- Matihani (Vidhan Sabha constituency), in Begusarai District
