= Ajhaur =

Coordinates: 25°30′59″N 86°10′41″E

Ajhaur अझौर Ajhour
- Village
- Country: India
- State: Bihar
- District: Begusarai
- Block: Begusarai

Government
  - Type: Gram Panchayat
  - Body: Ajhaur Gram Panchayat

Area
  - Total: 3.84 km^{2} (1.48 sq mi)

Population (2011)
  - Total: 7,365
  - Density: 1,920/km^{2} (4,970/sq mi)

Languages
  - Official: Hindi, Urdu
  - Regional: Maithili
- Time zone: UTC+5:30 (IST)
- PIN: 851131

Ajhaur (also spelled Ajhour) is a village in the Begusarai Block of Begusarai district in the state of Bihar, India. It is administered by the Ajhaur Gram Panchayat.

== Geography ==
The total geographical area of Ajhaur is 384 hectares, or 3.84 km². The village lies in the Gangetic plains of Bihar.

== Demographics ==
As per the 2011 Census of India, Ajhaur had a total population of 7,365 people residing in 1,429 households. Of this, 3,868 were males and 3,497 were females. The population of children aged 0–6 years was 1,320. The average sex ratio was 904 and the child sex ratio was 905.

Ajhaur had a literacy rate of 59.82%. Male literacy was 69.86% and female literacy was 48.71%.

Scheduled Castes constituted 1,093 persons, or 14.8% of the total population. There were no Scheduled Tribes in the village.

== Administration ==
The village is administered by a Gram Panchayat.

== Economy ==
Of the total population, 2,139 persons were engaged in work activities, of whom 85.3% described their work as main work. The economy of Begusarai district is predominantly agrarian. Major crops grown in the region include paddy, wheat, maize, and pulses.

== Infrastructure ==
Ajhaur has a post office with the PIN code 851131.
