= Chamtha =

Village in Bihar, India

- Village
- Location within Bihar Location within India
- Coordinates: 25°34′02″N 85°46′56″E
- Country: India
- State: Bihar
- District: Begusarai
- Block: Bachhwara

Government
  - Type: Sarpanch

Area
  - Total: 19.35 km^{2} (7.47 sq mi)
- Elevation: 50 m (160 ft)

Population (2011)
  - Total: 32,434
  - Density: 1,676/km^{2} (4,341/sq mi)

Languages
  - Common: Hindi
- Time zone: UTC+5:30 (IST)
- PIN: 851111
- STD code: 06243
- Vehicle registration: BR-09

Chamtha is a village in the state of Bihar, India. It is Spread in mainly Begusarai & Samastipur near Vidyapatinagar and Begusarai District, about 38 kilometres northwest of the district seat Begusarai. The village's population was 32,434 as of 2011.

== Geography ==
Chamtha is situated on the north bank of the Ganges River, with the National Highway 122B passing through its north. The village covers an area of 1935 hectares.

== Demographics ==
According to the 2011 Census of India, Chamtha had a total population of 32,434, of which 17,129 were males and 15,305 were females. The working population comprised 34.76% of the overall population. The average literacy rate stood at 41%, with 8,169 of the male residents and 5,128 of the female residents being literate.
