= Madhubani ghat =

Coordinates: 26°34′59″N 85°02′07″E

Madhubani Ghat is a small riverside village in Motihari, Bihar, India. The village, located on the banks of the Sikrahna River, has lush green farms and orchards of mangoes and litchi.

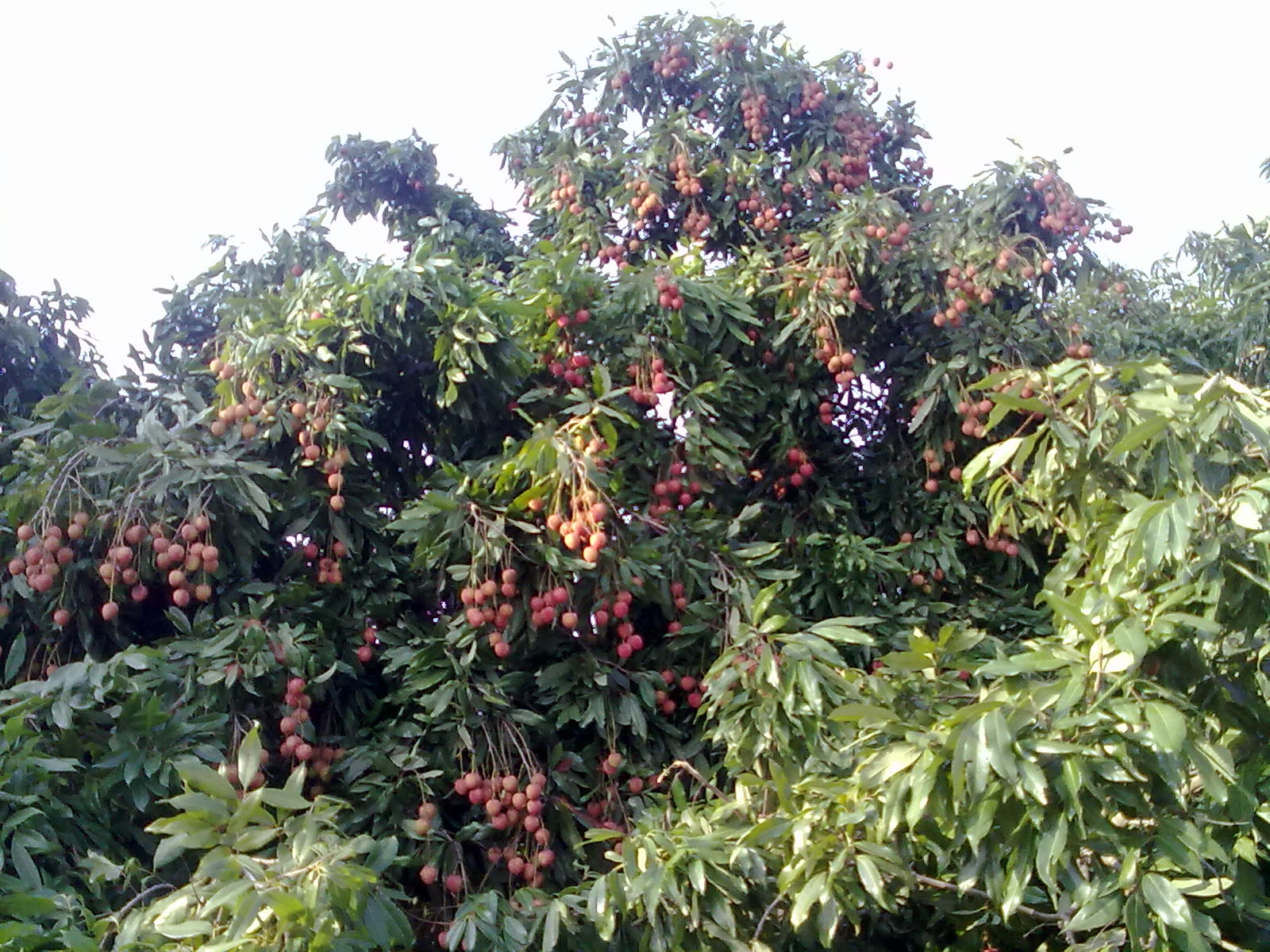
A tree laden with The Litchi fruit at Madhubani Ghat, Motihari

.
