= Begusarai district =

District in Bihar, India

- District
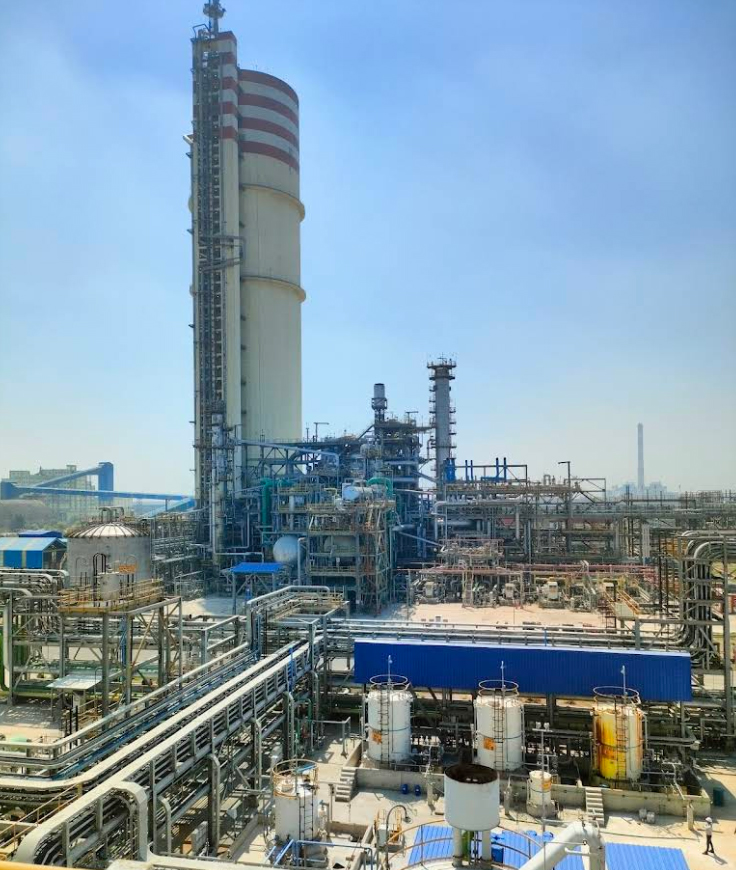
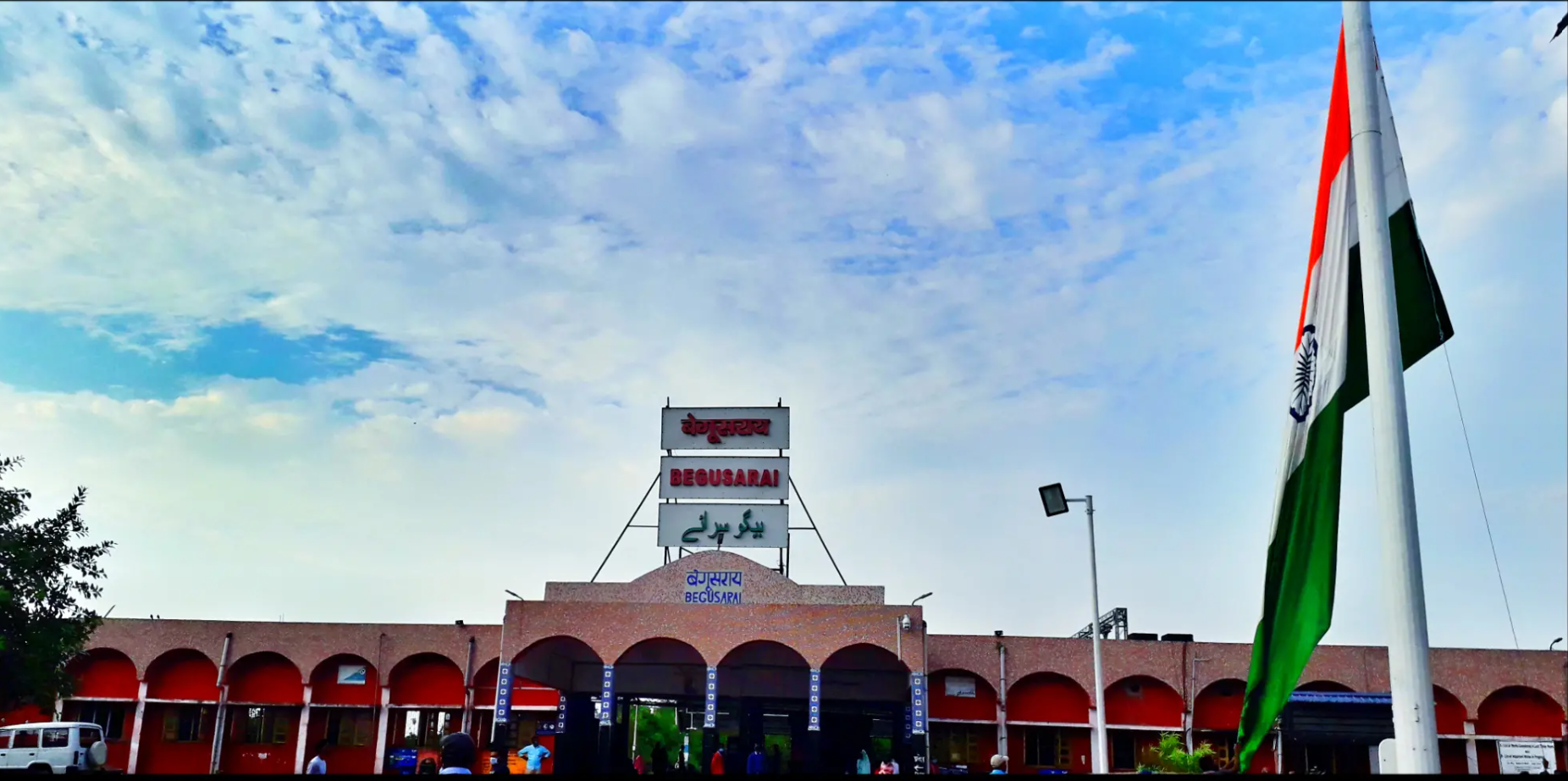
- HURL barauni Begusarai railway station
- Interactive map of Begusarai district
- Coordinates (Begusarai): 25.4167°N 86.1333°E
- Country: India
- State: Bihar
- Region: Mithila
- Division: Munger
- Established: 1870
- District: 2 October 1972
- Headquarters: Begusarai

Government
  - District Magistrate: Shrikant Shastri
  - MP, Begusarai Lok Sabha: Giriraj Singh

Area
  - Total: 1,918 km^{2} (741 sq mi)

Population (2011)
  - Total: 2,970,541
  - Density: 1,549/km^{2} (4,011/sq mi)

Demographics
  - Literacy: 63.87 per cent
  - Sex ratio: 894

Language
  - Official: Hindi
  - Additional official: Urdu
  - Other recognised: Maithili
- Time zone: UTC+05:30 (IST)
- Vehicle registration: BR-09
- Major highways: NH 31, NH 28
- Average annual precipitation: 1384 mm
- Website: begusarai.nic.in

Begusarai district is one of the thirty-eight districts of the Indian state of Bihar. The city of Begusarai is its administrative headquarters and is part of the Munger division.

== History ==
Begusarai was established in 1870 as part of Munger district. In 1972, it was given district status.

== Geography ==
Begusarai district occupies an area of 1,918 square kilometres (741 sq mi). The district lies on the northern bank of the river Ganges. Begusarai district is a part of Munger division. It is located at latitudes 25.15N & 25.45N and longitudes 85.45E & 86.36E. The Ganges river separates Begusarai district from Patna district and Munger district.

=== Flora and fauna ===
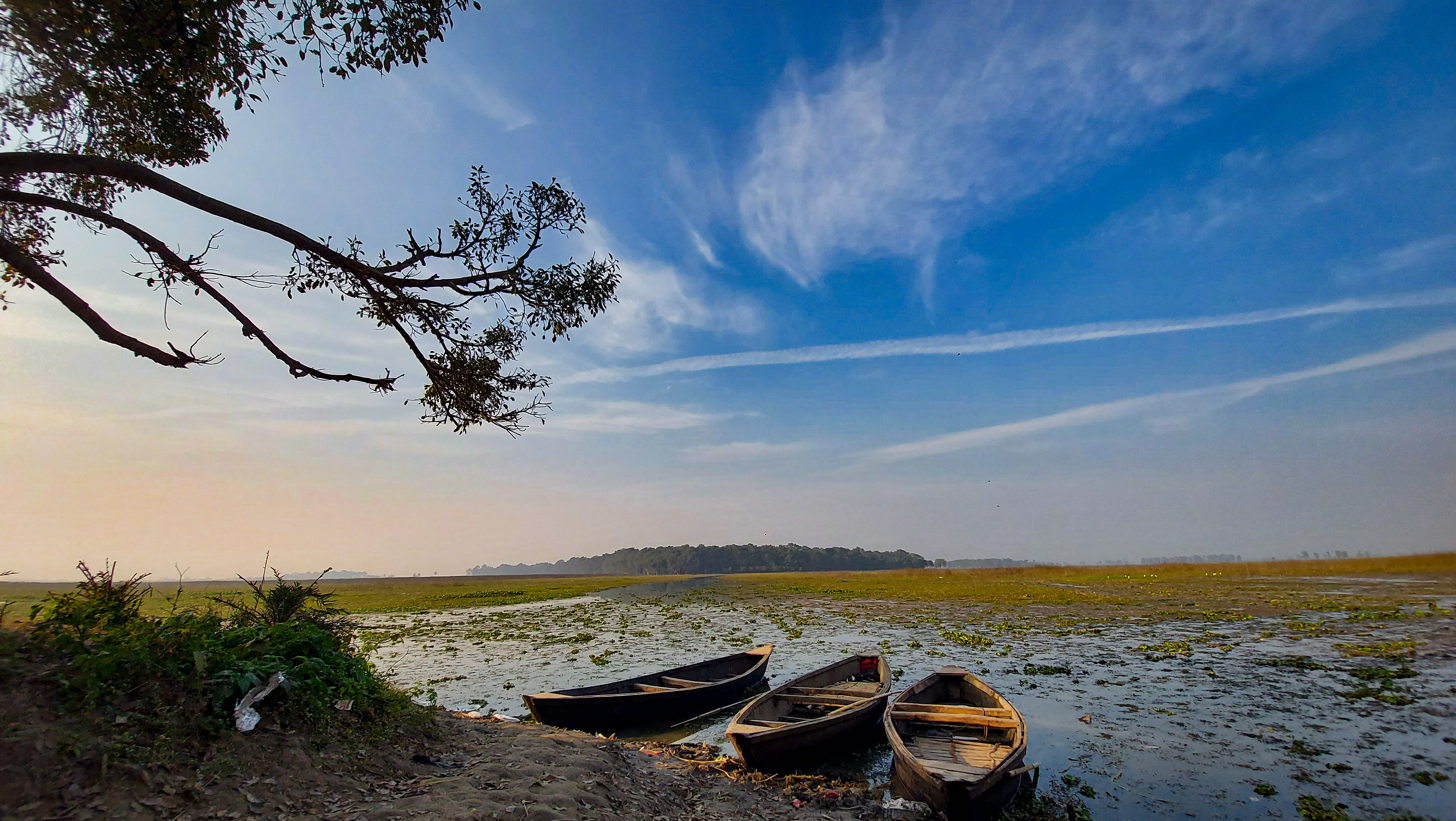
Kanwar Lake

In 1989 Begusarai district became home to the Kanwar Lake Bird Sanctuary, which has an area of 63 km^{2} (24.3 mi^{2}). It is Asia's largest freshwater oxbow lake. In November 2020, the Ministry of Environment, Forest and Climate Change (MoEFCC) declared it the first Ramsar site in Bihar.

== Demographics ==
Historical population
Year	Pop.	±% p.a.
1901	575,455	—
1911	593,470	+0.31%
1921	564,328	−0.50%
1931	635,456	+1.19%
1941	718,390	+1.23%
1951	793,942	+1.00%
1961	954,333	+1.86%
1971	1,147,429	+1.86%
1981	1,456,343	+2.41%
1991	1,814,773	+2.22%
2001	2,349,366	+2.62%
2011	2,970,541	+2.37%

Religions in Begusarai district (2011)
Religion	Percent
Hinduism	86.00%
Islam	13.70%
Other or not stated	0.30%

According to the 2011 census Begusarai district has a population of 2,970,541, roughly equal to the nation of Armenia or the US state of Mississippi. This gives it a ranking of 128th in India (out of a total of 640). The district has a population density of 1,540 inhabitants per square kilometre (4,000/sq mi). Its population growth rate over the decade 2001-2011 was 26.44%. Begusarai has a sex ratio of 895 females for every 1000 males, and a literacy rate of 63.87%. 19.18% of the population lives in urban areas. Scheduled Castes and Scheduled Tribes make up 14.55% and 0.05% of the population respectively.

Languages of Begusarai district (2011)
1. Hindi (79.8%)
2. Urdu (9.53%)
3. 'Other' Hindi (7.94%)
4. Maithili (2.43%)
5. Others (0.33%)

At the time of the 2011 Census of India, 79.77% of the population in the district spoke Hindi, 9.53% Urdu and 2.43% Maithili as their first language. 7.94% of the population spoke 'Others' under Hindi.

== Politics ==
District	No.	Constituency	Name	Party	Alliance	Remarks
Begusarai	141	Cheria-Bariarpur	Sushil Kumar	JD(U)	NDA	
Begusarai	142	Bachhwara	Surendra Mehata	BJP	NDA	Minister
Begusarai	143	Teghra	Rajnish Kumar Singh	BJP	NDA	
Begusarai	144	Matihani	Narendra Kumar Singh	RJD	MGB	
Begusarai	145	Sahebpur Kamal	Sadanand Yadav	RJD	MGB	
Begusarai	146	Begusarai	Kundan Kumar	BJP	NDA	
Begusarai	147	Bakhri (SC)	Sanjay Paswan	LJP(RV)	NDA	

Current Member of Legislative council Bihar Legislative Council (Begusarai-Khagaria)

S.no.	Name	Party	Alliance
1.	Rajiv Kumar	Indian National Congress	MGB

== Administration ==
=== Subdivisions ===
- Begusarai
- Manjhaul
- Teghra
- Balia
- Bakhari(SC)
- Baghi

=== Cities and towns ===
- Bakhri
- Ballia
- Barauni IOC Township
- Barauni
- Begusarai
- Bihat
- Cheria Bariyarpur
- Manjhaul
- Mansurchak
- Matihani
- Teghra

=== Villages ===
- Bachwara
- Bandwar
- Ganpataul
- Manjhaul
- Mansurchak
- Meghaul
- Mohanpur
- Nayatol
- Nipaniya
- Parihara
- Sahebpur Kamal
- Simaria
- Sonma, Begusarai

== Economy ==
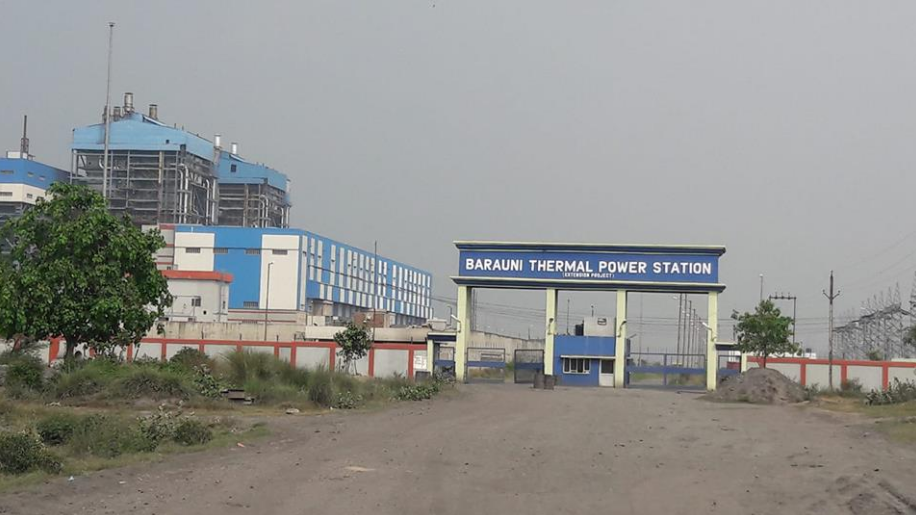
Barauni Thermal Power Station

Barauni is the major industrial town in the district. It has big industries like Barauni Refinery, Barauni Thermal Power Station, Urvarak Nagar Barauni, Garhara electric locomotive shed and Pepsi bottling plant. Shri Krishna Singh wanted to build an industrial corridor from Begusarai-Bakhtiyarpur-Fatuha, so he looked to construct Rajendra Setu in Mokama. Begusarai is one of the largest milk-consuming districts in India. Sudha dairy plant is also one of the biggest exporters of milk all over Bihar.

Agriculture is the mainstay of the economy. The main crops of the Begusarai district are oilseeds, anise seeds, tobacco, jutes, potatoes, red chilis, tomatoes, and rape-seeds. In fruits, Begusarai has recently become a major contributor in producing litchi, mango, guava, and banana. Basil leaves and pearl farming are also present in the local area.

Even today, only the Barauni refinery contributes around Rs 500 crore (5,000,000,000) to the state exchequer yearly. Begusarai also has an inactive airport in Begusarai Ulao. Begusarai had the second highest per capita income in the financial year of 2019–2020 in Bihar, after Patna.

== Transportation ==
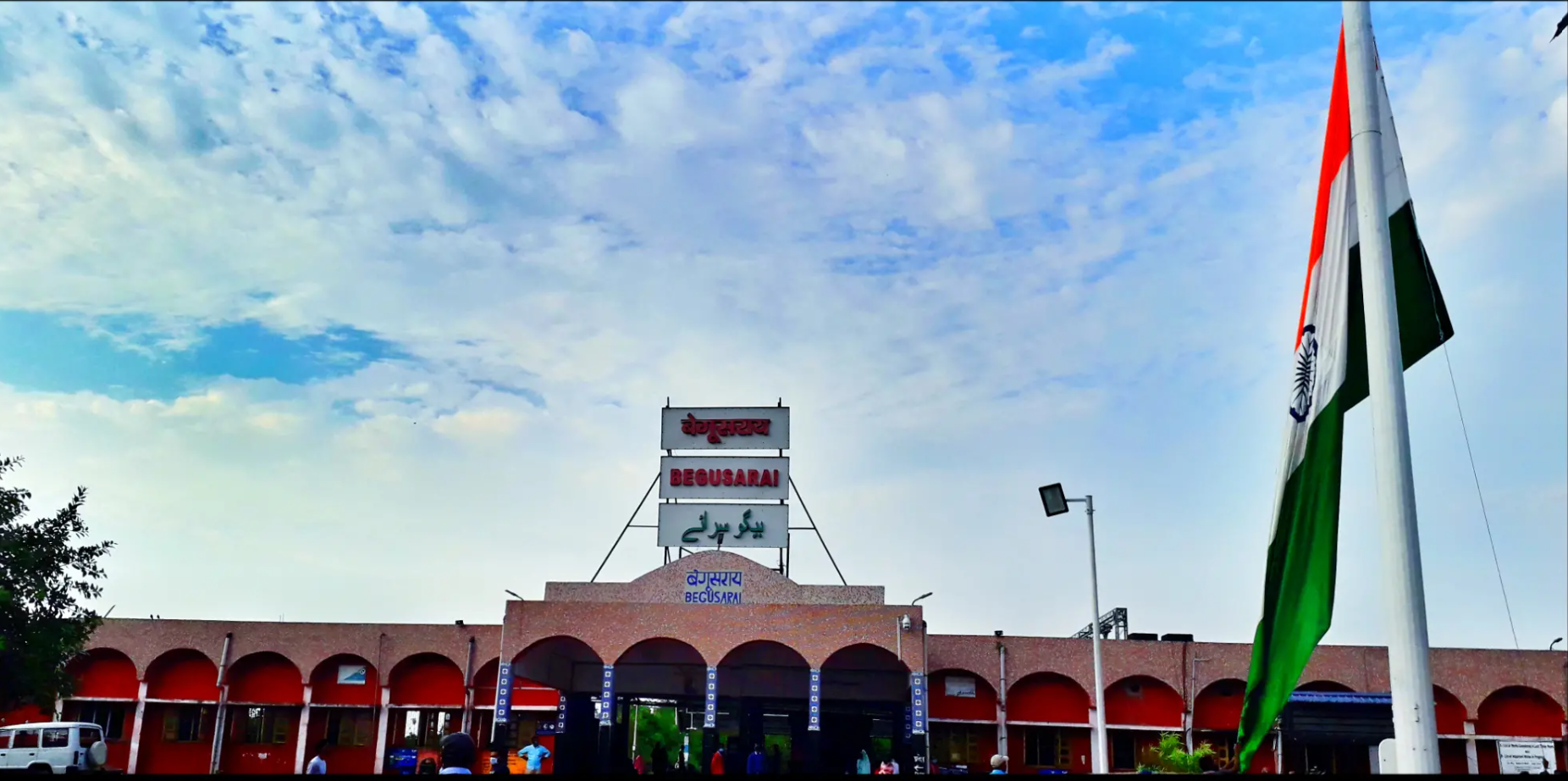
Begusarai railway station

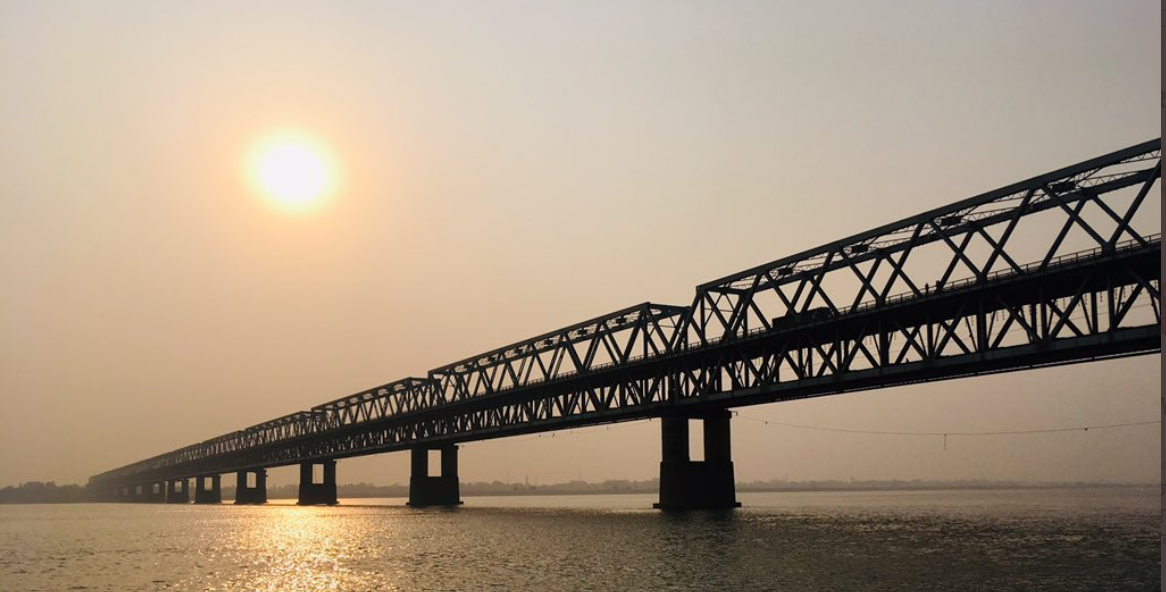
Rajendra Setu

=== Railways ===
Barauni Junction is one of the important station in Bihar. It is a major junction and is connected to India's main cities of New Delhi, Kolkata, Mumbai and Chennai via broad gauge routes. Begusarai railway station is located in Begusarai city. Another major Station is New Barauni Junction who is connected Patna, Katihar,Mokama and Lakhisarai rail routes.

=== Roads ===
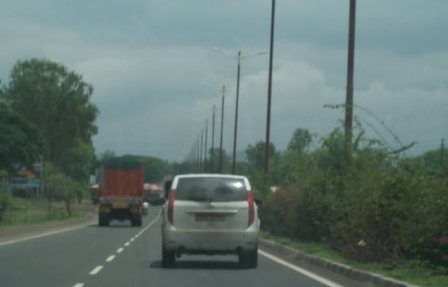
NH-31 is passing through Begusarai district.

National Highway 28 (New National Highway 122 ) starts at Barauni and leads to Lucknow via Muzaffarpur. National Highway 31 passes through the district and leads to Guwahati. Both National Highways have junctions here. It is also called Assam Road. Many small city buses pass through here. Begusarai district also has Rajendra Setu on Ganges near Simariya, which was the first railcum road bridge in independent India on the river Ganges. There is Six Lane Road Cable Bridge on the Ganges in simaria ghat .it is also known is Barauni-Mokama six lane cable bridge. It was completed by December 2024.

== Tourist places ==
Begusarai district in Bihar offers diverse attractions ranging from ecological wonders to historic temples and museums.

=== Naulakha Temple ===
Naulakha Temple, established in 1953 by Saint Mahavir Das, stands on the banks of the Ganges in Bishanpur village, about 12 km northeast of Begusarai town. Constructed entirely of local sandstone, the temple features a distinctive nine-pinnacled (nava-lakha) shikhara, from which it derives its name. Its sanctum houses idols of Radha–Krishna, Shiva, and Durga, and the annual Purnima fair each Kartik (October–November) attracts thousands of devotees for ritual baths (Ganga Snan) and kirtans. The Bihar government maintains the precinct, which offers panoramic river vistas and features recently installed ghats for improved pilgrim access.

=== Muniswar Mandir ===
Located in the heart of Begusarai town near the municipal park, Muniswar Mandir is an ancient Shiva temple dating to the Pāla period (8th–12th CE). Archaeological fragments—such as lotus-mandala carvings and lakhuri-tile sections—suggest successive renovations, most recently in 1978. The temple hosts large crowds during Mahashivaratri, when local priests perform all-night jagrans and processions. Conservation efforts by the Bihar State Directorate of Archaeology and Museums in 2019 stabilised its earthen plinth and restored weathered bas-reliefs.

=== Jaimangla Garh Temple ===
Jaimangla Garh, also known as Jai Mangla Dham, is an island temple dedicated to Chandi Mangla Devi on the southern edge of Kanwar Lake (25 km from Begusarai). Archaeological excavations have unearthed coins dating to 721 CE and Buddhist sculptures, indicating origins in the Pala period, with significant 15th-century renovations by Oinwar patrons. The temple is a focal point during Navratri and Chhath, and is maintained by the Begusarai district administration.

=== Radheshyam Temple ===
The Radheshyam Temple (also referred to as Radha Shyam Mandir) is a historic 19th-century Hindu shrine located in Begusarai district of Indian state of Bihar.the temple is dedicated to the Hindu deities Radha and Krishna. It is regionally notable for its unique architectural fusion and its collection of traditional murals.

=== Kanwar Lake Bird Sanctuary ===
The Kanwar Lake Bird Sanctuary (locally Kabartal) is Asia’s largest freshwater oxbow wetland, situated 22 km northwest of Begusarai town in Manjhaul block. Covering approximately 2,620 ha, it was designated Bihar’s first Ramsar site in November 2020. Formed by a meander of the Burhi Gandak River, the sanctuary hosts over 394 animal species—including 221 avian species (58 migratory)—and five critically endangered vultures such as the red-headed vulture (Sarcogyps calvus) and the sociable lapwing (Vanellus gregarius). Seasonal flooding during the monsoon mitigates regional inundation, while dry-season recession supports agriculture. Ecotourists visit for boating and birdwatching from October to March, when migratory populations peak.

=== Harsai stupa ===
The Harsai stupa is an ancient Buddhist stupa situated on the southern edge of the Kanwar Lake Bird Sanctuary, near Garhpura village in Begusarai district, approximately a few kilometres away from the lake. The site is located close to Jaimangla Garh Temple an ancient temple dedicated to the goddess Chandi Mangla Devi. The stupa complex consists of four stupas arranged around a central larger stupa, with three smaller stupas positioned at equal distances in the north, south, and west directions.

=== Rajendra Setu (Simaria Bridge) ===
Rajendra Setu, also known as Simaria Bridge, is the first rail-cum-road bridge across the Ganges in independent India. Commissioned in May 1959 and spanning 2 km between Mokama (Patna district) and Simaria Ghat (Begusarai district), it carries a single-line rail track above and a two-lane roadway below. Designed by Sir M. Visvesvaraya’s team and built by Braithwaite, Burn & Jessop Construction Company, the bridge pioneered steel-girder construction in India. In 2019, NHAI restricted heavy vehicles due to structural wear, prompting ongoing rehabilitation work. A parallel six-lane highway bridge (Mokama–Begusarai) is slated for completion in early 2025.

=== Begusarai Museum ===
Situated near Lohaiya Nagar railway crossing, the Begusarai Museum (est. 1981) exhibits over 1,500 artefacts, from Ashokan-era coins to British-period paintings. Highlights include a life-size Buddha statue dating to the Gupta era and a 17th-century Persian manuscript. The museum’s recent catalogue (2022) organised items by period and type, aiding researchers in regional art history. Educational workshops are held quarterly in collaboration with Patna University’s Department of History.

=== Kashi Prasad Jaiswal Archaeological Museum ===
Founded in September 1947 at Ganesh Dutt College by Radha Krishna Choudhary, this college-run museum preserves regional archaeological finds—Buddhist chaitya-doorframes, Pāla-era Navagraha sculptures, and Mauryan-period terracottas. Its 2018 conservation survey led to the restoration of 120 artefacts and the installation of climate-controlled display cases. Open to the public on weekdays, it serves as a key resource for the study of Mithila’s material culture.

=== Simaria Ghat ===
Simaria Ghat on the north bank of the Ganges, 12 km from Begusarai, is revered as the Kartik Kalpavas site established by King Janaka in Treta Yuga. The annual Simaria Mela (October–November) draws hundreds of thousands of pilgrims for sacred baths, devotional discourses, and the offering of diyas. A 2023 state initiative upgraded the ghats with reinforced steps, LED lighting, and erosion-control barriers.

== Education ==
Rashtrakavi Ramdhari Singh Dinkar College of Engineering (RRSDCE) was laid on 22 December 2013 by Nitish Kumar, paving way for the eighth government engineering college in Bihar. G D College is a notable undergraduate and postgraduate degree college of the district.

Colleges:

- Rashtrakavi Ramdhari Singh Dinkar College of Engineering (A government engineering college)
- Ganesh Dutt College (Affiliated with Lalit Narayan Mithila University)
- Shree Krishna Mahila College (A women's college in Begusarai)
- RCS College
- Government Polytechnic Barauni
- BP Inter College Begusarai (Inter college level education)
- A.P.M. College Barauni

Schools:

- Doon Public School
- BR DAV Public School
- St. Joseph Public School
- St. Paul's School
- Kendriya Vidyalaya
- St. Jude's Vidyalaya
- Mount Litera Zee School, Begusarai
- Delhi Public School, Begusarai
- Sarvoday Vidyalaya Begusarai
- Carmel School Begusarai
- Paramhans Public School
- Paramhans Play School

== Notable people ==
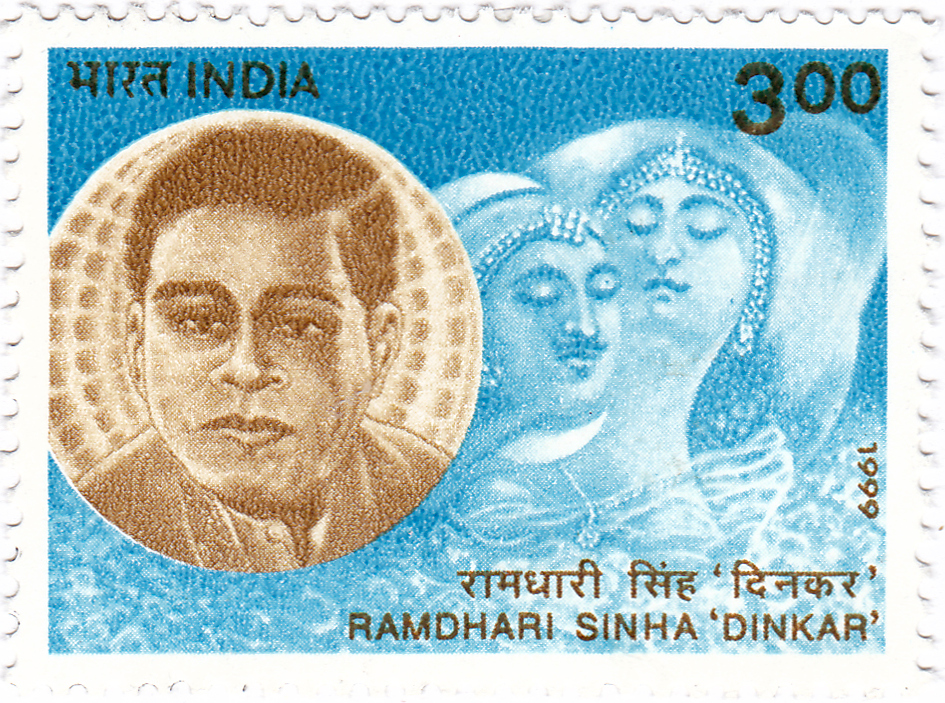
Ramdhari Singh Dinkar

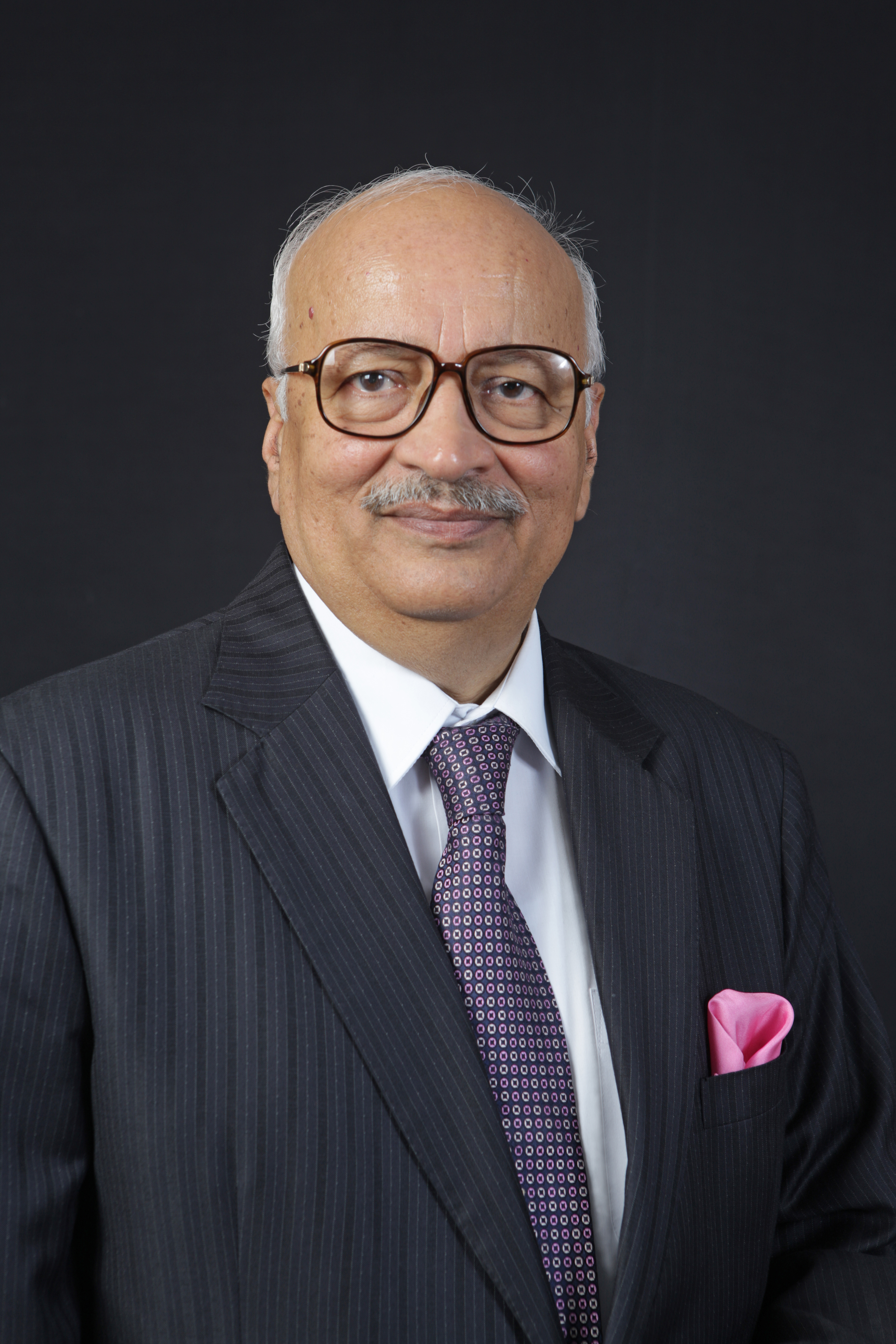
Balmiki Prasad Singh

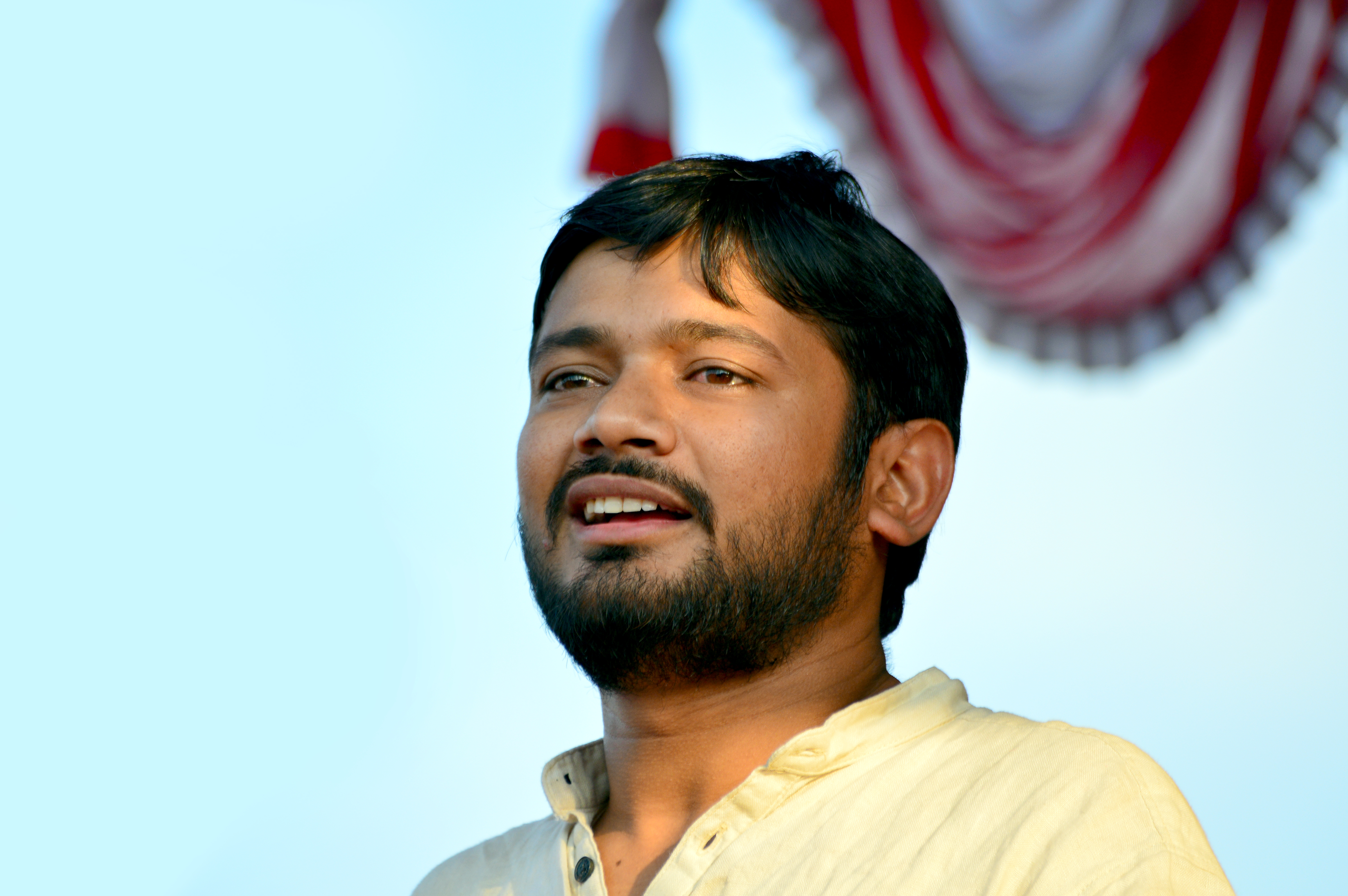
Kanhaiya Kumar

- Ajit Anjum, journalist from Begusarai
- Radha Krishna Choudhary, Indian historian, thinker, and writer
- Ramdhari Singh Dinkar, poet, essayist, patriot and academic, Padma Bhushan receiver.
- Shaibal Gupta, Indian social scientist and political economist, Padma Shri receiver, founder of Asian Development Research Institute
- Kranti Prakash Jha, Bollywood actor
- Sriti Jha, TV actress
- Kanhaiya Kumar, politician and leader of the Indian National Congress (former AISF and CPI leader)
- Ramendra Kumar, National President of AITUC
- Manoj Kumar Mishra, known for his work on quantum chemistry
- Lalita Kumari, Politician, leader of Communist Party of India and Bihar Mahila Samaj
- Mathura Prasad Mishra, member of parliament (1st, 2nd and 3rd Lok Sabha)
- Shyam Nandan Prasad Mishra, Minister of External Affairs (India) of India
- Kajal Raghwani, one of the highest paid Bhojpuri actress
- Rafiuddin Raz, Pakistani poet
- Kaiser Rehan, Taekwondo athlete
- Krishna Sahi, State Minister of Education (India), Minister of Water Resources, River Development and Ganga Rejuvenation, Minister of Commerce and Industry (India), Minister of Heavy Industries, Minister of Consumer Affairs, Food and Public Distribution
- Ram Sharan Sharma, historian
- Balmiki Prasad Singh, former Governor of Sikkim
- Bhola Singh, politician, leader of Bharatiya Janta Party (former Member of Parliament from Begusarai Lok Sabha constituency)
- Chandrasekhar Singh, known for turning Begusarai into a communist bastion
- Kamdev Singh, well known gangster from Begusarai
- Lalit Vijay Singh, State Minister of Defence (India)
- Rakesh Sinha, politician, professor and Member of Parliament, Rajya Sabha
- Shatrughan Prasad Singh, Politician, leader of Communist Party of India (former Member of Parliament from Balia, Bihar Lok Sabha constituency
