= Radheshyam Temple, Begusarai =

Temple in Bihar, India

- Location in Begusarai, Bihar

Religion
- Affiliation: Hinduism
- District: Begusarai
- Deity: Radhakrishna

Location
- Location: Ulao
- State: Bihar
- Country: India
- Interactive map of Radheshyam Temple, Begusarai
- Coordinates: 25°41′56″N 86°09′43″E

Architecture
- Creator: Shyam Kumari
- Completed: 1857
- Height (max): 65 ft (20m)

The Radheshyam Temple (also referred to as Radha Shyam Mandir) is a historic 19th-century Hindu shrine located in Begusarai district of the Indian state of Bihar. The temple is dedicated to the Hindu deities Radha and Krishna. It is regionally notable for its unique architectural fusion and its collection of traditional murals.

== History ==
The Radheshyam temple was commissioned in 1857 by Shyam Kumari, a female noblewoman of the Ulaw estate, a zamindari estate which ruled Ulao and adjacent areas.

== Architecture ==
The Radheshyam Temple is architecturally notable for its fusion of traditional Indian temple design and colonial-era elements, a style frequently described as Indo-Western. The entire structure is built on a raised masonry platform that sits roughly one metre above the surrounding ground level. Visitors enter the complex through a wide, prominent gateway that opens into a spacious outer courtyard measuring 34 metres by 27 metres, which serves as an open approach to the main mandapa (hall). The core temple building itself stands as a rectangular structure with dimensions of approximately 28 metres in length, 18 metres in width, and 20 metres in height. Its exterior showcases colonial design influences through its tall, arched doorways and window alignments, while the rear of the building retains a traditional shikhara (spire) characteristic of North Indian temple architecture.

=== Interior murals and styles ===
The walls inside the temple have murals depicting stories from the Mahabharata and the Ramayana and from the mythology of Radha and Krishna. The artwork draws heavily from the Rajasthani Shekhawati school of painting, a style that is rarely found in the eastern plains of Bihar. This artistic hybrid is attributed to mid-19th-century patronage, where estate owners or migrating merchant families commissioned artists trained in Upper India to decorate local structures.

== Location ==
The temple is situated along National Highway 31, in Ulao, a village situated approximately 5 to 6 kilometres west of the district headquarters of Begusarai in Bihar, India. The nearest railway station is Barauni Junction while the nearest airport is Jayparaksh Narayan Airport in Patna.
