= Mohanpur, Begusarai =

Mohanpur
- Village
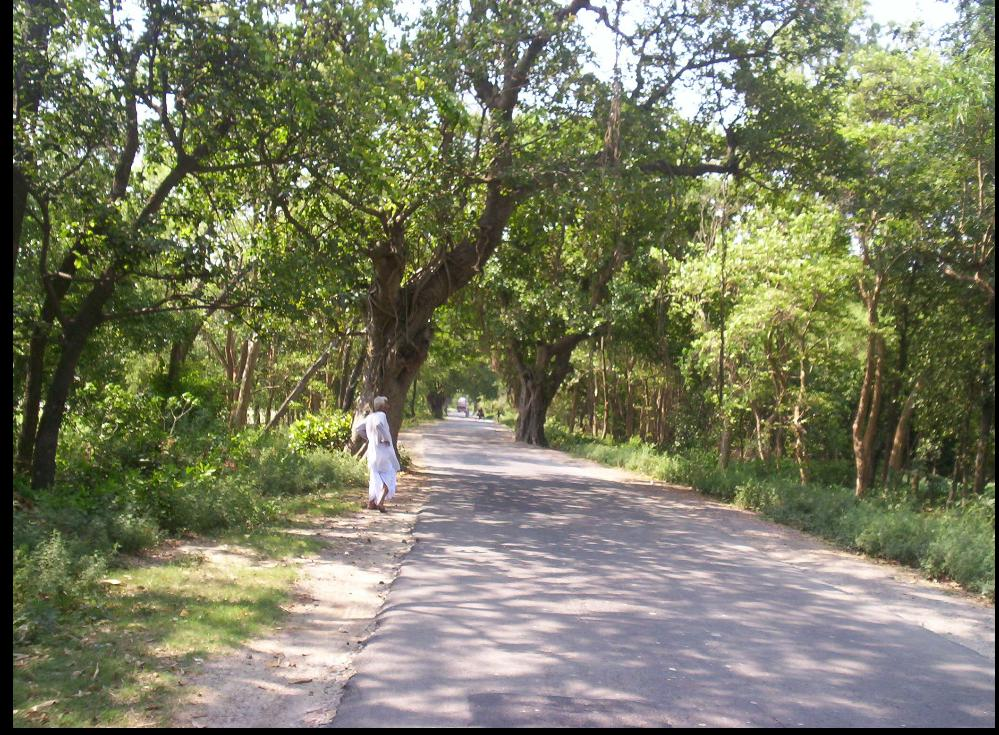
- The road to Mohanpur, going towards Begusarai (south of Mohanpur) from Manjhaul (north of Mohanpur)
- Country: India
- State: Bihar
- District: Begusarai

Languages
  - Official: Maithili, Hindi
- Time zone: UTC+5:30 (IST)
- PIN: 851131
- Telephone code: MANJHAUL EXC
- Nearest city: Begusarai

Mohanpur is a medium populated village in Begusarai District, India. It is situated on the banks of Burhi Gandak. The nearest sub-divisions are Manjhaul and Begusarai. It has a population of 1329 as per 2011 census.

Mohanpur has one High School, one Middle School and two Primary schools. Economy is mainly agrarian. This village also boasts a hospital, bank and a public library. Sant Kumar Sahani, Headmaster of the High School Kharmauli, Kharmauli, Birpur, Begusarai, won a best teacher National award in 2023.
