= Sonma, Begusarai =

Village in Begusarai, Bihar

Sonma सोनमा
- village
- Sonma Pranpur railway station

- Location in Bihar, India Sonma (India)
- Coordinates: 25°37′36.07″N 86°12′56.45″E
- Country: India
- State: Bihar
- Region: Mithila
- District: Begusarai

Population (2011)
  - Total: 15,000

Languages
  - Official: Maithili, Hindi
- Time zone: UTC+5:30 (IST)
- PIN CODE: 848201
- Telephone code: 06243
- Vehicle registration: BR-09

Sonma is a big village at Garhpura block, in Begusarai district, Bihar, India. It is also sometimes written as "Sonwan". Its neighbours are Mauji Harisingh, Kumharson, Simri, and Bagmati River. The population of the village is around 15,000. It is the second-largest village in Garhpura block. Presently Mukhiya of this village is Shri Ramkaran Paswan.

A road passes through the village which connects Bakhri and Garhpura. Dasin Lake is famous for its fisheries in the region.
