= Kaiser Rehan =

Indian taekwondo athlete

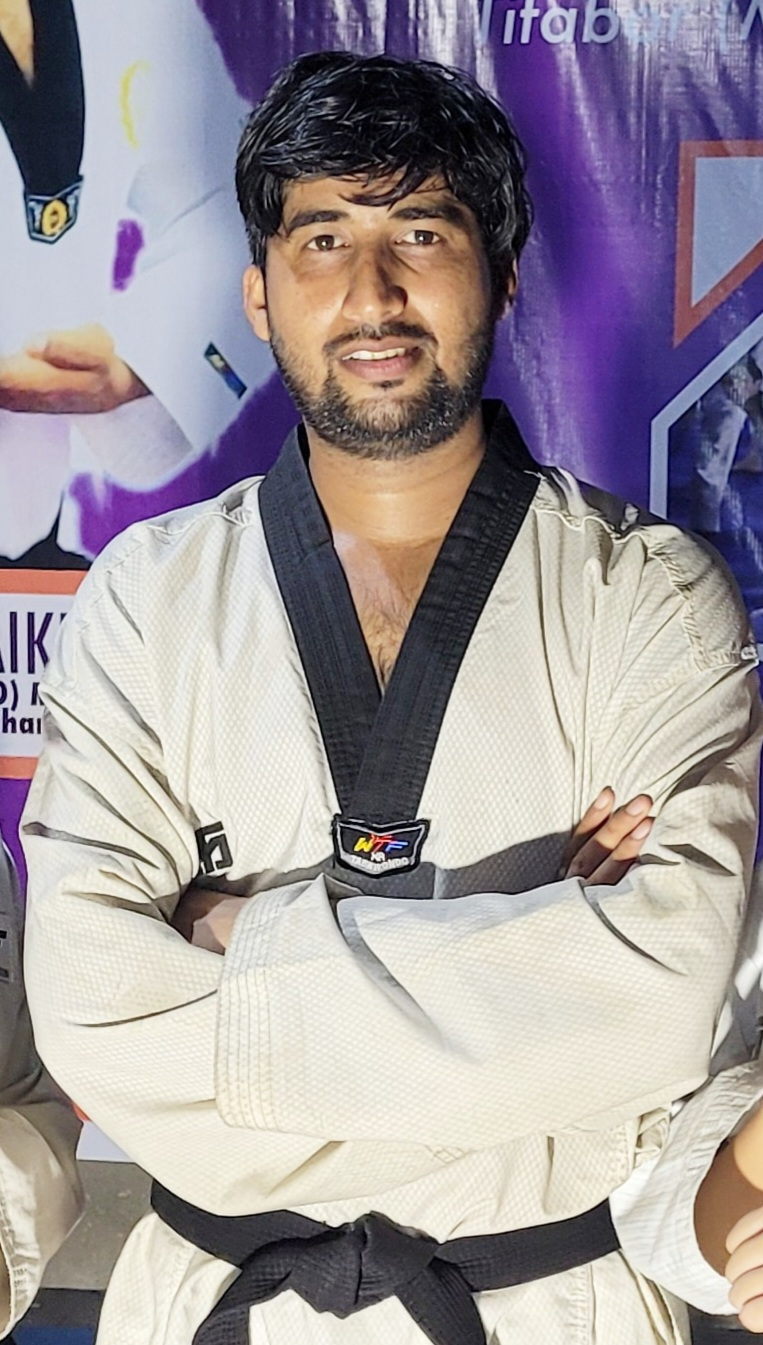
- Kaiser Rehan in September 2021

Personal information
- Nationality: Indian
- Born: Ninga, Begusarai district, Bihar, India
- Occupation(s): Taekwondo athlete, coach, referee
- Years active: 2009–present

Sport
- Sport: Taekwondo

Kaiser Rehan is an Indian Taekwondo practitioner, coach, and referee from Begusarai, Bihar. He has participated in several national and international Taekwondo events and has promoted the sport among youth in Bihar. He was born in Ninga village, Begusarai district, Bihar. He began training in Taekwondo in 2009 and later pursued advanced training under certified Taekwondo instructors.

In January 2024, he received the IDSO Award for his contribution to Taekwondo and sports promotion at the Indian Dojang Sports Authority Festival and Championship held at Talkatora Stadium, New Delhi. In 2019, he won a gold medal at a Taekwondo championship held in Thailand. Apart from competing, Rehan has worked as a Taekwondo coach and referee at state and district-level tournaments in Bihar.

According to media reports, Rehan has represented India in events abroad, including one in Bangkok, He continues to train young athletes in Taekwondo and is active in developing grassroots sports activities in his home state.
