= Begusarai Museum =

Coordinates: 25.4254°N 86.1387°E

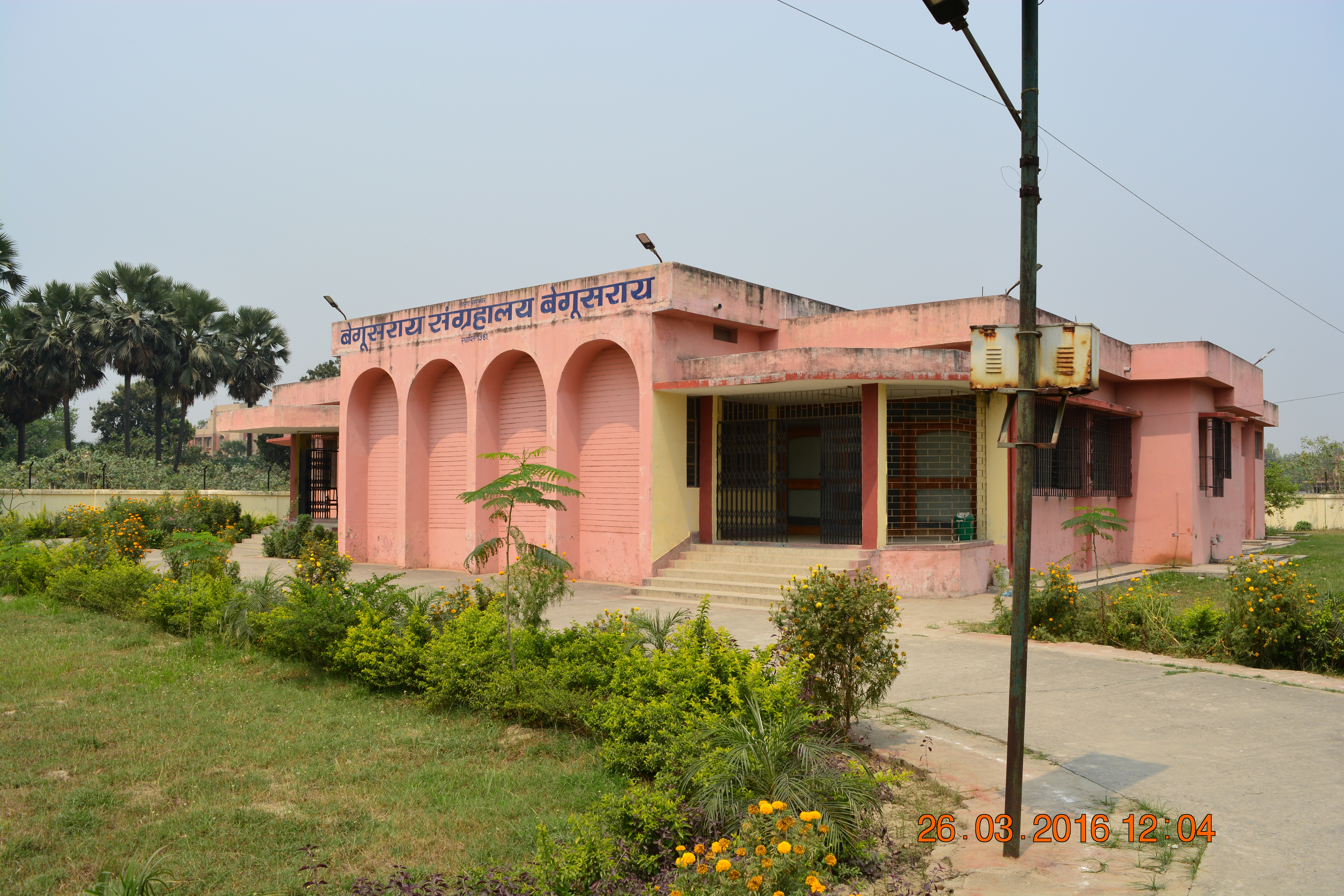
- Established: 1981
- Location: C4GQ+6HQ, Lohaiya Nagar, Begusarai
- Type: Museum
- Director: Jay Prakash Narayan Singh
- Public transit access: Begusarai Railway Station

Begusarai Museum or Begusarai Sangrahlaya is a museum in Begusarai district of Indian state of Bihar. The museum consists of artifacts from Buddhist, Maurya and Mughal period. It is open on all days except Sunday.

Some of main attractions of the museum are the 2nd-century goddess Kali idols and preserved manuscripts. It also has valuable collections of ancient coins; most of them date back to c. 200 BCE. The museum also has a collection of ancient terracotta toys.

== History ==
Being a part of historical Mithila region Begusarai has a rich history and heritage. The museum was established in 1981. Until 2005 the museum was run in a rented house in Ashok Nagar. In 2005 upon initiative of District Officer Sandeep Paundrik the museum was shifted to a huge building in Lohaiya Nagar.

== Collections ==
- Argillaceous Idols: The museum has collection of idols from Maurya period to Pala period. It also has remains of soil made utensils and several terracotta toys.
- Pottery: The pottery remains date back to the Stone Age. It also has pottery remains from Medieval period of Indian History.
- Coins: The museum has a big collection of approximately 5,000 coins from Ancient to Early modern period. It includes silver coins of Pala Empire, 13th- and 14th-century coins of Muslim rulers and coins of British Raj.

The museum also has collection of preserved manuscripts.

== Administration ==
The museum is administered by the state government of Bihar. The current museum director is Jay Prakash Narayan Singh.
