= Naulakha Mandir, Begusarai =

Temple in Bihar, India

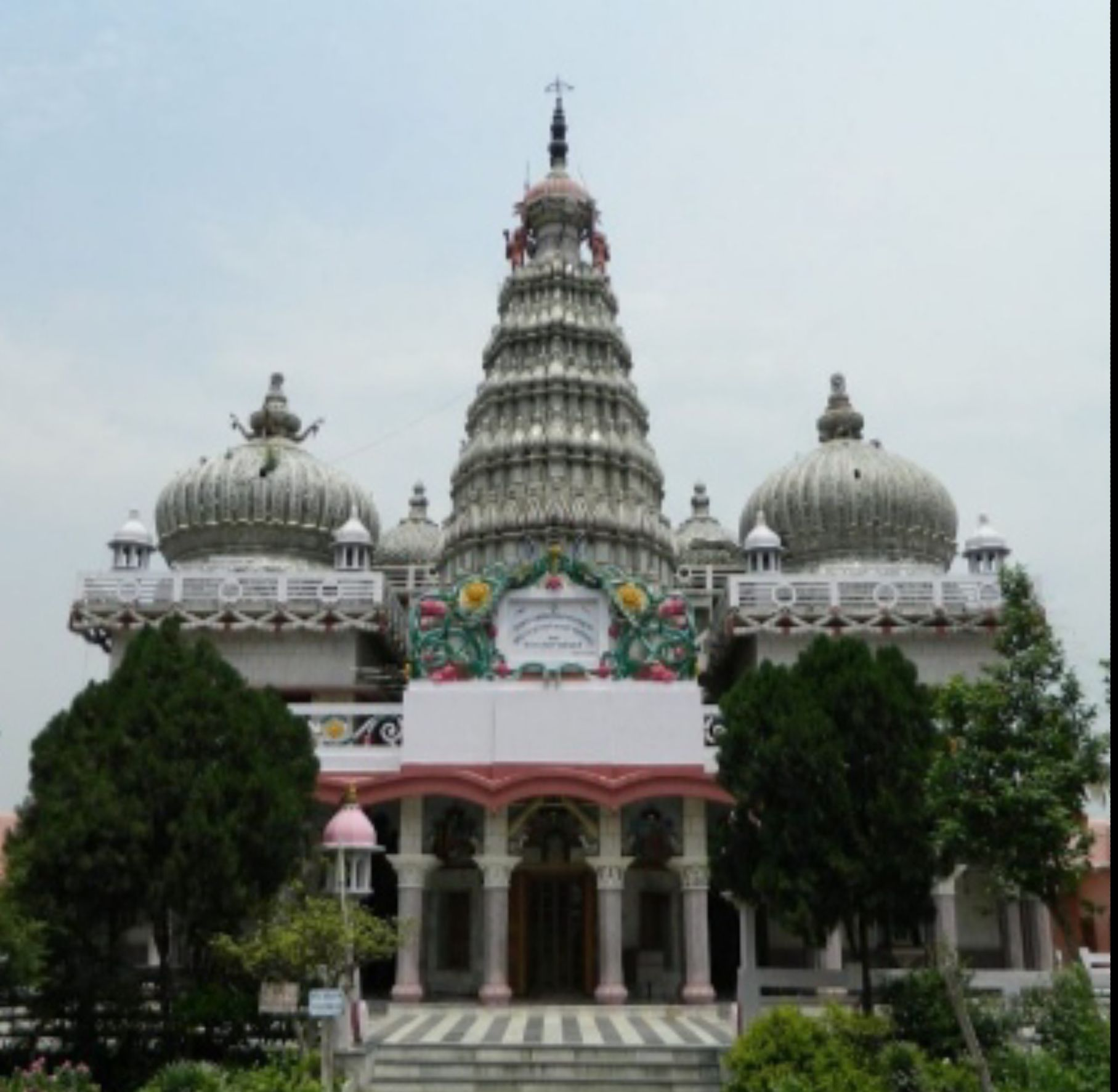

- Location in Begusarai, Bihar

Religion
- Affiliation: Hinduism
- District: Begusarai
- Deity: Rama, Sita

Location
- Location: Bishanpur
- State: Bihar
- Country: India
- Interactive map of Naulakha Mandir, Begusarai
- Coordinates: 25°24′33″N 86°08′58″E

Architecture
- Creator: Mahavir Das
- Completed: 1953
- Materials: Marble and Glass

The Naulakha Mandir is a Hindu shrine located in Begusarai district of Bihar. It is primarily dedicated to Hindu deity Rama and his consort Sita.

== Location ==
The temple is located in Bishanpur area of Begusarai. The nearest railway station is the Begusarai railway station while the nearest airport is Jay Prakash Narayan Airport in Patna. It is well connected by roads to Begusarai city.

== History ==
The Naulakha Mandir was built by Saint Mahavir Das in 1953. The temple derives its name Naulakha from the fact that it took a total of INR 9 lakhs ('naulakh') for its construction over a period of 10 years.

== Description ==
The temple has been constructed primarily from Rajasthani marble , it also uses decorative glass from Kolkata. The temple's architectural design reflects the traditional Nagara architecture of North Indian temples. It also houses idols of Radhakrishna, Shiva and Durga. The temple compound is adorned with beautiful plants and ponds.
