= Nipania, Purnia =

Nipania
- village
- Location in Bihar, India Nipania (India)
- Coordinates: 25°50′16″N 87°11′48″E
- Country: India
- State: Bihar
- District: Purnia

Population
  - Total: 5,000

Languages
  - Official: Maithili, Hindi
- Time zone: UTC+5:30 (IST)
- PIN: 854202
- Telephone code: 916467
- ISO 3166 code: IN-BR
- Nearest city: Banmankhi
- Literacy: 55%
- Lok Sabha constituency: Purnia
- Vidhan Sabha constituency: Banmankhi
- Climate: Pleasant (Köppen)

Nipania is a village situated in south of Banmankhi, in the Purnia district of Bihar, India. It has a population of approximately 5,000.

It is well connected through road by Banmankhi and Dhamdaha subdivisions; Banmankhi Junction is the nearest railway station. It has a middle school and a Shri Krishna temple. Nearby villages include Magurjan, Aliganj, Gangaili, Maharajganj and Baraina. It has a gram panchayat. The village is largely agricultural, with maize, jute, and banana. There is also a new chowk called Shri Krishna Chowk, and a market is growing near the chowk. Every year residents celebrate the Krishna Janmashtami festival with full of enthusiasm.
