= Jaimangla Garh Temple =

Hindu Temple

Coordinates: 25°35′32″N 86°09′41″E

- Jaimangla dham
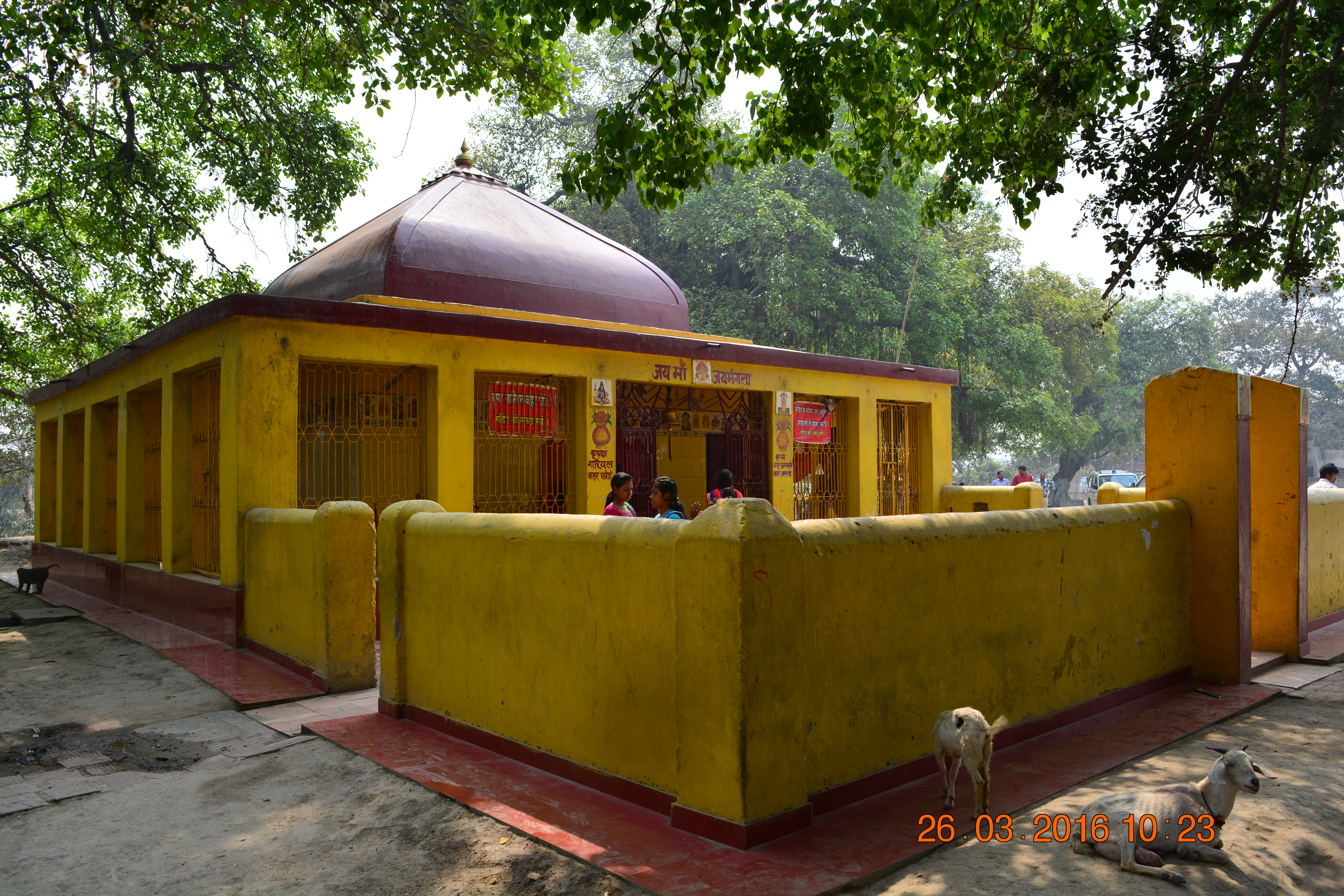

Religion
- Affiliation: Hinduism
- District: Begusarai
- Deity: Chandi Mangla Devi
- Festivals: Navratri, Jaimangla Utsav, Chhath
- Status: Active

Location
- Location: Manjhaul
- State: Bihar
- Country: India
- Interactive map of Jaimangla Garh Temple

Jaimangla Garh Temple is an ancient historical Hindu temple in Begusarai district of Bihar state of India. It is surrounded by Kanwar Lake. It is dedicated to the goddess Chandi Mangla Devi. An idol of the goddess is enshrined there.

== Accessibility ==
Nearest railway station is Begusarai railway station.Nearest Airport is Loknayak Jay Prakash Narayan Airport in Patna, Bihar

== Mythology ==
According to Hindu mythology, the temple is one of the Shakta pithas, the places where body parts of goddess Sati fell upon the Earth.

== History ==
The temple is believed to have been founded by the rulers of the Pala Dynasty in the ninth or tenth Century CE, although ancient remains found here date back to the period of the Lord Buddha. Archaeological remains have been found at the southern gate. Archaeological excavations have unearthed coins dating to 721 CE and Buddhist sculptures indicating Pala period origins. Structures belonging to the Gupta dynasty (400-600 AD) have been identified, confirmed by an earthen seal. The temple underwent significant renovations in the 15th century under the Oinwar patrons.

== Significance ==
The temple is considered one of the 51 Shakti Peethas of India. Surrounding archaeological mounds are still being studied for artifacts from the Buddhist era.

== Kanwar Jheel ==
The temple is located on an island within Kanwar Lake — Bihar's first Ramsar site and Asia's largest freshwater oxbow lake, covering 2,620 hectares and hosting over 221 bird species.

== Festivals ==
- Navratri
- Jaimangla Utsav
- Chhath
- Mahashivaratri
