= Barauni Refinery Township =

- Town
- Seal

- Location in Bihar, India
- Coordinates: 25.419799°N 86.109755°E
- Country: India
- State: Bihar
- District: Begusarai
- City: Barauni
- Established: 1960s
- Founder: Shri Krishna Sinha

Population (2001)
  - Total: 13,825

Languages
  - Official: Maithili, Hindi
- Time zone: UTC+5:30 (IST)
- Telephone code: 06243
- Lok Sabha constituency: Begusarai

Barauni Refinery Township is a census town at Barauni in Begusarai district in the state of Bihar, India.

== Demographics ==
As of 2001 India census, Barauni IOC Township had a population of 13,825. Males constitute 55% of the population and females 45%. Barauni IOC Township has an average literacy rate of 82%, higher than the national average of 59.5%; with 58% of the males and 42% of females literate. 13% of the population is under 6 years of age.
