= Matihani, Bihar =

Matihani(मटिहानी )
- village
- Location in Bihar, India Matihani(मटिहानी ) (India)
- Coordinates: 25.359539°N 86.182594°E
- Country: India
- State: Bihar
- District: Begusarai
- Region: Mithila
- Established: Settlement known since Mughal Emperor Akbar time.

Government
  - Type: Block, gram panchayat, Municipality, State constituency.

Population
  - Total: >5,000

Languages
  - Official: Maithili, Hindi
- Time zone: UTC+5:30 (IST)
- Postal code: 851129
- ISO 3166 code: IN-BR

Matihani is a village situated near the Ganges River, in the Begusarai district, Bihar state, India.

In the autumn of 2022, a new bridge was approved, connecting Matihani with the town of Sambho, also in the Begusarai district. Although the bridge proposal would normally have been rejected under construction codes related to its proximity to existing bridges, the proposal was approved given the travel benefits for states bordering Nepal and connecting the northern and southern areas of Bihar.

Festivals of Matihani :

1. Holi Festival of color Holi is celebrated in its full charm. First day there is Holi is played with 'Mud', second day its small Holi, third day main Holi and last day again small Holi. 7 wells present in the village is cleaned before Holi. On the day of main Holi, color is filled in these wells from which colored water is taken in different bucket and hauj. Villagers then divide themselves in two groups and enjoy this festival. it is followed by prize ceremony and song and dance which is continued till evening.

2. Chhath: Another important festival of this place. Before Chhath villagers align together irrespective of differentiating themselves on caste basis. They clean their roads and ghat \ River bank. It is celebrated twice a year.

Chhath during end of Spring:  it is generally celebrated at the home ground or on roof top. water is filled either by making small ditch or putting in bucket. Water filled are is decorated as per the capabilities of individual.
Chhath during beginning of winter: celebrated after the crop is harvested. It is majority celebrated on the bank of river Ganga

3. Durga Puja: There are two temples dedicated to Devi Durga. during Durga Puja, statue is established in these two temple where people gather to prayer. It is also celebrated twice a year.

4. Kali Puja: There is one temple in the area, within the vicinity if 5 km radius. A large gathering of people could be seen during this festival.

5. Saraswati Puja and Vishwakarma Puja: Once this was celebrated in its full charm, but now it has been abandoned, i.e., there is no celebration.

6. School ground worship: once a year school ground is worshiped. it is mainly done by the students who succeeded in obtaining a job. Villagers come for walk and students come to sprint on this field on daily basis during morning and evening.
