= Kanwar Lake Bird Sanctuary =

Freshwater oxbow lake in Bihar, India

Kanwar Taal Bird Sanctuary
- Kanwar Taal
- IUCN category IV (habitat/species management area)
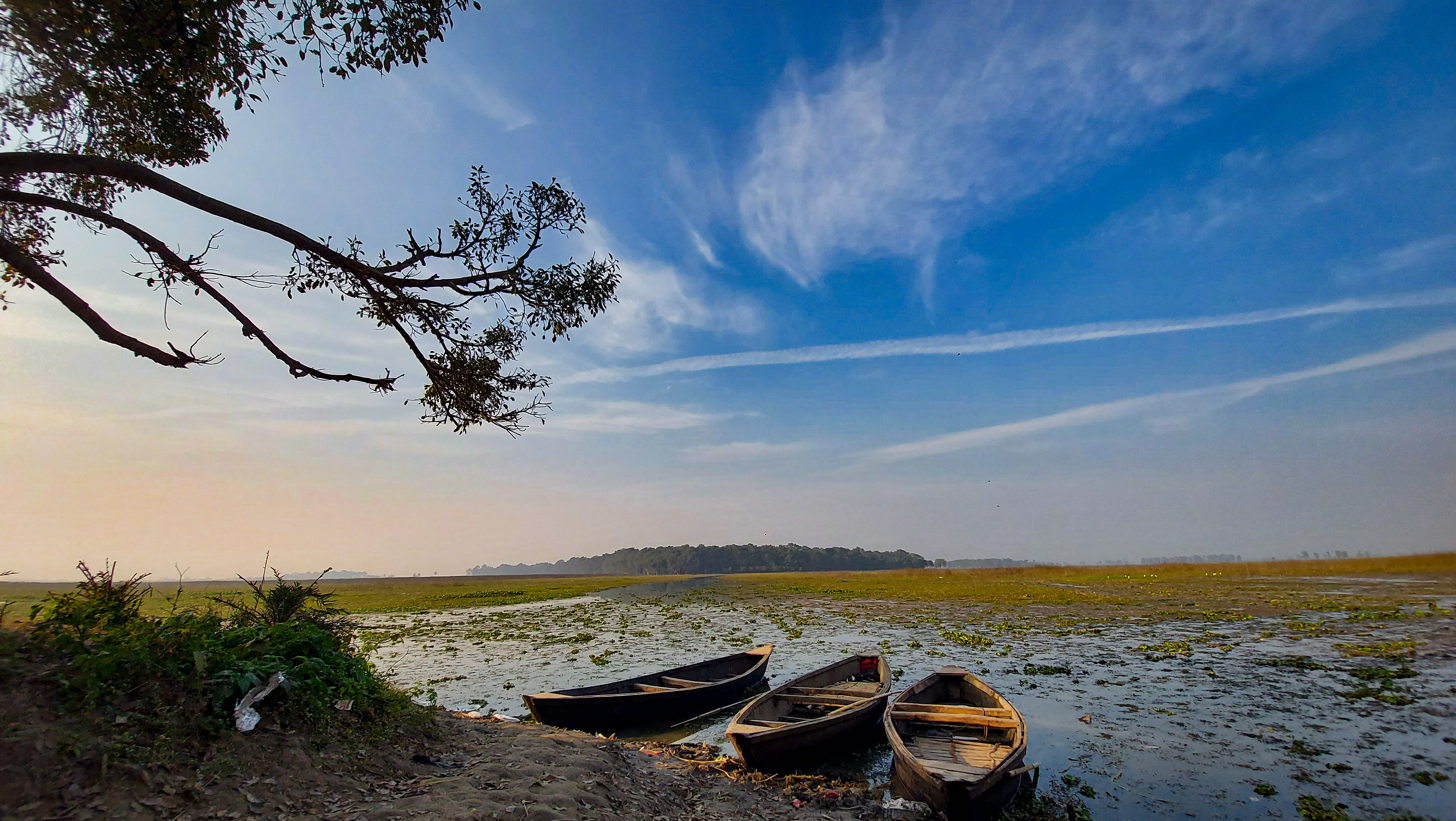

- Location within India
- Interactive map of Kanwar Taal Bird Sanctuary
- Location: Begusarai district, Bihar, India
- Nearest city: Begusarai
- Coordinates: 25°36′36″N 86°08′24″E
- Area: 67.5 km^{2} (26.1 sq mi)
- Elevation: 41 m (135 ft)
- Established: 1987
- Governing body: Ministry of Environment, Forest and Climate Change, Government of India

Ramsar Wetland
- Official name: Kabartal Wetland
- Designated: 21 July 2020
- Reference no.: 2436

The Kanwar Taal or Kabar Taal Lake or Kabartal Wetland located in Begusarai district of Bihar, India, Asia's largest freshwater oxbow lake. It is approximately six times the size of the Bharatpur Sanctuary. In November 2020, the Ministry of Environment, Forest and Climate Change (MoEFCC) declared it the first Ramsar site in Bihar. It is one of the 98 Ramsar sites in India now.

Kanwar jheel, as it is locally called, is located 22 km north-west of Begusarai Town in Manjhaul. It is a residual oxbow lake, formed due to meandering of Burhi Gandak river, a tributary of Ganga, in the geological past. It covers 2,620 hectares of the Indo-Gangetic plains in the northern Bihar State. The Site is one of 18 wetlands within an extensive floodplain complex; it floods during the monsoon season to a depth of 1.5 metres. This absorption of floodwaters is a vital service in Bihar State where 70% of the land is vulnerable to inundation. During the dry season, areas of marshland dry out and are used for agriculture. Significant biodiversity is present, with 165 plant species and 394 animal species recorded, including 221 bird species. The Wetland is an important stopover along the Central Asian Flyway, with 58 migratory waterbirds using it to rest and refuel. It is also a valuable site for fish biodiversity with over 50 species documented. Five critically endangered species inhabit the site, including three vultures – the red-headed vulture (Sarcogyps calvus), white-rumped vulture (Gyps bengalensis) and Indian vulture (Gyps indicus) – and two waterbirds, the sociable lapwing (Vanellus gregarius) and Baer’s pochard (Aythya baeri). Major threats to the Site include water management activities such as drainage, water abstraction, damming and canalization.

Ornithologist Salim Ali, mentioned about 60 migratory birds that come all the way from Central Asia in winter and recorded around 106 species of resident birds. Since 2020 the lake has been designated as a protected Ramsar site.

The nearest railway station is Begusarai Station; the nearest bus stop is Jaimanglagadh; and the nearest airport is Lok Nayak Jayaprakash Airport in Patna.

== Trees ==
Mangifera indica, Annona squamosa, Polyalthia longifolia, Borassus flabellifer, Cocos nucifera, Phoenix sylvestris, Haplophragma adenophyllum, Bombax ceiba, Ceiba pentandra, Cordia dichotoma, Ehretia laevis, Bauhinia variegata, Cassia fistula, Delonix regia, Peltophorum pterocarpum, Tamarindus indica, Trema oriental, Terminalia arjuna, Diospyros Montana, Croton roxburghii, Trevia nudiflora, Dalbergia sissoo, Leucaena leucocephala, Pongamia glabra, Phoebe lanceolata, Azadirachta indica, Melia azedarach, Swietenia macrophylla, Acacia catechu, Acacia nilotica, Albizia lebbeck, Pithecellobium dulce, Artocarpus heterophyllus, Artocarpus lacucha, Ficus benghalensis, Ficus hispida, Ficus racemosa, Ficus religiosa, Ficus virens, Streblus asper, Moringa oleifera, Eucalyptus tereticornis, Psidium guajava, Syzygium cumini, Nyctanthes arbor-tristis, Phyllanthus emblica, Bambusa bambos, Dendrocalamus strictus, Ziziphus mauritiana, Anthocephalus kadamba, Aegle marmelos, Citrus maxima, Madhuca indica, Tectona grandis

== Threats ==
- Excessive chemicals, like Furadan used to capture birds
- Killing of birds
- Villagers encroachment of lake area

== Birds in the region ==
=== Critically endangered ===
- Oriental white-backed vulture (Gyps bengalensis)
- Long-billed vulture (Gyps indicus)

=== Endangered ===
- Greater adjutant (Leptoptilos dubiu)

=== Vulnerable ===
- Greater spotted eagle (Aquila clanga)
- Lesser kestrel (Falco naumanni)
- Sarus crane (Grus antigone)

=== Near threatened ===
- Indian darter (Anhinga melanogaster)
- Painted stork (Mycteria leucocephala)
- Black-bellied tern (Sterna acuticauda)

=== Images ===
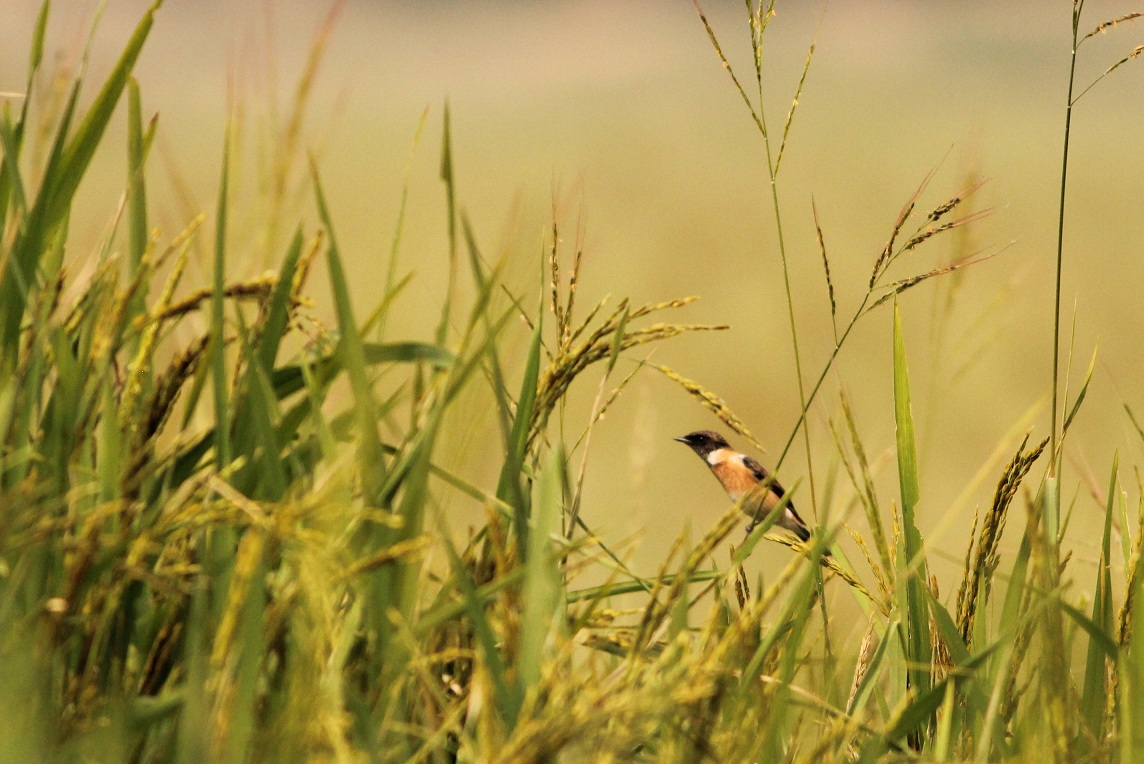
Siberian stonechat

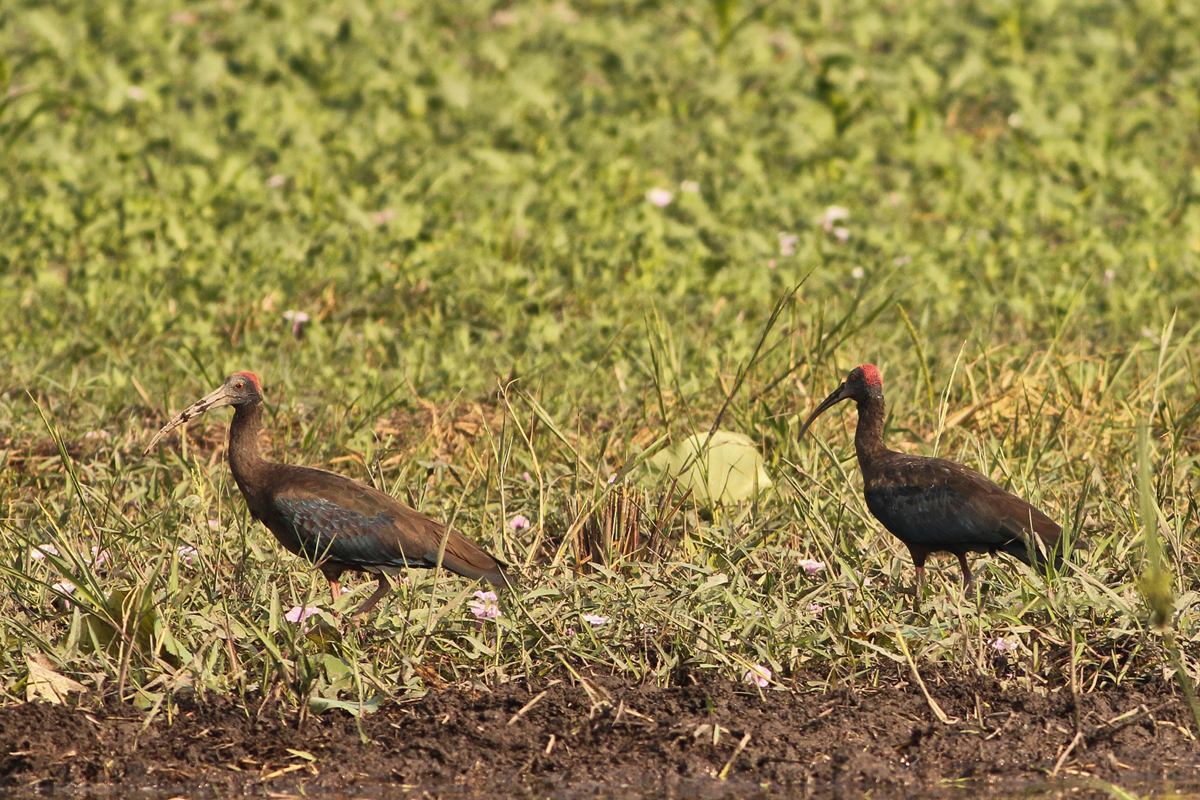
Red-naped ibis

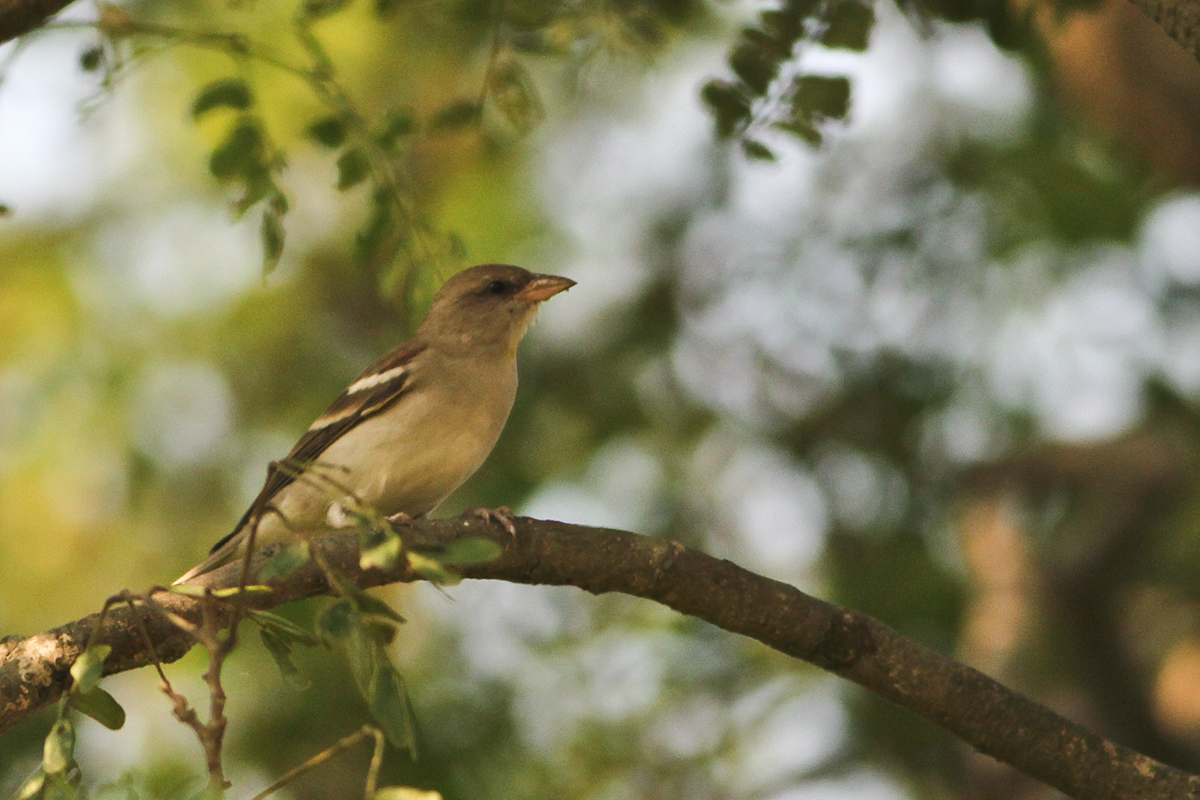
Yellow-throated sparrow

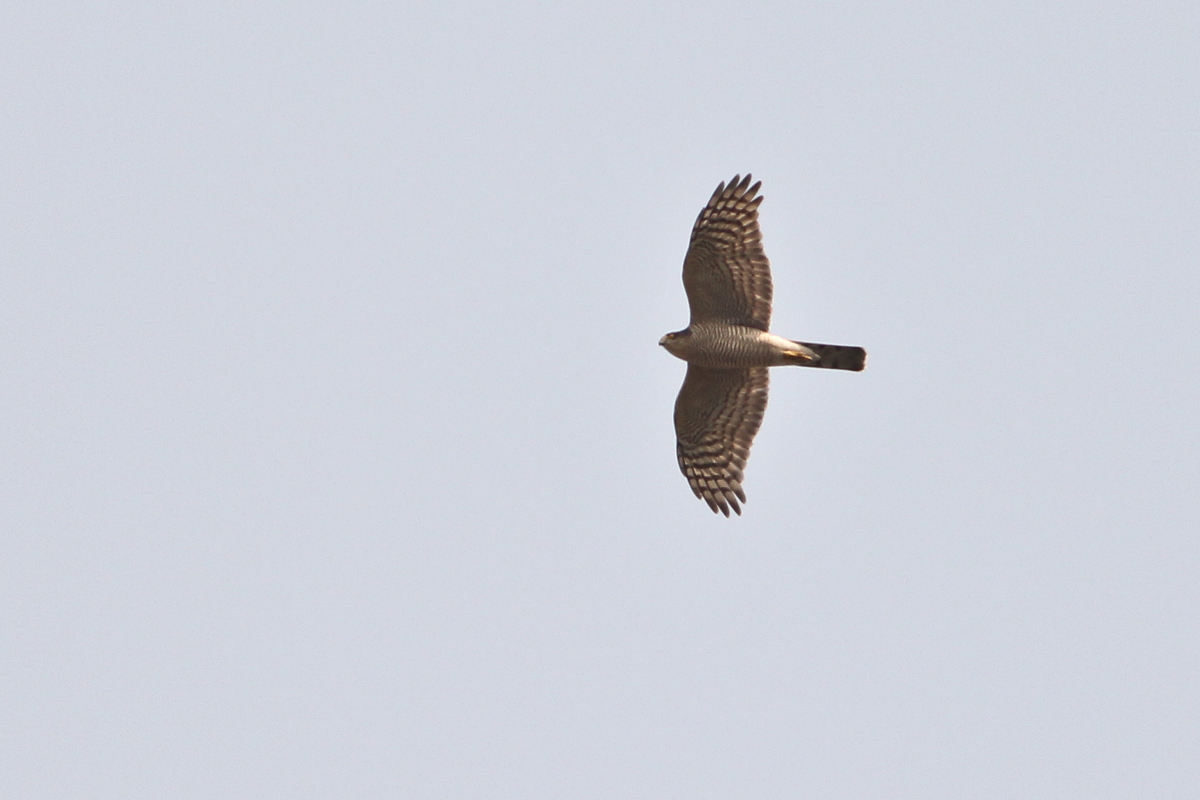
Eurasian sparrowhawk

== See also ==
- Bharatpur Bird Sanctuary
