= Nipania, Begusarai =

Nipania
- Residential Locality (Barauni Nagar Parishad)
- Location in Bihar, India Nipania (India)
- Coordinates: 25.4294°N 85.9675°E
- Country: India
- State: Bihar
- City: Barauni
- District: Begusarai

Area
  - Total: 4 km^{2} (1.5 sq mi)

Population
  - Total: 10,000
  - Density: 2,500/km^{2} (6,500/sq mi)

Languages
  - Official: Maithili, Hindi
- Time zone: UTC+5:30 (IST)
- ISO 3166 code: IN-BR

Nipania is a residential locality at Barauni Nagar Parishad in Begusarai district, Bihar, India. It is also home to a military camp. It is situated near Barauni Junction railway station.
