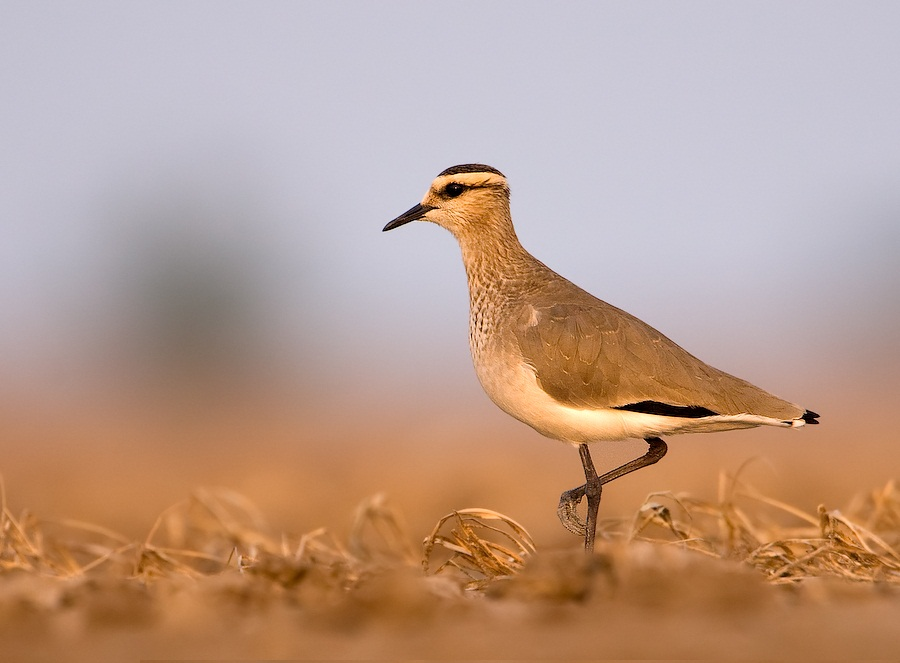
- At the Little Rann of Kutch, India

Conservation status
- Critically Endangered (IUCN 3.1)

Scientific classification
- Kingdom: Animalia
- Phylum: Chordata
- Class: Aves
- Order: Charadriiformes
- Family: Charadriidae
- Genus: Vanellus
- Species: V. gregarius

Binomial name
- Vanellus gregarius (Pallas, 1771); Volga, Russian Empire
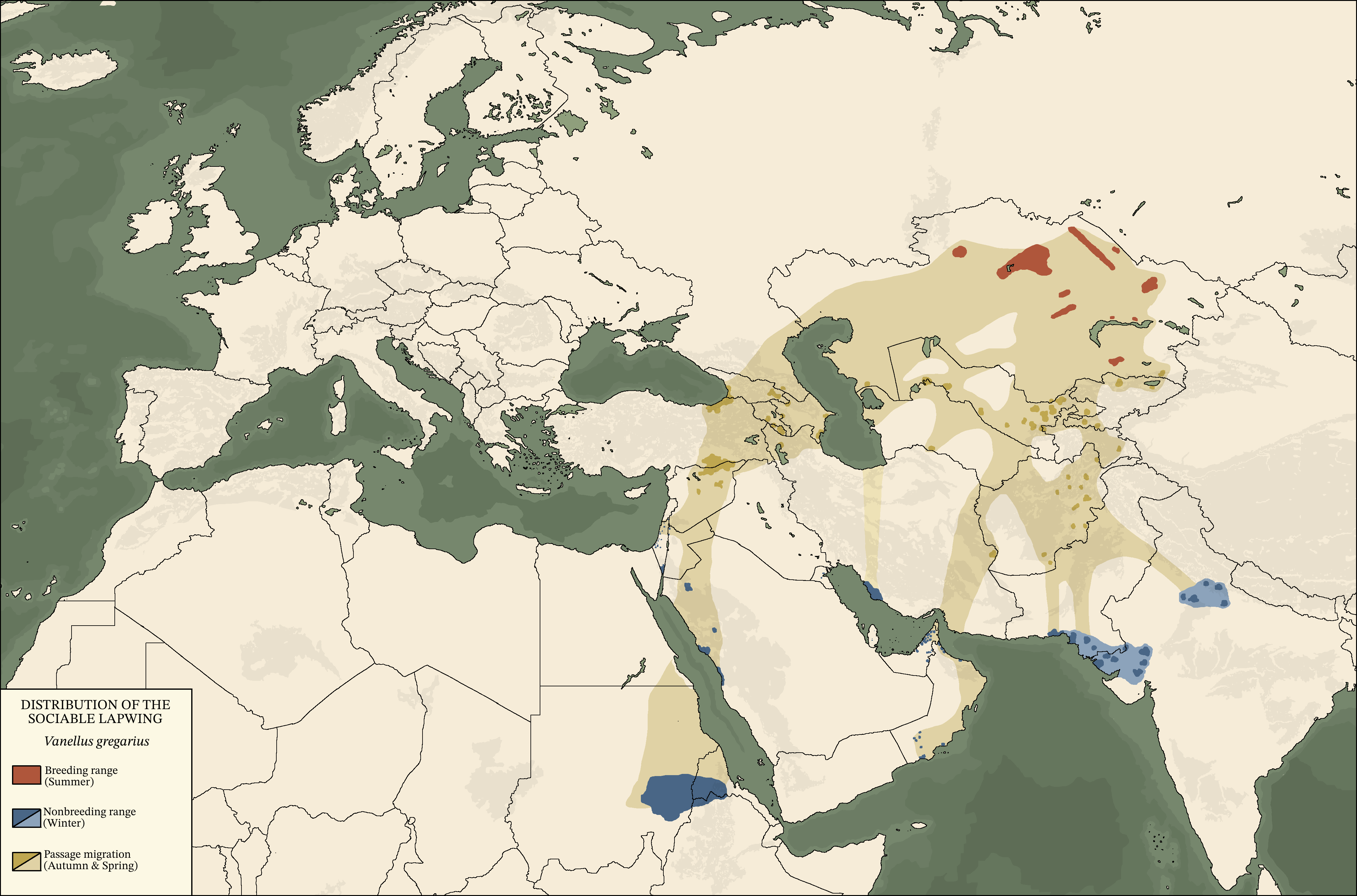
- Range of V. gregarius (Compiled by: Fahad)

Synonyms
- Chaetusia gregaria (unjustified emendation); Charadrius gregarius Pallas, 1771; Cheltusia gregaria (unjustified emendation); Chettusia gregaria (Pallas, 1771); Chetusia gregaria (unjustified emendation); Choetusia gregaria (unjustified emendation)

Audio

= Sociable lapwing =

Species of bird

The sociable lapwing (Vanellus gregarius), referred to as the sociable plover in the UK, is a wader in the plover family. It is a fully migratory bird, breeding in Kazakhstan and wintering in the Middle East, Indian subcontinent, and Sudan with a very small wintering population in Iberia. Historical literature referred to this bird as the black-bellied lapwing.

== Taxonomy ==
Along with other lapwings, it is placed in the genus Vanellus. The genus name is Medieval Latin for a lapwing and derives from vannus a winnowing fan. The specific gregarius is Latin for "sociable" from grex, gregis, "flock" referring to its tendency to be present alongside conspecifics and other closely related birds.

The sociable lapwing is one of many birds described by Pallas during his trip through the Russian landscape.

It is a monotypic species - no subspecies are recognised.

== Description ==
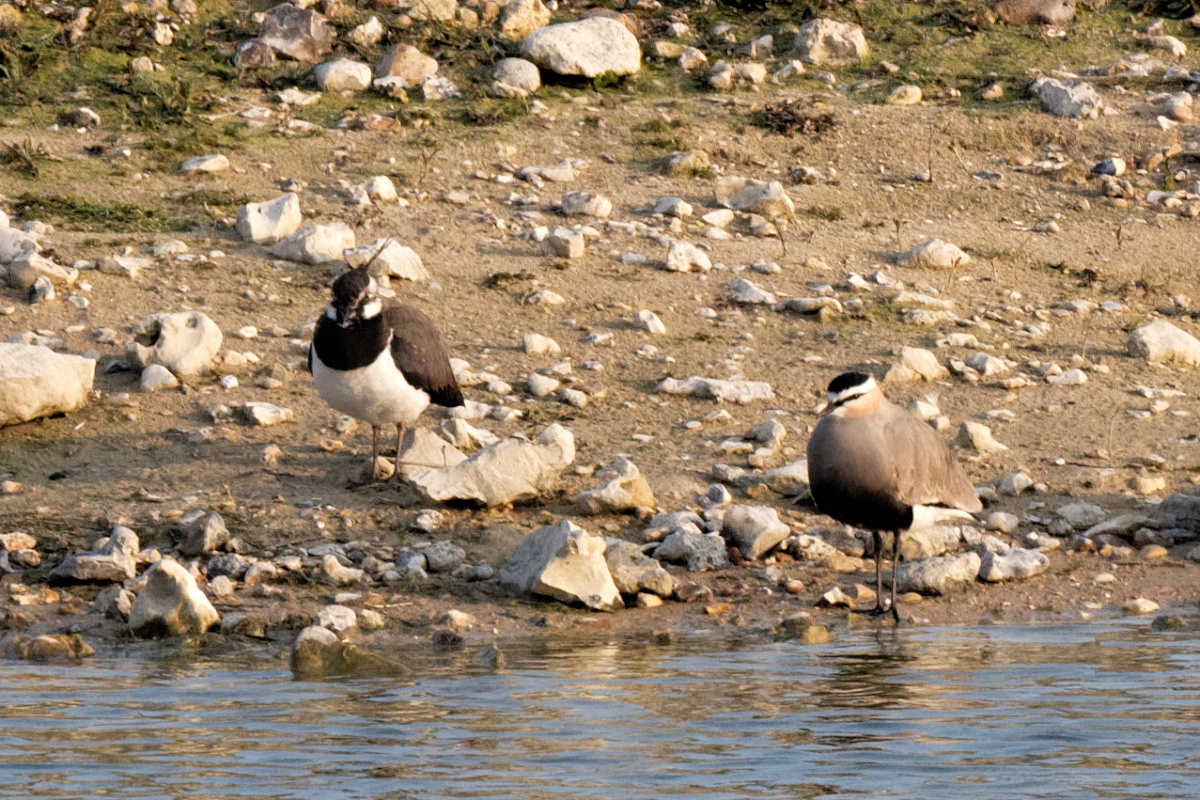
A male alongside a lapwing in Paris, France

This medium-sized lapwing has longish black legs and a short black bill. Non breeding individuals in winter have light brown wings with a striking head pattern. The sociable lapwing has a black crown and eyestripe, the latter being bordered above and below with white. The underside of the bird is white. Its long-ish black legs, white tail with a black terminal band and distinctive brown, white and grey wings make it almost unmistakable in flight.

The summer breeding plumage is much more vivid. The brown feathers become grey-ish and slightly glossy with the exception of the cheeks, which are ochre. The stripes across the eyes and the bird's crown are stronger in colour, and the lower breast of the bird takes on a black plumage which fades to rich chestnut-coloured feathers as they near the vent.

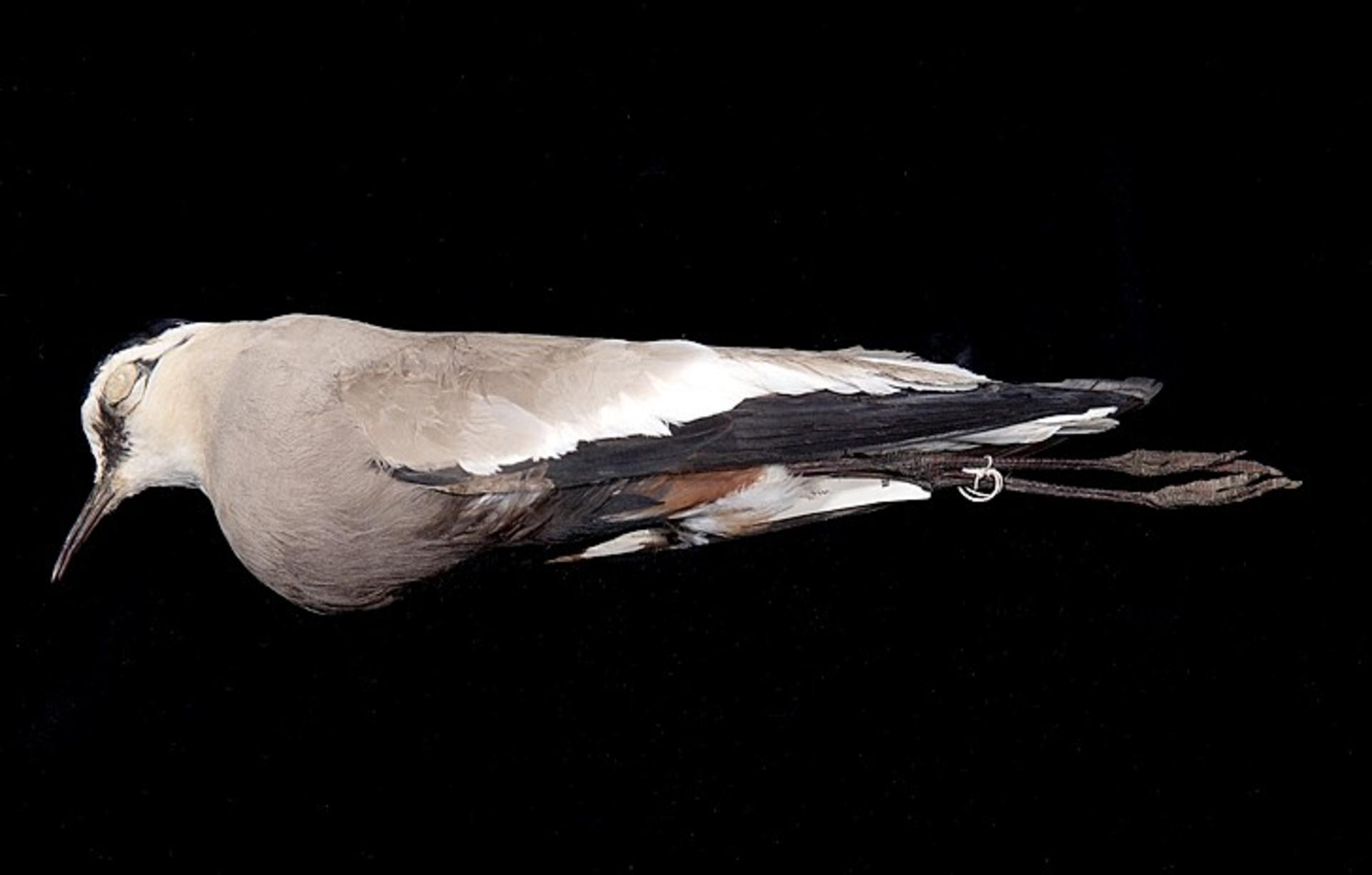
A skin specimen of a male sociable lapwing collected in the Russian Empire, 1913

Juveniles have a bordered back feathers giving them a "scaly" appearance and only traces of the head pattern.

This bird resembles the more abundant white-tailed lapwing, but has a striped crown and dark grey legs as opposed to the yellow legs and plain head of the white-tailed lapwing. It is between27–30 cm (11–12 in) in length. The call is a harsh kereck.

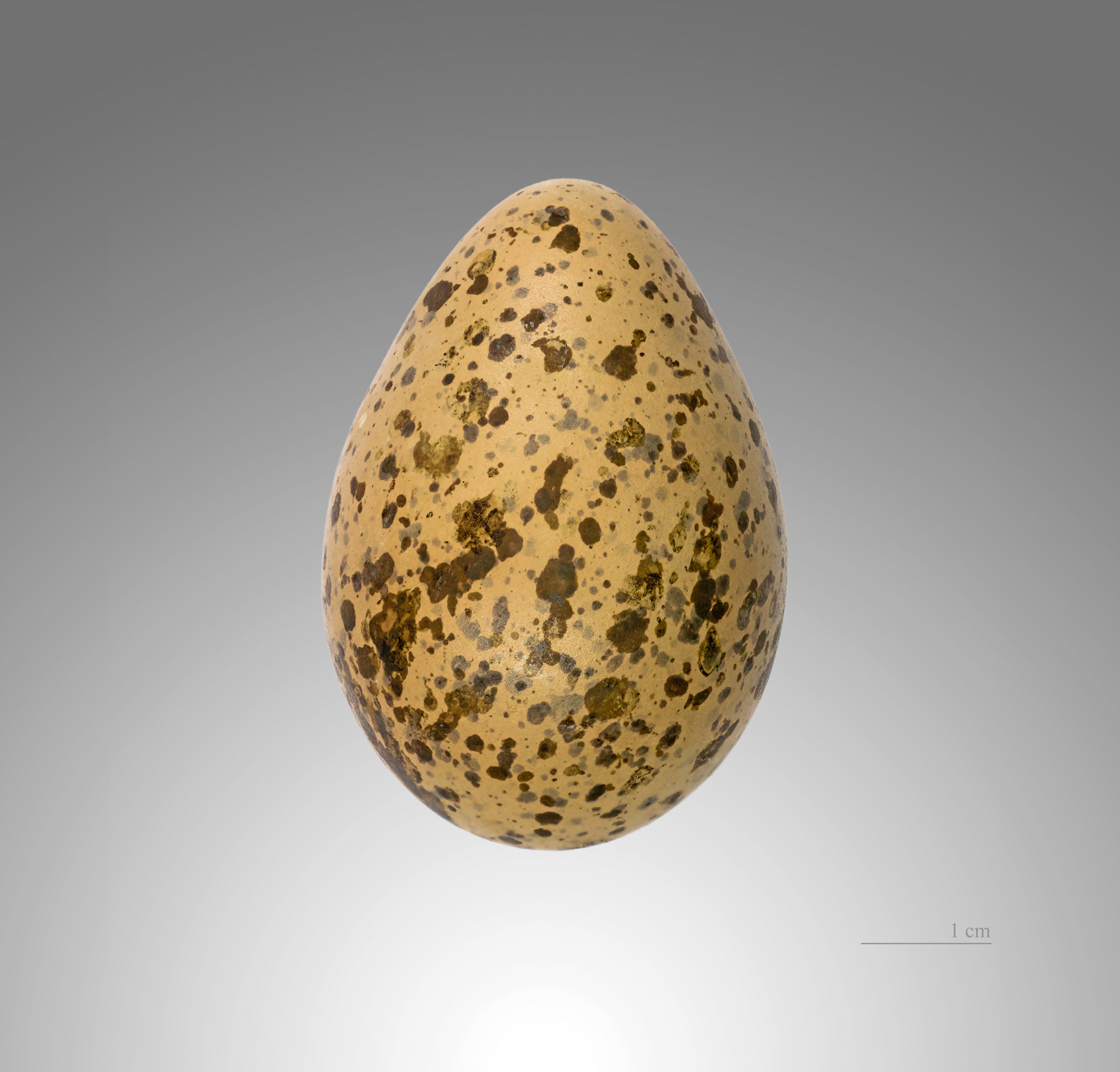
Egg - MHNT

== Distribution and habitat ==
Unlike other lapwings, which tend to gravitate towards wetter aquatic environments, the sociable lapwing prefers steppes, arid grasslands, and cultivated fields. It breeds in the steppes of Kazakhstan. Three to four eggs are laid in a ground nest. The sociable lapwing has historically followed two migration routes, one western and one eastern. On its western route, it passes over Central Asia and Turkey to winter in Israel, Palestine and Lebanon, a few regions in Saudi Arabia, as well as Eastern Africa. On its eastern route, it winters in coastal Iran, the United Arab Emirates, and India.

In the case of two countries, however, the case is different. Qatar and Kuwait, the sociable lapwing was recorded historically as a vagrant, with the first sightings in the 80s. As the nations industrialised, farms and parks were established throughout the countries. In particular, vagrants have visited the Rukaiya farm and Sulaibyia pivot fields in the early 2000s and have taken to repeatedly visiting or even wintering in the nations, giving rise to a third, central migration route.

Once occupying a large range in Europe, the sociable lapwing has been practically wiped out from the continent. The remnants of the former Ukrainian population migrate to the Iberian peninsula, where up to five individuals may spend the winter. On their way, individuals have been observed in nearly every European country and the French Empire, often found alongside the Northern lapwing on its migratory and vagrancy trips. It feeds in a similar way, picking insects and other small prey mainly from grassland or arable land.

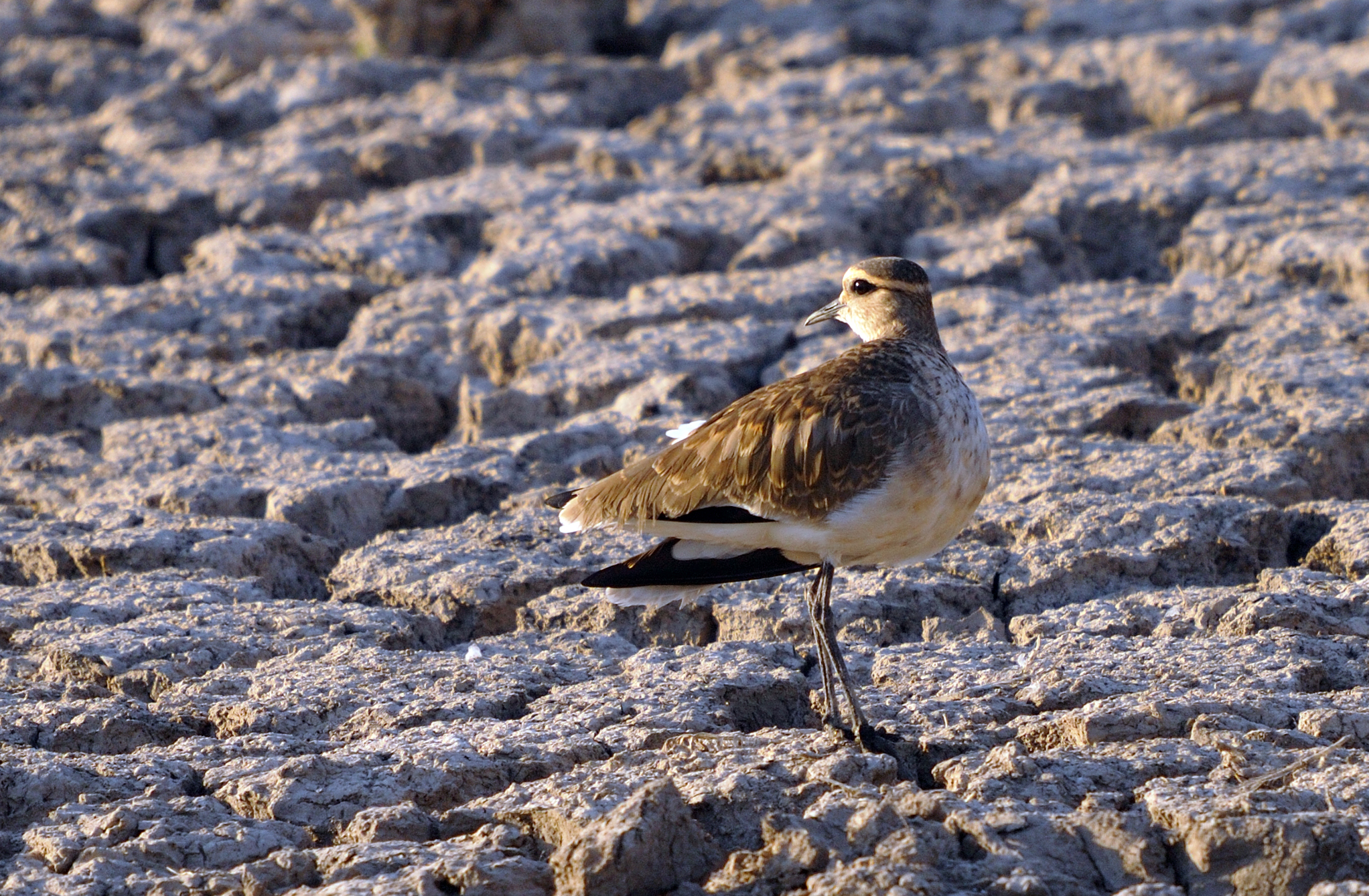

== Status ==
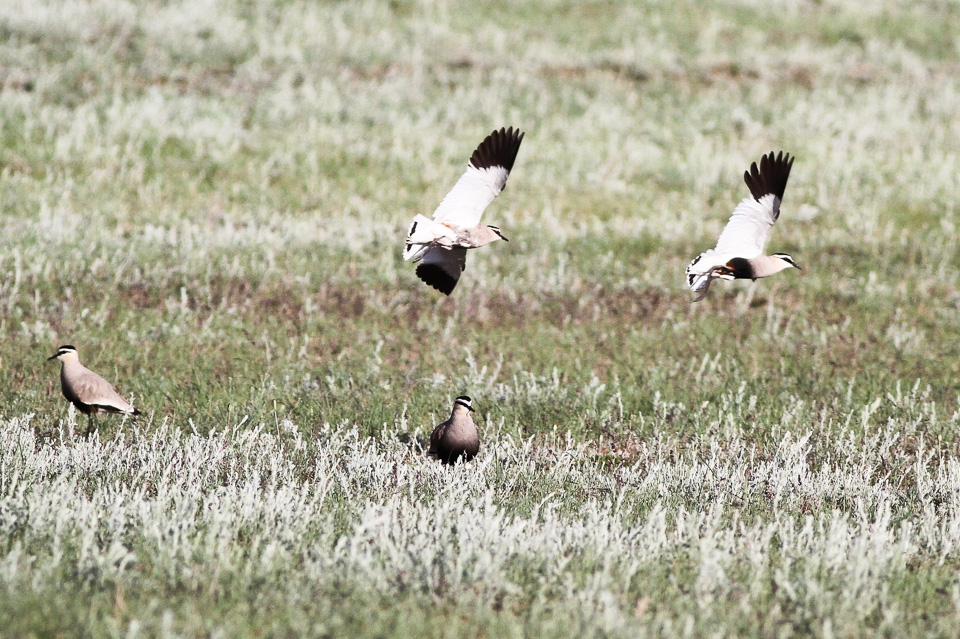
breeding individuals in Kazakhstan

The sociable lapwing's population had always been difficult to quantify. It was estimated that the population has always been in decline, and especially following a major crash towards the end of the 20th century, leaving the current population at only 20-25% of its historical count.

The estimated population count was enhanced following decades long studies and, in October 2007, a superflock of approximately 3,200 sociable lapwings were discovered in Turkey, according to Guven Eken, director of the Turkish Nature Association. Additionally, 1500 sociable lapwings were found overwintering in Syria. The population is currently estimated to sit at 17 thousand individuals, and there was a reported increase in nests each year leading up to 2007, however it is difficult to determine whether this was an increase or simply more nests being found as a result of intensified fieldwork. The range of the sociable lapwing has heavily contracted as it has once existed from Ukraine to China.

The fieldwork undergone that led to the discoveries of thousands of sociable lapwings had led to the population being much larger than once feared, however it was also discovered adults have low survival rates, and the population is projected to decline at a similar or accelerated rate. The reasons for the crash of the population are largely unknown, but hunting along migratory flyways has been attributed as a notable threat at the very least.
