= Burhi Gandak River =

River in India

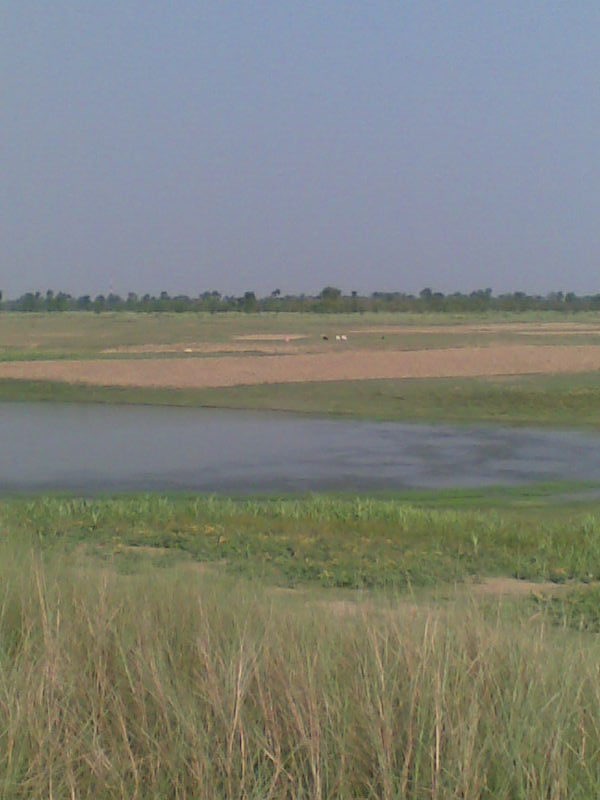

Location
- Country: India
- State: Bihar

Physical characteristics
- Source: Chautarwa Chaur
  - location: near Harpur, West Champaran district
- Mouth: Ganges
  - location: Khagaria
  - coordinates: 25°26′02″N 86°36′25″E
- Length: 320 km (200 mi)
- Basin size: 10,150 km^{2} (3,920 sq mi)
- Discharge
  - location: Between Gogri Khagaria and Bariarpur Munger

The Burhi Gandak River is a tributary of the Ganges. It is also known as the Sikrahna river. The Burhi ("Old") Gandak flows parallel to and east of the Gandak River in an old channel.

== Course ==
The Burhi Gandak originates from Chautarwa Chaur near Bisambharpur in the district of West Champaran in Bihar. It initially flows through the East Champaran district. After flowing for a distance of about 56 kilometres (35 mi), the river takes a southerly turn where two rivers - the Dubhara and the Tour – join it. Thereafter, the river flows in a south-easterly direction through the Muzaffarpur district for about 32 kilometres (20 mi). In this portion, the river spills over its banks and a number of spill channels take off and rejoin it later.

The Burhi Gandak runs a zig-zag course through the districts of Samastipur and Begusarai before covering a short distance in Khagaria district, running by the side of the town of Khagaria, and flows into the Ganges near Gogri and near Bhelwa-ghat of Bariyarpur block in Munger. It forms the western boundary of the Khagaria town and a protection embankment built along the eastern side of this river, protects Khagaria town from the floods of Burhi Gandak.

The total length of the river is 320 kilometres (200 mi). The drainage area of the river is 10,150 square kilometres (3,920 sq mi).

=== Tributaries ===
The main tributaries of the Burhi Gandak are - Masan, Balor, Pandai, Sikta, Tilawe, Tiur, Dhanauti, Kohra, Anjankote, Danda and lauriya.
