= Politics of India =

- National Emblem of India
- Polity type: Federal parliamentary republic
- Constitution: Constitution of India

Legislative branch
- Name: Parliament
- Type: Bicameral
- Meeting place: Sansad Bhavan
- Upper house
- Name: Rajya Sabha
- Presiding officer: Vice President C. P. Radhakrishnan, Chairman of the Rajya Sabha
- Appointer: Electoral College
- Lower house
- Name: Lok Sabha
- Presiding officer: Om Birla, Speaker of the Lok Sabha

Executive branch
- Head of state
- Title: President
- Currently: Draupadi Murmu
- Appointer: Electoral College
- Head of government
- Title: Prime Minister
- Currently: Narendra Modi
- Appointer: President
- Cabinet
- Name: Union Council of Ministers
- Current cabinet: Third Modi ministry
- Leader: Prime Minister
- Appointer: President
- Ministries: 52

Judicial branch
- Name: Judiciary
- Supreme Court
- Chief judge: Suryakant Sharma

The politics and government in the Republic of India work in adherence to the Constitution of India, which was adopted on November 26, 1949, by the Constituent Assembly of India, and took effect on January 26, 1950. India is a parliamentary secular democratic republic, described as a “sovereign, socialist, secular democratic republic” in its constitution.

Part I of the Constitution of India describes India as a "Union of States," and is used interchangeably to refer to the "union government" or Government of India to denote the federal authority. India is divided among 28 states and 8 union territories for a total of 36 subnational entities. So, its governance of those entities is described in the constitution as a quasi-federal system that incorporates elements from both federal and unitary forms of government. The states of India are self-governing administrative divisions each having a state government, whereas the union territories are governed directly by the union government, and are administered by a lieutenant governor or administrator appointed by the president of India. India follows a dual federalist system, however the Constitution defines the organizational powers and limitations of both states and union territories of India. Government operations are led by the president of India who, as the ceremonial head of state, holds formal executive power. So, In accordance to parliamentary elections, the president appoints the prime minister as the head of government, along with prospective ministers who are members of parliament.

The legal power to manage affairs in each state is shared or divided between the particular state government and the national union government. The union territories are directly governed by the union government with no state level government existing in these jurisdictions. There is a provision for a bicameral legislature consisting of an upper house, the Rajya Sabha (Council of States), which represents the states of the Indian federation, and a lower house, the Lok Sabha (House of the People), which represents the people of India as a whole. Vidhan Sabha (state legislative assemblies) represents the people residing in one of the 28 states.

The Constitution provides for an independent judiciary, which is headed by the Supreme Court of India. The court's mandate is to protect the Constitution, to settle disputes between the central government and the states, to settle inter-state disputes, to nullify any central or state laws that go against the Constitution and to protect the fundamental rights of citizens, issuing writs for their enforcement in cases of violation.

There are 543 members in the Lok Sabha, who are elected using plurality voting (first past the post) system from 543 Single-member district. There are 245 members in the Rajya Sabha, out of which 233 are elected through indirect elections by single transferable vote by the members of the state legislative assemblies; 12 other members are elected/nominated by decree from the president of India. Union and state governments are formed through elections held every five years (unless otherwise specified), by parties that secure a majority of members in their respective lower houses.

India had its first general election in 1951, which was won by the Indian National Congress, a political party that went on to dominate subsequent elections until 1977, when a non-Congress government was formed for the first time in independent India. The 1990s saw the end of single-party domination and the rise of coalition governments. The latest 18th Lok Sabha elections was conducted in seven phases from 19 April 2024 to 1 June 2024 by the Election commission of India. The results bought in the NDA (National Democratic Alliance) to form in the next government

In recent decades, Indian politics has become a dynastic affair. Possible reasons for this could be the party stability, absence of party organisations, independent civil society associations that mobilise support for the parties and centralised financing of elections. According to the V-Dem Democracy indices India in 2023 was the 19th most electoral democratic country in Asia.

== Union government ==
The Government of India is modelled after the Westminster system. The Union government (also called as the Central government) is mainly composed of the executive, the legislature, and the judiciary, and powers are vested by the constitution in the prime minister, parliament, and the supreme court, respectively. The president of India is the head of state and the commander-in-chief of the Indian Armed Forces, while the elected prime minister acts as the head of the executive and is responsible for running the Union government. The parliament is bicameral in nature, with the Rajya Sabha being the upper house, and the Lok Sabha the lower house. The judiciary systematically contains an apex supreme court, 25 high courts, and 688 district courts, all inferior to the supreme court.

The basic civil and criminal laws governing the citizens of India are set down in major parliamentary legislation, such as the civil procedure code, the penal code, and the criminal procedure code. Similar to the Union government, individual state governments each consist of executive, legislative and judiciary branches. The legal system as applicable to the Union and individual state governments is based on the English common and Statutory law. The term New Delhi is commonly used as a metonym for the Union government, as the seat of the central government is in New Delhi.

=== Rajya Sabha ===
The Rajya Sabha, constitutionally the Council of States, is the upper house of the bicameral Parliament of India. It has a maximum membership of 250, of which 238 are elected by the legislatures of the states and union territories using single transferable votes through open ballots, while the president can appoint 12 members for their contributions to art, literature, science, and social service. The total allowed capacity is 250 (238 elected, 12 appointed) according to article 80 of the Indian Constitution. The current potential seating capacity of the Rajya Sabha is 245 (233 elected, 12 appointed).

Members sit for staggered terms lasting six years, with about a third of the 238 designates up for election every two years, in even-numbered years. Unlike the Lok Sabha, the Rajya Sabha is a continuing chamber and hence not subject to dissolution. However, the Rajya Sabha, like the Lok Sabha, can be prorogued by the president.

The Rajya Sabha has equal footing in legislation with the Lok Sabha, except in the area of supply, where the latter has overriding powers. In the case of conflicting legislation, a joint sitting of the two houses can be held, where the Lok Sabha would hold a greater influence because of its larger membership. The vice president of India is the ex-officio chairperson of the Rajya Sabha, who presides over its sessions. The deputy chairperson, who is elected from amongst the house's members, takes care of the day-to-day matters of the house in the absence of the chairperson.

=== Lok Sabha ===
The Lok Sabha, constitutionally the House of the People, is the lower house of India's bicameral Parliament. Members of the Lok Sabha are elected by an adult universal suffrage and a first-past-the-post system to represent their respective constituencies, and they hold their seats for five years or until the body is dissolved by the President on the advice of the council of ministers. The house meets in the Lok Sabha Chambers of the Parliament House, New Delhi.

The maximum membership of the House allotted by the Constitution of India is 552 (initially 500 in 1950) Currently, the house has 543 seats which are filed by the election of up to 543 elected members. The new parliament has a seating capacity of 888 for Lok Sabha. A total of 131 seats (24.03%) are reserved for representatives of Scheduled Castes (84) and Scheduled Tribes (47). The quorum for the House is 10% of the total membership.

The Lok Sabha, unless sooner dissolved, continues to operate for five years from the date appointed for its first meeting. However, while a proclamation of emergency is in operation, this period may be extended by Parliament by law or decree.

Members of Lok Sabha (House of the People) or the lower house of India's Parliament are elected by being voted upon by all adult citizens of India, who crossed 18 years from a set of candidates who stand in their respective constituencies. Every adult citizen of India can vote only in their constituency.

==== Office of the Prime Minister ====
The Prime Minister of India is the head of government of the Republic of India. Executive authority is vested in the prime minister and his chosen Council of Ministers, despite the president of India being the nominal head of the executive. The prime minister has to be a member of one of the houses of bicameral Parliament of India, alongside heading the respective house. The prime minister and their cabinet are at all times responsible to the Lok Sabha.

The prime minister is appointed by the president of India; however, the prime minister has to enjoy the confidence of the majority of Lok Sabha members, who are directly elected every five years, lest the prime minister shall resign. The prime minister can be a member of the Rajya Sabha or of the Lok Sabha, the upper house of the parliament. The prime minister controls the selection and dismissal of members of the Union Council of Ministers; and allocation of posts to members within the government.

==== Office of the Council of Ministers ====
The Union Council of Ministers is the principal executive organ of the Government of India, which functions as the senior decision-making body of the executive branch. It is chaired by the prime minister and consists of the heads of each of the executive government ministries.

A smaller executive body called the Union Cabinet is the supreme decision-making body in India; it is a subset of the Union Council of Ministers who hold important portfolios and ministries of the government.

Pursuant to Article 75, a minister who works at the pleasure of the President, is appointed by the President on the advice of the Prime Minister. There are five categories of the council of ministers as given below, in descending order of rank:

- Prime Minister: Leader of the Union Council of Ministers.
- Deputy Prime Minister (if any): Presides as prime minister in his absence or as the senior most cabinet minister.
- Cabinet Minister: A member of the Union cabinet; leads a ministry.
- Minister of State (Independent charge): Junior minister not reporting to a Cabinet Minister.
- Minister of State (MoS): Deputy Minister reporting to a Cabinet Minister, usually tasked with a specific responsibility in that ministry.

=== President & Vice-President of India ===
==== Office of the President of India ====
The President of India is the head of state of the Republic of India. The president is the nominal head of the executive, the first citizen of the country, as well as the supreme commander of the Indian Armed Forces.

The new president is chosen by an electoral college consisting of the elected members of both houses of parliament (MPs), the elected members of the State Legislative Assemblies (Vidhan Sabha) of all States and the elected members of the legislative assemblies (MLAs) of union territories with legislatures, i.e., National Capital Territory (NCT) of Delhi, Jammu and Kashmir and Puducherry.

The election process of the president is a more extensive process than of the prime minister who is also elected indirectly (elected by the members of the majority party (or union) in the Lok Sabha). Whereas President being the constitutional head with duties to protect, defend and preserve the constitution and rule of law in a constitutional democracy with constitutional supremacy, is elected in an extensive manner by the members of Rajya Sabha, Lok Sabha and state legislative assemblies in a secret ballot procedure.

==== Office of the Vice-President of India ====
The Vice President of India is the deputy to the head of state of the Republic of India, i.e. the president of India. The office of vice president is the second-highest constitutional office after the president and ranks second in the order of precedence and first in the line of succession to the presidency. The vice president is also the ex officio chairperson of the Rajya Sabha.

Article 66 of the Constitution of India states the manner of election of the vice president. The vice president is elected indirectly by members of an electoral college consisting of the members of both Houses of Parliament and not the members of state legislative assembly by the system of proportional representation using single transferable votes and the voting is conducted by Election Commission of India via secret ballot. The vice president also acts as the chancellor of the Panjab University and Delhi University.

== State governments ==
State governments in India are the governments ruling over 28 states and 8 union territories of India and the head of the Council of Ministers in a state is the Chief Minister. Each state has a legislative assembly. A state legislature that has one house – the state legislative assembly (Vidhan Sabha) – is a unicameral legislature. A state legislature that has two houses – state legislative council (Vidhan Parishad) and the state legislative assembly – is a bicameral legislature. The Vidhan Parishad is the upper house and corresponds to the Rajya Sabha of the Parliament of India while the Vidhan Sabha is the lower house and corresponds to the Lok Sabha .

The judicial branch of the state consists of the High Court at the top, followed by District and Subordinate Courts, along with various special courts and tribunals established for specific purposes.

=== Executive branch of the State Government ===
The executive branch of a state government comprises the Governor and the Council of Ministers, headed by the Chief Minister. The Governor, appointed by the President of India, serves as the constitutional head, while the Chief Minister is the executive head of the government. Like the Union Government, the state government follows a similar structure — the Governor corresponds to the President, the Chief Minister to the Prime Minister, and the State Council of Ministers to the Union Council of Ministers.
The Council of Ministers, headed by the Chief Minister, exercises the executive powers of the state and includes Cabinet Ministers and Ministers of State, appointed by the Governor on the Chief Minister's advice. The state government functions through various ministries and departments, each headed politically by a Minister. The bureaucracy in the state is a permanent executive responsible for implementing government policies and decisions. The Chief Secretary, a senior IAS officer, is the administrative head of the government, and each department is headed administratively by a Secretary to the Government.

=== State legislative council ===
Vidhan Parishad, also called as the state legislative council, is the upper house in those states of India that have a bicameral state legislature; the lower house being the State Legislative Assembly. Its establishment is defined in Article 169 of the Constitution of India.

Only 6 out of 28 states have a legislative council. These are Andhra Pradesh, Karnataka, Telangana, Maharashtra, Bihar, and Uttar Pradesh. No union territory has a legislative council.

The size of the state legislative councils cannot be more than one third of the membership of the state legislative assembly. However, its size cannot be less than 40 members. These members elect the chairperson and deputy chairperson of the state legislative council.

=== State legislative assembly ===
Vidhan Sabha, also known as state legislative assembly, is a legislative body in each of the states and certain union territories of India. In 22 states and 3 union territories, there is a unicameral legislature which is the sole legislative body. Vidhan Sabha is present in all the states and 3 union territories.

Each Member of the Legislative Assembly (MLA) is directly elected to serve 5-year terms by single-member constituencies. The Constitution of India states that a state legislative assembly must have no less than 60 and no more than 500 members however an exception may be granted via an Act of Parliament as is the case in the states of Goa, Sikkim, Mizoram and the union territory of Puducherry which have fewer than 60 members.

A state legislative assembly may be dissolved in a state of emergency, by the Governor on request of the Chief Minister, or if a motion of no confidence is passed against the ruling majority party or coalition.

== Local governments ==
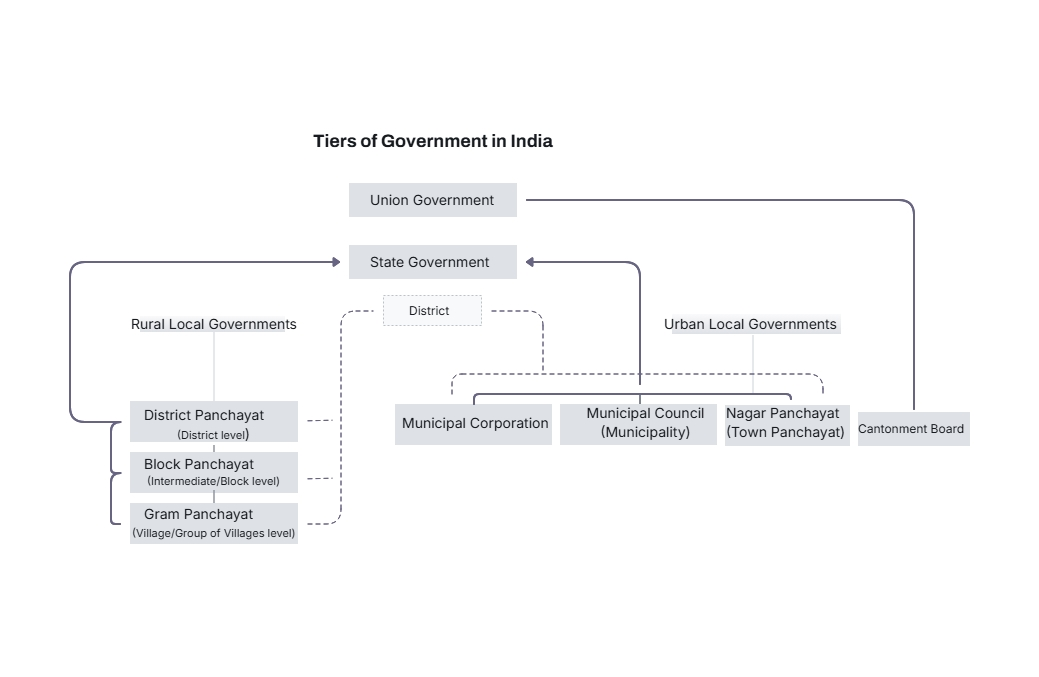
Tiers of Government in India

Local government in India is governmental jurisdiction below the level of the state. Local self-government means that residents in towns, villages and rural settlements are the people who elect local councils and their heads authorising them to solve the important issues. The 73rd and 74th constitutional amendments give recognition and protection to local governments and in addition each state has its own local government legislation.

Since 1992, local government in India takes place in two very distinct forms. Urban localities, covered in the 74th amendment to the Constitution, have Municipality but derive their powers from the individual state governments, while the powers of rural localities have been formalized under the panchayati raj system, under the 73rd amendment to the Constitution.

=== Urban local governing bodies ===
The following 3 types of democratically elected urban local bodies are called municipalities. These are classified based on the size of the population, density, revenue, non-agricultural employment, economic importance of the urban settlement.

- Municipal Corporation, also called the "Nagar Nigam" or "City Corporation", of cities with more than 1 million population.
- Municipal Council, also called the "Nagar Palika" or "Nagar Palika Parishad", of cities with more than 25,000 and less than 1 million population.
- Town Panchayat, also called the "Town Council" or "Nagar Panchayat" or "Town Panchayat" or "Notified Area Council" or "Notified Area Committee" depending on the state within which they lie, these are in the town with more than 10,000 and less than 25,000 population.

=== Rural local governing bodies ===
The Constitutional (73rd Amendment) Act, 1992 aims to provide a three-tier system of Panchayati Raj for all States having a population of over 2 million, to hold Panchayat elections regularly every five years, to provide reservation of seats for Scheduled Castes, Scheduled Tribes and Women, to appoint State Finance Commission to make recommendations as regards the financial powers of the Panchayats and to constitute District Planning Committee to prepare a draft development plan for the district. The following 3 hierarchies of PRI panchayats exist in states or Union Territories with more than two million inhabitants:

- Gram Panchayats at village level
- Panchayat Samiti or Mandal Parishad or Block Panchayat or Taluk Panchayat at Community Development Block or Mandal or Taluk level and
- Zila Parishad/District Panchayat at district level.

== Elections in India ==
Elections in the Republic of India include elections for

- President of India,
- Vice President of India,
- Members of the Parliament in Rajya Sabha (Upper house) and Lok Sabha (Lower house),
- Members of State Legislative Councils,
- Members of State Legislative Assemblies (includes legislative assemblies of three union territories - Jammu and Kashmir, National Capital Territory of Delhi and Puducherry)
- Members of local governance bodies (Municipal bodies and Panchayats),
- By-election is held when a seat-holder of a particular constituent dies, resigns, or is disqualified.

=== Election Commission of India ===
The Election Commission of India (ECI) is a constitutional body established by the Constitution of India empowered to conduct free and fair elections in India. The Election commission is headed by a Chief Election Commissioner and consists of two other Election Commissioners.

At the states and union territories, the Election Commission is assisted by the Chief Electoral Officer of the state or union territory (CEO), who leads the election machinery in the states and union territories. At the district and constituency levels, the District Magistrates/District Collectors (in their capacity as District Election Officers), Electoral Registration Officers and Returning Officers perform election work.

The Election Commission operates under the powers granted by Article 324 of the Constitution and subsequently enacted Representation of the People Act. The election commission decides the dates for the filing of nominations, voting, counting and announcement of results.

A law for the registration process for political parties was enacted in 1989. The registration ensures that the political parties are recognized as national, state and regional parties. The election commission has the right to allot symbols to the political parties depending on the status. The same symbol cannot be allocated to two political parties even if they do not contest in the region.

The commission prepares electoral rolls and updates the voter list. To prevent electoral fraud, Electors Photo Identity Cards (EPIC) were introduced in 1993. However certain legal documents such as ration cards have been allowed for voting in certain situations.

=== State Election Commissions (SECs) ===
The state election commissions are responsible for conducting local body elections in the respective states.

The State Election Commission (SEC) is an independent constitutional authority responsible for conducting free and fair elections to Local self-government institutions, such as panchayats and municipalities, within each state. Established under Article 243K and Article 243ZA of the Constitution, it oversees the preparation of electoral rolls, ensures adherence to the Model Code of Conduct, and supervises the entire election process at the state level. The Commission is headed by a State Election Commissioner, who is appointed by the Governor.

== Political parties, political families and alliances ==
=== Political parties in India ===
When compared to other democracies, India has had a large number of political parties during its history under democratic governance. It has been estimated that over 200 parties were formed after India became independent in 1947. As per latest publications dated 23 March 2024 from Election Commission of India, and subsequent notifications, there are 6 national parties, 57 state parties, and 2,764 registered unrecognized parties. All registered parties contesting elections need to choose a symbol from a list of available symbols offered by the EC.

==== Types of political parties ====
Every political party in India, whether a national or regional/state party, must have a symbol and must be registered with the Election Commission of India. Symbols are used in the Indian political system to identify political parties in part so that illiterate people can vote by recognizing the party symbols.

In the current amendment to the Symbols Order, the commission has asserted the following five principles:

1. A party, national or state, must have a legislative presence.
2. A national party's legislative presence must be in the Lok Sabha. A state party's legislative presence must be in the State Assembly.
3. A party can set up a candidate only from amongst its own members.
4. A party that loses its recognition shall not lose its symbol immediately but shall be allowed to use that symbol for some time to try and retrieve its status. However, the grant of such facility to the party will not mean the extension of other facilities to it, as are available to recognized parties, such as free time on Doordarshan or AIR, free supply of copies of electoral rolls, etc.
5. Recognition should be given to a party only on the basis of its own performance in elections and not because it is a splinter group of some other recognized party.

===== National political party =====
A political party shall be eligible to be recognized as a national party if:

1. it secures at least six percent (6%) of the valid votes polled in any four or more states, at a general election to the Lok Sabha or, to the State Legislative Assembly; and .
2. in addition, it wins at least four seats in the House of the People from any State or States.
3. or it wins at least two percent (2%) seats in the House of the People (i.e. 11 seats in the existing House having 543 members), and these members are elected from at least three different states.

Six national political parties are - Bharatiya Janata Party (BJP), Indian National Congress (INC), Bahujan Samaj Party (BSP), Communist Party of India (Marxist) (CPI-M), Aam Aadmi Party (AAP) and National People's Party (NPP).

===== State political party =====
A political party shall be entitled to be recognized as a state party, if:

1. it secures at least six percent (6%) of the valid votes polled in the state at a general election, either to the Lok Sabha or to the Legislative Assembly of the State concerned; and
2. in addition, it wins at least two seats in the Legislative Assembly of the state concerned.
3. or it wins at least three percent (3%) of the total number of seats in the Legislative Assembly of the state, or at least three seats in the Assembly, whichever is more.

===== Registered unrecognized political party (RUPP) =====
Registered unrecognized political parties are those parties which are either newly registered or which have not secured enough percentage of votes in the assembly or general elections to become a state party or those which have never contested elections since being registered. Registered but unrecognized political parties don't enjoy all the benefits extended to the recognized parties.

===== Party proliferation =====
Although a strict anti-defection law had been passed in 1984, there has been a continued tendency amongst politicians to float their own parties rather than join a broad based party such as the Congress or the BJP. Between the 1984 and 1989 elections, the number of parties contesting elections increased from 33 to 113. In the decades since, this fragmentation has continued.

=== Political families ===
Since the 1980s, Indian politics has become dynastic, possibly due to the absence of a party organization, independent civil society associations that mobilize support for the party, and centralized financing of elections. One example of dynastic politics has been the Nehru–Gandhi family which produced three Indian prime ministers: Jawaharlal Nehru, Indira Gandhi, Rajiv Gandhi. Family members have also led the Congress party for most of the period since 1978 when Indira Gandhi floated the then Congress(I) faction of the party. The ruling Bharatiya Janata Party also features several senior leaders who are dynasts. Dynastic politics is prevalent also in a number of political parties with regional presence such as All India Majlis-e-Ittehadul Muslimeen (AIMIM), Trinamool Congress (TMC), Bharat Rashtra Samithi (BRS), Shiv Sena (Uddhav Balasaheb Thackeray) (SHS (UBT)), Nationalist Congress Party - Sharadchandra Pawar (NCP (SP)), Dravida Munnetra Kazhagam (DMK), Indian National Lok Dal (INLD), Jammu & Kashmir National Conference (JKNC), Jammu and Kashmir People's Democratic Party (JKPDP), Janata Dal (Secular) (JD(S)), Jharkhand Mukti Morcha (JMM), National People's Party (NPP), Nationalist Congress Party (NCP), Pattali Makkal Katchi (PMK), Rashtriya Janata Dal (RJD), Rashtriya Lok Dal (RLD), Samajwadi Party (SP), Shiromani Akali Dal (SAD), Shiv Sena (SS), Telugu Desam Party (TDP) and YSR Congress Party (YSRCP).

=== Political alliances ===
A coalition government is a form of government in which political parties cooperate to form a government. The usual reason for such an arrangement is that no single party has achieved an absolute majority after an election. Political parties of such a coalition government forms an alliance for contesting election together usually for better prospects. Alliance usually revolves around the BJP and INC, being the two largest political parties in India without whose support, it would be difficult to form a majority government.

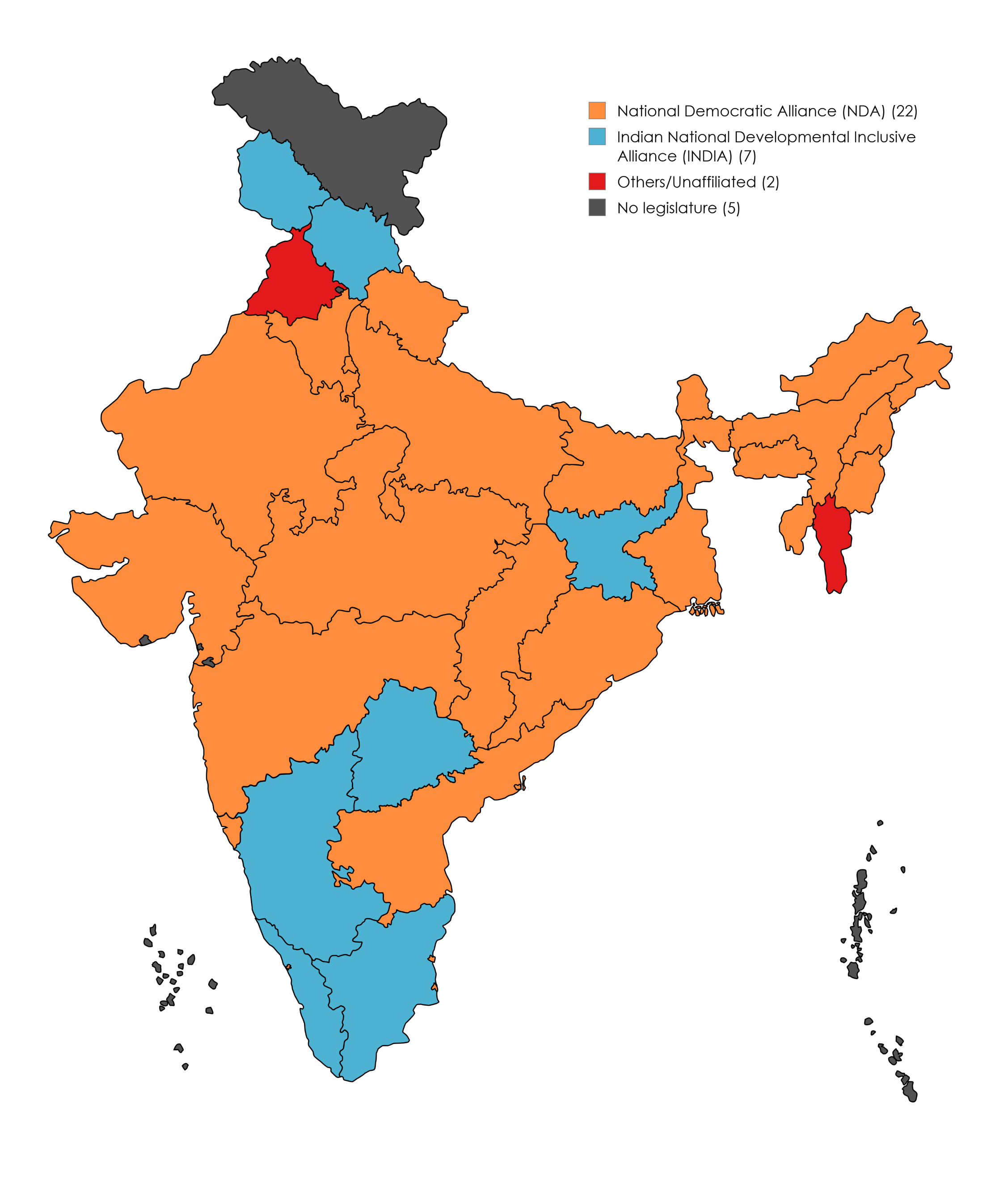
Ruling parties and alliances in various state govts and UT in India. NDA (22)/UT(5) I.N.D.I.A (7) Unaligned (2) No legislature (5)

==== National Democratic Alliance (NDA) ====
National Democratic Alliance (NDA), a centre-right to right-wing coalition led by the BJP, was formed following the 1998 general election. The alliance formed the government under the leadership of Atal Bihari Vajpayee, with outside support from the Telugu Desam Party (TDP). However, the government fell after J. Jayalalithaa withdrew support of the All India Anna Dravida Munnetra Kazhagam (AIADMK), leading to the 1999 general election, in which NDA returned to power with an absolute majority. The coalition government went on to complete the full five-years term, becoming the first non-Congress government to do so.

After securing a defeating in 2004 General Election and 2009 General Elections against the United Progressive Alliance (UPA), the NDA once again returned to power in the 2014 General Elections, for the second time, with a historic mandate of 336 out of 543 Lok Sabha seats. BJP itself won 282 seats, thereby electing Narendra Modi as the head of the government. In a historic win, the NDA stormed to power for the third term in 2019 with a combined strength of 353 seats, with the BJP itself winning an absolute majority with 303 seats.

In the 2024 Indian general election the NDA, though lost a couple of seats, succeeded to form the government by winning 293 seats with a major support from allies like TDP (16 seats) and Janata Dal (United) (12 seats).

==== United Progressive Alliance (UPA) ====
The United Progressive Alliance was a political alliance in India led by the Indian National Congress. It was formed after the 2004 general election with support from left-leaning political parties when no single party got the majority.

The UPA subsequently governed India from 2004 until 2014 for 2 terms before losing power to their main rivals, the BJP-led National Democratic Alliance. With strong corruption history within the alliance and becoming increasingly unpopular among the masses, the UPA was dissolved to form the Indian National Developmental Inclusive Alliance on 18 July 2023 ahead of the 2024 general election. The UPA used to rule 7 States and union territories of India before it was dissolved.

==== Indian National Developmental Inclusive Alliance (I.N.D.I.A) ====
Unable to defeat the NDA in 2014 General Election and 2019 General Election, and with Congress performing its poorest in same, many political leaders understood the need for a grand alliance of almost all major political parties to stand against the BJP led NDA in the 2024 General Elections which resulted in the formation of the Indian National Developmental Inclusive Alliance (I.N.D.I.A). It was formed by merger of United Progressive Alliance (UPA), Left Front and other smaller alliances, centre-left to left-wing coalition led by Indian National Congress (INC). The alliance, comprising 26 opposition parties, include many political parties that are at loggerhead with the INC in their respective states and territories but are in alliance for the 2024 General Elections.

== Political issues ==
A 2026 opinion poll found the most important issues according to Indian people are unemployment, inflation and poverty.

=== Law and order ===
Terrorism, Naxalism, religious violence, and caste-related violence are significant issues affecting the political environment of India. Stringent anti-terror legislation such as TADA and POTA received significant political attention before being disbanded due to human rights violations. In 2019, the Unlawful Activities (Prevention) Act (UAPA) was amended to allow the government to designate individuals as "terrorists" without a prior judicial trial, a move criticized by rights groups for its potential for misuse and lack of due process.

Terrorism has influenced Indian politics since independence, involving both external state-sponsored terrorism and internal groups. The 1991 assassination of former Prime Minister Rajiv Gandhi by the Liberation Tigers of Tamil Eelam remains a landmark political event. Additionally, internal insurgencies like Naxalism have seen a sharp decline in recent years; by 2025, the number of "most-affected" districts dropped from 36 in 2014 to just 3, with the government aiming for total eradication by March 2026.

Communal and ethnic violence continue to pose challenges. The 1992 Babri Masjid demolition and subsequent 1993 Bombay bombings set a precedent for religious polarization. More recently, the 2023–2026 Manipur conflict between the Meitei and Kuki-Zo communities resulted in over 250 deaths and the displacement of 60,000 people, significantly impacting the political discourse in Northeast India.

While law and order issues like organized crime are often discussed, a persistent "criminal–politician nexus" characterizes the electoral landscape. Following the 2024 Indian general election, an analysis by the Association for Democratic Reforms (ADR) revealed that 46% of newly elected Members of Parliament faced criminal charges, with 31% facing "serious" criminal charges such as murder, rape, or kidnapping. Legislative efforts to address this include the proposed Constitution (130th Amendment) Bill, 2025, which seeks the automatic removal of ministers if they are detained for more than 30 days for serious offences.

== State of democracy ==
The assessment of Indian democracy between 2006 and 2026 has been a subject of significant debate, characterized by a dichotomy between high electoral engagement and international concerns over institutional health. While India continues to conduct the world's largest democratic exercises—with nearly 970 million voters eligible in the 2024 general elections—various global indices have lowered their rankings of the country's democratic status.

=== International indices and critiques ===
Starting in the early 2020s, several international organizations downgraded India’s democratic classifications:

- Freedom House: In its Freedom in the World report, India was moved from "Free" to "Partly Free" in 2021, a status it has maintained due to what the report describes as a "multiphase campaign to shore up Hindu nationalist policies" and "increased pressure on independent media."
- V-Dem Institute: Categorized India as an "electoral autocracy" in 2023, citing a decline in freedom of expression and the suppression of dissent.

=== Government of India perspective ===
The Indian government and various domestic commentators have rejected these findings as biased and methodologically flawed.

- Methodological Criticism: The Government of India has formally questioned the "transparency" of these indices, arguing they rely on the subjective opinions of a small set of "experts" rather than hard data.
- National Sovereignty: Officials state that the FCRA is essential for ensuring that foreign funding does not influence domestic policy or fund illegal activities, arguing that all organizations must adhere to national law.
- Democratic Inclusivity: Supporters of the administration point to the "deepening" of democracy through the delivery of public goods via digital infrastructure, which they argue empowers citizens more effectively than traditional liberal frameworks.

=== Internal security and Naxalism ===
The domestic security landscape has seen a major transition. While the Naxalite–Maoist insurgency was previously considered a primary threat to state presence in tribal areas, the movement has largely been neutralized.

- Decline of Insurgency: By 2024, the Ministry of Home Affairs reported a 70% to 80% reduction in Naxal-related violence compared to the 2010 peak. The government states that the "Red Corridor" has shrunk significantly, with state presence and infrastructure—such as roads, schools, and hospitals—returning to previously unreachable tribal districts.
- Social Tensions: Despite the decline in armed rebellions, international observers continue to express concern over inter-religious tensions and the role of Hindu nationalist groups. Conversely, the government notes that major communal riots have become less frequent in the last decade compared to historical averages, attributing this to better law enforcement and social stability.

== See also ==
- Electronic voting in India
  - Electoral fraud
  - Electoral Bonds
  - Voter suppression
  - Booth capturing
  - Scientific rigging
  - 2025 Indian electoral controversy
- Election Commission of India
- Political funding in India
- Blasphemy law in India
- Censorship in India
- Electoral reform
- Democracy in India
- Caste politics
- Caste system in India
- Caste-related violence in India
- Mandal Commission
- Reservation in India
- 2011 Socio Economic and Caste Census
- Disqualification of convicted representatives in India
- Operation Kamala
- Aaya Ram Gaya Ram
- History of democracy in ancient India
- List of scandals in India
- List of communist parties in India
- Trade unions in India
- Political families of India
- State governments of India
- Foreign relations of India
- Secularism in India
- Anarchism in India
- Conservatism in India
- Liberalism in India
- Socialism in India
- Communism in India
- Communism in Kerala
- Communist movements in India
- Revolutionary movement for Indian independence
- Communist involvement in the Indian independence movement
