= Matihani Assembly constituency =

Matihani
- Constituency No. 144 for the Bihar Legislative Assembly

Constituency details
- Country: India
- Region: East India
- State: Bihar
- District: Begusarai
- Lok Sabha constituency: Begusarai
- Established: 1977
- Total electors: 354,216
- Reservation: None

Member of Legislative Assembly
- 18th Bihar Legislative Assembly
- Incumbent Narendra Kumar Singh
- Party: RJD
- Alliance: MGB
- Elected year: 2025

Matihani Assembly constituency is an assembly constituency in Begusarai district in the Indian state of Bihar.

== Overview ==
As per Delimitation of Parliamentary and Assembly constituencies Order, 2008, No. 144 Matihani Assembly constituency is composed of the following: Matihani and Shambo Akha Kurha community development blocks; Kaithma, Laduwara, Bhairwar, Maniappa, Chilmil, Dumri, Ulao, Sighaul, Pachmba, Mahmadpur Raghunathpur, Mohan Eghu, Shahpur, Bishanpur, Dhabauli, Bindpur, Puspura, Bahadarpur, Amraur Kiratpur, Rachiyahi gram panchayats of Begusarai CD Block; Barauni IOC Township (CT); and Keshawe, Noorpur, Mahna and Mosadpur gram panchayats of Barauni CD Block.

Matihani Assembly constituency is part of No. 24 Begusarai (Lok Sabha constituency) and as per the delimitation in 2008, falls within Begusarai town.

== Members of the Legislative Assembly ==
Year	Name	Party
Until 1977: Constituency did not exist
1977	Sitaram Mishra	Communist Party of India
1979^	Devkinandan Singh	Communist Party of India
1980	Pramod Kumar Sharma	Indian National Congress (I)
1985	Pramod Kumar Sharma	Indian National Congress
1990	Rajendra Rajan	Communist Party of India
1995	Rajendra Rajan	Communist Party of India
2000	Rajendra Rajan	Communist Party of India
2005	Narendra Kumar Singh	Independent
2005	Narendra Kumar Singh	Independent
2010	Narendra Kumar Singh	Janata Dal (United)
2015	Narendra Kumar Singh	Janata Dal (United)
2020	Rajkumar Singh	Lok Janshakti Party
2025	Narendra Kumar Singh	Rashtriya Janata Dal

^by-election

== Election results ==
=== 2025 ===
Bihar Assembly election, 2025: Matihani
Party	Candidate	Votes	%	±%
RJD	Narendra Kumar Singh	117,789	47.66	
JD(U)	Rajkumar Singh	112,499	45.52	+16.04
JSP	Arun Kumar	6,774	2.74	
Independent	Vikash Kumar	2,976	1.2	
NOTA	None of the above	4,337	1.75	−1.5
Majority		5,290	2.14	+1.98
Turnout		247,152	69.77	+8.67
RJD gain from JD(U)		Swing		

=== 2020 ===
Bihar Assembly election, 2020: Matihani
Party	Candidate	Votes	%	±%
LJP	Rajkumar Singh	61,364	29.64	
JD(U)	Narendra Kumar Singh	61,031	29.48	
CPI(M)	Rajendra Prasad Singh	60,599	29.27	
Independent	Amresh Ray	4,378	2.11	
Independent	Hemant Kumar	3,258	1.57	
Independent	Saurabh	2,500	1.21	
NOTA	None of the above	6,733	3.25	
Majority		333	0.16	−12.28
Turnout		207,048	61.1	+1.32
LJP gain from JD(U)		Swing		

=== 2015 ===
Bihar Assembly election, 2015: Matihani
Party	Candidate	Votes	%	±%
JD(U)	Narendra Kumar Singh	89,297	48.97	
BJP	Sarvesh Kumar	66,609	36.53	
CPI	Shobha Devi	11,232	6.16	
Independent	Pravin Kumar	2,311	1.27	
NOTA	None of the above	7,067	3.88	
Majority		22,688	12.44	
Turnout		182,354	59.78	
JD(U) hold		Swing		

=== 2010 ===
In the 2010 state assembly elections, Narendra Kumar Singh of JD(U) won the Matihani seat defeating his nearest rival Abhay Kumar Sarjan of Congress. Contests in most years were multi cornered but only winners and runners up are being mentioned. Narendra Kumar Singh, Independent, defeated Abhay Kumar Singh of Congress in Bihar Assembly Election, October 2005 and Rajendra Rajan of CPI in February 2005. Rajendra Rajan of CPI defeated Pramod Kumar Sharma of Congress in 2000, 1995 and 1990, Pramod Kumar Sharma of Congress/ Congress(I) defeated Deoki Nandan Singh of CPI in 1985 and 1980, Sitaram Mishra of CPI defeated Mithilesh Kumar Singh of Janata Party in 1977.

=== 1957 ===
The first instance of booth capturing in India was recorded in 1957 in the General Elections of that year in Rachiyahi, in Begusarai's Matihani assembly seat.
