= Electoral reform in India =

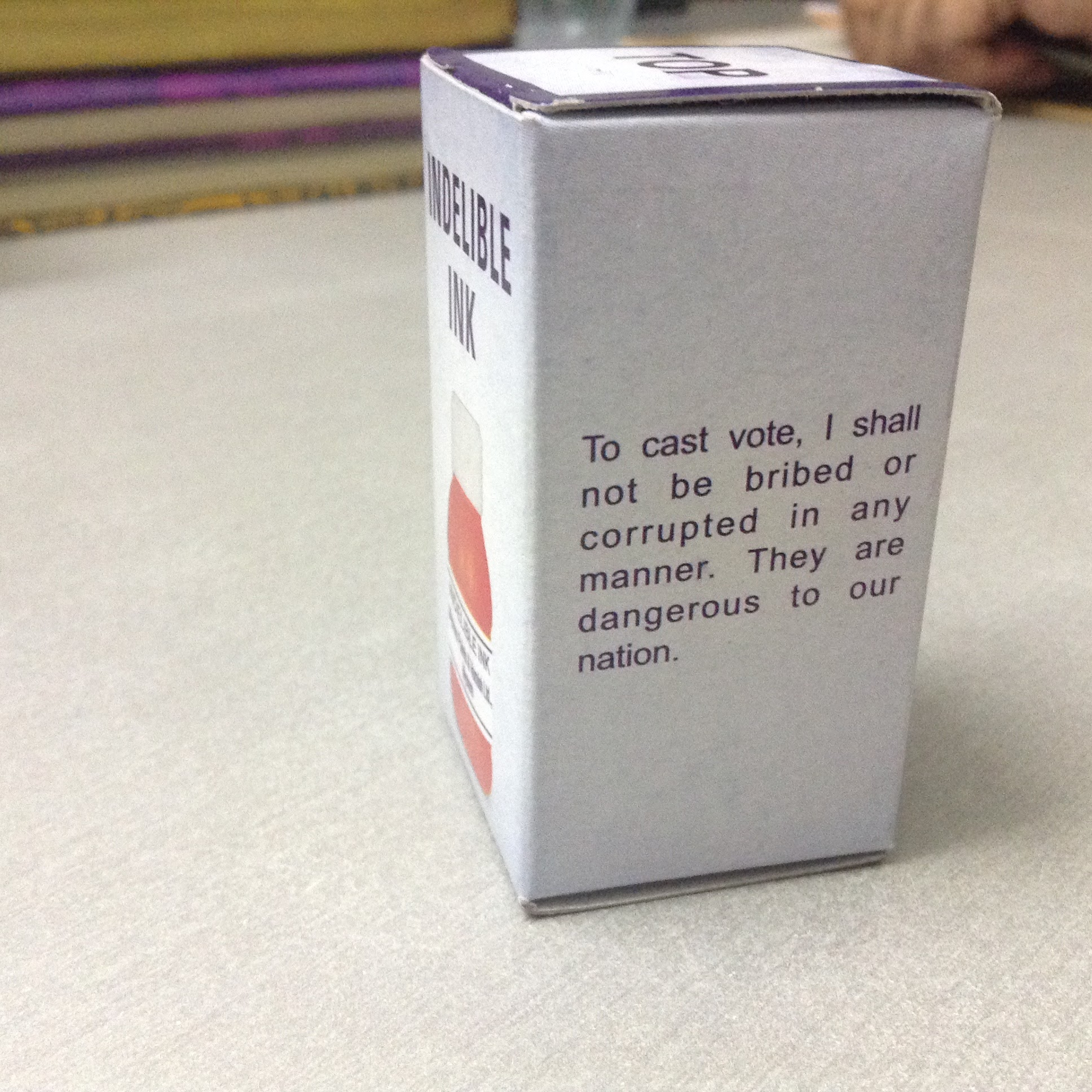
Pledge in the Indelible Ink Bottle Package - "To cast vote, I shall not be bribed or corrupted in any manner. They are dangerous to our nation."

A number of measures have been suggested to improvise and strengthen the existing electoral practices in India.

== Political parties in India ==
Since 1952, when the first election ended, various reforms have addressed the issue of party funding. However, the current situation is as follows:

- According to a study by the Centre for Media Studies, ₹30,000 crore (equivalent to ₹520 billion or US$5.4 billion in 2026) was projected to be spent in the 2014 general election by government, political parties, and candidates. Official spending by the Election Commission of India and the Government of India was around Rs. 7,000-8,000 crores—i.e. elections have become very expensive for political parties.
- The Association for Democratic Reforms (ADR) in a report published on 25 January 2017 states that the total declared income of national and regional parties between 2004-2005 and 2014-2015 stood at Rs. 11,367 crores. Total income from known donors was 16% (Rs. 1,835 crore) and total income from other known sources including membership fees, bank interest, etc. was 15% (Rs. 1,698 crore) leaving 69% (Rs. 7,833 crore) of the total income from unknown sources (contributions below Rs. 20,000 each), and thus untraceable. Comparing audited income with projected spending seems to indicate that political parties earned an additional large amount of black money.
- In a 9 May 2014 on the Lok Sabha Elections of 2014, ADR shows that out of the total 8,163 contesting candidates, 1,398 (17%) had criminal cases pending against them; 889 (11%) with serious criminal cases and 2,208 (27%) were crorepatis, i.e. capable of funding their own election campaigns. Thus, one could conclude that the reforms instituted till date have largely failed and could even be considered responsible for driving parties into a greater dependency on black money, and rich criminal elements to contest elections.

== Committees that covered political funding reform ==
The problem with political party funding reform is that the reformer and the reformee are one and the same. In other words, a conflict of interest is built into the system. When pressed to do something by public outrage due to a breaking scandal, a committee will be constituted to study the matter and make suggestions. If public pressure is not maintained, the committee's suggestions will either be implemented in a diluted form, or sometimes, ignored altogether. From the 1960s onwards, the committees that have been constituted have used key terms that indicate the different facets to the problem of political funding reform, which are still relevant today.

Speed money: Gets things done and creates a “tendency to subvert integrity in the public services instead of being isolated and aberrative is growing into an organised, well-planned racket.”

Parallel economy: Has been referred to be operating simultaneously and competing with the 'official' economy. Property dealings have been “a significant avenue of illegal deals, with ratios of 'white' and 'black' payments being freely mentioned”.

Delayed action: There has been a great lag in the implementation of committee recommendations. For example, in 1964, the Santhanam Committee recommended the setting up of a Central Vigilance Commission (CVC) as the apex probity watchdog to address governmental corruption. However it achieved the status of statutory autonomous body free from any executive authority only 39 years later, when the Central Vigilance Commission (CVC) Act of 2003 was legislated.

Some of the reforms undertaken are listed below and are the responses of the government of the day to both external and internal pressures to do something. They are broken up by source (who pushed for and/or made it happen) and listed chronologically within each heading to underscore the fact that different times needed different solutions. The Finance Bill 2017, largely considered a regressive bill as concerns political party funding, appears to indicate what can happen when a party comes under intense pressure to generate funds to contest an upcoming election.

Lack of transparency (and coordination): The government established the Vohra committee in 1993—it unequivocally confirmed linkages between crime and politicians. The mandate of the committee was to take stock of all available information about the activities of crime syndicates or mafia which had developed links with and were being protected by government functionaries and political personalities. The report recommended the setting up of a Nodal Cell that would serve as a collection point for relevant information collected by various government agencies such as the Central Bureau of Investigation (CBI), Research And Analysis Wing (R&AW), Intelligence Bureau (IB), Central Board of Excise and Customs (CBEC), Central Board of Direct Taxes (CBDT), Central Economic Intelligence Bureau (CEIB), Enforcement Directorate (ED) and Narcotics Control Bureau (NCB).

Section 11.1 of the Vohra committee report: "In sum, the various agencies presently in the field take care to essentially focus on their respective charter of duties, dealing with the infringement of laws relating to their organisations and consciously putting aside any information on linkages which they may come across."

The final Vohra report did not reveal any specific names of individual politicians or bureaucrats but only stated in a general manner that what was already widely known and talked about for years. All attempts via RTI to get at the minutes and file notings of the meetings that were held by the committee and would have provided real information have failed. The Ministry of Home Affairs (MHA) declined to share the file notings of the committee meetings, terming them as “secret”.

=== Committee Quotes About Political Funding ===
- Wanchoo committee report, 1970 (Section 2.20): "In this connection, it has been pointed out that large funds are required to meet election expenses and it is common knowledge that these are financed to a great extent by wealthy persons with lots of black money. According to some, this is not the cause but an outlet for black money. The situation is stated to have been further aggravated by the ban imposed recently on donations by companies to political parties."
- Dinesh Goswami committee report, 1990 (Section 1.6): "The role of money and muscle power at elections ... rapid criminalisation of politics .... increasing menace of participation of non- serious candidates; form the core of our electoral problems."
- Vohra committee report, 1993 (Section 10.1): "The various crime Syndicates/Mafia organisations have developed significant muscle and money power and established linkages with government functionaries, political leaders and others to be able to operate with impunity".
- The Supreme Court in its judgement (20/3/1997) in connection with the murder of political activist Naina Sahni: “..have developed an extensive network of contacts with bureaucrats, government functionaries at lower levels, politicians, media personalities, strategically located persons in the non-Governmental sector and members of the judiciary”

== Reforms ==
The Representation of the People Act (RPA) of 1951 provided the first set of rules for the conduct of elections to the Houses of Parliament and State Legislatures. Over the years the RPA has been amended to reflect changing circumstances. Political party funding reform has been enacted via changes to the Company Law, via Money Bills, the Income Tax Law, through Supreme Court orders, etc.

=== Anti Defection Law ===
The Anti-Defection Law was passed in 1985 through the 52nd Amendment to the Constitution. The main intent of the law was to combat “the evil of political defections” by elected politicians for the lure of office.It mainly focus on crime background of any political leader before registering his/her name for election.

=== Association for Democratic Reforms (ADR) ===
[1994] A writ petition was filed by ADR in the Supreme Court for direction to implement the recommendations made by the Law Commission in its 170th report regarding:

- Debarring a candidate from contesting elections if charges have been framed against him/her by a Court in respect of certain offences.
- Candidates be required to furnish details of criminal cases pending against them.
- Candidates be required to provide true and correct statement of assets owned by them.

[2015] A PIL was filed by ADR to bring political parties under the Right to Information Act 2015, on the basis of the ruling by the CIC of 03/06/2013 (see below)

[2015] A PIL was filed by ADR requesting the constitution of an independent body to administer enforcement of Foreign Contribution (Regulation) Act, 2010 (FCRA)

=== Central Information Commission (CIC) ===
[1969] Under Section 293a of the Companies Act, 1956, companies were prohibited from making contributions to a political party or for any political purpose. The ban on company donations was not accompanied by an alternate source of funding as a substitute, e.g. state funding. This greatly increased politicians' reliance on black money to fund elections.

[1985] The Companies (Amendment) Act, 1985 permitted companies to make political contributions up to 5% of the average net profit of the last three years provided a resolution authorising such contributions is passed by the Board of Directors and the company discloses the contribution details in its Profit & Loss Account. It has been noted by some observers that companies continued to make donations to political parties in black money preferring the anonymity of this route. The cap was increased to 7.5% in 2013.

[2008] Tax filings of political parties remained confidential and were not disclosed to the public until 2008. Using the provisions of the Right to Information Act 2005, the CIC allowed disclosure of parties' income tax returns

[2013] The CIC ruled that political parties can be held to be public authorities and come within the ambit of the Right to Information Act Companies Act.

[2013] After the CIC ruling, all the political parties banded together and backed "The Right to Information (Amendment) Bill, 2013" which was introduced in the Lok Sabha on August 12, 2013, amending the original act (RTI 2005). The Amendment removes political parties from the scope of the definition of "public authorities". Thus political parties in India no longer fall under the dimensions of RTI. This amendment was met by huge protests from the civil rights societies and the general public.

=== Confederation of Indian Industry (CII) ===
[1993] A task force set up by the CII recommended that corporate contribution by companies be made tax-deductible and that shareholder confirmation of board decisions about political contribution be required. It also recommended state funding of elections with the funds to be raised either by a cess on excise duty or through contributions by industry to an elections fund pool., i.e. a tax on industry to finance campaigns. Money would be distributed according to a formula. Nothing came of this.

=== Election Commission of India (ECI) ===
[1998] ECI Press Note, 15 January 1998: Partial state subsidy in the form of free time for seven national and 34 state parties on the state-owned television and radio networks totalling 61 hours of each of the two media. The limit of election expenditure imposed on contesting candidates is revised from time to time by the Union of India through the ECI.

[2011] Big states: Rs. 40,00,000 for Lok Sabha elections and Rs. 16,00,000 for State Assembly elections.

[2014] Big states: Rs. 70,00,000 for Lok Sabha elections and Rs. 28,00,000 for State Assembly elections. According to a study by ADR, analysis of the expenditure statements of candidates to the ECI after the poll results were announced, indicated that the average election expenditure was 49% of the limit imposed. This seems to indicate that these limits have no practical value. There is no limit on the expenditure a party can incur during its election campaigns.

=== Supreme Court judgement on RPA overturned ===
[1975] Parliament amended the Representation of Peoples Act to nullify a Supreme Court judgement of 1974 (see Supreme Court Rulings below). Specifically, Parliament amended Explanation 1 to Section 77(1) of the RPA so that party and supporters’ expenditures not authorised by a candidate did not count while calculating their election expenses. This effectively opened a back door to unlimited spending and is a typical example of the conflict of interest inherent in parliamentary legislation in areas of self-interest.

=== Income Tax Law ===
[1979] Taxation Laws (Amendment) Act 1978 exempted income received by a political party by voluntary contributions from any person from inclusion in the total party income. Income Tax exemption was allowed only if (a) audited accounts were maintained and (b) the party maintains a record of the names and addresses of all contributors donating Rs. 20,000 or above. This is generally considered a loophole to allow unlimited donations by simply breaking up larger donations into smaller ones....

=== Supreme Court Rulings ===
[1974] The Supreme Court ruled in “Kanwar Lala Gupta vs Amar Nath Chawla & Ors” that party spending on behalf of a candidate should be included in calculating that candidate's election expenses in order to determine whether the election expenditure limit had been violated. This was nullified by amending the RPA in 1975.

[1997] On December 18, 1997 in Writ Petitions Nos. 340-343/93 Vineet Narain and other versus Union of India and others (aka Jain Havala Case), the Supreme Court issued directions to establish institutional and other arrangements aimed at insulating the CBI from outside influences. The judgment also declared the Single Directive null and void. The Single Directive was a set of executive instructions issued to the CBI by the Central Government prohibiting it from initiating inquiry/investigation against officers of the rank of joint secretary and above without obtaining prior permission of the government.

[2013] NOTA was introduced in India following the 2013 Supreme Court directive in the People's Union for Civil Liberties vs. Union of India judgment. The Court directed the Election Commission to introduce a “ None of the Above [NOTA] ” option into the Electronic Voting Machines. This allows voters the option of expressing their dissent against all the contestants. For instance, In Kerala, a group of women activists urged people not to elect a candidate if no woman was present in the fray. In Tamil Nadu, a youth group campaigned for NOTA as a protest vote against corruption.

=== Finance Bills [2017] ===
On February 1, 2017, The Finance Bill (2017) was introduced in Lok Sabha.

==== Background ====
Before the bill came into effect,

(i) - a company donating to a political party could contribute up to 7.5% of the average of its net profits in the last three financial years.

(ii) - And it was required to disclose the amount of contributions made to any political parties along with the name of the political parties to which such contribution was made.

==== Amendments in the Finance Bills [2017] ====
The Finance Bill [2017] amends to

(i) Remove the cap limit on the companies for contributions that they could make to any political parties.

(ii) And also removing the requirement of a company to disclose the name of the political parties to which it was contributing.

The bill further adds that "contributions will have to be made only through a cheque, bank draft, electronic means, or any other scheme notified by the government to make contributions to political parties."

(iii) It introduces "Electoral Bonds" as a means to make anonymous contributions to political parties. These bonds will be issued by the State Bank of India.

=== Electoral Bonds ===
Introduced with the Finance Bill (2017), Electoral Bonds allow donors to pay political parties with banks as an intermediary. These bonds can only be issued by the State Bank of India.

Range of a bond - Rs 1000 to Rs 1 crore.

Availability - 10 days each in the months of January, April, July, and October, with an additional period of 30 days specified by the central government in the year of general elections.

Validity - 15 days (from the date of issue)

Any person who is a citizen of India or entities incorporated or established in India can buy electoral bonds. And then donate it to the political party of choice "anonymously". To buy and transfer these bonds, the person or entity has to provide some authentication details to the bank but the names of donors are kept confidential, even from political parties. Anonymity is intended to prevent the political victimization of the donor.

There is no limit on the quantity of bonds that can be purchased by an individual or a company. The bonds donated to political party must be encased within 15 days through its verified account, failed to so, the issuer of these bonds i.e.State Bank of India deposits these into Prime Minister's Relief Fund.Explained: Why is the electoral bond scheme being opposed by transparency activists?

=== Criticism of Electoral Bonds ===
In a series of articles investigating the Electoral Bonds, Nitin Sethi with Huffpost India studied a compilation of documents collected through RTI queries by Commodore Lokesh Batra over a span of 2 years. The RTI documents went on to revel serious problems with the Electoral Bonds Scheme and its implementation. In July 2022, the amount of donations through electoral bonds crossed Rs 10,000-Crore mark as per government data.

==== Election Commission ====
The Election Commission expressed its opposition to Electoral Bonds during a hearing on the electoral bonds issue in the Supreme Court, citing its affidavit filled with the Law Ministry in 2017, terming it "a retrograde step". The poll panel led by senior advocate Rakesh Dwivedi during the course of the hearing expressed concern over the anonymity of donor identity and clauses that may allow for shell companies and foreign entities/companies to fund (with no cap limits) and influence Indian elections. The Election Commission argued in court that "the scheme "legalizes anonymity" but the right to vote means making an informed choice - knowing the candidate was only "half of the exercise" and citizens must know the parties which are funding the candidates."

In a letter to Law Ministry written in May 2017, Election Commission stated “In a situation where the contribution received through electoral bonds are not reported, on perusal of the contribution report of political parties, it cannot be ascertained whether the political party has taken any donation in violation of provision under Section 29(b) of the RP Act which prohibits the political parties from taking donations from government companies and foreign sources.”

==== Civil Rights Societies ====
The introduction of Electoral Bonds received huge criticism from the civil rights societies and even the public in general. The concept of donor "anonymity" threatens the very spirit of democracy. The Association for Democratic Reforms (ADR), a non-governmental organisation (NGO) argues that the additional amendments done in different Acts to pave the way for electoral bonds have "opened the floodgates to unlimited corporate donations to political parties and anonymous financing by Indian as well as foreign companies, which can have serious repercussions on Indian democracy". Opposition parties argue that this move keeps the political parties and the voters in dark, and at the same time only the ruling party has all the access to contribution records through state mechanisms like SBI and Income Tax Department.

In a statement Association for Democratic Reforms (ADR)stated that "It may also be noted that the printing of these bonds & SBI commission for facilitating the sale and purchase of the bonds is paid from the taxpayers’ money by the central government.” ADR along with Common Cause another non-profit organization has moved to Supreme Court in 2017. Court had sought response from government and EC. However till March 2021 the case has not been heard in detail.

==== RBI ====
An investigative article published by HuffPost India on November 18, 2019, examines a series of documents which show how the Reserve Bank of India was critical of the Electoral Bonds Schemes on multiple occasions, and how the Government of India ignored the concerns of the RBI time and time again and went ahead with its plans for the Electoral Bonds. The RBI said that the bonds would "undermine the faith in Indian banknotes and encourage money laundering."

The report highlighted the gap between the RBI's concerns and the government's final decision.

=== Switch to a proportional system ===
Calls for a switch from First past the post to a proportional system have been growing since 2017, in lights of several states elections whose results have shown large wins in seats by parties receiving far less than 50 % of the popular votes

== Important events in India's History of Electoral Reform ==
These can be summed up in the table shown below:

Table: Important Events in India's history of Electoral Reform
Year	Committee name/Organisation	Mandate	Key Recommendations	Relevant Sections
1962	Santhanam	Problem of corruption and remedial action	Recommended setting up of Central Vigilance Commission (CVC). States that Article 311 of the Constitution makes it very difficult to deal effectively with corrupt public servants	2.10, 2.12, 2.14
1964	Central Vigilance Commission	Santhanam committee recommended CVC should have the power to undertake inquiries where public servants are suspected to have acted in a corrupt manner.	However CVC given certain power through legislation to enable undertaking enquiries unimplemented until 2003 when the CVC Act 2003 was legislated.	
1970	Wanchoo Direct Taxes Enquiry Committee	Concrete and effective measures to unearth black money and prevent its proliferation, evasion and tax avoidance	Recommended regulation of donations to political parties and financing of political parties by the Government according to some formula.	2.4, 2.6, 2.20
1990	Dinesh Goswami Committee	On Electoral reforms	Recommended that Election Commission should lay down ceiling on maximum election expenditure instead of Central Government. Any unauthorised expenditure incurred by any person other than the candidate or his election agent should be prohibited and treated as an electoral offence (punishable with imprisonment for a period of not less than one year). Recommended amendment to RPA to read as: “(1) All expenditure incurred or authorised either by the candidate or his election agent on account of or in respect of the conduct or management of the election shall be required to be included in the account of election expenditure of the candidate” (see RPA 1975 below) There should be a complete ban on donations by companies. Suggests that state assistance be in kind only and be extended by (1) prescribed quantity of fuel to vehicles (2) supply of additional copies of electoral rolls (3) payment of hire charges for prescribed number of microphones (4) distribution of voters' identity slips should be undertaken exclusively by electoral machinery	Chapter 7 (1.2, 1.5, 2.8, 2.9, 3.2)
1993	Vohra committee	Activities of crime syndicates/mafia and links between government functionaries and political personalities	Recommended creation of Nodal Cell that would serve as a collection point for relevant information collected by various government agencies like Central Bureau of Investigation (CBI), Research And Analysis Wing (R&AW), Intelligence Bureau (IB), Central Board of Excise & Customs (CBEC), Central Board of Direct Taxes (CBDT), Central Economic Intelligence Bureau (CEIB), Enforcement Directorate (ED) and Narcotics Control Bureau (NCB).	11.1
1997	Supreme Court judgement	In connection of murder of political activist Naina Sahni	After no action was taken, the Vohra report was tabled in parliament and a Nodal Cell duly constituted.	

== Challenges to electoral reform ==
Improving the electoral process has manifold challenges:

- Transparency and Honesty: Provide political parties with legal ways of sourcing funds in adequate quantities. Voters should ideally have all information on political activities, including political finance, before casting their votes. In addition, parties and elected officials have a duty to serve the public interest; therefore, their “business” cannot be shrouded in secrecy 13 . Parties must also be weaned away from accepting funding from illegal sources.
- Accountability: This is required to mitigate the risks of conflict of interest and corruption in the political process.
- Responsiveness to change: Election funding reform must be constantly monitored for adverse side-effects and these must be corrected in a timely fashion. A method needs to be devised to be able to implement required re- form which is often diluted or even blocked by the political parties if it does not suit them.
- The "arms-race" effect: Find ways to reduce the overall cost of contesting elections for all parties and candidates while maintaining a level playing field for all.
- Criminals: Blocking the entry of criminal elements into the election process is a must. “Winnability” as the main criterion for choosing candidates must be strongly discouraged by the voters.
- Conceptualising corruption: Corruption needs to be conceptualised soundly else prescriptions will be flawed.
- Rigorous implementation of the law: Finally and most importantly, should ensure the rigorous implementation of existing laws to prosecute and disqualify politicians breaking the law, in a timely fashion. For instance, the ECI re- ported that during the Lok Sabha 2014 elections, around Rs. 300 crores of unaccounted cash, more than 17,000 kg of drugs and huge amount of liquor, arms, and other materials were seized. One does not hear of a correspondingly large number of candidates being disqualified.

== Moving forward ==
It is expected that electoral reforms will contribute to better participation of the citizens in electoral practices, reduce corruption and strengthen democracy in India. More than 3000 crores were spent by the government for conducting the 2014 Loksabha elections.

The article been political party funding, the challenges it faces and the reform initiatives that have been undertaken over the years to contain the political corruption that has invaded Indian democracy. N. Ram concludes succinctly in his book:

There is no such thing as political corruption as a self-contained category. If the objective is to understand corruption in India in its pervasiveness, its omnipresence, and its multifariousness, so that something meaningful and effective can be done about it, it needs to be approached as a problem not just of politics, or the economy or society, not to mention the moral sphere- but of political economy in its profound sense.

This is a long term undertaking, though necessary, if India is ever to move away from its thoroughly corrupt situation. Not all corruption is the same. Some forms of corruption are worse than others. e.g. the handover of land to mining companies disregarding the environmental consequences is different from giving money for votes. One needs to distinguish corruption that is grossly damaging from that which is less so.

Since the challenge is on many fronts, it must be responded to strategically, in stages, and with an eye to weakening and undermining corruption's base rather than concentrating on its symptoms.

In the short term: (a) strict implementation of existing laws to fight corruption rather than constantly creating new ones when a problem arises, and then not implementing it forcefully, (b) appeals to the judiciary to strike down regressive political finance legislation, (c) popular protests against harmful decisions taken by the government e.g. redefining coconut trees as grass to allow rampant tree felling to benefit some company, would help.

== See also ==
- Combined Approval Voting
- None of the above (India)
- Political funding in India
