= Political funding in India =

Revenue generation by political parties in India

Political funding in India is a major concern under need for electoral reforms in India. The financing of the world's most extensive electoral process remains a perplexing issue, as the involvement of businesses in supporting both disclosed and undisclosed expenditures during elections has been a matter of public knowledge for a considerable period.

On 21 December 2020, the Central Information Commission issued a verdict that political parties cannot be classified as "public authorities" and hence the disclosure of information regarding the funding of political parties is not mandatory for voters and citizens.

== Political Parties ==
As per a notification dated 23 September 2021 released by the Election Commission, there exist eight National Parties and over 60 State Parties. It also recognizes and mentions an approximate count of 3,000 Registered Unrecognised Political Parties (RUPP). RUPPs encompass newly established parties, those unable to attain a sufficient vote share in State Assembly or Lok Sabha elections to attain state party status, or those that have abstained from participating in elections since their registration.

As politics keeps expanding, tracking party funds and following election rules has become less transparent.

== Income ==
- Known Sources (includes, but not limited to)
1. Bank Interest
2. Membership Fees
3. Party Levy
4. Sale of Assets
5. Sale of Publications
6. Voluntary donations exceeding ₹20,000
- Unknown Sources (includes, but not limited to)
1. Contribution from meetings/morchas
2. Electoral Bonds
3. Miscellaneous Income
4. Relief Fund
5. Sale of Coupons
6. Voluntary contributions less than ₹20,000

As of 2023, Electoral Bonds emerged as the primary means of income for political parties. The recent unanimous Supreme Court five-judge bench verdict comprising Chief Justice of India, DY Chandrachud, Justices Sanjiv Khanna, BR Gavai, JB Pardiwala, and Manoj Misra on the Electoral Bond has received much attention. It has been hailed as a significant step in bringing the much needed cleaning in the funding of the parties and would set new paradigms for the funding of the political parties.

=== Unknown ===
Donors — individual or corporate — who contribute less than ₹20,000 to any political party in a single tranche are not obligated to disclose their details and their contributions are classified as unknown income. Additionally, after the implementation of Electoral Bonds Scheme in 2018, contributions received through these bonds are also categorized as unknown sources of income.

Top 4 National Parties Income (₹) in FY 2021-22
Party	Total Income	Unknown Sources	% Unknown Sources
Bharatiya Janata Party	1,917 crore	1,161 crore	61%
Trinamool Congress	546 crore	528 crore	97%
Indian National Congress	541 crore	389 crore crore	72%
Communist Party of India (Marxist)	162 crore	79 crore	48%

The aggregate revenue of eight national parties during the fiscal year 2021-22 amounted to ₹3,289 crore. Out of this sum, ₹781 crore was contributed by identified donors, while ₹336 crore originated from various known sources such as the sale of assets, membership fees, bank interest, sale of publications, and party levy, among others. Notably, the remaining ₹2,172 crore, constituting 66% of the total income, was derived from unknown sources.

Top 10 Regional Parties Income (₹) in FY 2021-22
Party	Total Income	Unknown Sources	% Unknown Sources
Dravida Munnetra Kazhagam	318.745 crore	306.025 crore	96%
Biju Janata Dal	307.288 crore	291.096 crore	95%
Bharat Rashtra Samithi	218.112 crore	153.037 crore	70%
YSR Congress Party	93.724 crore	60.0168 crore	64%
Janata Dal (United)	86.555 crore	48.3617 crore	56%
Samajwadi Party	61.011 crore	3.66 crore	6%
Shiromani Akali Dal	25.414 crore	12.1987 crore	48%
All India Anna Dravida Munnetra Kazhagam	25.263 crore	nil	0%
Maharashtra Navnirman Sena	6.7683 crore	5.0762 crore	75%
Telugu Desam Party	6.028 crore	3.667 crore	61%

== Taxation ==
Contributions or donations solely in the form of a bank cheque or digital payments to a registered (under Section 29B of the Representation of the People Act, 1951) political party, including electoral trust, in India during the financial year are eligible for deduction in taxable income under Section 80GGC of the I-T Act, 1969. Donations in the form of cash amounting more than ₹2,000 are deemed ineligible for deduction under this provision.

== Expenses ==
According to the Centre for Media Studies estimations, 2019 Indian general election was expected to see an expense of ₹55,000 crore ($8.6 billion)

Expenditure Division of the Election Commission of India publishes the declared expenditure filed by the political parties in public domain.

== Disclosures ==
Section 29C of the Representation of the People Act, 1951 stipulates specific requirements for public disclosures on the donations received and expenditure made by political parties.

According to a report by ADR, regional political parties garnered an approximate sum of Rs 108 crore during the fiscal year 2015-16 through donations exceeding Rs 20,000. It is noteworthy that this threshold mandates the disclosure of funding sources. Among 16 regional political parties that have publicly acknowledged receiving donations exceeding Rs 20,000, it has come to light that 9 parties, namely Shiv Sena, Aam Aadmi Party, Pattali Makkal Katchi, YSR Congress Party, All India United Democratic Front, Indian Union Muslim League, Maharashtra Navnirman Sena, Shiromani Akali Dal, and Desiya Murpokku Dravida Kazhagam, have neglected to disclose the Permanent Account Number (PAN) details of 1,567 donations. These parties have collectively amassed a substantial sum of Rs 6.79 crore through such undisclosed contributions or "unknown sources".

During the financial years of 2014-15 and 2015–16, a collective of 26 regional political parties have failed to submit their donations report to the Election Commission of India (ECI). Among these parties, 21 have neglected to file their reports for both financial years, while the remaining five (AIUDF, DMDK, JD(S), PMK and Shiv Sena) have submitted their report for 2014-15 but have failed to do so for 2015–16.

A comprehensive study conducted by the Association for Democratic Reforms reveals that 69% of financial resources and contributions acquired by political parties during the period spanning from 2004–05 to 2014-15 originated from undisclosed origins. Income from "unknown sources" is the major chunk of revenue generated by political parties as per their mandatory disclosures.

== Challenges ==
=== Tax Evasion ===
All political parties including RUPPs are "entitled" to acquire contributions from both the general public and various organizations, while simultaneously benefiting from tax exemption as stipulated by the Income Tax Act. Any donations received by the political party are entirely exempt from income tax, thereby affording the donor the opportunity to claim income tax exemption for the donated amount.

As of 2023, tax evasion is a major concern among approximately 3,000 RUPPs in India. There were around 2,300 such parties in March 2019. Since the year 2001, there has been an increase of 300 percent in the number of RUPPs. Election Commission and the income tax authorities often report and take action against those found with "financial irregularities". During its verification drive, the Election Commission discovered that the existence of these parties, in and of itself, does not pose a significant problem. However, the extensive financial fraud in which these organizations are implicated gives rise to apprehensions regarding various financial transgressions, encompassing tax evasion and illicit money transfers. The magnitude of the sums involved in these illicit activities could potentially reach billions of rupees.

EC investigations have revealed that numerous such political parties are engaged in either evading substantial amounts of income tax or participating in money-laundering activities. For instance, Jan Raajya Party of Uttar Pradesh is currently under investigation for suspected efforts to legitimize illicit funds following the demonetization in November 2016. Additionally, there are indications that certain organizations have served as intermediaries for gathering donations intended for purposes unrelated to electoral activities.

The Election Commission furnished the I-T department with details of 2,174 Registered Unrecognized Political Parties that have failed to furnish their mandatory annual financial reports. In September 2022, the Income Tax Department conducted raids on 23 RUPPs across 110 locations.

In September 2022, a kite selling shop — the premises of Sardar Vallabhbhai Patel Party at Dattapada Road in Borivali, Mumbai was subject to a raid conducted by officials of Income Tax Department. The president of the party, Dashrath Bhai Parekh claimed that all financial contributions were legal and the crores of rupees in party's income came from the donors of his political party comprise philanthropic entities, commercial enterprises, textile manufacturers, diamond traders, and real estate professionals.

Jantawadi Congress Party located at Swadeshi Mills Road in Chunabhatti, Mumbai was also found in financial wrongdoings. The party witnessed a remarkable surge in its donation revenue from ₹2,000 in FY 2018–19 to ₹5.83 crore in the next FY 2019–20. Party president Santosh M. Katke resides at the Mhada Colony Slums in Wadala, Mumbai. He was allegedly involved in money laundering activities.

It is noteworthy that the auditor of both political parties — Sardar Vallabhbhai Patel Party and Jantawadi Congress Party — was Kashyap Kumar Ishwarbhai Patel. Furthermore, Patel's appointment as auditor for both parties occurred on the same date of 5 January 2021, and the letters of appointment issued by both parties share the same reference number. The Election Commission has raised concerns regarding the possibility that the two parties are under the control of the same group of individuals.

Abdul Mabood, the party president of Apna Desh Party in Sultanpur (Uttar Pradesh) was investigated by tax authorities for receiving donations of nearly ₹100 crores and found that his associate Abdul B. Razak Pathan "misused" Mabood's PAN card without his knowledge . Razak established a bank account in Gujarat with the intention of facilitating this fraud.

Jan Raajya Party in Kanpur was investigated and feud between its co-founders Ravi Shankar Yadav and Omendra Bharat was revealed. It was found that Bharat is known to have later joined the Aam Aadmi Party. In November 2016, Arunesh Kumar Singh, the incumbent party president at the time, lodged a First Information Report (FIR) against Yadav, accusing him of engaging in financial misdeeds. The FIR was registered at the Naubasta police station in Kanpur.

Bharatiya Rajnitik Vikalp Party was registered in Bihar's Bakhtiyarpur but all its financial transactions were carried out in Delhi NCR. This political party actively promotes the financial advantages of contributing and donating to its funds by highlighting the income tax exemption benefits associated with such donations. In 2019–20, the political party successfully amassed a substantial sum of ₹25.44 crore.

Tamil Nadu-based political party, Kongunadu Makkal Desia Katchi reported donations amounting to Rs22.64 lakh 2018–19. However, in the subsequent year, its income surged to ₹15.77 crore, primarily due to a donation of ₹15 crore from the Dravida Munnetra Kazhagam (DMK). The party had contested the 2019 Lok Sabha elections in alliance with the DMK. It remains unclear how the smaller party utilized the significant contribution from the DMK, as neither its audit report nor its election expenditure statement for the 2019 Lok Sabha polls were available on the website of the chief electoral officer, Tamil Nadu. While such transactions are not prohibited, it raises questions about whether the DMK donors were aware that a substantial portion of their donation would be further donated to an unrecognized party in the state.

Bhartiya National Janta Dal, a regional political party registered in Gujarat, received a donation of ₹1.47 lakh and ₹1.62 lakh in the fiscal years 2016-17 and 2017–18, respectively. In 2018–19, there was a significant increase in the donation which amounted to ₹4.32 crore. Notably, ₹4.23 crore was reported as being spent on "other charitable objects," without any accompanying details. This lack of transparency raises concerns about the legitimacy and accountability of this party's financial practices.

Rajasthan's Shashakt Bharat Party is headquartered in Chittorgarh. Remarkably, within a year of its establishment in November 2019, the party received substantial sum of over ₹2.67 crore from a diverse pool of 159 donors located throughout the nation. It is worth noting that this period coincided with the onset of the COVID-19 pandemic in India, which undoubtedly presented unique challenges and circumstances. Records shows this Party allocated an amount exceeding ₹1.42 crore towards activities categorized as 'election/general propaganda' and additionally, an expenditure of over ₹97 lakh was dedicated to 'administrative costs'. Further in 2020–21, the Party had tremendously increased its financial resources, accumulating an impressive sum of over ₹6.9 crore. Out of this total, an amount of ₹4.31 crore was allocated towards 'election/general propaganda' activities. It is important to highlight that this financial allocation occurred despite the absence of any elections taking place in Rajasthan during this specific timeframe.

During the Corona Pandemic, the auditor of Garvi Gujarat Party revealed expenditures of an amount exceeding ₹4.0 crore in FY 2019–20. The auditor's report merely mentioned that they did not observe the actual execution of the party's programs or activities. In the year 2022, the income tax department conducted a raid on the premises of the political party's office.

The audit report of the Jan Sangharsh Virat Party indicates that the address in Ahmedabad, whereas the registered office listed on the Election Commission website is situated in Sant Ravidas Ward, Sagar district of Madhya Pradesh. Interestingly, the audit report bears the countersignatures of three individuals who hold the positions of president, secretary, and treasurer. However, the identities of these individuals have not been disclosed. The audited profit and loss account for the FY 2019-20 includes a mention of an indirect income amounting to ₹1.42 crore and indirect expenses totaling ₹1.38 crore, without providing any specific details. This was also during the pandemic period. Based on this information, the Election Commission deduces that the auditor lacks knowledge regarding the sources and destinations of the aforementioned funds.

The Election Commission's initiative to weed out the RUPP ecosystem has brought to light the involvement of numerous fake political parties in the acceptance of fraudulent donations through cheques or banking channels, subsequently returning the funds in cash after deducting their commission and funneling the money through various intermediaries. Primarily, this practice results in a financial loss for the government, as both these parties and their donors can seek exemptions from income tax. Furthermore, apart from the revenue loss, there exists a potential risk of fund diversion and money laundering.

=== Non-Disclosure ===
A significant majority of the RUPPs failed to submit their contribution report for the fiscal year 2019–20, with a staggering 92 per cent of them being non-compliant. In the preceding fiscal year of 2018–19, a total of 199 RUPPs claimed income tax exemptions amounting to ₹445 crore. Subsequently, in the fiscal year 2019–20, 219 RUPPs claimed income tax exemptions worth ₹608 crore. It is worth noting that out of these 219 RUPPs, 66 of them did not fulfill the requirement of submitting their contribution report. Furthermore, for the year 2019, a substantial number of 2,056 RUPPs have yet to file their annual audited accounts. Among the 115 RUPPs located in Assam, Kerala, West Bengal, Tamil Nadu, and Puducherry, which underwent elections in early 2021, only 15 have successfully submitted their election expenditure statement.

=== False Identity ===
Election Commission has initiated a drive in May 2022 to cleanse the political landscape as it was observed that a significant proportion of the RUPPs had exhibited minimal electoral engagement. In the 2019 Lok Sabha elections, a mere 673 parties participated, representing less than 30% of the total RUPPs. Similarly, in the 2022 Uttar Pradesh Legislative Assembly election, only 265 RUPPs out of over 800 registered parties contested in the poll.

The commencement of the clean-up initiative involved the authentication of information furnished by the parties, including their address and particulars of office-bearers, while also considering their electoral engagement or absence thereof. In May 2022, the Election Commission removed 87 non-existent RUPPs from its registry of registered parties, whose addresses were discovered to be fraudulent through either physical verification conducted by the respective chief electoral officers or through reports of undelivered letters or notices from the postal authority.

In June 2022, a total of 111 registered political parties were removed from the list due to their failure to comply with the legal obligation of informing the Election Commission about their authentic communication address. Subsequently, in September 2022, an additional 86 non-existent political parties were delisted by the electoral authority. Furthermore, 253 political parties were declared inactive and subsequently removed from the list as they had not participated in any elections, either at the assembly or Lok Sabha level, during the years 2014 and 2019. These parties also neglected to respond to any correspondence or notices sent to them by the Election Commission. Overall, since May 2022, a total of 537 political parties have been delisted by the Election Commission due to their failure to comply with various legal requirements. Nevertheless, this action primarily signifies that these parties are deprived of obtaining a symbol, thereby rendering them ineligible to participate in elections, a circumstance that a considerable number of them do not engage in regardless. Despite this limitation, these parties persist in their existence and retain the ability to receive funds and enjoy the benefits of income tax exemption. In order to revoke this exemption, an amendment to the Income Tax Act would be necessary.

Another issue of concern relates to the potentiality of these registered political parties assuming the role of "proxies" or "surrogates" for other well established political parties, engaging in informal alliances to acquire illicit funds or the "black money" and restricting the utilization of campaign spaces, names, and symbols.

== Controversies ==
In 2018, the Modi-government with the support of opposition Congress changed the legal provisions which enforced prohibition of foreign funding to Indian political parties. Both parties were found guilty in the Court ruling for violating the norms. From an amendment in the previously existing stricter laws of Foreign Contribution (Regulation) Act, 2010, political parties in India are presently granted immunity from the scrutiny of their historical foreign funding sources. This newfound privilege enables them to accept political contributions from foreign-residing Indians, as well as foreign business entities with their subsidiaries established within India.

== See also ==
- Democracy in India
- Politics of India
- Electoral Bonds
- Corruption in India
