= Scientific rigging =

Term used to refer to electoral malpractice in West Bengal, India

Scientific rigging is a term referring to a number of malpractices used by political parties to win elections. These malpractices may include booth capturing, party cadres impersonating genuine voters, polling agents beaten up threatening voters not to vote for the opposition, etc. These malpractices are generally achieved through blatant use of government power and organization of political parties.

== See also ==
- Electoral fraud
