= Trilochan Sastry =

Indian academic

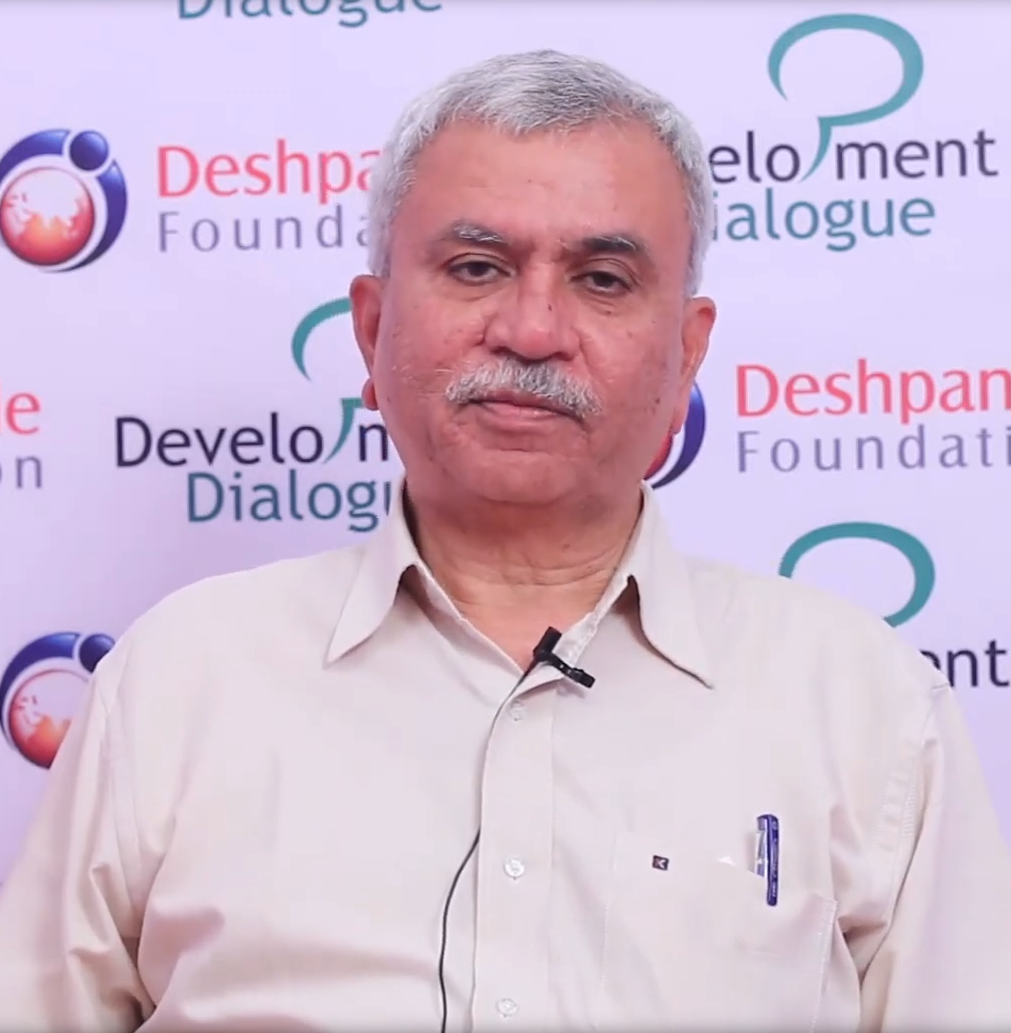

Academic background
- Education: IIT Delhi IIM Ahmedabad Massachusetts Institute of Technology

Trilochan Sastry is the Chairman, Founder Member and Trustee of the Association for Democratic Reforms. He was formerly the Dean at Indian Institute of Management, Bangalore, (from 2008 to 2011), and now, he is a faculty in faculty member in the Decision Sciences Area there. He is also the Founder & Secretary of the Centre for Collective Development (CCD) and the Founder of Farmveda.

== Education ==
He pursued BTech in Electrical Engineering from IIT, Delhi, an MBA from the Indian Institute of Management (IIM), Ahmedabad, and a Ph.D. in Operations Research from Massachusetts Institute of Technology (MIT), USA.

== Academic career ==
Prior to joining IIMB, he was a professor at Indian Institute of Management, Ahmedabad. Prof. Trilochan Sastry is conferred with Satyendra K Dubey Memorial Award from IIT Kanpur (2011–12) for his contributions to bringing about transparency in public life.

Other major positions which he held were:

- Visiting professor, International University of Japan, Niigata, Japan (Spring Term 1996)
- Visiting professor, Hong Kong University of Science and Technology (January 2002 to June 2002)
- Faculty and Associate Dean (Research) and Professor, Indian School of Business, Hyderabad, India (2001 July to 2002 January)
- Visiting Fellow, Massachusetts Institute of Technology (MIT), USA (Summer 1995 and 1997)

His areas of interest include Operations Research, Supply Chain Management, Rural Development, Democracy and Governance.

== Civil Society/Social Work ==
- Chairman, Founder Member and Trustee of Association for Democratic Reforms (ADR): ADR is a non-partisan NGO working on electoral and political reforms. It was founded in 1999 by Prof. Sastry and several professors from IIM – Ahmedabad.
- Founder & Secretary of Centre for Collective Development (CCD): It has been operational since 2004 and as of 2019 had organized over 25000 farmers with a focus on marketing and value addition.
- Founder of Farmveda: They source fresh produce from farmers and use it to create packaged foods, including Ready-to-Cook Mixes, Ready-to-Eat Products, Condiments, Chocolates, Edible Oils, and more. Farmveda shares all the profit among the farmers in the process transforming them as entrepreneurs.

== Other Work Experience ==
- Assistant Executive Engineer, ONGC (1983–85)
- Independent Non-executive Director, NABARD, Mumbai (October 2011-June 2014)

== Book ==
Trilochan Sastry has written a book called "The Essentials of Hinduism: An Introduction to All the Sacred Texts". The book has been published by Penguin Random House India Private Limited. He has been interested in Hinduism since early adolescence and has lived in monasteries, studied the sacred texts, attended classes from various teachers and visited various pilgrimage sites.

== Awards ==
- "Satyendra K Dubey Memorial Award" from IIT Kanpur in 2013 for his contributions to bringing about transparency in public life
- "Distinguished Alumnus" Award from IIT Delhi in 2012
- "Outstanding Contribution to National Development" Award from IIT Delhi Alumni Association in 2005
- "Best Young Teacher" for the year 1999, Association of Indian Management Schools

His work for civil society has been recognized and he has received various awards including the CNN-IBN, NDTV, TOI Indian of the Year.
