= Rajkumar Singh (politician) =

Indian politician

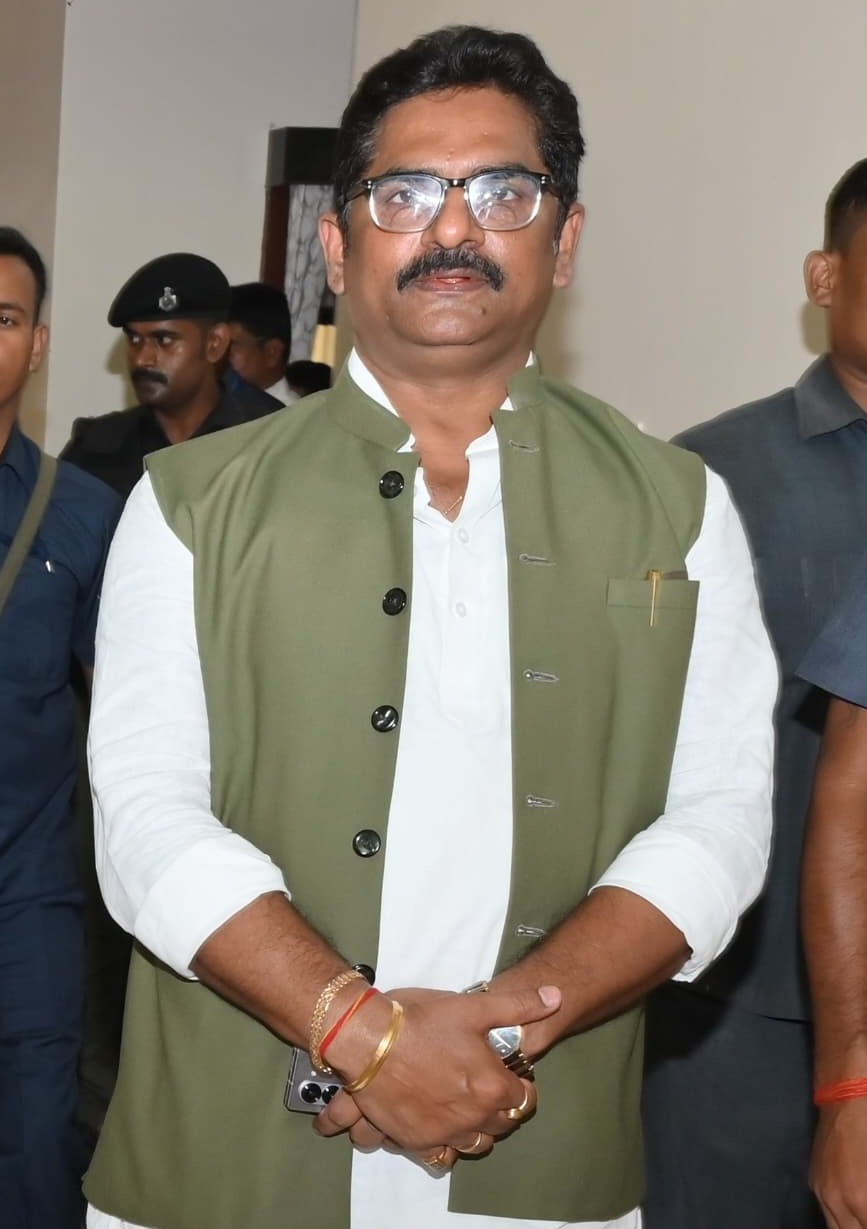

Member of Bihar Legislative Assembly
- In office 10 November 2020 – 9 November 2025
- Preceded by: Narendra Kumar Singh
- Succeeded by: Narendra Kumar Singh
- Constituency: Matihani

Personal details
- Party: Janata Dal (United)
- Other political affiliations: Lok Janshakti Party
- Parent: Kamdev Singh (father)
- Education: Graduate
- Alma mater: Ramjas College
- Profession: Businessman

Rajkumar Singh is an Indian politician from Bihar and a former Member of the Bihar Legislative Assembly. Singh won the Matihani Assembly constituency on Lok Janshakti Party ticket in the 2020 Bihar Legislative Assembly election. He belongs to Bhumihar Brahmin caste, but after few months he switched to Janata Dal (United).

Singh was known in the Begusarai district as a businessman and he had very less interaction with the people of area. Although his family was associated with Indian National Congress and was a well known political family of district, he resided outside the state for most of the time in his youth for education purpose. When he first tried to participate in electoral politics in the year 2020, his acquaintances advised him to contest as a candidate of Indian National Congress. However, Singh was not able to secure his candidature from the Congress. He was, however, invited by Lok Janshakti Party Member of Parliament Surajbhan Singh to contest on the symbol of Lok Janshakti Party. Singh defeated former MLA of Janata Dal (United), Narendra Kumar Singh (Bogo Singh) and was elected to Bihar Legislative Assembly in 2020 for the first time.
