= Electoral bonds =

Mode of political funding in India

Electoral bonds were a mode of funding for political parties in India. It was introduced in 2018 and a public interest litigation was started against it in 2020 by the Association for Democratic Reforms (ADR) and the Communist Party of India (Marxist). The law was struck down as unconstitutional by a five-judge bench of the Supreme Court on 15 February 2024. The State Bank of India was directed to cede the identities and other details of donors and recipients to the Election Commission of India, which was to publish them on its website.

On 7 November 2022, the Electoral Bond scheme was amended to increase the sale days from 70 to 85 in a year where any assembly election may be scheduled. The decision on Electoral Bond (Amendment) Scheme, 2022 was taken shortly prior to the assembly elections in Gujarat and Himachal Pradesh, while the Model Code of Conduct was implemented in both the states.

Ahead of the 2019 General Elections, Congress announced its intention to eliminate electoral bonds, if the party is elected to power. The Communist Party of India (Marxist) has also opposed the scheme, and was the sole national party to refuse donations through electoral bonds.

On 15 February 2024, a five-judge bench of the Supreme Court of India, headed by Chief Justice DY Chandrachud, unanimously struck down the electoral bonds scheme, as well as amendments to the Representation of People Act, Companies Act and Income Tax Act, as unconstitutional. They found it "violative of RTI (Right to Information)" and of voters’ right to information about political funding under Article 19(1)(a) of the Constitution. They also pointed out that it "would lead to quid pro quo arrangements" between corporations and politicians.

The State Bank of India was asked to hand over details of donors and recipients to the Election Commission of India by 6 March, and the ECI was to publish these online by 13 March. However, the SBI failed to submit the details by 6 March, and approached the Supreme Court asking for more time. The court turned down this request, following which the details were turned over to the ECI and published on their website.

== Features ==
Electoral bonds functioned like promissory notes and interest-free banking tools. Any Indian citizen or organization registered in India could buy these bonds after fulfilling the KYC norms laid down by the Reserve Bank of India (RBI). They could be procured by a donor solely through the means of cheque or digital payments in various denominations, such as one thousand, ten thousand, one lakh, ten lakh, and one crore from specific branches of the State Bank of India (SBI). Within a span of 15 days of issuance, these electoral bonds could be redeemed in the designated account of a legally registered political party under the Representation of the People Act, 1951 (u/s 29A) which had received at least 1% of the votes in the last election. The stanches of bonds were available for purchase for 10 days in the months of January, April, July, and October with an additional time-frame of 30 days in the year of general elections for Lok Sabha.

Electoral bonds featured anonymity since they bore no identification of the donor and the political party to which they were issued. In the event that the 15-day deadline was not met, neither the donor nor the receiving political party received a refund for the issued electoral bonds. Rather, the fund value of the electoral bond was remitted to the Prime Minister's National Relief Fund (PMNRF).

== Objective ==
The government capped cash donations to political parties at ₹2,000. Enforcing donation amount exceeding ₹2,000 via the banking system would mean the declaration of assets by political parties and also enable their traceability. Then Finance Minister Arun Jaitley argued that this reform of electoral bonds is expected to enhance transparency and accountability in the realm of political funding, while also preventing the creation of illegal funds for future generations. Jaitley, while defending the anonymity of bonds, argued that if donors were asked to disclose their identity, they would revert back to cash donations. The anonymity of the bonds was also intended to protect the donors' privacy and shield them from potential harassment.

== Impact ==
- The monetary contribution limit that any registered political party in India can receive from an individual has been restricted to ₹2,000 – representing a reduction to 10% of the previous threshold of ₹20,000. This was done through the Finance Act, 2017.
- Introduction of electoral bonds has effectively abolished the ceiling on contributions made by corporations, which was earlier limited to 7.5% of the organization's average net earnings over the preceding three-year period. An amendment to the Companies Act, 2013 ensured this change.
- The scheme resulted in the elimination of the mandatory obligation for individuals or corporations to provide comprehensive information regarding their political contributions. Instead of reporting a comprehensive breakdown of political donations within their annual financial reports, companies would now be solely required to disclose a consolidated sum for purchase of electoral bonds. Relevant provisions under the Income Tax Act, 1961 were amended in this regard.
- The Foreign Contribution Regulation Act (FCRA) was amended by the government, with the support of the opposition, to broaden the definition of a "foreign" entity, with the explicit aim of expanding the scope of firms that could lawfully make political contributions.

Critics argued that these changes would allow any person, corporation, or interest group to now anonymously donate an unrestricted amount of funds to any political party, and that no citizen, journalist, or civil society representative would be able to establish any connections.

== Statistics ==
=== ECI Data ===
On 11 March 2024, the Supreme Court ordered the State Bank of India to disclose the details of electoral bonds to the Election Commission of India (ECI) by the end of business hours the next day. This data was subsequently released by the ECI on their website on 15 March 2024. It includes the details of all bonds encashed between 12 April 2019, and 24 January 2024. On 17 March 2024, the Election Commission unveiled data received directly from political parties and is believed to be from the period before 12 April 2019.

The data released by the ECI showed that the biggest donor was Future Gaming and Hotels Pvt Ltd run by Mr Santiago Martin. This lottery company purchased bonds worth Rs 1,300 crore during the period 2019–2024. Of these, bonds worth Rs 100 crore were purchased seven days after a raid by India's Enforcement Directorate over charges of money laundering. The second and fifth biggest donors - Megha Engineering and Infrastructures Ltd and Vedanta Limited - also faced probes by law enforcement agencies during the period. Meanwhile, the third biggest donor - Qwik Supply Chain - was accused of being a subsidiary of Reliance Industries, a charge Reliance denied. However, the company's registration details indicated a connection.

Amount encashed by political parties since 12 April 2019
	Political Party	Amount (in crores)
1	Bharatiya Janata Party	₹6,060.51
2	All India Trinamool Congress	₹1,609.53
3	Indian National Congress	₹1,421.86
4	Bharat Rashtra Samithi	₹1,214.70
5	Biju Janata Dal	₹775.50
6	Dravida Munnetra Kazhagam	₹639
7	YSR Congress Party	₹337
8	Telugu Desam Party	₹218.88
9	Shiv Sena	₹159.38
10	Rashtriya Janata Dal	₹73.50
11	Aam Aadmi Party	₹65.45
12	Janata Dal (Secular)	₹43.40
13	Sikkim Krantikari Morcha	₹36.50
14	Nationalist Congress Party	₹31
15	Jana Sena Party	₹21
16	Samajwadi Party	₹14.05
17	Janata Dal (United)	₹14
18	Jharkhand Mukti Morcha	₹13.50
19	Shiromani Akali Dal	₹7.2
20	All India Anna Dravida Munnetra Kazhagam	₹6.05
21	Sikkim Democratic Front	₹5.50
22	Maharashtrawadi Gomantak Party	₹0.55
23	Jammu & Kashmir National Conference	₹0.50
24	Goa Forward Party	₹0.35

=== Issues ===
==== 2018 ====
Postponed from January 2018 and commencing on 1 March 2018, the first tranche of electoral bonds were made available for purchase over a span of ten days. State Bank of India issued and encashed these electoral bonds in fours of its branches at Chennai, Delhi, Kolkata and Mumbai.

Analysis of political parties' "Audited Accounts Contribution Statements" for the fiscal year 2017-18 ending on 31 March, which were duly submitted to both the Income Tax Department and the Election Commission of India reveals that BJP obtained electoral bonds amounting to ₹215 crore, whereas the Congress party received only ₹5 crore. It is noteworthy that no other registered political party, national or regional, has reported receiving any form of contribution through electoral bonds.

The third phase of electoral bond sale was scheduled for purchase from 1 May to 10 May at eleven SBI branches in Chennai, Kolkata, Mumbai and New Delhi along with designated branches in Assam, Gujarat, Haryana, Karnataka, Madhya Pradesh, Punjab, Rajasthan and Uttar Pradesh.

An application under the Right to Information (RTI) Act was filed in May 2018 to obtain information on cumulative number of donors and the aggregate quantity of electoral bonds sold by each authorized branch during the months of March and April, among other relevant particulars. The Central Public Information Officer (CPIO) declined the application in June 2018, citing that the compilation of such data would result in "disproportionate diversion of the bank’s resources" but gave only the denomination-wise figures for the sale of all such bonds through the designated branches which did not match with information provided in another application. However, SBI’s first appellate authority (FAA), in July 2018, acknowledged the blunder that the previously given electoral bond sale data — 10 bonds of ₹100,000 denomination, 38 bonds of ₹10,00,000 and 9 bonds of ₹1,00,00,000 denomination, totaling ₹12.93 crore — for the Gandhinagar branch was, in fact, "belonged" to the Bengaluru branch of the State Bank of India. The RTI applicant regretted the claims of transparency made by the government.

==== 2019 ====
The RTI response of SBI to a query by Vihar Durve has shown that the 2019 sale of Electoral Bonds in two tranches of January and March at eleven SBI branches, prior to the Lok Sabha elections in May, has experienced a significant surge amounting to Rs 1,716.05 crore. This figure represents a notable increase of 62.39% in comparison to the total sales of Rs 1,056.73 crore achieved through six tranches conducted in March, April, May, July, October and November of 2018.

==== 2022 ====
From 1 July to 10 July, SBI conducted the 21st phase of Electoral Bond sale.

==== 2023 ====
From 19 January to 28 January, 25th electoral bond sale was carried out while 26th phase of sale worth ₹970.50 crore was conducted from 3 April to 12 April ahead of Karnataka assembly elections on 10 May 2023.

Based on the data obtained through the Right to Information (RTI) by Commodore Lokesh Batra (retired) for the 26th edition of bond sale conducted by the State Bank of India (SBI), it has been revealed that a total of 1,470 bonds were sold. Among these, 923 bonds accounting for 95.10% of the total, were of the denomination of ₹1 crore. Additionally, the SBI sold 468 bonds valued at ₹10 lakh each, 69 bonds valued at ₹1 lakh each, and 10 bonds valued at ₹10,000 each. Highest sales of bonds amounting to ₹335.30 crore was at Hyderabad branch, followed by the Kolkata branch with sales of ₹197.40 crore and the Mumbai branch with sales of ₹169.37 crore. The Chennai branch recorded sales of bonds worth ₹122 crore, while the Bengaluru branch sold bonds worth ₹46 crore. In terms of bond encashment, the New Delhi branch saw redemption of bonds valued at ₹565.79 crore. Subsequently, the Kolkata branch redeemed bonds worth ₹186.95 crore.

27th edition of bond sale was held between 3 July and 12 July which saw 1,371 transactions worth ₹812.80 crore. The Hyderabad branch achieved the highest sales in bonds amounting to ₹266.72 crore, followed by the Kolkata branch with sales worth ₹143.20 crore, and the Mumbai branch with sales worth ₹135 crore. The Bengaluru branch recorded sales of bonds worth ₹46 crore. In terms of bond encashment, the Bhubaneswar branch saw highest redemption of electoral bonds valued at ₹155.50 crore. Subsequently, the New Delhi branch encashed electoral bonds worth ₹117.58 crore.

== Implementation ==
On 28 January 2017, the finance ministry in a correspondence with the Reserve Bank of India (RBI) sought comments on the proposed amendments in The Finance Bill, 2017. The necessity of amendments to RBI Act was realized. Next day, on 30 January 2017, the RBI replied by expressing its severe apprehensions, contending that the electoral bond scheme was susceptible to illicit financial activities, lack of transparency, and possible exploitation. HuffPost India reported that the government overlooked the RBI concerns and went ahead with its announcement during Budget Session in Parliament on 1 February 2017.

The course of action was introduced in The Finance Bill, 2017 during the Union Budget 2017-18 by then Finance Minister Arun Jaitley. They were classified as a Money Bill, (Note: According to the Indian Constitution, Money Bills are legislation that are exempt from the requirement of being "passed" in the Rajya Sabha, as the upper house is only permitted to offer commentary on such bills introduced in Lok Sabha.) and thus bypassed certain parliamentary scrutiny processes, in what was alleged to be a violation of Article 110 of Indian constitution. Jaitley also proposed to amend the Reserve Bank of India (RBI) Act in order to facilitate the issuance of electoral bonds by banks for the purpose of political funding.

Although introduced in early 2017, the Department of Economic Affairs in Ministry Of Finance notified the Electoral Bond Scheme 2018 in a Gazette only on 2 January 2018. According to an estimate, a total of 18,299 electoral bonds equivalent to a monetary value of ₹9,857 crore (98.57 billion) were successfully transacted during the period spanning from March 2018 to April 2022.

=== Data on Funding ===
==== Pre-implementation ====
Previously, it was mandatory for all political parties to report the names and other details of donors who contribute more than ₹20,000 towards the party fund while filing their income-tax returns. Information was not sought for those donating an amount less than ₹20,000. Such donations were declared as Income from "unknown sources" and the details of such donors are not available in the public domain.

Association for Democratic Reforms (ADR) conducted a study in 2017 which found the total income of political parties in India between 2004–05 and 2014-15 was ₹11,367 crore and that 69% of income from donations below ₹20,000 given to political parties amounting to ₹7,833 crore came from unknown sources. Only 16 per cent of their total income was from the known donors.

Bahujan Samaj Party (BSP) declared 100% of its income of ₹111.96 crore in 2014-15 from unknown sources. This was a 2,057% jump from its ₹5.19 crore income in 2004–05. Congress Party had the highest income of ₹3,982 crore among national parties while Bharatiya Janata Party (BJP) reported an income of ₹3,272.63 crore. Approximately 83% of the aggregate income received by the Congress, totaling ₹3,323.39 crore, and 65% of the total income acquired by the BJP, amounting to ₹2,125.91 crore was attributed to unknown sources. The CPI(M) declared ₹893 crore as its income, which was third highest in 2014–15.

Samajwadi Party had the highest income of ₹819.1 crore among regional political parties while Dravida Munnetra Kazhagam (DMK) reported second highest income of ₹203.02 crore followed by All India Anna Dravida Munnetra Kazhagam (AIADMK) with third highest net revenue of ₹165.01 crore. ADR study showed 94% of Samajwadi Party income (₹766.27 crore) was from unknown sources whereas Shiromani Akali Dal (SAD) reported 86% (₹88.06 crore) of revenue from unknown sources.

==== Post-implementation ====
In 2018, the 133-year old Indian National Congress which ruled for 49 years of Independent India's 71 years history, for the first time made a public request for "small contribution" to its party fund which pointed to shortfall in party's income. It is impossible to determine the exact amount of money that political parties earn or possess. The appeal by Congress was seen as a move to portray itself as an honest party that is not getting enough funding from corporate companies and wealthy donors. The Congress-led UPA government faced allegations of involvement in major scandals during its previous tenure. While the INC saw dip in their revenues, BJP had seen doubling of its earning in the same period.

For the Financial Year 2021–22, ADR Annual Audit report revealed that the regional parties declared ₹887.55 crore as income from unknown sources which amounts to 75% of their net income. Only 12% (₹145.42 crore) of the total income (₹1165.576 crore) of the 27 regional parties was attributed to known sources. Electoral bonds contributed to 93.26% (₹827.76 crore) of the entire income from unknown sources. Also, ₹38.354 crore (4.32%) was garnered from sale of coupons while ₹21.293 crore (2.4%) was received by the regional parties in form of donations each amounting to less than ₹20,000. According the information given by 27 out of 54 recognized regional parties to Election Commission of India by May 2023, DMK received 96.01% (₹306.025 crore) of its total income (₹318.745 crore) from unknown sources.

Top 10 Regional Parties Income (₹) in FY 2021-22
Party	Total Income	Unknown Sources	% Unknown Sources
Dravida Munnetra Kazhagam	318.745 crore	306.025 crore	96%
Biju Janata Dal	307.288 crore	291.096 crore	95%
Bharat Rashtra Samithi	218.112 crore	153.037 crore	70%
YSR Congress Party	93.724 crore	60.0168 crore	64%
Janata Dal (United)	86.555 crore	48.3617 crore	56%
Samajwadi Party	61.011 crore	3.66 crore	6%
Shiromani Akali Dal	25.414 crore	12.1987 crore	48%
All India Anna Dravida Munnetra Kazhagam	25.263 crore	nil	0%
Maharashtra Navnirman Sena	6.7683 crore	5.0762 crore	75%
Telugu Desam Party	6.028 crore	3.667 crore	61%

== Public interest litigation ==
The electoral bonds scheme has been subjected to legal challenge through a Public Interest Litigation (PIL) in the Supreme Court of India on two grounds. Firstly, it is argued that the scheme has resulted in a complete lack of transparency in political funding in India, thereby preventing the Election Commission and the citizens of the country from accessing crucial information regarding political contributions and parties' significant source of income. Secondly, it is contended that the passage of this scheme as a Money Bill, thereby circumventing the upper house of Parliament — Rajya Sabha, is unconstitutional and infringes upon the doctrine of separation of powers and the citizen's fundamental right to information, both of which form integral components of the basic structure of the Constitution. The PIL was initiated in October 2017, with the Ministry of Finance submitting its response in January 2018 and the Law Ministry responding in March 2018.

The Supreme Court considered a collection of petitions submitted by the non-governmental organization Association for Democratic Reforms, Common Cause (India), (represented by Prashant Bhushan) and the Communist Party of India (Marxist), which contest the legality of the modifications made to the Reserve Bank of India Act, the Representation of the People Act, the Income Tax Act, the Companies Act, and the Foreign Contribution Regulation Act through the Finance Acts of 2016 and 2017. These amendments enabled the utilization of electoral bonds.

In his petition against the government's decision, CPI(M) leader Sitaram Yechury demanded for revocation of Electoral Bond Scheme and the called the issuance of electoral bonds and the Finance Act 2017, as "arbitrary" and "discriminatory". The government in its defense of its decision to introduce electoral bonds, asserted in Supreme Court that its primary objective was to ensure increased accountability and promote electoral reforms as a means to combat the escalating threat of "black money" and to help nation's transitions towards a cashless and digital economy. Government said that the implementation of a restricted time-frame and a significantly brief period of maturity for electoral bonds reduces the likelihood of any potential misuse. The acquisition of these bonds by donors will be duly recorded in their financial statements, thereby reflecting the donations made. Further, government added that the introduction of electoral bonds will encourage donors to opt for the banking channel as a means of contributing, with their personal information being captured by the authorized issuing entity. Consequently, this measure will guarantee transparency, accountability, and serve as a significant stride towards electoral reform.

The government requested the dismissal of the petition submitted by the left party, asserting that there is an absence of "invidious or arbitrary discrimination" and no infringement upon any fundamental rights of the Petitioner.

The Election Commission of India submitted its views on the matter to the Supreme Court that the amendments in existing legislation, which permit the utilization of electoral bonds and eliminate the restriction on donations, including those from foreign origins, to political parties, would inevitably result in a surge in the utilization of illicit funds (black money) during the electoral process. Furthermore, this alteration would have profound consequences on the transparency of financial contributions to political parties, ultimately leading to the manipulation of Indian policies.

== Criticism ==
The Constitution of India clearly specifies the conditions for a legislation under consideration to be classified as a Money Bill. The provisions pertaining to electoral bonds fail to satisfy the criteria for classification as a Money Bill. The government's justification for this is that any component of the Budget, being a Money Bill, automatically fulfills the prerequisites for classification as such. A comparable instance of the misuse of the Money Bill was seen previous to the retrospective amendments made to the Foreign Currency Regulation Act (FCRA) by the government, on two separate occasions, in an effort to shield the BJP and the Congress from prosecution for FCRA violations, as determined by the Delhi High Court. The UPA-administration had earlier implemented "Electoral Trusts" with false narratives on better electoral fundings.

All political parties have a tendency to possess a vested interest in maintaining the anonymity of fund origins due to the predominant presence of unreported funds. These parties not only tolerate the existence of illicit funds in the form of "black money" but also safeguard their sources and actively engage in their utilization. Regrettably, comprehensive documentation in regard to the allocation of these funds does not exist as it is not mandated by any of the existing laws. Consequently, electoral finances and expenditures emerge as the principal catalysts for corruption and the proliferation of unaccounted funds, hence the black money is widely prevalent in Indian politics.

While the Modi-administration has taken steps to address the issue of political funding by imposing restrictions on cash donations and introducing "election bonds", some politicians and election officials believe that these measures will not have a significant impact. It is said that the upcoming elections will not be directly affected by these changes, but the government is likely to view them as an opportunity for Narendra Modi to enhance his reputation as a fighter against corruption. This comes after he announced several measures to address illegal wealth.

It is difficult to fully understand the financial aspects of politics in the world's largest democracy due to the lack of transparency in campaign financing. The introduction of Electoral Bonds has enabled companies to anonymously finance political parties without any limitations on the amount of donations. This development has been criticized by activists who argue that it grants corporations excessive influence and obfuscates the connections between politicians and business entities. The initial issuance of electoral bonds saw the BJP acquire approximately 95 percent of the total bonds, as per information obtained by Reuters through a Right to Information request and BJP submissions.

The purpose of introducing the bonds was to expose illegal money and increase transparency in political funding. However, critics argue that it has had the opposite effect, as they claim the bonds are shrouded in secrecy. There exists an absence of publicly available documentation regarding the purchasers of individual bonds and the recipients of the corresponding donations. This lack of transparency renders the bonds susceptible to being deemed "unconstitutional and problematic," as it hinders taxpayers and citizens from obtaining knowledge about the origins of these contributions. Moreover, according to some critics, it is argued that the anonymity of the bonds is not absolute since SBI, the state-owned bank maintains a comprehensive record of both the benefactor and the beneficiary. Consequently, this enables the ruling government to effortlessly obtain pertinent information and potentially exploit it in order to exert influence over donors. This practice has been deemed as conferring an unjust advantage upon the ruling party and the government.

In 2017, upon the initial announcement of the bonds, the Election Commission of India expressed concerns regarding the potential compromise of electoral transparency. This apprehension was echoed by various entities including the central bank, the law ministry, and several Members of Parliament, who contended that the electoral bonds would not effectively deter the influx of illicit funds into the political sphere. Notably, the ECI later altered its stance and extended support to the electoral bonds after a year. Furthermore, the courts have postponed their verdict on the matter, thus leaving it unresolved. Those who oppose this scheme argue that the government has effectively enacted opacity through the implementation of electoral bonds.

There can be a possibility of shell companies' accounts to serve as a means to facilitate contributions for favorable political parties. Opponents highlight that there exists a potential scenario wherein benefactors may procure bonds using funds acquired through legitimate means or subjected to taxation, and subsequently vend them to a third party utilizing illicitly obtained or undeclared funds for tax purposes. The third party may then transfer the bonds to a political organization. A major issue with political financing in India is the anonymity of funding sources. Since the ₹2,000 limit still exist for donations in cash, there is an apprehension that political parties will hide a large portion of their illegal money in this category.

The potential consequences of a political party in possession of both Electoral Bonds funds and the Aadhaar and Jan Dhan account numbers of voters are significant. The party could potentially engage in a "Direct Benefit Transfer" of funds into the accounts of voters in advance of an election. The pathway from Electoral Bonds to Aadhaar and bank account numbers, or even just UPI numbers, presents a potential conduit for untraceable funds from anonymous sources to anonymous voters. This development could ultimately undermine the integrity of democratic elections, rendering them neither "free" nor "fair."

Retired Chief Election Commissioner V. S. Sampath said the Election Commission can't do much in situations where legislative modifications are tailored to accommodate the interests of corporate benefactors and political organizations that receive financial contributions from businesses including foreign entities.

== Controversies ==
In 2023, former CM Chandrababu Naidu was arrested and the Andhra Pradesh Criminal Investigation Department (CID) had submitted evidence to the Anti Corruption Bureau (ACB) Court, indicating that the Telugu Desam Party (TDP) received ₹27 crore in the form of electoral bonds as donations during the fiscal year 2018-19. This substantial amount allegedly serves as proof of the funds that were misappropriated in a skill development project. Calling this a political hunt and misuse of state police machinery, the TDP countered that ruling YSR Congress Party (YSRCP) led by Chief Minister Y. S. Jagan Mohan Reddy had obtained a total of ₹99.84 crore in electoral bonds during the fiscal year 2018-19, ₹74.35 crore in 2019-20, ₹96.25 crore in 2020-21, and ₹60 crore in 2021-22 but the YSRCP refrained from disclosing this information in its publication, Saakshi, indicating a lack of transparency and accountability.

== See also ==
- Electoral reform in India
- Political funding in India
