= Ajit Ranade =

Indian economist

- Occupations: Economist, Political analyst, Reporter
- Employer: Aditya Birla Group (Chief Economist)

Academic background
- Education: IIT Bombay (B.Tech.); IIM Ahmedabad (M.B.A); Brown University (PhD)

Academic work
- Institutions: Gokhale Institute of Politics and Economics; Indira Gandhi Institute of Development Research
- Notable works: Life Insurance in India: Emerging Issues; Three Questions about Insurance Liberalisation; Maharashtra's EGS: Regional Patterns, Scope for Reforms and Replication

Ajit Ranade (born 24 April 1961) is an Indian economist, political analyst, and reporter based out of Pune, India. He served as Vice Chancellor of Gokhale Institute of Politics and Economics from October 2021 to October 2024. His tenure ended following the findings of a Fact-Finding Committee constituted by the university that found irregularities in his appointment as it did not conform to the prescribed UGC norms

== Education ==
He is a PhD in economics from Brown University. He is a B.Tech. in Electrical Engineering from Indian Institute of Technology, Bombay. He is an alumnus of Indian Institute of Management, Ahmedabad. He had been Professor ICRIER, New Delhi and assistant professor at IGIDR, Mumbai.

== Professional career ==
He served as chief economist of the Aditya Birla Group an Indian multinational conglomerate. for many years before retiring and pursuing his academic and other interests. Later he also worked as Vice Chancellor of Gokhale Institute of Politics and Economics which is left in 2024. He also served as chief economist at ABN AMRO Bank. He serves as a director on the board of Hindalco Almex Aerospace Limited, a joint venture company of Hindalco and Almex Inc. of US between 2007 and 2011. He was Government of India's nominee as independent director of Multi Commodity Exchange of India Ltd., from 22 September 2007 to 1 April 2010. He has served on various committees of the Reserve Bank of India, including the Committee on Fuller Capital Account Convertibility and the committee to review FEMA for Individuals. He is a member of the National Executive Committee of FICCI and Economic Policy Council of CII. He chairs the Research Advisory Panel of the Indian Institute of Banking and Finance. He is a member of the board of governors of the Indian Institute of Technology, Bombay. He is columnist with Mumbai Mirror He also writes at FirstPost, Business Standard, IBNLive, The Economics Times. He has authored several books, namely Life Insurance in India: Emerging Issues, Three Questions about Insurance Liberalisation, Maharashtra's EGS: Regional Patterns, Scope for Reforms and Replication. He is a co founder and trustee of Association for Democratic Reforms which is an Indian civil society group vying for transparency in the politics of India. He was awarded as Distinguished Alumnus of Indian Institute of Technology, Bombay in 2009. He also serves as Independent Director for Persistent Systems.
