= Booth capturing =

Electoral fraud

Booth capturing, or booth looting, is electoral fraud in which party loyalists or hired criminals "capture" a polling booth and vote in place of legitimate voters to ensure that a particular candidate wins. It is a form of voter suppression.

== India ==
It is a general rule in Indian elections that agents of every contesting candidates need to be present at the booth. However, they are in many areas threatened or assaulted and so leave the polling premises. The Election Commission of India has a general abbreviation that a section or half of one of Central Para Military Forces is enough to prevent incidents.

The first instance of booth capturing in India was recorded in the 1957 General Elections in Rachiyahi, in Begusarai District's Matihani assembly seat. The word came into prominent use in the media during the late 1970s and 1980s when the number of parties and candidates multiplied. This resulted in some Parties using underhand methods including booth capturing, especially in the rural India.

In 1989 the Representation of the People Act, 1951 was modified to include booth capturing as an offense punishable by law and countermanding or adjourning any poll that was booth captured. The development of the Electronic Voting Machine (EVM) was also intended to make it harder for booth capturers to stuff the ballot boxes with their votes by enabling a five-minute delay between each vote entered as against hundreds of votes in the same time using ballot papers (stamped by a group of 3–4). The EVMs also possess a "close" button which can be used by the polling officer to deactivate the machines. Despite this, booth capturing continues to happen, albeit at a much reduced rate.

== Nepal ==
Booth capturing was prevalent in the 1st Nepalese Constituent Assembly. Another election was required in 106 polling stations because of electoral fraud, which included booth capturing. Political parties have accused each other of booth capturing and demanded another election as recently as 2017.

== See also ==
- Corruption in India
- Electoral reform in India

== Bibliography ==
- Nedumpara, Jose J. (2004). Political Economy and Class Contradictions: A Study. Anmol Publications. ISBN 978-81-261-1718-5.
- Omvedt, Gail (2021). Reinventing Revolution. doi:10.4324/9781315088952. ISBN 978-1-315-08895-2.
- Shakdher, S. L. (1992). The Law and Practice of Elections in India. National Publishing House. ISBN 978-81-214-0461-7.
- Singh, Bhim (2002). Murder of Democracy in Jammu and Kashmir. Har-Anand Publications. ISBN 978-81-241-0864-2.
