= 1957 Indian general election =

- 24 February – 14 March 1957

494 of the 505 seats in the Lok Sabha (Note: Eleven members were appointed, including six representing Jammu and Kashmir, two representing Anglo-Indians, one representing Part B Tribal Areas in Assam, one representing the Amindive, Laccadive and Minicoy Islands and one representing the Andaman and Nicobar Islands.) 248 seats needed for a majority
- Registered: 193,652,179
- Turnout: 45.44% (▲0.57pp)
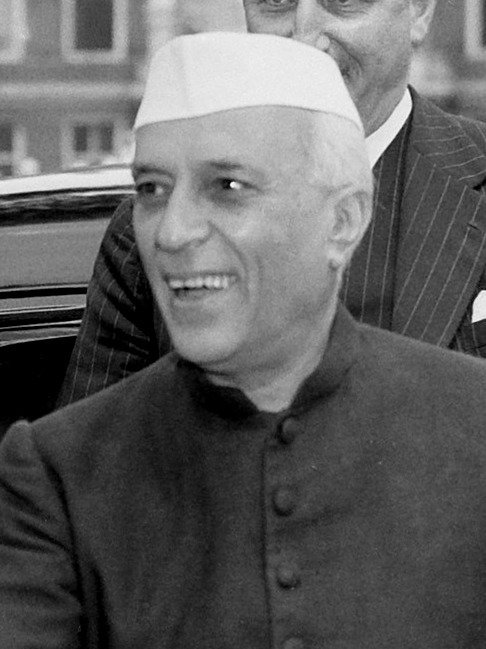

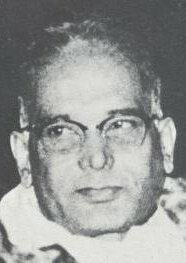
	First party	Second party
		CPI
Leader	Jawaharlal Nehru	Ajoy Ghosh
Party	INC	CPI
Last election	44.99%, 364 seats	3.29%, 16 seats
Seats won	371	27
Seat change	▲7	▲11
Popular vote	57,579,589	10,754,075
Percentage	47.78%	8.92%
Swing	▲2.79pp	▲5.63pp
	Third party	Fourth party
		ABJ
Leader	Jayaprakash Narayan	Debaprasad Ghosh
Party	PSP	ABJS
Last election	New	3.06%, 3 seats
Seats won	19	4
Seat change	New	▲1
Popular vote	12,542,666	7,193,267
Percentage	10.41%	5.97%
Swing	New	▲2.91pp
- Results by constituency
Prime Minister before election
Jawaharlal Nehru
INC
Prime Minister after election
Jawaharlal Nehru
INC

General elections were held in India between 24 February and 14 March 1957, the second elections to the Lok Sabha after independence. Elections to several state legislatures were held simultaneously.

Under the leadership of Jawaharlal Nehru, the Indian National Congress easily won a second term in power, taking 371 of the 494 seats. They gained an extra seven seats (the size of the Lok Sabha had been increased by five) and their vote share increased from 45% to 48%. The INC received nearly five times more votes than the Communist Party, the second largest party. In addition, 19% of the vote and 42 seats went to independent candidates, the highest of any Indian general election.

== Electoral system ==
There were 494 seats elected using first past the post voting. Out of the 403 constituencies, 91 elected two members, while the remaining 312 elected a single member. The multi-seat constituencies were abolished before the next election.

The elections were overseen by Sukumar Sen, the Chief Election Commissioner, who used the existing election infrastructure to reduce costs and improve efficiency. Historian Ramachandra Guha wrote "this general election cost the exchequer Rs45 million less than the previous one. The prudent Sen had safely stored the 3.5 million ballot boxes the first time round and only half a million additional ones were required."

== Conduct ==
The first instance of booth capturing in India was recorded in 1957 in the General Elections of that year in Rachiyahi, in Begusarai's Matihani assembly seat.

== Results ==
Party	Votes	%	Seats	+/–
Indian National Congress	57,579,589	47.78	371	+7
Praja Socialist Party	12,542,666	10.41	19	–2
Communist Party of India	10,754,075	8.92	27	+11
Bharatiya Jana Sangh	7,193,267	5.97	4	+1
Scheduled Castes Federation	2,038,890	1.69	6	+4
All India Ganatantra Parishad	1,291,141	1.07	7	+1
People's Democratic Front	1,044,032	0.87	2	–5
Hindu Mahasabha	1,032,322	0.86	1	–3
Peasants and Workers Party of India	924,832	0.77	4	+2
Jharkhand Party	751,830	0.62	6	+3
Forward Bloc (Marxist)	665,341	0.55	2	+1
Chota Nagpur Santhal Parganas Janata Party	501,359	0.42	3	+2
Akhil Bharatiya Ram Rajya Parishad	460,838	0.38	0	–3
Revolutionary Socialist Party	308,742	0.26	0	–3
Praja Party	140,742	0.12	0	0
Independents	23,284,249	19.32	42	+5
Appointed members (Note: Six representing Jammu and Kashmir, two representing Anglo-Indians, one representing Part B Tribal Areas in Assam, one representing the Amindive, Laccadive and Minicoy Islands and one representing the Andaman and Nicobar Islands.)			11	+1
Total	120,513,915	100.00	505	+6
Registered voters/turnout	193,652,179	45.44		
Source: ECI

=== Results by state ===
State	Total seats	Seats won									
State	Total seats	INC	CPI	PSP	GP	SCF	JKP	BJS	Others	Ind.	App.
Andaman and Nicobar Islands	1										1
Andhra Pradesh	43	37	2						2	2	
Assam	12	9		2						1	
Bihar	53	41		2			6		3	1	
Bombay	66	38	4	5		5		2	4	8	
Delhi	5	5									
Himachal Pradesh	4	4									
Kerala	18	6	9	1						2	
Jammu and Kashmir	6										6
Laccadive, Minicoy, and Amindivi Islands	1										1
Madhya Pradesh	36	35							1		
Madras	41	31	2							8	
Manipur	2	1								1	
Mysore	26	23		1		1				1	
North-East Frontier Agency	1										1
Orissa	20	7	1	2	7					3	
Punjab	22	21	1								
Rajasthan	22	19								3	
Tripura	2	1	1								
Uttar Pradesh	86	70	1	4				2		9	
West Bengal	36	23	6	2					2	3	
Anglo-Indians	2										2
Total	505	371	27	19	7	6	6	4	12	42	11
Source: ECI

==== Andhra Pradesh ====
Party	Votes	%	Seats	+/–
Indian National Congress	4,906,044	51.47	37	+31
Communist Party of India	1,144,811	12.01	2	–4
People's Democratic Front	1,044,032	10.95	2	–
Other parties	600,686	6.30	0	–
Independents	1,835,800	19.26	2	–6
Total	9,531,373	100.00	43	–

==== Assam ====
Party	Votes	%	+/–	Seats	+/–
Indian National Congress	1,184,708	51.68	+5.94	9	–2
Praja Socialist Party	457,643	19.96	–9.23	2	+1
Communist Party of India	235,044	10.25	New	0	New
Independents	415,217	18.11	+4.37	1	+1
Total	2,292,612	100.00	–	12	0

==== Bihar ====
Party	Votes	%	+/–	Seats	+/–
Indian National Congress	4,450,208	44.47	–1.30	41	–4
Jharkhand Party	751,830	7.51	+0.10	6	+3
Chota Nagpur Santhal Parganas Janata Party	501,359	5.01	+2.65	3	+2
Praja Socialist Party	2,165,462	21.64	–2.83	2	–1
Communist Party of India	502,707	5.02	+4.62	0	0
Other parties	51,416	0.51	–6.00	0	–2
Independents	1,584,894	15.84	+2.76	1	0
Total	10,007,876	100.00	–	53	–2

==== Bombay ====
Party	Votes	%	+/–	Seats	+/–
Indian National Congress	8,156,272	48.66	–1.49	38	–2
Praja Socialist Party	1,457,203	8.69	–11.45	5	+5
Scheduled Caste Federation	1,354,475	8.08	+3.65	5	+4
Communist Party of India	1,055,013	6.29	+4.95	4	+4
Peasants and Workers Party of India	924,832	5.52	–1.48	4	+3
Bharatiya Jana Sangh	566,008	3.38	New	2	New
Other parties	136,749	0.82	–4.14	0	0
Independents	3,109,733	18.55	+6.58	8	+5
Total	16,760,285	100.00	–	66	+21

==== Kerala ====
Party	Votes	%	Seats
Communist Party of India	2,267,888	37.48	9
Indian National Congress	2,102,883	34.76	6
Praja Socialist Party	438,459	7.25	1
Revolutionary Socialist Party	308,742	5.10	0
Independents	932,274	15.41	2
Total	6,050,246	100.00	18

==== Madhya Pradesh ====
Party	Votes	%	+/–	Seats	+/–
Indian National Congress	3,967,199	52.10	+0.47	35	+8
Hindu Mahasabha	373,503	4.91	+4.60	1	+1
Praja Socialist Party	1,225,735	16.10	–2.38	0	0
Bharatiya Jana Sangh	1,062,936	13.96	+9.02	0	0
Other parties	376,441	4.94	–7.77	0	0
Independents	608,408	7.99	–3.94	0	–2
Total	7,614,222	100.00	–	36	+7

==== Madras ====
Party	Votes	%	+/–	Seats	+/–
Indian National Congress	5,094,552	46.52	+10.13	31	+7
Communist Party of India	1,101,338	10.06	+1.11	2	–1
Praja Socialist Party	399,789	3.65	–11.43	0	+0
Independents	4,355,162	39.77	+16.62	8	+8
Total	10,950,841	100.00	–	41	–34

==== Mysore ====
Party	Votes	%	+/–	Seats	+/–
Indian National Congress	3,219,014	55.52	–13.42	23	+13
Praja Socialist Party	1,082,698	18.67	–10.79	1	0
Scheduled Caste Federation	115,214	1.99	New	1	New
Other parties	228,979	3.95		0	0
Independents	1,152,535	19.88	+9.52	1	+1
Total	5,798,440	100.00	–	26	+15

==== Orissa ====
Party	Votes	%	+/–	Seats	+/–
Indian National Congress	1,776,767	40.01	–2.50	7	–4
All India Ganatantra Parishad	1,291,141	29.08	+2.85	7	+1
Praja Socialist Party	684,023	15.40	–1.44	2	+1
Communist Party of India	214,903	4.84	–0.93	1	0
Independents	473,656	10.67	+2.02	3	+2
Total	4,440,490	100.00	–	20	0

==== Punjab ====
Party	Votes	%	+/–	Seats	+/–
Indian National Congress	3,682,219	51.26	+8.50	21	+5
Communist Party of India	1,207,600	16.81	+11.77	1	+1
Bharatiya Jana Sangh	1,152,672	16.05	+10.45	0	0
Other parties	333,630	4.64	–23.32	0	–2
Independents	807,709	11.24	–7.40	0	0
Total	7,183,830	100.00	–	22	+4

==== Rajasthan ====
Party	Votes	%	+/–	Seats	+/–
Indian National Congress	2,494,094	53.65	+12.23	19	+10
Bharatiya Jana Sangh	518,355	11.15	+8.11	0	–1
Other parties	356,278	7.66	–18.72	0	–4
Independents	1,280,356	27.54	–1.62	3	–3
Total	4,649,083	100.00	–	22	+2

==== Uttar Pradesh ====
Party	Votes	%	+/–	Seats	+/–
Indian National Congress	10,599,639	46.29	–6.70	70	–11
Praja Socialist Party	3,511,157	15.34	–2.50	4	+2
Bharatiya Jana Sangh	3,385,247	14.79	+7.50	2	+2
Communist Party of India	383,509	1.67	+1.32	1	+1
Akhil Bharatiya Ram Rajya Parishad	98,138	0.43	–3.12	0	0
Independents	4,918,413	21.48	+10.14	9	+7
Total	22,896,103	100.00	–	86	0

==== West Bengal ====
Party	Votes	%	+/–	Seats	+/–
Indian National Congress	5,031,696	48.20	+6.10	23	–1
Communist Party of India	1,985,181	19.01	+9.55	6	+1
Marxist Forward Bloc	665,341	6.37	+1.85	2	+2
Praja Socialist Party	590,692	5.66	–5.26	2	+2
Hindu Mahasabha	561,741	5.38	+1.11	0	–1
Bharatiya Jana Sangh	149,351	1.43	–4.51	0	–2
Independents	1,456,098	13.95	–4.51	3	+3
Total	10,440,100	100.00	–	36	+2

=== Women performance in elections ===
Based on the published data from the Election Commission of India (ECI) website.

==== Participation ====
State/UT	Total seats	Women contestants		Elected	Women contestants (%)	Elected (%)
State/UT	Total seats	Women	Seats	Elected	Women contestants (%)	Elected (%)
Andhra Pradesh	43	4	3	3	3.5%	6.9%
Assam	12	2	2	2	6.5%	14.3%
Bihar	53	7	7	5	3.7%	9.4%
Bombay	66	5	5	3	3.11%	4.5%
Kerala	18	1	1	0	1.7%	0
Madhya Pradesh	36	8	6	3	6.6%	8.3%
Madras	41	2	2	1	3.2%	2.4%
Mysore	26	0	0	0	0	0
Manipur	2	0	0	0	0	0
Orissa	20	0	0	0	0	0
Punjab	22	1	1	1	1.3%	4.5%
Rajasthan	22	0	0	0	0	0
Tripura	1	0	0	0	0	0
Uttar Pradesh	86	6	4	1	2.05%	13.75%
West Bengal	36	5	4	2	11.59%	1.1%
Delhi	5	4	2	1	14.8%	20%
Himachal Pradesh	4	0	0	0	0	0
India	494	45	37	22	2.96%	4.45%

== See also ==
- List of members of the 2nd Lok Sabha
- Election Commission of India
- Booth capturing
- 1957 Indian general election by state or union territory
