= Association for Democratic Reforms =

Indian electoral reform advocacy group

Association for Democratic Reforms (ADR)
- Abbreviation: ADR
- Formation: 1999; 27 years ago
- Founder: Trilochan Sastry; Jagdeep Chhokar; Dr. Ajit Ranade and others
- Type: NGO
- Headquarters: Plot No. E-5, 4th Floor, Lane-1, Westend Marg, Saidulajab, (Behind Saket Metro Gate No. 2), New Delhi-110 030
- Location: New Delhi
- Region served: India
- Key people: Trilochan Sastry; Jagdeep Chhokar; Dr. Ajit Ranade
- Volunteers: 1200 NGOs
- Website: adrindia.org, myneta.info

Association for Democratic Reforms (ADR) is an apolitical, non-partisan nonprofit organisation registered in India, working on electoral and political reforms for over 25 years.

== History ==
ADR came into existence in 1999 when a group of Professors from the Indian Institute of Management (IIM) Ahmedabad filed a Public Interest Litigation (PIL) with the Delhi High Court regarding the disclosure of the criminal, financial, and educational background of the candidates contesting elections. The PIL was upheld by the Delhi High Court in 2000, but the Government of India appealed to the Supreme Court of India against the High Court judgment. However, in 2002 and subsequently in 2003, the Supreme Court made it mandatory for all the candidates contesting elections to disclose their criminal, financial, and educational background prior to the polls by filing an affidavit with the Election Commission of India.

=== Founders ===
ADR was co-founded by Trilochan Sastry, Jagdeep S. Chhokar, Ajit Ranade, and others. It is headed by Maj. Gen. Anil Verma (Retd.). Mr. Jaskirat Singh Vipul Mudgal and others are the trustees.

== Objective ==
The objective of ADR is to improve governance and strengthen democracy through continuous work in the area of Electoral and Political Reforms. They focus on:

- Advocating against corruption and criminalisation in the Political Process

- Empowerment of the electorate through greater dissemination of information relating to the candidates and the parties, for a better and informed choice

- Need for greater accountability of Indian Political Parties

- Need for inner-party democracy and transparency in party-functioning

== Function and research areas ==
Election Watch: Election Watch is the flagship program of ADR. Since 2002, National Election Watch (NEW) and ADR have been conducting Election Watches across the country. As part of this program, affidavits of candidates contesting elections are minutely examined and citizens are provided with information about their background details to help them make an informed choice. The Election Watch has so far collated data of about 1,82,108 candidates.

Election Expenses of MPs and MLAs: ADR analyses the election expenses declared by elected representatives and the data is released to the media/citizens.

Register of Members' Interest of Rajya Sabha: ADR also analyses the Register of Members' Interest of the Rajya Sabha, which was brought into the public domain in June 2011 after ADR's two-year-long RTI battle. The report contains information regarding remunerative directorship, shareholding of controlling nature, regular remunerative activity, paid consultancy, and professional engagement of the Rajya Sabha members.

Political Party Watch (PPW): ADR's PPW program is aimed at bringing more transparency and accountability to the functioning of political parties. In 2008, based on an appeal filed by ADR, the Central Information Commission (CIC) declared that the Income Tax Returns of political parties should be made available in the public domain by the IT Department.

ADR has analyzed the IT returns of all National and Regional parties of India whose ITR details are available in the public domain, from FY 2002-03 till date. An analysis of their Income Tax returns and donations statements filed with the Election Commission of India (ECI) shows that the sources remain largely unknown. ADR analyses the sources of funding of National and Regional political parties. Between FY 2004-05 and FY 2014–15, ADR analyzed sources of funding for 6 National and 51 Regional political parties.

Contribution Reports of Political Parties: Under this program, the contributions reports of political parties containing information about the receipt of donations by corporate houses and individuals above Rs 20,000, are analyzed.

Contribution Reports of Electoral Trusts: Apart from individuals and companies, there are electoral trusts which contribute the most to National parties and a few Regional parties. The details of contributions received by the Electoral Trusts and the details of donations given by the Trust to political parties are analyzed for the period between FY 2013–14 to FY 2017–18.

Election Expenditure of Political Parties: expenditure declared by various political parties after Lok Sabha and Assembly Elections. Till date, expenditure reports for 91 Assembly Elections and three Lok Sabha Elections have been analyzed.

Legal Advocacy: Resorts to legal advocacy for political and electoral reforms. From time to time, ADR takes up various issues in the light of good governance by filing relevant complaints/appeals and PILs/writs with Central Information Commission, Supreme Court/ High Court as well as other Central and State agencies. ADR also attends various consultations/round-tables with bodies like the Law Commission of India, Election Commission of India, Lok Sabha, and Rajya Sabha Secretariat.

== Achievements ==
- May 2002 and March 2003: ADR's petitions resulted in a landmark judgment by the Supreme Court of India by making it mandatory for the candidates contesting elections to Parliament and State Assemblies to file self-sworn affidavits (Form 26) declaring full information regarding their criminal, financial and educational background.
- April 2008: ADR obtained a landmark ruling from the Central Information Commission (CIC) stating that Income Tax Returns of Political Parties would now be available in the public domain along with the assessment orders.
- June 2011: After a two-year-long RTI battle, crucial information on the 'Registers of Members' Interest' was finally mandated by CIC to be available in the public domain in June 2011. The Second report of the 'Committee on Ethics' of the Lok Sabha mentions ADR's recommendations to instate a Register of Members' Interest to disclose the business and financial interests of the members on the same lines as that of the Rajya Sabha.
- June 2013: The Central Information Commission (CIC) in an effort towards making political parties transparent as well as accountable in their functioning, declared the six national parties BJP, INC, BSP, CPI, CPI(M), and NCP as public authorities. All six parties refused to comply with CIC's order. In 2015, a petition was filed by ADR in the Supreme Court to implement CIC's order by bringing them under the preview of the Right to Information Act, 2005.
- July 2013: Supreme Court delivered a Judgment on a petition filed by Lily Thomas and Lok Prahari NGO, (ADR Intervened) setting aside clause 8(4) of the Representation of the People Act. As a result of which sitting MPs and MLAs were barred from holding office on being Convicted in a Court of Law.
- September 2013: ADR had also intervened in the petition filed by Common Cause for having a separate button on the Electronic Voting Machine (EVM) with the option of 'None of the Above (NOTA).' The Supreme Court gave a favorable ruling on 27 September 2013 and the NOTA button was inserted in the EVM machines for the Lok Sabha elections in 2014.
- May 2014: The Delhi High Court issued notices to the Government of India and the Election Commission on a petition filed by ADR to monitor election expenditure of political parties.
- August 2016: Prof. Trilochan Sastry, Chairman of ADR, represented ADR at the 3rd Asian Electoral Stakeholder Forum (AESF III) conference in Bali, Indonesia.
- February 2018: On a petition of Lok Prahari regarding the disproportionate asset increase of the MPs & MLAs, Supreme Court made it mandatory for candidates to declare sources of income of spouses & dependents in Form 26 of affidavits. ADR intervened in the matter & also provided all the necessary data.
- March 2023: On ADR's petition challenging the constitutional validity of the practice of the appointment of Chief Election Commissioner and Election Commissioners by the Executive, the Supreme Court gave a landmark judgment in favour of ADR by directing the appointment of Members of the Election Commission to be done on the advice of a committee comprising the Prime Minister, Chief Justice of India and the Leader of Opposition (or the leader of the single largest opposition party) in the Lok Sabha.
- February 2024: On ADR's petition challenging the Finance Act, 2017; Electoral Bonds and Removal of company's limit, the Supreme Court gave a landmark judgment in favour of ADR by holding the anonymous, unregulated and unlimited funding through electoral bonds and companies as unconstitutional.
- April 2024: The Supreme Court refused ADR's prayer for counting of 100% VVPATs in all EVMs but directed ECI to:
  1. seal and store Symbol Loading Unit (SLU) for a period of 45 days and
  2. a system of cross-verification on a request made by candidates in serial numbers 2 and 3 within 7 days after the declaration of results.

== ADR Reports ==
ADR has become the monopolistic single data point for information/analysis of background details (criminal, financial, and others) of politicians and of financial information of political parties.

Over the years, its work has helped make political information more accessible to the republic.

== Awards ==
Year	Name of Award or Honour	Awarding Organisation	Reference
October 2024	Jaivic Bharat Mission conferred on ADR the Hon'ble Mr Justice D. S. Tewatia Memorial Award for Outstanding Contribution to National-Development.	Hon'ble Mr Justice D. S. Tewatia Memorial Award	https://theraisinahills.com/first-justice-debi-singh-tewatia-memorial-recognizes-change-agents/
October 2024	Delhi High Court Bar Association and Live4Freedom LLP conferred the Fight 4 Justice Awards, II Edition, 2024 in the "Administration & Governance" category on the Association for Democratic Reforms (ADR) for its fight against the Electoral Bond Scheme, which was declared unconstitutional by the Supreme Court of India.	Fight 4 Justice Awards, II Edition, 2024	https://www.livelaw.in/high-court/delhi-high-court/delhi-high-court-bar-association-hosts-second-edition-of-fight-for-justice-awards-2024-to-honour-litigants-271719
April 2024	ADR on 27 April 2024 was awarded Yashraj Bharati Samman 2024 in the category of "Ethical Governance"	Yashraj Bharati Samman 2024	https://www.yashrajbharatisamman.org/ethical-governance-2024/
January 2024	Ms Rolly Shivhare, Madhya Pradesh State Coordinator of ADR, received an Appreciation Certificate for outstanding ADR voter awareness campaign conducted during the Madhya Pradesh Assembly Elections 2023.	Betul and Bhopal District Election Office	https://adrindia.org/sites/default/files/MP.jpg
February 2020	6th eNGO Challenge: ADR's Mera Vote Mera Desh campaign was the Winner for 2019–2020 in Governance & Livelihood category for raising awareness about a clean legislature & political representatives	Digital Empowerment Foundation	https://engochallenge.org/winners-2019-2020/
January 2020	National CSO Award for taking up measures for electoral awareness by organizing district level conference aiming togetherness with synergizing efforts towards strengthening democracy during the Lok Sabha Election, 2019	Election Commission of India (ECI)	https://ecisveep.nic.in/files/file/1200-national-voters-day-2020-brochure/
July 2019	First Democracy Award in the category of "Increasing Citizens' Participation in Electoral Process" at the hands of Hon'ble Vice President of India, Shri M. Venkaiah Naidu on 27 July 2019	SEC of Maharashtra	
December 2015	Outstanding achievement in the category of Citizen's Engagement at the International Electoral Awards 2015	iCPS, United Kingdom	
April 2014	NDTV Indian of the Year- India's Future	NDTV	
March 2014	Innovation for India Awards 2014	Marico Innovation Foundation	
December 2013	CNN-IBN Indian of the Year Award in Public Service Category	CNN-IBN	
January 2013	Social Impact Award in Advocacy and Empowerment	The Times of India	
August 2012	Mobile Innovations for Good Measure Award	mBillionth Award South Asia	
December 2011	ICT led Innovation for the Election Watch software of ADR and Webrosoft	NASSCOM	

== See also ==
- Democracy in India
- Election Commission of India
- List of think tanks in India
