= Kita Region =

Kita
- Region
- Coordinates: 13.050400°N 9.483300°W
- Country: Mali
- Capital: Kita

Area
  - Total: 35,680 km^{2} (13,780 sq mi)

Population (2023)
  - Total: 672,385
  - Density: 18.84/km^{2} (48.81/sq mi)

Kita Region is an administrative region in Mali. It was created from parts of the former Kayes Region and has its capital in the town of Kita. The region lies between Bamako and Kayes and borders Guinea to the south.

== Geography ==
Kita Region is located in western Mali, south-east of Kayes and west of the Greater Bamako area. It covers an area of 35,680 km². The area belongs to south-western Mali and receives more rainfall than the Sahelian regions of the north. The landscape is characterised by savannas, wooded zones, hill ranges and agricultural land. The region lies within the drainage basin of the Senegal River. Near the town of Kita rises Mount Kita, which shapes the townscape and the surrounding area.

== History ==
Historically, Kita belongs to the Mandé cultural area. The town of Kita developed into a regional administrative, market and transport centre. It gained importance partly because of its location on the Dakar–Niger Railway, which connected western Mali with Bamako and Senegal. During the colonial period and after independence, the town was an important transshipment point for agricultural products from the surrounding area.

The area of present-day Kita Region long belonged to Kayes Region after Mali’s independence as Kita Cercle. The creation of a separate Kita Region had already been envisaged in 2012, but was initially not implemented. Law No. 2023-006 of 13 March 2023 on the creation of 9 new administrative regions in the Republic of Mali confirmed the new territorial division and established Kita as a separate region.

== Administrative divisions ==
The region is divided into six cercles. According to the OCHA, it comprises 14 arrondissements, 33 communes and 374 villages, fractions and urban quarters. The region is predominantly rural; Kita, as the largest town, performs administrative and market functions.

Cercle code	Cercle	Communes
1201	Kita	11
1202	Sagabari	6
1203	Sébékoro	4
1204	Toukoto	3
1205	Séféto	6
1206	Sirakoro	3

== Population ==
In 2023, the region had a population of 672,385.

Year	Population
1998	303,647
2009	432,531
2023	672,385

Ethnicity in Kayes (2022)
1. Malinké (49.0%)
2. Bambara (25.2%)
3. Fula (15.6%)
4. Soninke (2.93%)
5. Senufo (2.13%)
6. Kakolo (1.92%)
7. Other (3.19%)

The population is ethnically and linguistically diverse. The main population groups include the Malinke, Bambara, Soninke and Peul/Fulbe. The main languages are Malinke and Bambara, with Bambara being the main lingua franca.

Mother tongues in Kita region (2022 census)
1. Malinke (48.03%)
2. Bambara (42.24%)
3. Fula (5.38%)
4. Maraka / Soninké (1.41%)
5. Minianka (1.36%)
6. Other Malian (1.47%)
7. Other African (0.01%)
8. Other foreign (0.10%)

Religiously, 98.8% of the population is Muslim and 0.80% Christian.

== Economy ==
The economy of Kita Region is based mainly on agriculture, livestock herding, trade and the processing of agricultural products. Crops grown include cotton, peanuts, cereals and other field crops. The area around Kita is agricultural, while Kita itself is a centre of trade and processing. Small-scale trade and crafts also play a role. Its location on transport routes between Bamako, Kayes and the western parts of the country supports Kita’s role as a regional supply and transshipment centre.
