= Gadougou I =

- Commune
- Location in Mali
- Coordinates: 12°35′13″N 9°48′16″W
- Country: Mali
- Region: Kayes Region
- Cercle: Kita Cercle

Population (2009 census)
  - Total: 25,775
- Time zone: UTC+0 (GMT)

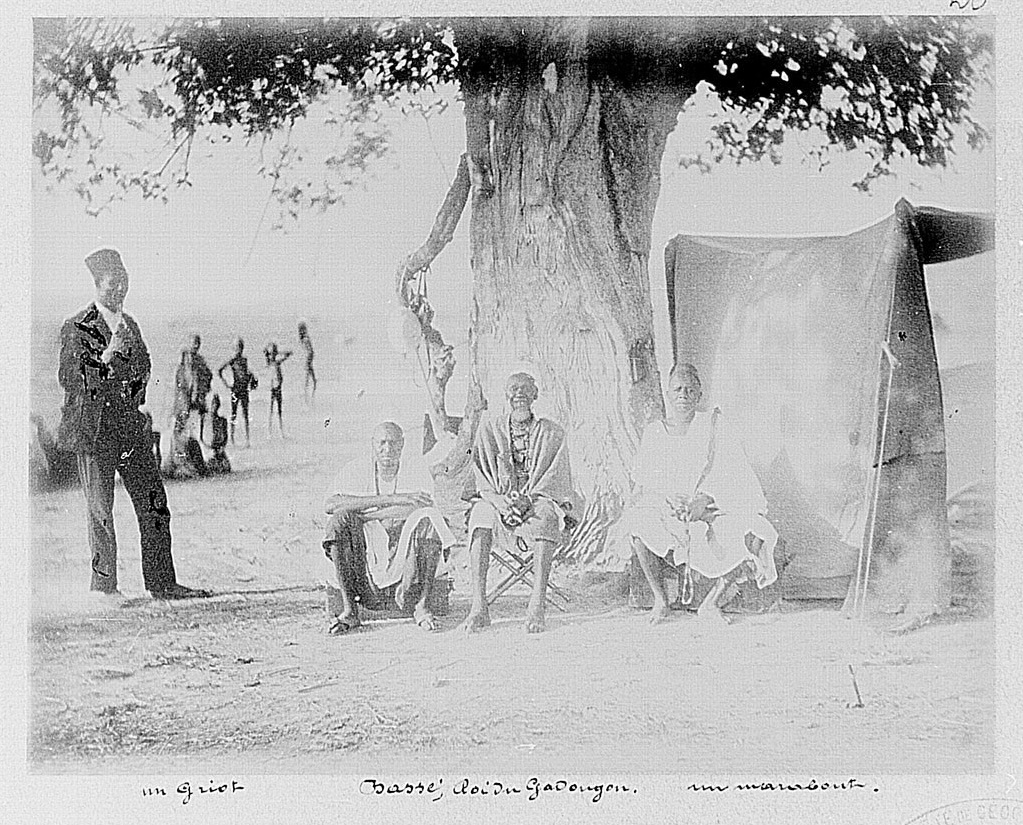
Bassé, King of Gadougou (1883)

Gadougou I is a rural commune that is located in Cercle of Kita, in the Kayes Region of south-western Mali. The commune includes 17 villages and in the 2009 census, it had a population of 25,775. Its administrative centre is the village of Sagabari, located in the southwestern part of the cercle, about 80 kilometres southwest of Kita. The principal village is Sagabari.

== Geography ==
Gadougou I is bordered by the communes of Bougaribaya to the north, Gadougou II to the east, Koulou to the south, and Kokofata to the west. The landscape is characterized by the ridges of the Fouta Djallon foothills. The Balé River, a tributary of the Bafing River, flows through the commune. Natural vegetation consists mainly of woodland and shrub savanna.

== Population ==
The commune includes 17 villages. The commune had a population of 25,400 in 2009, of whom 4,100 lived in Sagabari. The inhabitants are primarily Mandinka, with a minority of Fulbe. The main religions are Islam, Catholicism, and animism.

== Economy ==
The main economic activities are agriculture and animal husbandry. In addition to food crops, farmers cultivate cotton and groundnuts for sale.

== Infrastructure ==
Health services include three dispensaries, two maternity clinics, and a pharmacy depot. Water supply facilities comprise traditional wells and 31 drilled wells equipped with pumps.

=== Education ===
Gadougou I has 14 primary schools, two secondary schools, a Quranic school, and three literacy centres. The schools, development education centres, literacy centres, women's training centres, kindergartens and nursery schools of the commune of Gadougou I fall under the Pedagogical Animation Centre (Centre d’Animation Pédagogique) of Sagabari and the Teaching Academy (Académie d’Enseignement) of Kita.
