= Balia =

Balia may refer to:

== Places ==
- Ballia, in Uttar Pradesh, India
- Ballia district, in Uttar Pradesh, India
- Balia, Bangladesh (disambiguation)
- Balia, Mali

== Electoral constituencies ==
- Ballia (Lok Sabha constituency), in Uttar Pradesh, India
- Balia, Bihar (Lok Sabha constituency), in Bihar, India
- Ballia (Vidhan Sabha constituency), in Bihar, India
