= Abhishek Anand =

Indian politician

Member of Bihar Legislative Assembly
- Incumbent
- Assumed office 2025
- Preceded by: Raj Banshi Mahto
- Constituency: Cheria-Bariarpur

Personal details
- Party: Janata Dal (United)
- Profession: Politician

Abhishek Anand is an Indian politician and a member of Janata Dal (United) political party based in Bihar. He won the 2025 Bihar Legislative Assembly elections from Cheria-Bariarpur Assembly constituency of Begusarai district. He is the son of former Bihar minister Manju Verma and a grandson of former Communist Party of India leader and Bihar Legislative Assembly member Sukhdeo Mahto. He is a graduate from Indian Institute of Management Lucknow and worked in corporate before joining politics.

== Political career ==
As a new entrant in politics in 2025 Bihar Legislative Assembly elections, Anand faced tough competition from Sushil Kushwaha, son of former Bihar Chief Minister Satish Prasad Singh and Rashtriya Janata Dal candidate from Cheria Bariarpur Assembly constituency.
