= Bihat, Begusarai =

Town in Bihar, India

Bihat
- Residential Town
- Nickname: "Little Moscow"
- Location in Bihar, India
- Coordinates: 25°25′31″N 86°01′15″E
- Country: India
- State: Bihar
- District: Begusarai
- Block: Barauni

Government
  - Type: Nagar Parishad
  - Body: Bihat Nagar Parishad

Area
  - Total: 11.04 km^{2} (4.26 sq mi)
- Elevation: 46 m (151 ft)

Population (2011)
  - Total: 67,952
  - Density: 6,155/km^{2} (15,940/sq mi)

Languages
  - Official: Hindi
  - Regional: Maithili, Angika
- Time zone: UTC+5:30 (IST)
- PIN: 851135
- Vehicle registration: BR-09
- Nearest city: Begusarai
- Lok Sabha constituency: Begusarai
- Vidhan Sabha constituency: Teghra

Bihat is a residential town with municipality at Barauni Urban Region in the Begusarai district of the Indian state of Bihar. It is historically notable as a communist stronghold, which earned the town the nickname "Little Moscow".

== Geography ==
Bihat is located at 25°25′31″N 86°01′15″E. It has an elevation of about 50 metres (164 ft)above sea level. It has an area of about 11.09 sq km.

== Demographics ==
As per 2011 census of India the town has a population of 67,952 of which 35,965 are males while 31,987 are females. Population of Children with age of 0-6 is 10694 which is 15.74 % of total population of Bihat. Female Sex Ratio is of 889 against state average of 918. Moreover Child Sex Ratio in Bihat is around 880 compared to Bihar state average of 935. Literacy rate of Bihat city is 77.46 % higher than state average of 61.80 %. In Bihat, Male literacy is around 84.33 % while female literacy rate is 69.74 %.

=== Religion ===
Religion in Bihat (2011)
1. Hinduism (88.8%)
2. Islam (10.8%)
3. Others (0.40%)

Majority of inhabitants of Bihat are Hindus constituting about 88.8% of population while, Muslims are a significant minority with 10.8% of population. Other faiths constitute roughly 0.4% of population.

== History and politics ==
Bihat was known as the Little Moscow of Bihar due it being a Communist stronghold and centre of Left ideology at Barauni block in Begusarai district, it produced several notable Communist leaders including Chandrasekhar Singh popularly called the "Lenin of Bihar".

== Notable people ==
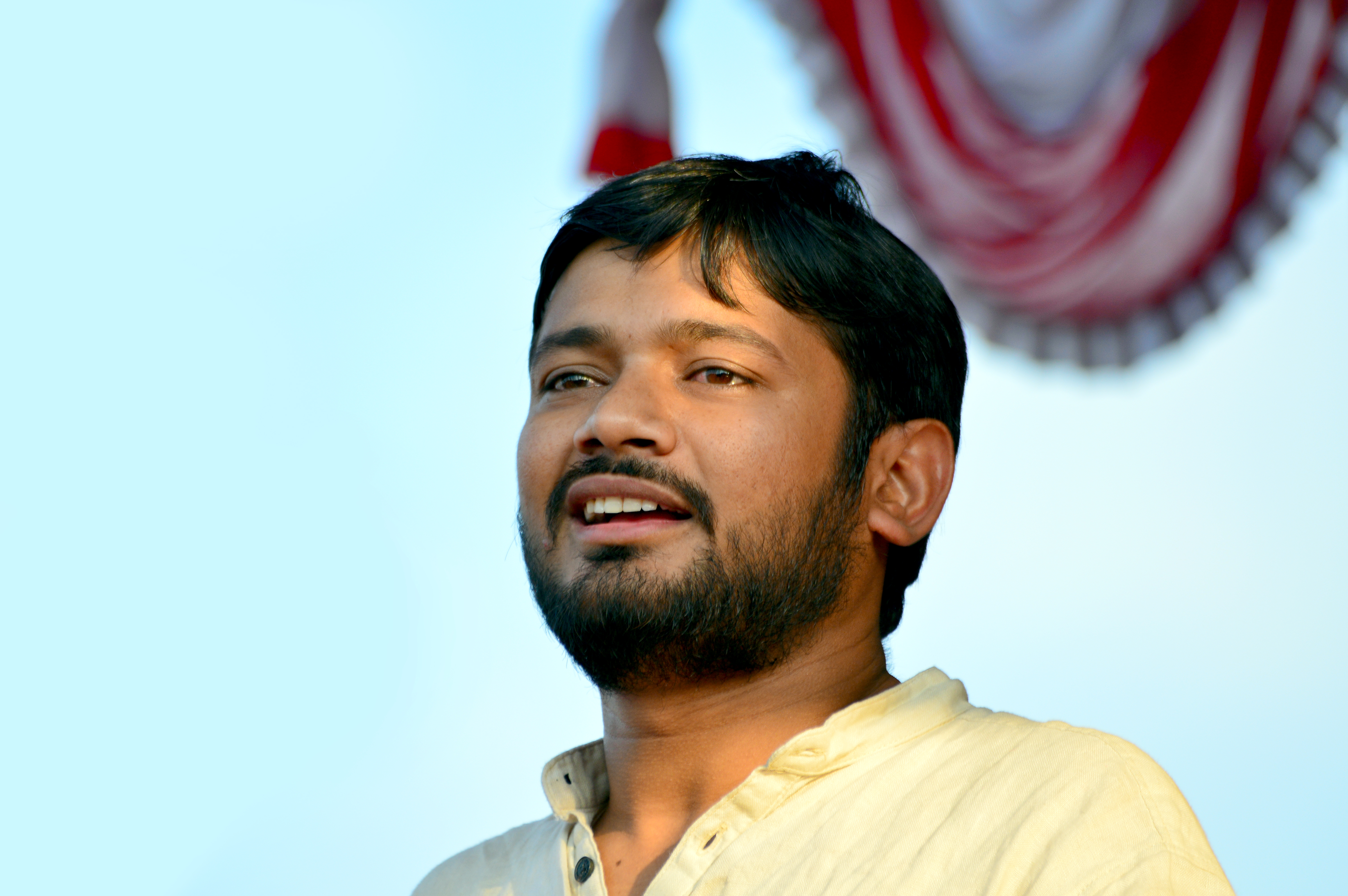
Kanhaiya Kumar

- Ram Charitra Singh, Congress leader and Irrigation Minister in Bihar's first cabinet
- Chandrasekhar Singh (1915–1976), Communist Party of India leader and the first Left party legislator in the Bihar assembly
- Balmiki Prasad Singh, former Union Home Secretary and Governor of Sikkim
- Kanhaiya Kumar (born 1987), former JNUSU president and political activist; his ancestral roots are in Bihat

== See also ==
- IOC Township, Barauni
- Urvarak Nagar, Barauni
- Barauni Assembly constituency
- Barauni Refinery Township
- Barauni Refinery
- HURL Barauni
- Barauni Junction railway station
