= Chandrasekhar Singh =

Indian politician (1915–1976)

Personal details
- Born: 26 December 1915 Bihat village, Begusarai district, Bihar
- Died: 19 July 1976 (aged 60) Patna, Bihar
- Party: Communist Party of India
- Spouse: Shakuntala Sinha
- Education: M.A. (Benaras Hindu University)
- Occupation: Politician

Chandrasekhar Singh (26 December 1915 – 19 July 1976 in Patna) was a leader from the Communist Party of India who served as a minister in the government of Bihar state.

== Family ==
Singh was born in Bihat (Masnadpur) village near Barauni in Begusarai district of Bihar. His father, Ramcharitra Singh, was a member of the Congress party, a member of the Bihar Legislative Assembly and a minister in the Dr. Sri Krishna Singh's cabinet. He is also a distant relative of former JNUSU president Kanhaiya Kumar.

== Career ==
Singh was a founding member of the Communist Party of India in Begusarai district. He was instrumental in converting Begusarai into a bastion of the communist party. Begusarai came to be known as Leningrad of Bihar and Singh's village, Bihat, earned the sobriquet Little Moscow. Begusarai has traditionally been a communist stronghold until recent years, when the Bharatiya Janata Party has won several local and national elections from the region.

Singh was elected from Teghra Vidhan Sabha constituency in 1962 and was the minister in first non-congress government in Bihar as a minister of Irrigation and Power then Agriculture.
