= From Bihar to Tihar =

2016 memoir by Kanhaiya Kumar

From Bihar To Tihar: My Political Journey
- Author: Kanhaiya Kumar
- Genre: Political science
- Publisher: Juggernaut Publication
- Publication date: October 3, 2016
- Publication place: India
- Pages: 264
- ISBN: 9781367503564

From Bihar To Tihar: My Political Journey is a memoir and political book written by then president of Jawaharlal Nehru University, former Communist Party of India candidate from Begusarai Lok Sabha and presently a politician of Indian National Congress, Kanhaiya Kumar. It was published on 3 October 2016.

== Plot ==
Kanhaiya Kumar has written about his life from childhood to Tihar Jail in this book.
