= Daféla =

- Village
- Location in Mali
- Coordinates: 12°58′14″N 9°23′54″W
- Country: Mali
- Region: Kayes Region
- Cercle: Kita Cercle
- Commune: Badia
- Time zone: UTC+0 (GMT)

Daféla is a village and principal settlement of the commune of Badia in the Cercle of Kita in the Kayes Region of south-western Mali.
