= Sebekoro, Koulikoro =

Sebekoro
- Commune and town
- Location in Mali
- Coordinates: 13°0′N 8°5′W
- Country: Mali
- Region: Kayes Region
- Cercle: Kayes Cercle

Population (1998)
  - Total: 13,445
- Time zone: UTC+0 (GMT)

Sebekoro or Sebecoro is a small town and commune in the Kita Cercle in the Kayes Region of south-western Mali. In 1998 the commune had a population of 13,445.
