= Founia Moribougou =

- Village
- Location in Mali
- Coordinates: 12°54′10″N 9°28′35″W
- Country: Mali
- Region: Kayes Region
- Cercle: Kita Cercle
- Commune: Benkadi Founia
- Elevation: 297 m (974 ft)
- Time zone: UTC+0 (GMT)

Founia Moribougou is a village and principal settlement of the commune of Benkadi Founia in the Cercle of Kita in the Kayes Region of south-western Mali.
