= Insaf =

Insaf (انصاف) is an Arabic word meaning justice or equity.

== Given name ==
- Insaf or Ensaf Haidar (born 1975), a Saudi-Canadian human rights activist.
- Insaf Yahyaoui (born 1981), a Tunisian judoka.

== Others ==
- El Insaf, a political party in Mauritania
  - El Insaf group, the corresponding Mauritanian parliamentary group in the National Assembly
- Insaf Party (Justice Party), a former Muslim political party in India

== See also ==
- Insaaf (disambiguation)
