= Sibikily =

- Village
- Location in Mali
- Coordinates: 13°6′0″N 9°26′0″W
- Country: Mali
- Region: Kayes Region
- Cercle: Kita Cercle
- Commune: Kita Nord
- Time zone: UTC+0 (GMT)

Sibikily is a village and principal settlement of the commune of Kita Nord in the Cercle of Kita in the Kayes Region of south-western Mali.
