= Balandougou =

Balandougou may refer to:

- Balandougou, Guinea
- Balandougou, Mali
