= Kofeba =

- Village
- Location in Mali
- Coordinates: 13°1′45″N 9°35′9″W
- Country: Mali
- Region: Kayes Region
- Cercle: Kita Cercle
- Commune: Kita Ouest
- Time zone: UTC+0 (GMT)

Kofeba is a village and principal settlement of the commune of Kita Ouest in the Cercle of Kita in the Kayes Region of south-western Mali.
