= Battle of Guémoukoura =

1872 battle in Mali

Date	Early March 1872
Location	Guémoukoura, Mali
Result	Umarian victory

Belligerents
Umarian State (Toucouleur Empire)	Bamana Rebels

Commanders and leaders
Ahmadu Tall	Unknown

Strength
10,000 soldiers	Unknown

Casualties and losses
Unknown	Unknown

The Battle of Guémoukoura (also known as Gemukura or Guémoukouraba, literally "the new Guémou".) was a battle in early March of 1872 between forces of the Umarian State (Toucouleur Empire), led by Ahmadu Tall, and Bamana forces led by members of the Massassi Dynasty, the former rulers of Kaarta. The battle ended in an Umarian victory, resulting in the dispersal of Bamana forces from the fortress.

== Background ==
Modern-day borders of Mali. Kaarta was centered around the areas of Nioro and Guémoukoura.

The kingdom of Kaarta was a political entity in present-day western Mali. At the time of the jihad of Omar Tall it was ruled by the Massassi dynasty, an ethnic Bamana royal family. Their rule over Kaarta came to an end in 1855 with its fall to Omar's forces. With Umarian control over Kaarta secure by 1857, Bamana forces led by members of the Massassi dynasty established themselves in Bélégougou to resist Umarian power from there. In addition, they were joined by Ségovian Bamana forces, who in 1868 were defeated at Kènyè (near Ségou) by Ahmadu Tall's armies (who took power following his father's death in 1864.)

In 1870, Bamana forces achieved a breakthrough in their resistance through the occupation of Guémoukoura, a fortress south of Kaarta. Their occupation of the settlement was allowed by a civil war in the Umarian State. Habib and Moktar, two brothers of Ahmadu, had rebelled in the empire's western provinces. Preparations by Ahmadu to counter this Bamana advance only began in early 1871, following victory over his brothers for control of the empire. Chris Hansen argues that Continued resistance from Futanke (Umarian) forces loyal to Habib and Moktar prevented him from launching his campaign during this year. As such, Ahmadu had to wait until 1872 before he was in a position to attack Guémoukoura. However, Benjamin Oloruntimehin asserts that a battle between Bamana and Umarian forces was fought over the town in 1871, ending in the death of Bamana military leader Boussefi.

== Battle ==
Ahmadu left Nioro in February of 1872 with an army of perhaps 10,000 soldiers, arriving at Guémoukoura in early March. The fortress was attacked at dawn by Umarian forces, who set fire to the village while its defenders were sleeping. Few details on the course of the battle are present in contemporary Umarian histories of the battle, suggesting it was won by Ahmadu's forces without much fighting. A second settlement was attacked the following day, dispersing remaining Bamana forces from the region. After a few more days in the region, Ahmadu returned north with his army. Meanwhile, the remaining Bamana forces withdrew to Kagoro, near Guékoumoura.

== Aftermath ==
The campaign against Guémoukoura was not long or dramatic. Nonetheless, Ahmadu hoped to use the victory to rally support for his rule in Kaarta. Meanwhile, it did not end Bamana resistance against the Umarian State as their forces kept fighting on despite this setback. Sometime after the battle, a victory was achieved over Umarian forces at Guigné. Further to the northwest, Bamana forces in Diafunu continued to fight for some years until March of 1877.

== Sources ==
- Djata, Sundiata (1997). The Bamana Empire by the Niger. Princeton: Markus Wiener Publishers.
- Hansen, John (1989). Umarian Karta (Mali, West Africa) During the Late Nineteenth Century: Dissent and Revolt Among the Futanke After Umar Tal’s Holy War (Thesis). East Lansing: Michigan State University.
- Oloruntimehin, Benjamin Olatunji (1968). "Résistance Movements in the Tukulor Empire". Cahiers d'études africaines. 8 (29): 128-129.
- Robinson, David (1985). The Holy War of Umar Tal: The Western Sudan in the mid-Nineteenth Century. Oxford: the Clarendon Press.
- Saint-Martin, Yves-Jean (1970). L’empire toucouleur, 1848-1897. Paris: Le Livre africain.
