= Niagané =

- Town
- Location in Mali
- Coordinates: 14°15′55″N 9°44′30″W
- Country: Mali
- Region: Kayes Region
- Cercle: Kita Cercle
- Commune: Séféto Nord
- Elevation: 272 m (892 ft)
- Time zone: UTC+0 (GMT)

Niagané is a small town and principal settlement of the rural commune of Séféto Nord in the Cercle of Kita in the Kayes Region of south-western Mali.
