= Parveen Amanullah =

Indian social activist turned politician

- परवीन अमानुल्लाह

Member of the Bihar Legislative Assembly
- In office 2010–2014
- Leader: Nitish Kumar
- Preceded by: Jamshed Ashraf
- Succeeded by: Shreenarayan Yadav
- Constituency: Sahebpur Kamal

Minister of Social Welfare in Government of Bihar
- In office 26 November 2010 – 20 May 2014
- Preceded by: Damodar Rawat
- Leader: Nitish Kumar

Personal details
- Born: Syeda Parveen Shahab; 1958
- Died: 1 October 2023 (aged 64–65) New Delhi
- Party: Aam Aadmi Party
- Other political affiliations: Janata Dal (United)
- Spouse: Afzal Amanullah
- Parent: Syed Shahabuddin (father)
- Education: University of Delhi

Parveen Amanullah (1958-1 October 2023) was an Indian social activist turned politician. She held the post of Minister of Social Welfare in the Government of Bihar led by Chief Minister Nitish Kumar from 2010 to 2014.

== Early life ==
Amanullah was the daughter of former Member of the Lok Sabha from Kishanganj Lok Sabha constituency, Syed Shahabuddin and the wife of senior Bihar cadre IAS officer Afzal Amanullah.

== Political career ==
Before entering politics she was known for her activism, especially in regard to her use of the Right to Information Act, 2005 to bring out the apathy prevalent in government institutions.

She was a member of the Aam Aadmi Party and had unsuccessfully contested the 2014 Indian general election against the BJP Member of Parliament Shatrughan Sinha from the Patna Sahib Lok Sabha constituency. She was elected as a member of the Bihar Legislative Assembly in 2010 from the Sahebpur Kamal constituency in Begusarai district as a candidate of the Janata Dal (United) after defeating Rashtriya Janata Dal's Shreenarayan Yadav.

She became the Social Welfare minister of Bihar in Nitish Kumar's government and held the portfolio until February 2014 when she resigned from JD(U) citing "governance issues" and "lack of work satisfaction". She joined Arvind Kejriwal's Aam Aadmi Party two days later.
