= Gallé, Mali =

Gallé
- Village
- Location in Mali
- Coordinates: 12°35′5″N 9°30′12″W
- Country: Mali
- Region: Kayes Region
- Cercle: Kita Cercle
- Commune: Gadougou II
- Elevation: 305 m (1,001 ft)
- Time zone: UTC+0 (GMT)

Gallé is a village and principal settlement of the commune of Gadougou II in the Cercle of Kita in the Kayes Region of south-western Mali. As of 2009, the commune has a total population of just over 9,000.
