= Kourouninkoto =

- Commune and town
- Location in Mali
- Coordinates: 13°51′28″N 9°34′37″W
- Country: Mali
- Region: Kayes Region
- Cercle: Kita Cercle

Area
  - Total: 847 km^{2} (327 sq mi)
- Elevation: 267 m (876 ft)

Population (2009 census)
  - Total: 5,335
  - Density: 6.30/km^{2} (16.3/sq mi)
- Time zone: UTC+0 (GMT)

Kourouninkoto is a small town and urban commune in the Cercle of Kita in the Kayes Region of south-western Mali.

== Climate ==
The urban district has a Sudano Sahelian climate. The average annual rainfall is around 350 mm with nearly all of it falling between late June and mid September.

== Hydrography ==
The town is watered by the river Baoulé located 20 km from the town. There are temporary streams during the rainy season. There is a water purification plant in Kourouninkoto that provides potable water through a robine system.

== Geography ==
Kourouninkoto is located in a valley surrounded by the Sokaroba mountain to the east, Kouroubonda mountain to the North, and Satankourou mountain to the west.

== Population ==
In the 2009 census Kourouninkoto had a population of 5,335 inhabitants. This population consists of multiple ethnic groups; Malinke (majority), Bambara, Kakolos, Peulh, Sarakolé, Diawambé.

== Economy ==
Kourouninkoto's economy is agriculture based. Farming is practiced by 96 percent of the workforce. Major crops are cotton, corn, millet, rice, and peanuts.

== Transportation ==
The town is served by a large section of Regional Road 12. Transport vehicles leave daily from Kita to Kourouninkoto.
