= Namala =

Namala Guimba
- Commune and town
- Location in Mali
- Coordinates: 13°21′51″N 9°23′11″W
- Country: Mali
- Region: Kayes Region
- Cercle: Kita Cercle

Population (2009 census)
  - Total: 15,667
- Time zone: UTC+0 (GMT)

Namala or Namala Guimba is a small town and commune in the Cercle of Kita in the Kayes Region of south-western Mali. The commune contains 10 villages and in the 2009 census had a population of 15,667.
