= Guémoukouraba =

- Commune and village
- Location in Mali
- Coordinates: 14°15′50″N 9°19′15″W
- Country: Mali
- Region: Kayes Region
- Cercle: Kita Cercle

Population (2009 census)
  - Total: 10,094
- Time zone: UTC+0 (GMT)

Guémoukouraba (also known as Gemukura or Guémoukouraba, literally "the new Guémou".) is a village and rural commune in the Cercle of Kita in the Kayes Region of south-western Mali. The commune includes 5 villages and in the 2009 census had a population of 10,094.

A battle took place here in early March 1872.
