= Senko, Mali =

Senko
- Commune and village
- Location in Mali
- Coordinates: 12°48′36″N 9°21′13″W
- Country: Mali
- Region: Kayes Region
- Cercle: Kita Cercle

Area
  - Total: 800 km^{2} (310 sq mi)

Population (2009 census)
  - Total: 9,701
  - Density: 12/km^{2} (31/sq mi)
- Time zone: UTC+0 (GMT)

Senko is a village and rural commune in the Cercle of Kita in the Kayes Region of south-western Mali. The commune includes 8 villages and in the 2009 census had a population of 9,701.
