= Ram Jeevan Singh =

Indian politician (born 1932)

Member of Parliament, Lok Sabha
- In office 1977–1980
- Succeeded by: Surya Narayan Singh
- In office 1999–2004
- Preceded by: Raj Banshi Mahto
- Succeeded by: Suraj Singh
- Constituency: Balia, Bihar

Personal details
- Born: 2 November 1932 Malpur, Munger district, Bihar, British India
- Party: Janata Dal (United)
- Other political affiliations: Janata Dal, Janata Party
- Spouse: Asha Devi

Ram Jeevan Singh (born 2 November 1932) is an Indian politician. He was elected to the Lok Sabha, the lower house of the Parliament of India from the Balia in Bihar as a member of the Janata Dal (United).
