= Benkadi Founia =

- Commune
- Location in Mali
- Coordinates: 12°54′10″N 9°28′35″W
- Country: Mali
- Region: Kayes Region
- Cercle: Kita Cercle

Population (2009)
  - Total: 11,599
- Time zone: UTC+0 (GMT)

Benkadi Founia is a rural commune in the Cercle of Kita in the Kayes Region of south-western Mali. The commune includes 14 villages and in the 2009 census had a population of 11,599. The principal village is Founia Moribougou.
