= Makano, Mali =

Makano
- Commune and town
- Location in Mali
- Coordinates: 12°40′40″N 9°2′50″W
- Country: Mali
- Region: Kayes Region
- Cercle: Kita Cercle

Population (2009 census)
  - Total: 9,826
- Time zone: UTC+0 (GMT)

Makano or Makono is a small town and rural commune in the Cercle of Kita in the Kayes Region of southwestern Mali, near the border of Guinea. The commune includes 14 villages and in the 2009 census had a population of 9,826.
