= Ballia Assembly constituency =

Coordinates: 25°25′09.000″N 86°18′44″E

Ballia
- Former constituency for the Bihar Legislative Assembly

Constituency details
- Country: India
- Region: East India
- State: Bihar
- District: Begusarai
- Lok Sabha constituency: Balia
- Established: 1951
- Abolished: 2010

Ballia Assembly constituency was an assembly constituency in Begusarai district in the Indian state of Bihar.

As a consequence of the orders of the Delimitation Commission of India, Ballia Assembly constituency ceased to exist in 2010.

It was a part of Balia Lok Sabha constituency. This assembly region is now a part of new Sahebpur Kamal Assembly.

Ballia Assembly constituency comprised Ballia (Begusarai) and Sahebpur Kamal Blocks.

== Results ==
=== 1977-2010 ===
In the October 2010 Bihar Assembly elections, Shreenarayan Yadav of Rashtriya Janata Dal won the Ballia seat defeating his nearest rival Jamshed Ashraf of Janata Dal United. Shri. Shreenarayan Yadav has won this constituency 9 times. Only winners and runners are being mentioned. Shreenarayan Yadav of RJD defeated Jamshed Ashraf of LJP in October 2005 and in February 2005, Md. Tanweer Hasan of JD(U) in 2000, Krishna Mohan Yadav of Independent in 1995, Samsu Joha of Congress in 1990, Samsu Joha of Congress in 1985, Chandrabhanu Devi of Congress (I) in 1980 and Ram Lakhan Yadav of Congress in 1977.

== Member of Legislative Assembly (MLA) ==
Year	Member	Party
1952	Brahma Deo Narayan Sinha	Indian National Congress
1957	Brahma Deo Narayan Sinha	Indian National Congress
1962	Prema Devi	Indian National Congress
1967	A. Mishra	Samyukta Socialist Party
1969	Jamaluddin	Indian National Congress
1972	Chandra Chur Deo	Bharatiya Jana Sangh
1977	Chandra Chur Deo	Janata Party
1980	Shreenarayan Yadav	Janata Party (Secular)
1985	Samsu Zeha	Indian National Congress
1990	Shreenarayan Yadav	Janata Dal
1995	Shreenarayan Yadav	Janata Dal
2000	Shreenarayan Yadav	Rashtriya Janata Dal
2005	Shreenarayan Yadav	Rashtriya Janata Dal
2005	Jamshed Asraf	Janata Dal (United)
2010 onwards: See Sahebpur Kamal
