= Chanra Bhanu Devi =

Indian politician

Member of Parliament, Lok Sabha
- In office 1984–1989
- Preceded by: Surya Narayan Singh
- Succeeded by: Surya Narayan Singh
- Constituency: Balia, Bihar

Personal details
- Born: 18 November 1947 Ramdiri Village, Begusarai District, Bihar, India
- Died: 6 September 2008 (aged 60) Patna, Bihar
- Party: Indian National Congress

Chanra Bhanu Devi was an Indian politician. She was elected to the Lok Sabha, the lower house of the Parliament of India from the Balia in Bihar as a member of the Indian National Congress.
