= Sagabari =

- Village
- Location in Mali
- Coordinates: 12°35′13″N 9°48′16″W
- Country: Mali
- Region: Kayes Region
- Cercle: Kita Cercle
- Commune: Gadougou I
- Time zone: UTC+0 (GMT)

Sagabari is a village and principal settlement of the commune of Gadougou I in the Cercle of Kita in the Kayes Region of south-western Mali.
