= Séféto Nord =

- Commune
- Location in Mali
- Coordinates: 14°15′55″N 9°44′30″W
- Country: Mali
- Region: Kayes Region
- Cercle: Kita Cercle

Area
  - Total: 2,250 km^{2} (870 sq mi)

Population (2009 census)
  - Total: 9,671
  - Density: 4.30/km^{2} (11.1/sq mi)
- Time zone: UTC+0 (GMT)

Séféto Nord is a rural commune in the Cercle of Kita in the Kayes Region of south-western Mali. The commune includes 6 villages and in the 2009 census had a population of 9,671. The principal village is Niagané.
