= Sahebpur Kamal Assembly constituency =

Coordinates: 25°28′01″N 86°23′57″E

Sahebpur Kamal
- Constituency No. 145 for the Bihar Legislative Assembly

Constituency details
- Country: India
- Region: East India
- State: Bihar
- District: Begusarai
- Lok Sabha constituency: Begusarai Lok Sabha
- Established: 2008
- Total electors: 263,289
- Reservation: None

Member of Legislative Assembly
- 18th Bihar Legislative Assembly
- Incumbent Satanand Sambuddha
- Party: RJD
- Alliance: MGB
- Elected year: 2025

Sahebpur Kamal (Balia) Assembly constituency is an assembly constituency in Begusarai district in the Indian state of Bihar.

== Overview ==
As per Delimitation of Parliamentary and Assembly constituencies Order, 2008, No. 145 Sahebpur Kamal Assembly constituency is composed of the following: Sahebpur Kamal and Ballia community development blocks.

Sahebpur Kamal Assembly constituency is part of No. 24 Begusarai (Lok Sabha constituency). As a consequence of the orders of the Delimitation Commission of India, Ballia Assembly constituency ceased to exist in 2010.

== Members of the Legislative Assembly ==
Year	Member	Party
1952-2008: See Ballia Assembly constituency
2010	Parveen Amanullah	Janata Dal (United)
2014^	Shreenarayan Yadav	Rashtriya Janata Dal
2015	Shreenarayan Yadav	Rashtriya Janata Dal
2020	Satanand Sambuddha	Rashtriya Janata Dal
2025	Satanand Sambuddha	Rashtriya Janata Dal

^by-election

== Election results ==
=== 2025 ===
Bihar Assembly election, 2025:Sahebpur Kamal
Party	Candidate	Votes	%	±%
RJD	Satanand Sambuddha	76,798	40.49	−0.96
LJP(RV)	Surendra Kumar	61,077	32.2	
Independent	Shashikant Kumar Shashi	34,781	18.34	
Independent	Md. Shahzaduzzama Alias Saify	4,905	2.59	
JSP	Md. Abdullah	3,396	1.79	
NOTA	None of the above	1,751	0.92	−1.43
Majority		15,721	8.29	−0.8
Turnout		189,684	72.04	+9.27
RJD hold		Swing		

=== 2020 ===
Bihar Assembly election, 2020: Sahebpur Kamal
Party	Candidate	Votes	%	±%
RJD	Satanand Sambuddha	64,888	41.45	−15.67
JD(U)	Shashikant Kumar Shashi	50,663	32.36	
LJP	Surendra Kumar	22,871	14.61	−9.31
AIMIM	Gore Lal Ray	7,933	5.07	
Independent	Shyamal Prasad Yadav	1,962	1.25	
Independent	Md. Shahzaduzzama	1,429	0.91	
NOTA	None of the above	3,672	2.35	−0.53
Majority		14,225	9.09	−24.11
Turnout		156,563	62.77	+4.21
RJD hold		Swing		

=== 2015 ===
Bihar Assembly election, 2015: Sahebpur Kamal
Party	Candidate	Votes	%	±%
RJD	Shreenarayan Yadav	78,225	57.12	
LJP	M.D. Aslam	32,751	23.92	
Independent	Surendra Vivek	12,259	8.95	
CPI(ML)L	S.M. Noor Alam	2,198	1.61	
Independent	Maulana Kasim	1,874	1.37	
BSP	Sarita Devi	1,804	1.32	
NOTA	None of the above	3,941	2.88	
Majority		45,474	33.2	
Turnout		136,947	58.56	
RJD hold		Swing		

=== 2014 ===
By-election,2014: Sahebpur Kamal
Party	Candidate	Votes	%	±%
RJD	Shreenarayan Yadav	53,813	39.01	
BJP	Shashikant Kumar Shashi	37,178	26.95	
JD(U)	Shabnam Perwin	32,665	23.68	
INC	Ravindra Kumar Singh	4,108	2.98	
Turnout		140,808	72.6	
Registered electors		193,868		
RJD gain from JD(U)		Swing		

=== 2010 ===
Bihar Assembly election, 2010: Sahebpur Kamal
Party	Candidate	Votes	%	±%
JD(U)	Parveen Amanullah	46,391	42.96	
RJD	Shreenarayan Yadav	35,280	32.67	
INC	Rakesh Singh	9,578	8.87	
Majority		11,048		
Turnout		1,07,994	55.70	
Registered electors		2,43,998		
JD(U) hold		Swing		
