= Djidian =

- Commune and village
- Location in Mali
- Coordinates: 13°12′6″N 9°27′19″W
- Country: Mali
- Region: Kayes Region
- Cercle: Kita Cercle

Area
  - Total: 400 km^{2} (150 sq mi)

Population (2009 census)
  - Total: 18,702
  - Density: 47/km^{2} (120/sq mi)
- Time zone: UTC+0 (GMT)

Djidian is a village and rural commune in the Cercle of Kita in the Kayes Region of south-western Mali. The commune includes 14 villages and in the 2009 census had a population of 18,702.
