= Kita Nord =

- Commune
- Location in Mali
- Coordinates: 13°6′0″N 9°26′0″W
- Country: Mali
- Region: Kayes Region
- Cercle: Kita Cercle

Population (2009 census)
  - Total: 9,882
- Time zone: UTC+0 (GMT)

Kita Nord is a rural commune in the Cercle of Kita in the Kayes Region of south-western Mali. The commune includes 8 villages and in the 2009 census had a population of 9,882. The principal village is Sibikily.
