= Saboula =

- Commune
- Location in Mali
- Coordinates: 13°21′21″N 9°33′6″W
- Country: Mali
- Region: Kayes Region
- Cercle: Kita Cercle

Population (2009 census)
  - Total: 6,193
- Time zone: UTC+0 (GMT)

Saboula is a rural commune in the Cercle of Kita in the Kayes Region of south-western Mali. The commune contains four villages and in the 2009 census had a population of 6,193. The principal town is Balandougou.
