= Didenko =

- Commune and village
- Location in Mali
- Coordinates: 14°7′24″N 9°30′11″W
- Country: Mali
- Region: Kayes Region
- Cercle: Kita Cercle

Area
  - Total: 1,158 km^{2} (447 sq mi)
- Elevation: 275 m (902 ft)

Population (2009 census)
  - Total: 9,840
  - Density: 8.50/km^{2} (22.0/sq mi)
- Time zone: UTC+0 (GMT)

Didenko or Dindanko is a village and rural commune in the Cercle of Kita in the Kayes Region of south-western Mali. The commune contains 7 villages and in the 2009 census has a population of 9,840.
