= Surya Narayan Singh =

Indian politician (born 1920)

Member of Parliament, Lok Sabha
- In office 1980–1984
- Preceded by: Ram Jeevan Singh
- Succeeded by: Chanra Bhanu Devi
- In office 1989–1996
- Preceded by: Chanra Bhanu Devi
- Succeeded by: Shatrughan Prasad Singh
- Constituency: Balia, Bihar

Personal details
- Born: 20 April 1920 Madhurapur Village, Bichlatola, Begusarai District, Bihar, British India
- Died: c. 1996
- Party: Communist Party of India

Surya Narayan Singh (20 April 1920 – c. 1996) was an Indian politician. He was elected to the Lok Sabha, the lower house of the Parliament of India from the Balia in Bihar as a member of the Communist Party of India. Singh's death was announced in the Lok Sabha on 26 February 1996.
