= Pratibha Rani =

Indian judge

Hon'ble Ms. Justice Pratibha Rani

Judge of the Delhi High Court
- In office 17 October 2011 – 28 August 2018
- Nominated by: S. H. Kapadia
- Appointed by: Pratibha Patil

Personal details
- Born: 25 August 1956 (age 70)
- Education: University of Delhi

Pratibha Rani (born 25 August 1956) is a former judge of the Delhi High Court, in Delhi, India. She gained public attention after writing several controversial judicial orders, including one granting bail to political activist Kanhaiya Kumar, in which she quoted Bollywood song lyrics and described surgical procedures to caution him; another order stating that women use the offence of rape as a "weapon for vengeance and personal vendetta"; and reducing sentences and granting bail to convicted offenders of child sexual abuse on the grounds that the child victim may have consented to the abuse.

== Career ==
=== Trial courts ===
Rani qualified into the Delhi Judicial Service and was appointed as a Metropolitan Magistrate, Civil Judge, and Labour Court judge. In 1996 she was transferred to the Delhi Higher Judicial Service. She served as a special judge for offences investigated by the Central Bureau of Investigation, and for offences prosecuted under the Narcotic Drugs and Psychotropic Substances Act. In 2011, she was appointed as a District and Sessions Judge in Delhi.

During her tenure as a trial judge, Rani has tried a number of significant cases, including the conviction a person for providing logistical aid in the 2005 Ram Janmabhoomi attack, a case concerning admissions-related scams at the Delhi College of Engineering, the closure of cases against Indian National Congress Minister Satish Sharma for his alleged involvement in the unlawful grant of licenses to operate petrol pumps during his tenure as Minister for Petroleum.

=== Delhi High Court ===
On 17 October 2011, Rani was appointed to the Delhi High Court as an additional judge, and was later confirmed as a permanent judge.

As a High Court judge, Rani has made several significant rulings in the field of family law. In 2016 she wrote a judgment establishing the principle that an adult son has no legal right to reside in his parents' home without their consent. In 2012, along with Judge Pradeep Nandrajog, she established that alimony was not payable if a divorced spouse had the qualifications and ability to earn an income but chose to remain unemployed.

Rani has also made significant contributions to the law governing the offence of rape in India. in 2016, along with Judge Reva Khetrapal, she affirmed a trial court's sentence of the death penalty to the four adult convicts of the 2012 Delhi gangrape and murder, in an order that was later affirmed by the Supreme Court and the convicts executed in 2020. In 2016, Rani also held that the refusal of a woman to consent to sexual intercourse with her husband amounted to "mental cruelty" and was grounds for divorce. Rani has also established judicial precedent allowing the grant of bail and reduction of sentences for convicted child offenders in cases where the child victim of abuse makes a statement indicating that the abuse was "consensual". In 2014, Rani granted bail to a man accused of assaulting a 15 year old child, describing the act as "consensual." In 2017, Rani acquitted a man of kidnapping, and reduced his sentence for rape, after the 14 year old victim made a statement professing her "deep love" for the convict, while affirming the provisions of the Protection of Children from Sexual Offences Act that indicate that children below the age of 18 are not capable of providing consent. In 2017, she passed an order dismissing a case of rape, and stated in her judgement that "...women use the law as a weapon for vengeance and personal vendetta,” when relationships fail.

In 2016, Rani wrote a controversial order granting interim bail to Indian political activist (and then student) Kanhaiya Kumar, in which she included Bollywood song lyrics and references to surgical procedures, and described student protesters as "gangrene" and "infection", going on to say that in such cases, "...amputation is the only treatment". The order was widely criticised, with Supreme Court senior counsel Rajeev Dhavan noting for the Indian Express that the order did not contain sufficient reference to the law on bail, legal scholar Usha Ramanathan criticizing the violent imagery of the ruling, Vice-Chancellor Faizan Mustafa of the NALSAR Academy of Law criticizing the use of "majoritarian rhetoric" in the judgment, and Arghya Sengupta, director of the Vidhi Center for Legal Policy, describing the order as being "in equal parts rhetorical, puerile and incomprehensible." Following objections from Kumar's lawyers, the case was subsequently transferred to another judge.

Rani retired from the Delhi High Court on 24 August 2018.

=== Post-judicial appointments ===
In 2019, Rani was appointed by the Delhi High Court to manage the affairs and functioning of the Sai Baba Temple on Lodhi Road, in Delhi, during an ongoing case about mismanagement of temple funds by officials of the managing trust of the temple. In the same year, the National Green Tribunal in Delhi appointed Rani to head a committee to investigate the running of industrial units in residential areas in Delhi, in an effort to address pollution in the city. Following the submission of the committee report, the Tribunal shut down over 4000 industrial units in Delhi.

== Personal life ==
Rani completed her graduate education at the University of Delhi, earning an undergraduate degree at Lady Shri Ram College, and an LL.B. degree at the university's Faculty of Law.
