= Balandougou, Mali =

Balandougou
- Town
- Location in Mali
- Coordinates: 13°21′21″N 9°33′6″W
- Country: Mali
- Region: Kayes Region
- Cercle: Kita Cercle
- Commune: Saboula

Area
  - Land: 1,240,192 km^{2} (478,841 sq mi)

Population (2012)
  - Total: 1,596,882
- Time zone: UTC+0 (GMT)

Balandougou is a small town and principal settlement of the commune of Saboula in the Cercle of Kita in the Kayes Region of south-western Mali.
