= Kassaro =

- Commune and village
- Location in Mali
- Coordinates: 12°57′16″N 8°52′52″W
- Country: Mali
- Region: Kayes Region
- Cercle: Kita Cercle

Area
  - Total: 1,076 km^{2} (415 sq mi)

Population (2009 census)
  - Total: 18,442
  - Density: 17.14/km^{2} (44.39/sq mi)
- Time zone: UTC+0 (GMT)

Kassaro is a village and rural commune in the Cercle of Kita in the Kayes Region of south-western Mali. The commune includes 18 villages and in the 2009 census had a population of 18,442.
