= Kita Ouest =

- Commune
- Location in Mali
- Coordinates: 13°1′45″N 9°35′0″W
- Country: Mali
- Region: Kayes Region
- Cercle: Kita Cercle

Area
  - Total: 900 km^{2} (350 sq mi)

Population (2009 census)
  - Total: 14,966
  - Density: 17/km^{2} (43/sq mi)
- Time zone: UTC+0 (GMT)

Kita Ouest is a rural commune in the Cercle of Kita in the Kayes Region of south-western Mali. The commune contains 16 villages and in the 2009 census had a population of 14,966. The main village (chef-lieu) is Kofeba.
