= Séféto Ouest =

- Commune
- Location in Mali
- Coordinates: 14°8′25″N 9°49′40″W
- Country: Mali
- Region: Kayes Region
- Cercle: Kita Cercle

Area
  - Total: 2,400 km^{2} (930 sq mi)

Population (2009 census)
  - Total: 19,418
  - Density: 8.1/km^{2} (21/sq mi)
- Time zone: UTC+0 (GMT)

Séféto Ouest is a rural commune in the Cercle of Kita in the Kayes Region of south-western Mali. The commune contains the main town (chef-lieu) of Séféto and 8 villages. In the 2009 census the commune had a population of 19,418.
