= Kotouba =

- Commune and village
- Location in Mali
- Coordinates: 13°28′32″N 8°43′32″W
- Country: Mali
- Region: Kayes Region
- Cercle: Kita Cercle

Area
  - Total: 927 km^{2} (358 sq mi)

Population (2009 census)
  - Total: 5,799
  - Density: 6.26/km^{2} (16.2/sq mi)
- Time zone: UTC+0 (GMT)

Kotouba is a village and rural commune in the Cercle of Kita in the Kayes Region of south-western Mali. The commune includes 5 villages and in the 2009 census had a population of 5,799.
