= Bendougouba =

- Commune and village
- Location in Mali
- Coordinates: 13°3′25″N 9°23′44″W
- Country: Mali
- Region: Kayes Region
- Cercle: Kita Cercle

Population (2009 census)
  - Total: 10,752
- Time zone: UTC+0 (GMT)

Bendougouba is a village and commune in the Cercle of Kita in the Kayes Region of south-western Mali. The commune includes 17 villages and in the 2009 census had a population 10,752.
