= Satanand Sambuddha =

Indian politician

Bihar Legislative Assembly
- In office 2020–Incumbent
- Preceded by: Shreenarayan Yadav
- Constituency: Sahebpur

Personal details
- Born: Satanand Sambuddha; 3 September 1962 (age 64) Begusarai, Bihar
- Party: Rashtriya Janata Dal
- Relatives: Shreenarayan Yadav (Father)
- Education: Magadh University
- Profession: Politician

Satanand Sambuddha also known as Lalan Yadav is an Indian politician from Bihar and a Member of the Bihar Legislative Assembly. Sambuddha won the Sahebpur Kamal Assembly constituency on the RJD ticket in the 2020 Bihar Legislative Assembly election.
