= Djougoun =

- Commune and village
- Location in Mali
- Coordinates: 14°16′5″N 9°36′40″W
- Country: Mali
- Region: Kayes Region
- Cercle: Kita Cercle

Area
  - Total: 592 km^{2} (229 sq mi)

Population (2009 census)
  - Total: 8,622
  - Density: 14.6/km^{2} (37.7/sq mi)
- Time zone: UTC+0 (GMT)

Djougoun is a village and rural commune in the Cercle of Kita in the Kayes Region of south-western Mali. The commune contains 5 villages and in the 2009 census had a population of 8,622.
