= Shatrughan Prasad Singh =

Indian politician

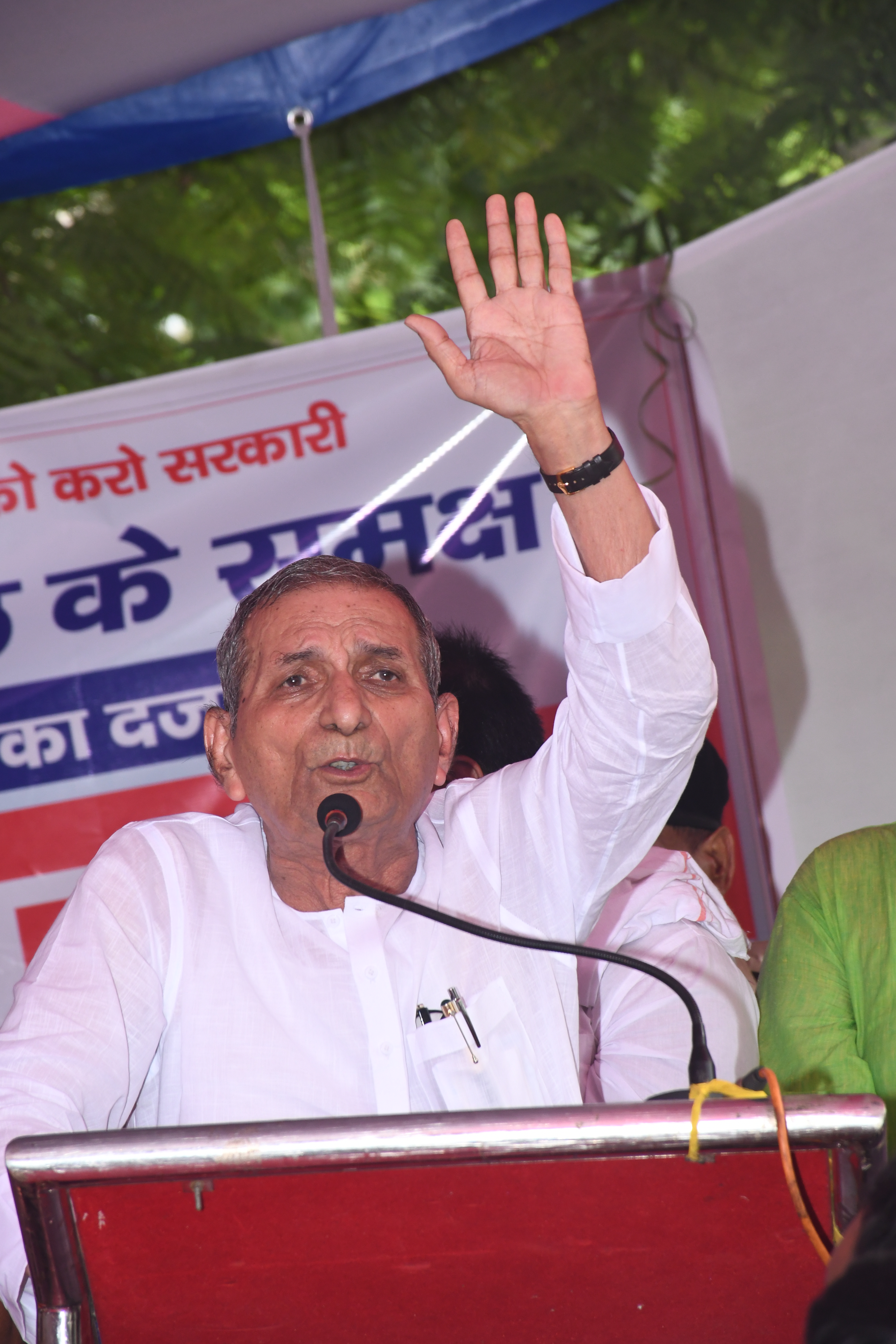
- Shatrughan Prasad Singh addressing a teachers’ protest in Patna, 2023

Member of Parliament, Lok Sabha
- In office 1996–1998
- Preceded by: Surya Narayan Singh
- Succeeded by: Raj Banshi Mahto
- Constituency: Balia, Bihar

Personal details
- Born: 1 January 1943 Safapur, Begusarai District, Bihar, British India
- Party: Communist Party of India

Shatrughan Prasad Singh is an Indian politician. He was elected to the Lok Sabha, the lower house of the Parliament of India from the Balia in Bihar as a member of the Communist Party of India.
