= Madina, Mali =

Madina
- Commune and village
- Location in Mali
- Coordinates: 13°24′3″N 8°51′36″W
- Country: Mali
- Region: Kayes Region
- Cercle: Kita Cercle

Area
  - Total: 5,875 km^{2} (2,268 sq mi)

Population (2009 census)
  - Total: 9,808
  - Density: 1.669/km^{2} (4.324/sq mi)
- Time zone: UTC+0 (GMT)

Madina is a village and rural commune in the Cercle of Kita in the Kayes Region of southwestern Mali. The commune contains 12 villages and in the 2009 census had a population of 9,808.
