= Cheria-Bariarpur Assembly constituency =

Coordinates: 25°56′18″N 86°05′57″E

Cheria-Bariarpur
- Constituency No. 141 for the Bihar Legislative Assembly

Constituency details
- Country: India
- Region: East India
- State: Bihar
- District: Begusarai
- Lok Sabha constituency: Begusarai Lok Sabha constituency
- Established: 1977
- Total electors: 272,019
- Reservation: None

Member of Legislative Assembly
- 18th Bihar Legislative Assembly
- Incumbent Abhishek Anand
- Party: JD(U)
- Alliance: NDA
- Elected year: 2025

Cheria-Bariarpur is an assembly constituency in Begusarai district in the Indian state of Bihar.

== Overview ==
As per Delimitation of Parliamentary and Assembly constituencies Order, 2008, No. 141 Cheria Bariarpur Assembly constituency is composed of the following: Cheria-Bariarpur, Khodabandpur and Chaurahi community development blocks; Pahsara (West) and Maheshwara gram panchayats of Nawkothi CD Block.

Cheria-Bariarpur Assembly constituency is part of No. 24 Begusarai (Lok Sabha constituency). The constituency is dominated by people belonging to Kushwaha caste.

== Members of the Legislative Assembly ==
Year	Name	Party
1977	Harihar Mahto	Indian National Congress
1980	Sukhdeo Mahto	Communist Party of India
1985	Harihar Mahto	Indian National Congress
1990	Ram Jiwan Singh	Janata Dal
1995	Ram Jiwan Singh	Janata Dal
2000	Ashok Kumar	Rashtriya Janata Dal
2005	Anil Choudhary	Lok Janshakti Party
2005	Anil Choudhary	Lok Janshakti Party
2010	Manju Verma	Janata Dal (United)
2015	Manju Verma	Janata Dal (United)
2020	Raj Banshi Mahto	Rashtriya Janata Dal
2025	Abhishek Anand	Janata Dal (United)

== Election results ==
=== 2025 ===
2025 Bihar Legislative Assembly election: Cheria-Bariarpur
Party	Candidate	Votes	%	±%
JD(U)	Abhishek Anand	75,081	39.24	+20.97
RJD	Sushil Kumar	70,962	37.09	−8.13
JSP	Mritunjay Kumar	24,595	12.86	
Independent	Ram Sakha Mahto	7,537	3.94	
Independent	Vijay Tanti	2,483	1.3	
NOTA	None of the above	5,151	2.69	+1.81
Majority		4,119	2.15	−24.8
Turnout		191,316	70.33	+9.43
JD(U) gain from RJD		Swing		

=== 2020 ===
Bihar Assembly election, 2020: Cheria-Bariarpur
Party	Candidate	Votes	%	±%
RJD	Raj Banshi Mahto	68,635	45.22	
JD(U)	Manju Verma	27,738	18.27	−32.1
LJP	Rakhi Devi	25,437	16.76	−12.15
RLSP	Sudarshan Singh	10,591	6.98	
Independent	Vatsa Purushottam	3,321	2.19	
Independent	Subodh Kumar Jha	2,872	1.89	
Independent	Sudama Paswan	2,541	1.67	
Independent	Ranjeet Yadav	1,494	0.98	
NOTA	None of the above	1,335	0.88	−3.26
Majority		40,897	26.95	+5.49
Turnout		151,791	60.9	+1.06
RJD gain from JD(U)		Swing	26.95%	

=== 2015 ===
Bihar Assembly election, 2015: Cheria-Bariarpur
Party	Candidate	Votes	%	±%
JD(U)	Manju Verma	69,795	50.37	
LJP	Anil Kumar Chaudhary	40,059	28.91	
CPI	Md. Abdul Hafiz Khan	8,092	5.84	
RJP	Raj Kishor Yadav	3,168	2.29	
BMP	Sarjan Sahani	2,682	1.94	
Sarvajan Kalyan Loktantrik Party	Laxmi Mahto	2,513	1.81	
Independent	Pradip Paswan	1,890	1.36	
Independent	Rakesh Kumar Varama	1,839	1.33	
BSP	Arun Paswan	1,634	1.18	
NOTA	None of the above	5,740	4.14	
Majority		29,736	21.46	
Turnout		138,565	59.84	

=== 2010 ===
In the 2010 state assembly elections, Manju Verma of JD(U) won the Cheria Bariarpur seat defeating her nearest rival Anil Kumar Chaudhary of LJP. Contests in most years were multi cornered but only winners and runners up are being mentioned. Anil Chaudhary of LJP defeated Kumari Savitri of RJD in October 2005 and Radha Krishna Singh of RJD in February 2005. Ashok Kumar of RJD defeated Anil Chaudhary of JD(U) in 2000. Ram Jeewan Singh of JD defeated Late Sri Sukh Deo Mahato of Congress in 1995 and Late Sri Sukhdeo Mahato, Independent, in 1990. Harihar Mahato of Congress defeated Late Sri Sukhdeo Mahato of CPI in 1985. Late Sri Sukhdeo Mahato of CPI defeated Harihar Mahato of Congress (I) in 1980. Harihar Mahato of Congress defeated Jubair Azam Zaffri of Janata Party.
