= Tambaga, Mali =

Tambaga
- Commune and village
- Location in Mali
- Coordinates: 12°58′8″N 9°52′22″W
- Country: Mali
- Region: Kayes Region
- Cercle: Kita Cercle

Population (2009)
  - Total: 11,152
- Time zone: UTC+0 (GMT)

Tambaga is a village and rural commune in the Cercle of Kita in the Kayes Region of south-western Mali. The commune contains 10 villages and in the 2009 census had a population of 11,152.
