= Reva Khetrapal =

Indian Judge and Lokayukta

Hon'ble Ms. Justice Reva Khetrapal

Lokayukta of Delhi
- Incumbent
- Assumed office 18 December 2015
- Nominated by: Delhi High Court
- Appointed by: Pranab Mukherjee

Judge of the Delhi High Court
- In office 28 February 2006 – 22 September 2014
- Nominated by: K.G. Balakrishnan
- Appointed by: A.P.J. Abdul Kalam

Personal details
- Born: 23 September 1952 (age 74)
- Education: University of Delhi

Reva Khetrapal (born 23 September 1952) is the current Lokayukta (ombudsman) for the National Capital Territory of Delhi, India, and a former judge of the Delhi High Court.

== Life ==
Khetrapal was born in Shimla, Himachal Pradesh, and was educated in Delhi. She earned a B.A. in history from Miranda House, and an LL.B. from the University of Delhi's Faculty of Law.

== Career ==
Khetrapal enrolled with the Bar Council of Delhi in 1975, and practiced law until 1991. In addition to private clients, she represented the Delhi Government as a counsel. She was appointed to the judiciary in 1991, becoming an Additional District and Sessions Judge in Delhi. In 1994, she was appointed a Special Judge dealing with cases prosecuted under the Narcotic Drugs and Psychotropic Substances Act. In 1994, she served as secretary to the Press Council of India.

=== Delhi High Court ===
Khetrapal was appointed to the Delhi High Court as an additional judge on 28 February 2006, and was later made a permanent judge. She retired from the court on 22 September 2014.

During her career as a High Court judge, Khetrapal adjudicated in a number of significant cases. In 2008, she ruled that an Indian film, Hari Puttar: A Comedy of Terrors, did not infringe on the copyright of the Harry Potter film franchise, holding that the differences between the two were evident. Along with Judge M. K. Sharma, she also dismissed a plea by the Government of India to prevent the removal of illegal constructions in and around Ministers' residences, ordering them to be demolished. In 2010, she became one of several judges from the High Courts in Delhi, Kerala, and Madras to voluntarily disclose details of their assets on the website of the Delhi High Court, in a bid to improve transparency and fight corruption. In 2012, Khetrapal adjudicated in a case concerning an extended strike by pilots of Air India, India's flagship airline, urging both parties to arrive at an amicable resolution. The strike was eventually declared illegal, and the pilots ordered to return to work.

In 2009, she granted bail to BJP politician Varun Gandhi in a case filed against him for making provocative speeches concerning religion, while the Bharatiya Janata Party disassociated themselves with him. In 2016, along with Judge Pratibha Rani, she upheld the sentence of the death penalty to the four adult convicts in the 2012 Delhi gangrape and murder case. Their order was affirmed by the Indian Supreme Court, and the convicts were executed in 2020.

While a High Court judge, Khetrapal was instrumental in establishing a scheme to provide financial aid for children whose parents are incarcerated. She also served as the Chairperson of the Delhi International Arbitration Center.

=== Lokayukta ===
On 18 December 2015, Khetrapal was appointed the Lokayukta (ombudsman) of Delhi, after being nominated for the position by a panel of judges from the Delhi High Court, and then appointed by the President of India, Pranab Mukherjee. Her term of office is for five years.

In 2019, Khetrapal, as Lokayukta, issued a notice to all members of the Delhi Legislative Assembly for failing to disclose their assets. In response, the Speaker of the Delhi Legislative Assembly stated that legislators are not legally required to make such disclosures. She is also conducting ongoing proceedings into a complaint regarding corruption, filed by Delhi BJP leader Manoj Tiwari against Aam Aadmi Party ministers Manish Sisodia and Satyender Jain.
