= Séféto =

- Town
- Location in Mali
- Coordinates: 14°8′25″N 9°49′40″W
- Country: Mali
- Region: Kayes Region
- Cercle: Kita Cercle
- Commune: Séféto Ouest
- Elevation: 260 m (850 ft)
- Time zone: UTC+0 (GMT)

Séféto is a small town and principal settlement of the commune of Séféto Ouest in the Cercle of Kita in the Kayes Region of south-western Mali.
