= Balia, Bihar Lok Sabha constituency =

Former constituency of the Indian parliament in Bihar

Coordinates: 26.0°N 85.3°E

Balia, Bihar Lok Sabha
- Former Lok Sabha constituency

Constituency details
- Country: India
- Region: East India
- State: Bihar
- Assembly constituencies: Ballia; Cheria-Bariarpur; Bachhwara; Barauni; Alauli; Bakhri
- Established: 1976
- Abolished: 2009
- Reservation: None

Balia was a Lok Sabha constituency in Bihar.

== Assembly segments ==
Balia (Lok Sabha constituency) was composed of the following assembly segments in 2004:

- Balia
- Barauni
- Bachwara
- Cheria Bariarpur
- Bakhri
- Alauli

== Members of Parliament ==
Year	Name	Party
1952-76 : Constituency did not exist
1977	Ram Jeevan Singh	Janata Party
1980	Surya Narayan Singh	Communist Party of India
1984	Chanra Bhanu Devi	Indian National Congress
1989	Surya Narayan Singh	Communist Party of India
1991	Surya Narayan Singh	Communist Party of India
1996	Shatrughan Prasad Singh	Communist Party of India
1998	Raj Banshi Mahto	Rashtriya Janata Dal
1999	Ram Jeevan Singh	Janata Dal (United)
2004	Surajbhan Singh	Lok Janshakti Party

== See also ==
- List of constituencies of the Lok Sabha
