= Badia, Mali =

Badia
- Commune and town
- Location in Mali
- Coordinates: 12°58′14″N 9°23′54″W
- Country: Mali
- Region: Kayes Region
- Cercle: Kita Cercle

Area
  - Total: 2,306 km^{2} (890 sq mi)

Population (2009 census)
  - Total: 7,514
  - Density: 3.258/km^{2} (8.439/sq mi)
- Time zone: UTC+0 (GMT)

Badia is a rural commune in the Cercle of Kita in the Kayes Region of south-western Mali. The principal village is Daféla. In the 2009 census the commune had a population of 7,514.
