= Syed Shahabuddin =

Indian politician and diplomat (1935–2017)

Member of Parliament
- In office 1991–1996
- Preceded by: M.J. Akbar
- Succeeded by: Mohammed Taslimuddin
- In office 1985–1989
- Preceded by: Jamilur Rahman
- Succeeded by: M.J. Akbar
- Constituency: Kishanganj

Personal details
- Born: 4 November 1935 Ranchi, Bihar, India
- Died: 4 March 2017 (aged 81) Delhi, India
- Citizenship: India
- Party: Janata Party
- Spouse: Shaher Bano
- Children: Nayyar Parvez; Parveen Amanullah and 4 other daughters
- Education: Patna University
- Occupation: Politician
- Profession: Diplomat

Syed Shahabuddin (4 November 1935 – 4 March 2017) was an Indian politician and diplomat from Gaya, Bihar. He began as a diplomat working for the Indian Foreign Service, but later became well known as one of the most articulate Muslim politicians of independent India. He switched careers after the Emergency, at the time when the Congress began its decline and Hindu nationalism first started its ascent to power. He served three terms from 1979-1996 as a member of the Parliament of India. He was known for his leadership of the Muslim opposition to the Shah Bano case and the Demolition of Babri Masjid. He died in March 2017 of long-term asthma, at a hospital near his residence in Delhi, India.

== Personal life ==
Shahabuddin was born on 4 November 1935 in Ranchi, which is the current capital of the state of Jharkhand. He graduated from the Science College of the Patna University with a Physics honours degree in 1956 where he topped the matriculation exam. In the same year, Shahabuddin came first in the first part of his L.L.M. degree.

Shahabuddin married Shaher Bano on 30 May 1958 and fathered one son and five daughters. His only son, Nayyar Parvez, worked as a professor at Columbia University which is located in the United States of America. In 2005, Parvez was found dead in his hotel room. His relatives alleged that he was murdered. His daughter, Parveen Amanullah, is a social activist turned politician who in 2014 left Janata Dal (United) and joined Aam Aadmi Party.

== Career ==
=== Youth Politics ===
While studying in Patna University, Shahabuddin started an agitation for the formation of a students union in his university. The movement was successful and he was elected to the committee of the union to draft its constitution. Shahabuddin was elected as a candidate of the Communist Party of India's youth wing All India Students Federation. But, according to his contemporary, former diplomat Muchkund Dubey, Shahabuddin was not a member of the Communist Party.

In 1955, a student of B.N. College died after police fired on students who were protesting against a bus driver leading to agitations and demonstrations. To protest against this matter, Shahabuddin founded an Action Committee which passed a resolution demanding an inquiry into the killing. To pacify the protesters, the then Prime Minister of India Jawaharlal Nehru visited Patna. In response, he led 20 thousand student protesters to the Patna Airport where they waved black flags. Due to this activity, he found it difficult to get clearance to join the Indian Foreign Service. However, he received clearance due to Nehru's intervention and endorsement. Nehru wrote that his "participation in the disturbances was not politically motivated. It was an expression of his youthful exuberance." He felt that the best way to honour Shahabuddin was by recruiting him to the Foreign Service.

=== Diplomatic career ===
Syed Shahabuddin served as a diplomat, an ambassador, and a politician. His first posting, under Pandit Jawaharlal Nehru, was as Acting Consul-General in New York. He went on to serve in Rangoon, Burma, as Consul General in Jeddah, Saudi Arabia, and later as Ambassador to Venezuela and Algeria from 1969 to 1976. At the time of his premature voluntary retirement in 1978, Shahabuddin was the Joint Secretary in charge of Southeast Asia, the Indian Ocean and the Pacific in the Ministry of External Affairs, under External Affairs Minister, Atal Behari Vajpayee.

=== Political career ===
In 1978, Shahabuddin left the Indian Foreign Service through a voluntary retirement to join politics. The then Morarji Desai-led central government refused to give him a monthly pension of one thousand rupees as he did not complete 20 years in the service. According to him, the then foreign minister of India Atal Bihari Vajpayee asked him thrice to reconsider his decision. In 1979, one of the Janata Party's Member of Upper house of Parliament resigned and hence a seat became vacant. The party nominated him for the seat. In 1984, Shahabuddin lost the Rajya Sabha election to the Indian National Congress owing to alleged cross voting by the party legislators in favour of Communist Party of India. Shahabuddin wrote to party leader Karpoori Thakur saying that legislators Satya Narayan Sinha and Munishwar Singh conspired to defeat him and demanded action against them. Subsequently, Thakur sacked three legislators after Shahabuddin alleged that they had voted against him.

In 1985, Shahabuddin was elected to the Lok Sabha (the lower house of Indian parliament) as a candidate of the Janata Party. He lost the seat to M.J. Akbar of the Indian National Congress in 1989. In 1991, he was re-elected from the constituency, for which he took a helicopter from Patna to celebrate. In 1991, he again lost the election, this time to Janata Dal (United)'s Mohammed Taslimuddin.

He was known for his strong belief in the federal structure of India and his desire to see more people participating at every level of governance. He often called for persistent action against corruption, nepotism, and inefficiency, for democracy within political parties and for equitable distribution of national income and resources in order to provide a life of minimum dignity for all people. In Parliament, he was well known for his contributions to debates not only on Muslim issues but also on areas ranging widely from External Affairs and Defence to Education and Health. Looking to build support for minority rights and Muslim issues, he founded the Insaf Party in 1989, dissolved it in 1990, and later revived it.

Throughout his political career, Syed Shahabuddin was involved with many Muslim institutions and organisations, including the All-India Muslim Personal Law Board and the Babari Masjid Action Committee. From 2004 to 2011, he was the President of All- India Muslim Majlis-e-Mushawarat, an umbrella organisation of eminent Muslim individuals and organisations, headquartered in New Delhi, India. He continued to guide the organisation until his death in 2017. He created, edited, and published the monthly journal Muslim India between 1983 and 2006, as a source of reference and research on all matters of interest to Muslims in India.

==== Opposition to The Satanic Verses ====
The Satanic Verses, a novel written by Salman Rushdie became controversial in the 1990s due to the allegedly inflammatory and insulting text about Islamic prophet Muhammad, his wives and the Companions causing worldwide protests. The Indian government banned the book fearing protests from politicians and religious clerics. Shahabuddin claimed that the book was an "indecent vilification of the Holy Prophet". He also felt that the book would be rejected by any civilised society. BBC wrote that he was instrumental in getting the book banned in India. Rushdie hailed Shahabuddin and Khurshed Alam Khan extremists for opposing the book.

On 13 October 1988, Shahabuddin wrote an essay in the Times of India demanding that the book be banned. In the essay, he mentioned Article 295 of the Indian Penal Code which makes insulting religious faith a punishable offense. The book was banned after he lodged a petition claiming that the book posed a threat to public order. The local vernacular press felt that the reason behind the ban imposed by Rajiv Gandhi-led government was to appease the minority Muslim community in India. Harold Bloom wrote that Shahabuddin opposed the book to gain importance in the Indian Muslim politics.

== Social work ==
He was involved with many Muslim institutions and organizations including the All India Muslim Majlis-e-Mushawarat, of which he was the President between 2004 and 2011.

== Criticism ==
Shahabuddin received criticism for his failure to bring major changes to his 'backward' constituency of Kishanganj. He also received criticism for his open letter to Narendra Modi on 16 November 2012, regarding Muslim issues.

== Biography ==
Syed Shahabuddin: Outstanding Voice of Muslim India was compiled by Mushtaque Madni and published by P.A. Inamdar. It was released on 21 April 2013.

== Sources ==
- Bloom, Harold (2009), Salman Rushdie, Infobase Publishing, ISBN 9781438113463
