= Balia, Mali =

Balia
- Village
- Location in Mali
- Coordinates: 12°13′36″N 9°57′51″W
- Country: Mali
- Region: Kayes Region
- Cercle: Kita Cercle
- Commune: Koulou
- Elevation: 381 m (1,250 ft)
- Time zone: UTC+0 (GMT)

Balia is a village and principal settlement of the commune of Koulou in the Cercle of Kita in the Kayes Region of south-western Mali.
