= Rajnish Kumar Singh =

Indian politician

Member of Bihar Legislative Assembly
- Incumbent
- Assumed office 2025
- Preceded by: Ram Ratan Singh
- Constituency: Teghra

Member of Bihar Legislative Council
- In office 17 July 2009 – 16 July 2021
- Preceded by: Usha Sahani
- Succeeded by: Rajeev Kumar
- Constituency: Begusarai-Khagaria Local Authorities

Personal details
- Born: 5 March 1973 (age 53) Itwa, Begusarai district, Bihar, India
- Party: Bharatiya Janata Party
- Children: 2 sons
- Education: B.Sc. (Chemistry), AICW, FCA
- Occupation: Politician, Chartered Accountant

Rajnish Kumar Singh (born 5 March 1973) is an Indian politician and Chartered Accountant from Bihar. He is a Member of the Bihar Legislative Council representing the Bharatiya Janata Party. Known for his association with the Rashtriya Swayamsevak Sangh (RSS) since childhood, he has been active in social service, youth mobilization, and party organization in the Begusarai district.

== Early life and education ==
Rajish Kumar Singh was born on 5 March 1973 in Itwa village, Begusarai district, Bihar. He is the son of Shri Yogendra Singh. He completed a Bachelor of Science (B.Sc.) degree in Chemistry and later qualified as a Fellow Chartered Accountant (FCA) and Associate Member of the Institute of Cost and Works Accountants (AICW).

He was deeply influenced by the values and ideology of the Rashtriya Swayamsevak Sangh (RSS) from an early age, regularly attending RSS branches throughout his education. He is married and has two sons.

== Political and social career ==
Rajnish Kumar Singh entered politics in 2006 with the spirit of social service and public engagement. That year, he was elected by a large margin to the Begusarai District Council from Constituency No. 5 (Bhagwanpur Block).

In 2008, he served as the District President of the BJP Panchayati Raj Manch, where he worked to strengthen the party's grassroots presence and build connections with three-tier Panchayat representatives. He conducted district-wide programs to inform local leaders about the policies of the BJP–JD(U) government and their rights and duties as representatives.

In 2009, with the support of Panchayat representatives from Begusarai and Khagaria, he was elected as a Member of the Bihar Legislative Council. Since 2010, he has been serving as the State General Secretary of the Bharatiya Janata Party, Bihar.

He has also been a member of the Implementation Committee and the Committee on Reports, Papers and Documents Laid on the Council Table in the Bihar Legislative Council.

== Personal life ==
Rajnish Kumar Singh is married and has two sons.

== See also ==
- Bihar Legislative Council
- Bharatiya Janata Party, Bihar
- Rashtriya Swayamsevak Sangh
