= Ram Ratan Singh =

Indian politician

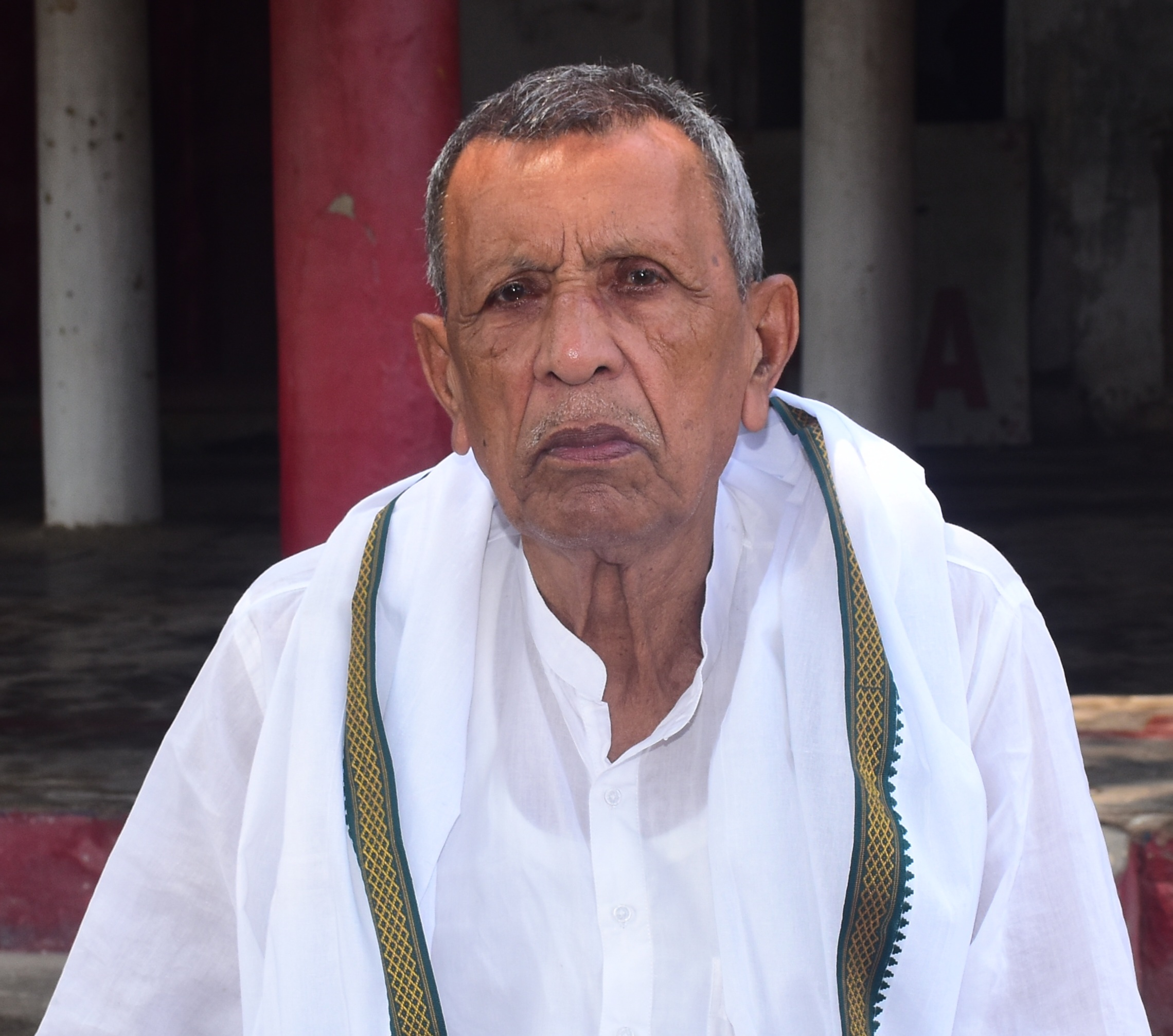

Member of Bihar Legislative Assembly
- In office 2020–2025
- Preceded by: Birendra Kumar
- Succeeded by: Rajnish Kumar Singh
- Constituency: Teghra

Personal details
- Party: Communist Party of India
- Education: Bhagalpur University
- Profession: Politician

Ram Ratan Singh is an Indian politician and leader of Communist Party of India from Bihar and a former Member of the Bihar Legislative Assembly. He belongs to Bihat village of Begusarai district. He won the Teghra Assembly constituency in the 2020 Bihar Legislative Assembly election.
