= Insaaf =

Insaaf (lit. 'justice') may refer to:

- Insaaf (1937 film), a Bollywood film of 1937
- Insaaf (1946 film), starring David Abraham Cheulkar
- Insaaf (1956 film), a Bollywood film of 1956
- Insaaf (1960 film), a Pakistani film of 1960
- Insaaf (1966 film), a Bollywood film of 1966
- Insaaf (1973 film), 1973 Indian film
- Insaaf (1987 film), 1987 Indian film
- Insaaf (1997 film), 1997 Indian film by Dayal Nihalani
- Insaaf (2011 film), a 2011 Maldivian film
- Insaaf (2025 film), a 2025 Bangladeshi film
- Insaaf: The Justice, a 2004 Indian film

== See also ==
- Insaf (disambiguation)
