= Kanhaiya Kumar =

Indian political activist and politician (born 1987)

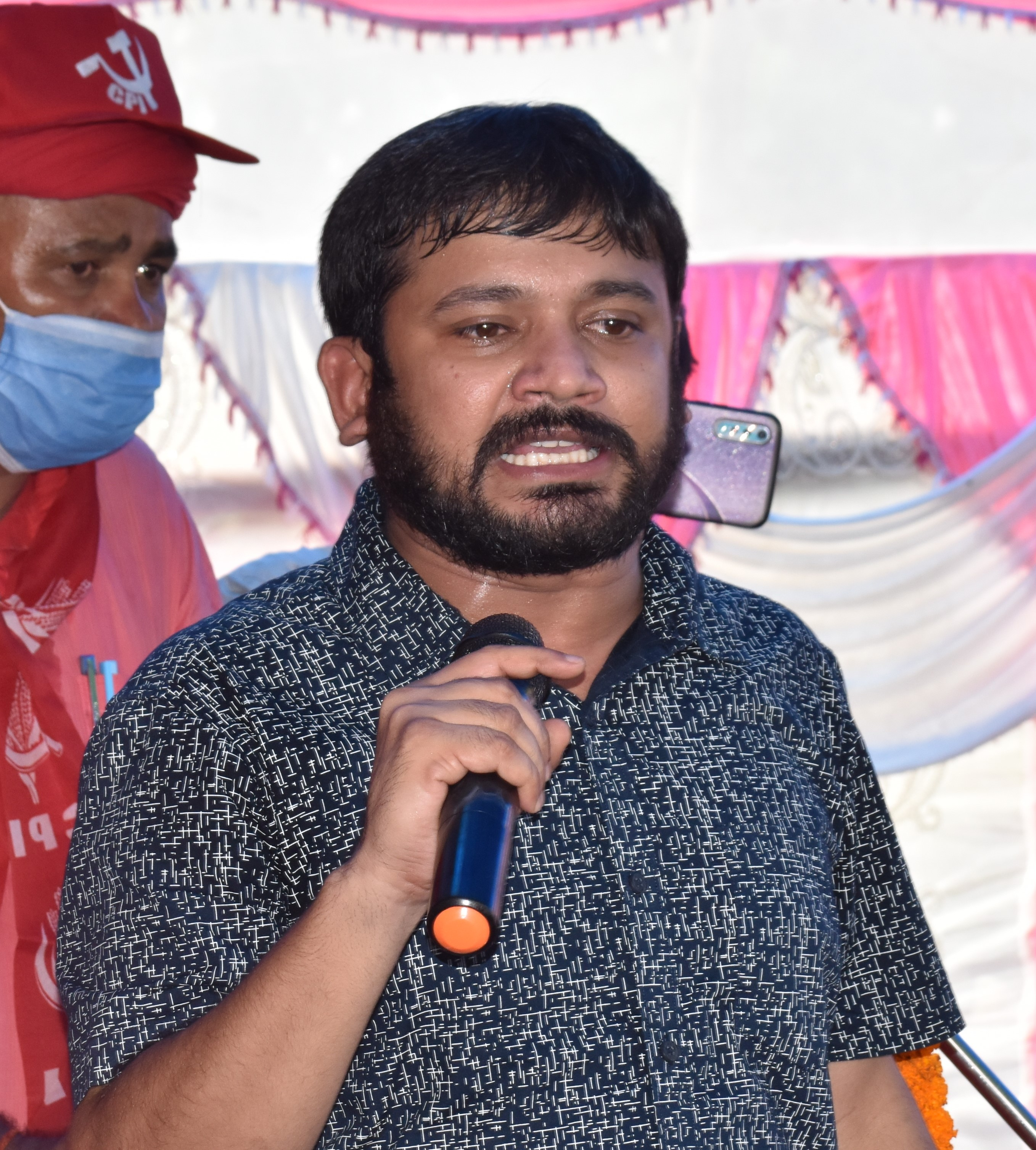

AICC Incharge of the National Students' Union of India
- Incumbent
- Assumed office 6 July 2023
- President: Neeraj Kundan

Personal details
- Born: January 1987 (age 39)
- Party: Indian National Congress (2021–present)
- Other political affiliations: Communist Party of India (2016–2021)
- Education: College of Commerce, Arts and Science, Patna (BA); Nalanda Open University (MA); Jawaharlal Nehru University (PhD)

Kanhaiya Kumar (born January 1987) is an Indian political activist who served as the president of the Jawaharlal Nehru University Students' Union and leader of the All India Students Federation (AISF). He served as National Executive Council member of Communist Party of India. He joined Indian National Congress on 28 September 2021 and has been appointed as the AICC in-charge of the National Student's Union of India.

== Early life and education ==
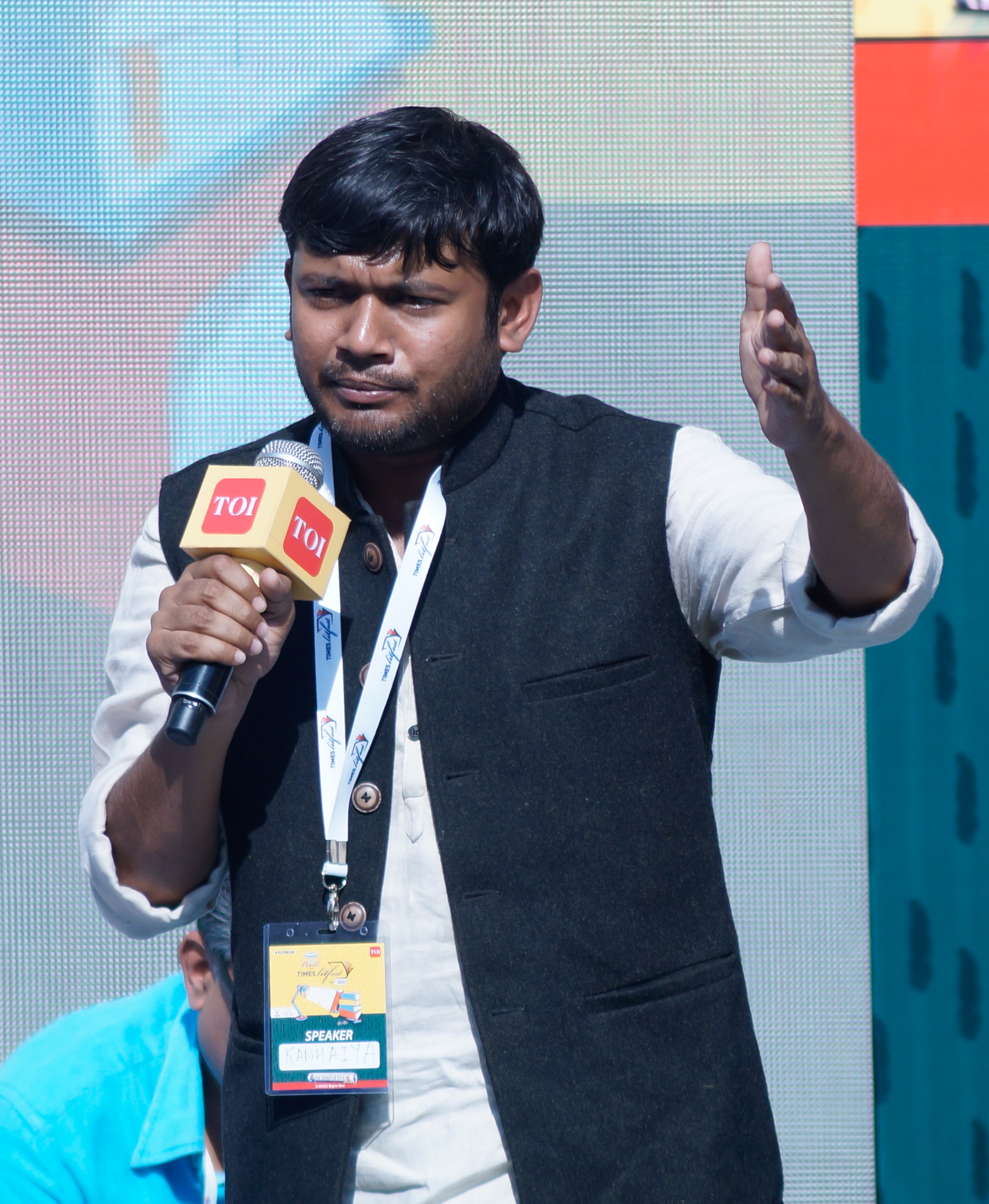
Kanhaiya Kumar at a Times of India (media) event (2016)

Kanhaiya Kumar was born in January 1987, and brought up in the village of Bihat at Barauni in Begusarai district, Bihar. The village is part of the Teghra constituency, known to be a stronghold of the CPI. Kumar's father is Jaishankar Singh who is paralysed. His mother, Meena Devi is an Anganwadi worker. He has an elder brother, Manikant, who works as a supervisor with a company in Assam. His family members have traditionally been supporters of the CPI.

Kanhaiya Kumar studied till Class VI at Madhya Vidyalaya, Masnadpur, before joining R. K. C. High School in Barauni. During his school days, Kumar took part in several plays and activities organised by IPTA (Indian People's Theatre Association), a left-leaning cultural group going back to the days of India's freedom struggle. He cleared his Class X board exams in 2002 with a first division. After school, Kumar joined the Ram Ratan Singh College at Mokama, taking up science in Class XI-XII. He then graduated with a degree in geography from the College of Commerce, Arts and Science, Patna in 2007, earning a "first-class".

== Political career ==
While at the College of Commerce, Arts and Science, Patna, Kumar began getting involved in student politics. He joined the AISF, and a year later was selected as a delegate at its conference in Patna. After completing his post graduation with an MA in sociology from Nalanda Open University in Patna, again securing a first class, he moved to Delhi and after ranking first in the entrance exam in 2011, joined Jawaharlal Nehru University where he pursued a PhD in African studies at the School of International Studies. He completed his PhD in February 2019, titled The Process of Decolonisation and Social Transformation in South Africa, 1994–2015.

In September 2015, Kumar became president of the JNU Students' Union, representing the AISF.

In March 2016, Kumar stated in an interview, "the first inspiration who made me want to join politics was Bhagat Singh. Then the path continued into Ambedkar, Gandhi and Marx, and also to Birsa Munda and Jyotirao Phule...."

Kumar's autobiography, Bihar to Tihar: My Political Journey was published in October 2016. The book describes his life from his childhood days to his political involvement in Delhi.

On 29 April 2018, he was elected to the party national council of the Communist Party of India (CPI). Later in 2019, he was inducted into CPI national executive council.

=== 2019 Lok Sabha elections ===
Kumar contested from Begusarai on Communist Party of India's ticket for the 2019 Indian general election. He lost the election, polling a total of 269,976 votes and 22.03% of vote share. He secured a distant second position after losing to Giriraj Singh of Bharatiya Janata Party by 422,217 votes. About his defeat, he told Aaj Tak in an interview, "I didn't have anything directly to lose in these elections. I got support from the people for fighting against a big, rich and influential machinery and this is a message from democracy that a son of an Anganwadi worker can contest elections."

== Electoral record ==
Elections	Constituency	Party	Result	Vote share	Opposing Candidate(s)	Opposing Party (s)	Vote share
2019 Indian general election	Begusarai	CPI	Lost	22.02%	Giriraj Singh	BJP	57.01%
2024 Indian general election	North East Delhi	INC	Lost	44.16%	Manoj Tiwari	BJP	53.1%

== Reception ==
Kanhaiya Kumar became widely known due to a speech with slogans for Azadi in Jawaharlal Nehru University which was raised henceworth by him and other students at multiple student protests against the policies of the government and sometimes in modified forms in JNU and education related issues; it was used especially during protests between 2019 and 2020.

In the slogan he demands Azadi from starvation, cronyism, casteism, communalism and sanghwads referring to the Sangh Parivar, and demands the Azadi of Bhagat Singh, Ambedkar, Phule and Birsa Munda, ending with Inquilab Zindabad. The slogans in the later renditions also attach the names of various political activists, journalists and academics who are imprisoned on sedition and other changes for long durations, sometimes for years without a trial.

The Bharatiya Janata Party and its linked students union the Akhil Bharatiya Vidyarthi Parishad have tried to frame the slogans as anti-national and seditious. Videos of the sloganeering were also spread through various news broadcasts like that of Zee News and Arnab Goswami at Times Now and later Republic TV which brought national attention to it and lifted Kanhaiya Kumar into mainstream limelight but the content was altered. The news broadcasts depicted sloganeering of "Bharat tere tukde tukde honge" and caused widespread outrage. The term "tukde tukde gang" was coined from here and used extensively by BJP since then.

Forensic experts on later analyzing the videos said that they were doctored with a different voice-over overlaid on an original video. The videos were never admitted as evidence in court.

=== Police action and acquittal ===
In February 2016, Kanhaiya Kumar was arrested by the Delhi Police over the charges of sedition in an event at the JNU campus. It was organised by JNU students to commemorate the second anniversary of the hanging of Parliament attack convict Afzal Guru. Kumar denied shouting any slogans against integrity of the country. Kumar's arrest drew sharp reactions from opposition parties, teachers, students and academics. Students at JNU went on strike to protest his arrest.

Kumar was assaulted on multiple occasions when brought to the Patiala House court for hearings regarding the matter. A Supreme Court-appointed panel later confirmed that the policemen present at the Court were responsible for the security lapses.

On 2 March 2016, Kumar was granted interim bail for 6 months by the Delhi High Court, conditional on an undertaking that he would not "participate in any anti-national activity." Justice Pratibha Rani noted that there were no recordings of Kumar participating in anti-national slogans. A separate magisterial investigation appointed by the Delhi Government concluded that it did not find any evidence of Kumar participating in anti-national slogans.

Following his release from jail, Kumar faced death threats. A leader of the BJP's youth wing offered ₹5 lakh as a reward to anyone who cut off Kumar's tongue. Posters were put up in New Delhi offering ₹11 lakh as a reward to anyone who killed Kumar. The court later acquitted him of any charge because it was found that he wasn't present in the campus at the time the police tried to establish that the alleged slogans were said to have been made by him.

=== Speech on campus ===
On 3 March 2016, Kanhaiya Kumar gave a speech to a packed auditorium in the JNU campus, during which he said he was seeking, not freedom from India, but freedom within India. He appealed to his fellow students to free the nation from the clutches of the Rashtriya Swayamsevak Sangh, which, he stated, was trying to divide the nation. Referring to the Akhil Bharatiya Vidyarthi Parishad, he called them his "opposition", not his enemy. He urged his supporters to keep raising the slogans of Azadi (freedom). The speech won accolades from the leaders of non-BJP parties as well as independent commentators. Shashi Tharoor commented that it turned Kumar into a "nationwide political star," and congratulated BJP for creating this phenomenon. Some people also expressed concern that his speech did not address "the graveness of alleged anti-national slogans" shouted at JNU and what he did to stop them.

|date=11 March 2016|title=Kanhaiya Kumar was fined by JNU for alleged 'misbehaviour' with girl student|url=https://www.dnaindia.com/india/report-kanhaiya-kumar-was-fined-by-jnu-for-alleged-misbehaviour-with-girl-student-2187880|website=DNA India}}</ref>[54] Kumar had allegedly been urinating in the open in June 2015 and became abusive and threatened the female student who objected against his behaviour. The AISF stated that the case was an attempt to defame Kumar.[55][56][57]

On 10 March 2016, Kumar was manhandled and abused on the JNU campus by a man who accused him of being a deshdrohi (transl. traitor to the nation). This incident came two days after Kumar made a speech on International Women's Day, during which he accused security personnel for raping woman in Kashmir. However, while addressing students later in the day, Kumar said such incidents couldn't scare him.

On 28 March 2016, Uttar Pradesh Navnirman Sena threatened to storm the JNU campus and gun down Kumar and Umar Khalid unless the two left Delhi by 31 March.

In March 2016, while addressing "Jashn-e-Azaadi" event at JNU, Kanhaiya contrasted the 1984 anti-Sikh riots with 2002 Gujarat riots, calling the former a "mob-led massacre" and latter "state sponsored violence". The remark drew criticism from across the political spectrum. The ABVP stages a protest at Delhi University accusing Kumar of giving Congress a "clean chit" for killings in which thousands of Sikhs died, and demanded his apology. Sucheta De and Shehla Rashid rejected any such distinction between the two riots, warning that contrasting them undermined 1984 victims and their fight for justice. Kumar said he had been "misinterpreted and misrepresented" but surviving recording confirmed he had drawn the mob-versus state distinction. CPI(ML) member Kavita Krishnan said he would have done better to admit error than claim misrepresentation. Commentators also noted his claim that student wing AISF opposed the Emergency throughout was also partly true because AISF initially back it before it turned critical of Emergency.

On 29 March 2019, Kumar who was contesting the Lok Sabha polls as a CPI candidate was booked for violation for model code of conduct of elections.--->

== Publications ==
Books

- Bihar To Tihar: My Political Journey

Papers

- The Process of De-colonisation and Social Transformation in South Africa, 1994-2015

== See also ==
- Umar Khalid
- Shehla Rashid Shora - Vice-president of JNUSU when Kumar was president of the organisation.
- Chandrashekhar Prasad
