= Insaf Party =

Insaf Party (Justice Party), was a Muslim political party founded by Syed Shahabuddin in 1989. It was formed as a split from the Janata Party, as a protest against the tie-up between V.P. Singh and Bharatiya Janata Party. When the V.P. Singh government fell in 1990, the Insaf Party was dissolved.

Syed Shahabuddin later revived the party, although it appears to have been disbanded again.
