= College of Commerce, Arts and Science, Patna =

College in Patna, India

College of Commerce, Arts & Science
- Former name: College of Commerce
- Type: Coeducational College
- Established: 1949 (77 years ago)
- Founder: Pt. Indu Shekhar Jha
- Affiliations: NAAC ('A' Grade)
- Academic affiliations: Patliputra University
- Principal: Prof. Indrajit Prasad Roy
- Location: Opp. Rajendra Nagar Terminal, Main Road, Kankarbagh,, Patna, Bihar, 800020; 25.6017°N 85.1623°E
- Campus: Urban
- Accreditation: NAAC Grade A
- Website: cocaspatna.ac.in

College of Commerce, Arts & Science, Patna (est. 1949) also known as COCAS is a constituent unit of Patliputra University (earlier it was a unit of Magadh University). It has been re-accredited by NAAC with 'A' grade, receiving 3.10/4 CGPA. It is one of the oldest college of Patna. The college offers undergraduate and postgraduate courses in the fields of science, commerce and the arts.

== Campus ==
The campus of the College of Commerce, Arts and Science is located in Patna, Bihar, India, and houses various academic departments, administrative offices, and student activity centers.

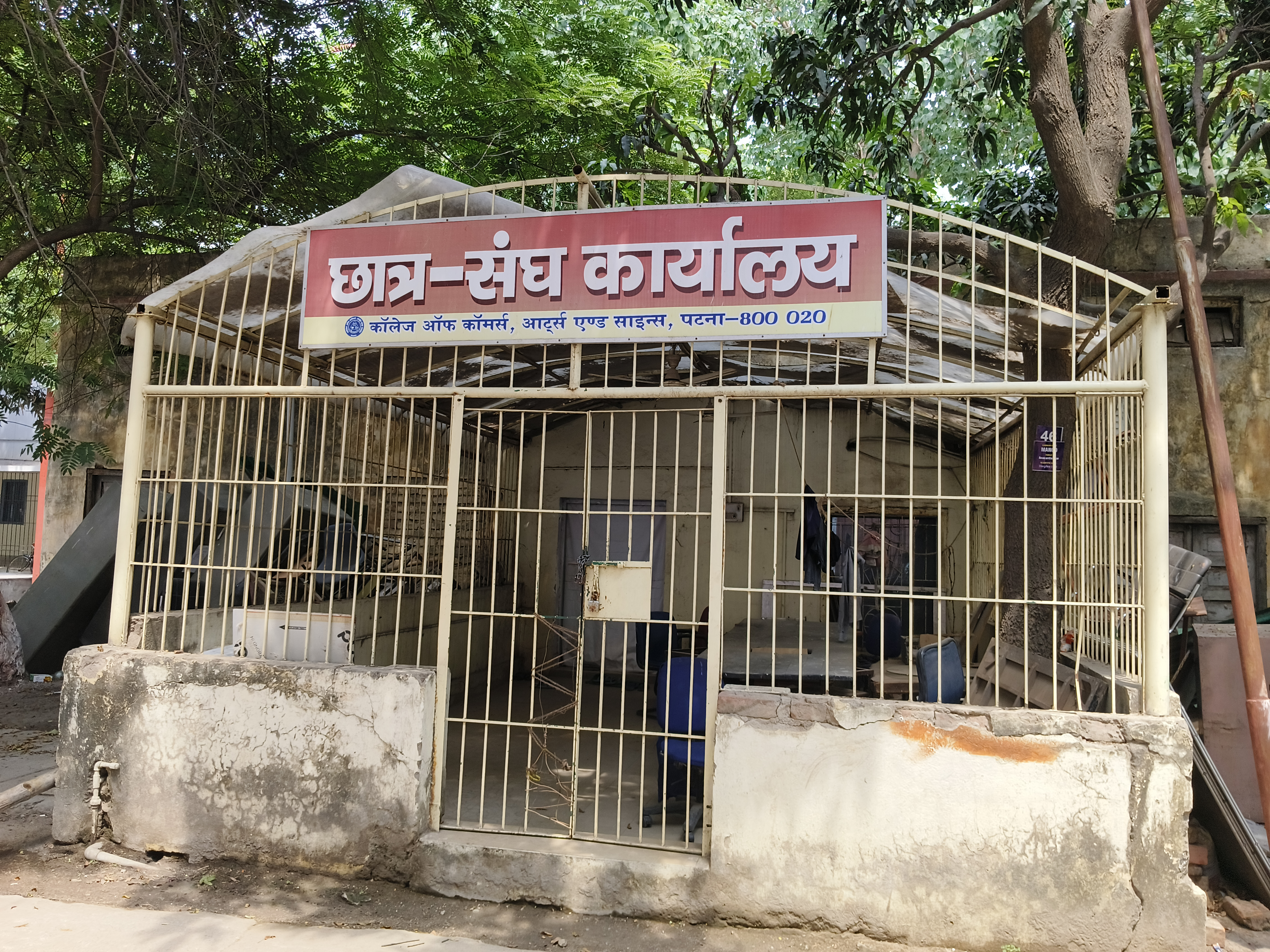
Students' Union Office, College of Commerce, Arts and Science

The Students' Union Office (छात्र संघ कार्यालय) is a notable facility on the campus where student union activities, meetings, and events are organized.

== History ==
College of Commerce, Arts and Science was established in 1949 by Pt. Indu Shekhar Jha on the advice of Rajendra Prasad, the first president of India, to impart quality education in the field of commerce and management in the state. The institution added the faculty of Science in 1957 followed by Arts in 1960 and Law in 1963. In 2016, the name 'College of Commerce, Patna' was changed to 'College of Commerce, Arts & Science'. The proposal for change of name from College of Commerce to College of Commerce, Arts and Science was done on the recommendation given by NAAC Peer Team in 2009. Consequent upon the recommendation by the NAAC Peer team the College Executive Committee in its Meeting in 2013 proposed and passed the recommendations for change of name of the college under the chairmanship of then Principal Prof. (Dr.) P.K.Verma
