= Bougaribaya =

- Commune and village
- Location in Mali
- Coordinates: 12°49′0″N 9°50′37″W
- Country: Mali
- Region: Kayes Region
- Cercle: Kita Cercle

Population (2009 census)
  - Total: 10,251
- Time zone: UTC+0 (GMT)

Bougaribaya is a village and rural commune in the Cercle of Kita in the Kayes Region of south-western Mali. The commune includes 7 villages and in the 2009 census had a population of 10,251.
