= Sirakoro, Mali =

Sirakoro
- Commune and village
- Location in Mali
- Coordinates: 12°41′0″N 9°13′45″W
- Country: Mali
- Region: Kayes Region
- Cercle: Kita Cercle

Population (2009 census)
  - Total: 10,325
- Time zone: UTC+0 (GMT)

Sirakoro is a village and rural commune in the Cercle of Kita in the Kayes Region of south-western Mali. The commune contains 10 villages and in the 2009 census had a population of 10,325.

== Notable people ==
- Moussa Léo Sidibé
