= Koulou =

- Commune
- Location in Mali
- Coordinates: 12°13′36″N 9°57′51″W
- Country: Mali
- Region: Kayes Region
- Cercle: Kita Cercle

Area
  - Total: 2,098 km^{2} (810 sq mi)

Population (2009 census)
  - Total: 10,416
  - Density: 4.965/km^{2} (12.86/sq mi)
- Time zone: UTC+0 (GMT)

Koulou is a rural commune in the Cercle of Kita in the Kayes Region of south-western Mali. The commune contains 8 villages and in the census of 2009 had a population of 10,416. The principal village (chef-lieu) is Balia.
