= Benjamin Oloruntimehin =

Nigerian Africanist and historian

Benjamin Olatunji Oloruntimehin (1939 – December 18, 2020) was a Nigerian Africanist and historian.

== Biography ==
Oloruntimehin acquired a bachelor's degree in History at the University of Ibadan in 1963 and a doctorate in History at the same university three years later, in 1966. He began teaching at the university before getting tenure at the University of Ife (Obafemi Awolowo University as of 2026) in the late 1960's. He worked in what was then the Institute of African Studies. He served as the Dean of the Faculty of Arts at Ife from 1975 to 1977. He served the university until 1990, retiring from lecturing at the age of 51.

His publications included eight books and monographs, ten edited books, 15 book contributions, 30 journal articles and 14 book reviews.

He was married to Beatrice Olufunmilayo Oloruntimehin, a sociologist who also worked at the University of Ife. She died in 2025.

He died on Friday, December 18, 2020, at the age of 81.

== Selected publications ==
- Oloruntimehin, Benjamin Olatunji (1981). "Francophonie and Subordinate State System in the African region". Outre-Mers. Revue d'histoire: 195-203.
- Oloruntimehin, Benjamin Olatunji (1968). "Résistance Movements in the Tukulor Empire". Cahiers d'études africaines. 8 (29).
- Oloruntimehin, Benjamin Olatunji (1972). The Segu Tukulor Empire. London: Longman.

== Sources ==
- Amusa, Saheed; Adesoji, Abimbola (2022). "Historical Scholarship and Training at Ife: Growth, Personalities, and Professorships, 1962–2022". History in Africa. 49: 331–347. doi:10.1017/hia.2022.5.
- "Governor Fayemi mourns renowned Historian, Prof. Oloruntimehin". Government of Ekiti State. Nigeria. December 20, 2020. Archived from the original on February 26, 2024.
- Olaniyi, Olufemi (January 21, 2021). "Oloruntimehin distinct in academics, administration – Fayemi, OAU VC". PUNCH. Nigeria. Archived from the original on March 5, 2021.
- Olupons, Jacob (January 2021). "Farewell Benjamin Oloruntimehin". This Day Live. Nigeria. Archived from the original on April 13, 2026.
- Onanuga, Bayo (April 24, 2025). "President Tinubu Condoles with the Oloruntimehin Family over the Passing of Professor Beatrice Olufunmilayo Oloruntimehin". State House. Nigeria.
