= Sébékoro =

- Commune and town
- Location in Mali
- Coordinates: 12°57′45″N 8°59′15″W
- Country: Mali
- Region: Kayes Region
- Cercle: Kita Cercle

Area
  - Total: 1,522 km^{2} (588 sq mi)

Population (2009 census)
  - Total: 39,030
  - Density: 25.64/km^{2} (66.42/sq mi)
- Time zone: UTC+0 (GMT)

Sébékoro is a small town and a rural commune in the Cercle of Kita in the Kayes Region of south-western Mali. The commune includes the town and 15 villages. In the 2009 census the commune had a population of 39,030.
