= Gadougou II =

- Commune
- Location in Mali
- Coordinates: 12°35′5″N 9°30′12″W
- Country: Mali
- Region: Kayes Region
- Cercle: Kita Cercle

Population (2009 census)
  - Total: 9,115
- Time zone: UTC+0 (GMT)

Gadougou II is a rural commune in the Cercle of Kita in the Kayes Region of south-western Mali. The commune includes 6 villages and in the 2009 census had a population of 9,115. The principal village is Gallé.
