= Manju Verma =

Former cabinet minister in Government of Bihar

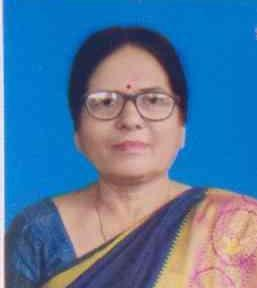

Member of Bihar Legislative Assembly
- Preceded by: Anil Choudhary
- Constituency: Cheria-Bariarpur
- In office 2010–2015
- In office 2015–2020

Personal details
- Party: Janata Dal United
- Spouse: Chandrashekhar Verma
- Relatives: Sukhdeo Mahto (father-in-law)

Manju Verma is an Indian politician and former Member of Bihar Legislative Assembly. She was the Minister of Social Welfare in the Bihar Cabinet.

== Early life ==
Verma belongs to Kushwaha or the Koeri caste. As per her affidavit submitted to Election Commission of India, she has pursued education up to intermediate level and her husband has been an agriculturist. She is the daughter-in-law of veteran Communist Party of India leader Sukhdeo Mahto.

== Political career ==
Manju Verma has been an MLA from Cheria-Bariarpur constituency twice which falls under Begusarai Lok Sabha constituency. The seat she represents was earlier also represented by her father-in-law who was a member of Communist Party of India, while her husband is also a leader of Janata Dal (United) to which she belonged earlier. Verma has been an MLA in 2010 as well as 2015.In 2015, she was the only female member of Nitish Kumar's cabinet where she was given the portfolio of social justice ministry.

Verma was expelled from JD(U) after the notorious Muzaffarpur shelter case in which she was allegedly involved. The maintenance of shelter home in which minor girls were kept was under the charge of her ministry. Later, she and her husband were also booked under "arms act", when CBI raid took place upon their ancestral house in connection with the "shelter case" which involved sexual abuse against destitute minor girls. The police however failed to arrest her after the case was lodged and the owner of shelter home, Brajesh Thakur was arrested. After three months, she surrendered into the court and accused JD(U) and Nitish Kumar of targeting her.

In March 2019, Patna High Court granted bail to her in both the cases while her husband remained lodged in the jail. After Verma's resignation as the social welfare minister in connection with the case, Krishnandan Verma, the education minister in Nitish's 6th cabinet was allocated additional charge of social welfare ministry. During her trial Manju Verma had claimed that, she has been harassed because of her caste, thus allocation of her ministry to Krishnandan Verma was taken as a moderation attempt by the JD(U) leadership. In 2018, in an interview with The Telegraph, Verma claimed her husband to be innocent. According to her, she visited the shelter home only once with her husband on the occasion of a programme when she saw the girls cooking in their dirty clothes, but they refused to tell anything on enquiry.

In the 2020 Bihar Assembly Elections, the Janata Dal (United) party from which Verma had resigned earlier following the cases of alleged involvement of her husband in Muzaffarpur Shelter home case again made her the party candidate to Bihar Assembly from the Cheria-Bariarpur constituency.

Verma was defeated in this election by Raj Banshi Mahto of Rashtriya Janata Dal, a former Member of Parliament.

== See also ==
- Renu Kushawaha
