= Balia, Bangladesh =

Balia, Bangladesh may refer to the following locations in Bangladesh:

- Bālia, also called Balya and Ballya, at 25°09′N 89°18′E
- Bālia, at 24°58′N 90°34′E
- Bālia, at 24°58′N 90°28′E
- Bālia, at 24°44′N 89°51′E
- Bālia, at 24°34′N 88°52′E
- Bālia, at 24°23′N 88°33′E
- Bālia, at 24°16′N 90°02′E
- Bālia, at 24°01′N 90°05′E
- Bālia, at 23°36′N 90°31′E
- Balia, Chittagong Division, at 23°11′N 90°40′E
- Bālia, at 23°10′N 89°01′E
- Bālia, at 23°08′N 90°08′E
- Balia, Barisal District, at 22°52′N 90°35′E
- Bālia, at 22°35′N 90°38′E
- Balia, at 26°07′N 88°34′E
- Balia, at 23°16′N 90°53′E
- Bali, also called Balia, at 25°00′N 90°58′E
