= Barauni Assembly constituency =

Legislative assembly constituency in Bihar, India

Coordinates: 25.47°N 85.99°E

Barauni
- Former constituency for the Bihar Legislative Assembly

Constituency details
- Country: India
- Region: East India
- State: Bihar
- District: Begusarai
- Lok Sabha constituency: Balia
- Established: 1972
- Abolished: 2010
- Reservation: None

Barauni was an assembly constituency in Begusarai district in the Indian state of Bihar.

As a consequence of the orders of the Delimitation Commission of India, Ballia Assembly constituency ceased to exist in 2010. It is now renamed as Teghra Teghra Assembly constituency.

It was part of Balia Lok Sabha constituency.

== Results ==
Election Year	Member	Party
1972	Chandra Sekhar Singh	Communist Party of India
1977	Suryanarayan Singh	Communist Party of India
1980	Rameshwar Singh	Communist Party of India
1985	Shakuntala Sinha	Communist Party of India
1990	Shivdani Singh	Communist Party of India
1995	Rajendra Prasad Singh	Communist Party of India
2000	Rajendra Prasad Singh	Communist Party of India
2005 (Feb and Oct)	Rajendra Prasad Singh	Communist Party of India

=== 1977-2005 ===
In the October 2005 Bihar Assembly elections, Rajendra Prasad Singh of CPI won the Barauni seat defeating his nearest rival Surendra Mehta of BJP. Contests in most years were multi cornered but only winners and runners are being mentioned. Rajendra Prasad Singh of CPI defeated Pradip Rai of LJP in February 2005, Ram Lakhan Singh of BJP in 2000 and 1995. Shivdani Singh of CPI defeated Kamla Devi of Congress in 1990. Shakuntala Sinha of CPI defeated Kamla Devi of Congress in 1985. Rameshwar Singh of CPI defeated Sidhweshar Prasad Singh of Congress (I) in 1980. Suryanarayan Singh of CPI defeated Kapil Dev Singh of Janata Party in 1977.
