= Kokofata =

- Commune and village
- Location in Mali
- Coordinates: 12°52′57″N 9°56′45″W
- Country: Mali
- Region: Kayes Region
- Cercle: Kita Cercle

Population (2009 census)
  - Total: 21,117
- Time zone: UTC+0 (GMT)

Kokofata is a village and rural commune in the Cercle of Kita in the Kayes Region of south-western Mali. The commune includes 17 villages and in the 2009 census had a population of 21,117.
