= Shreenarayan Yadav =

Indian politician (1934 or 1935 – 2024)

Shri Narayan Yadav

Bihar Legislative Assembly
- Incumbent
- Assumed office 1977–2020
- Preceded by: Satanand Sambuddha
- Constituency: Sahebpur Kamal

Personal details
- Born: 1934 or 1935 Kharhat, Begusarai, Bihar and Orissa Province, British India
- Died: 12 November 2024 (aged 88–89)
- Party: Rashtriya Janata Dal
- Parent: Bhujangi Prasad Yadav
- Education: Master of Arts
- Occupation: Farmer
- Profession: Politician

Shri Narayan Yadav (1934 or 1935 – 12 November 2024) was an Indian politician, member of Bihar Legislative Assembly of India and former Cabinet Urban Development Minister of Bihar in Lalu Yadav and Rabri Devi ministry. He represented the Sahebpur Kamal constituency in Begusarai district of Bihar. He defeated Md. Aslam of LJP in 2015, In October 2010, Bihar Assembly elections, Yadav won the Ballia seat defeating his nearest rival Jamshed Ashraf of Janata Dal United. Yadav has won this constituency nine times. Yadav defeated Jamshed Ashraf of LJP in October 2005 and in February 2005, Md. Tanweer Hasan of JD(U) in 2000, Krishna Mohan Yadav an Independent in 1995, Samsu Joha of Congress in 1990, Samsu Joha of Congress in 1985, Chandrabhanu Devi of Congress (I) in 1980 and Ram Lakhan Yadav of Congress in 1977. He died on 12 November 2024.
