= Raj Banshi Mahto =

Indian politician

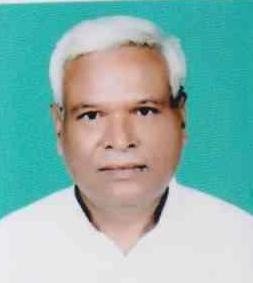

Member of Parliament, Lok Sabha
- In office 1998–1999
- Preceded by: Shatrughan Prasad Singh
- Succeeded by: Ram Jeevan Singh
- Constituency: Balia, Bihar

Personal details
- Born: 10 September 1955 (age 70) Basahi, Begusarai district, Bihar
- Party: Rashtriya Janata Dal
- Other political affiliations: Janata Dal
- Spouse: Sushila Devi

Raj Banshi Mahto is an Indian politician. He is currently member of Bihar Assembly from Cheriya Bariyapur Vidhan Sabha. He was elected to the Lok Sabha, the lower house of the Parliament of India from the Balia in Bihar as a member of the Rashtriya Janata Dal.

Mahto belongs to Kushwaha caste of Bihar and in his early political career, he has worked for elimination of caste based discrimination in his native village.

In 2022, he was made the chief whip of the ruling Rashtriya Janata Dal. He defeated former social welfare minister Manju Verma with a margin of 40,000 votes to win the Bihar Legislative Assembly election in 2020, becoming the MLA for the first time.
