= Teghra Assembly constituency =

Coordinates: 25°29′31″N 85°56′19″E

Teghra
- Constituency No. 143 for the Bihar Legislative Assembly

Constituency details
- Country: India
- Region: East India
- State: Bihar
- District: Begusarai
- Lok Sabha constituency: Begusarai
- Established: 1951
- Total electors: 302,549
- Reservation: None

Member of Legislative Assembly
- 18th Bihar Legislative Assembly
- Incumbent Rajnish Kumar Singh
- Party: BJP
- Alliance: NDA
- Elected year: 2025

Teghra is an assembly constituency in Begusarai district in the Indian state of Bihar. It was earlier called Barauni Assembly constituency.

== Overview ==
As per Delimitation of Parliamentary and Assembly constituencies Order, 2008, No. 143 Teghra Assembly constituency is composed of the following:

- Teghra community development block;
- Bihat I to IV, Malhipur (North), Malhipur (South), Papraur, Garahara I & II,
- Simaria I & II, Rajwara, Amarpur, Peepra Dewas and Hajipur gram panchayats of Barauni CD Block.

Teghra Assembly constituency is part of No. 24 Begusarai (Lok Sabha constituency).

== Members of the Legislative Assembly ==
| Year | Name | Party |
|---|---|---|
| 1952 | Ram Charitra Singh | Indian National Congress |
| 1957 | Ram Charitra Singh | Indian National Congress |
| 1962 | Chandrasekhar Singh | Communist Party of India |
1967-2008: See Barauni
| 2010 | Lalan Kumar | Bharatiya Janata Party |
| 2015 | Birendra Kumar | Rashtriya Janata Dal |
| 2020 | Ram Ratan Singh | Communist Party of India |
| 2025 | Rajnish Kumar Singh | Bharatiya Janata Party |

== Election results ==
=== 2025 ===
2025 Bihar Legislative Assembly election: Teghra
| Party | Candidate | Votes | % | ±% |
|---|---|---|---|---|
| BJP | Rajnish Kumar Singh | 112,770 | 53.04 | |
| CPI | Ram Ratan Singh | 77,406 | 36.4 | −13.4 |
| JSP | Ram Nandan Singh | 8,442 | 3.97 | |
| Independent | Sudha Bharti | 3,169 | 1.49 | |
| NOTA | None of the above | 2,021 | 0.95 | −1.22 |
| Majority | | 35,364 | 16.64 | −11.39 |
| Turnout | | 212,629 | 70.28 | +10.28 |
| BJP gain from CPI | | Swing | 16.64 | |

=== 2020 ===
2020 Bihar Legislative Assembly election: Teghra
| Party | Candidate | Votes | % | ±% |
|---|---|---|---|---|
| CPI | Ram Ratan Singh | 85,229 | 49.8 | +33.65 |
| JD(U) | Birendra Kumar | 37,250 | 21.77 | |
| LJP | Lalan Kumar | 29,936 | 17.49 | |
| Independent | Chandan Mahato | 3,945 | 2.31 | |
| Independent | Sanjiv Kumar Bharti | 3,927 | 2.29 | |
| JAP(L) | Shri Ram Rai | 1,582 | 0.92 | |
| NOTA | None of the above | 3,718 | 2.17 | +0.42 |
| Majority | | 47,979 | 28.03 | +18.26 |
| Turnout | | 171,126 | 60.0 | +0.55 |
| CPI gain from RJD | | Swing | 28.03 | |

=== 2015 ===
Bihar Assembly election, 2015: Teghra
| Party | Candidate | Votes | % | ±% |
|---|---|---|---|---|
| RJD | Birendra Kumar Mahto | 68,975 | 43.16 | |
| BJP | Ram Lakhan Singh | 53,364 | 33.39 | |
| CPI | Ram Ratan Singh | 25,818 | 16.15 | |
| Independent | Sanjeev Kumar Bharti | 4,413 | 2.76 | |
| Independent | Deepak Kumar Singh | 1,946 | 1.22 | |
| NOTA | None of the above | 2,804 | 1.75 | |
| Majority | | 15,611 | 9.77 | |
| Turnout | | 159,818 | 59.45 | |
| RJD gain from BJP | | Swing | {{{swing}}} | |

=== 2010 ===
In the 2010 state assembly elections, Lalan Kunwar of Bharatiya Janata Party won the newly constituted Teghra seat defeating his nearest rival Ram Ratan Singh of CPI.

In 1962, Chandra Shekhar Singh won from Barauni seat as the first Left party member to the state legislative assembly. Since then Teghra has been bastion of CPI till 2010 when it was defeated.
