= Kita Cercle =

Coordinates: 13°15′N 9°20′W

Kita
- Cercle
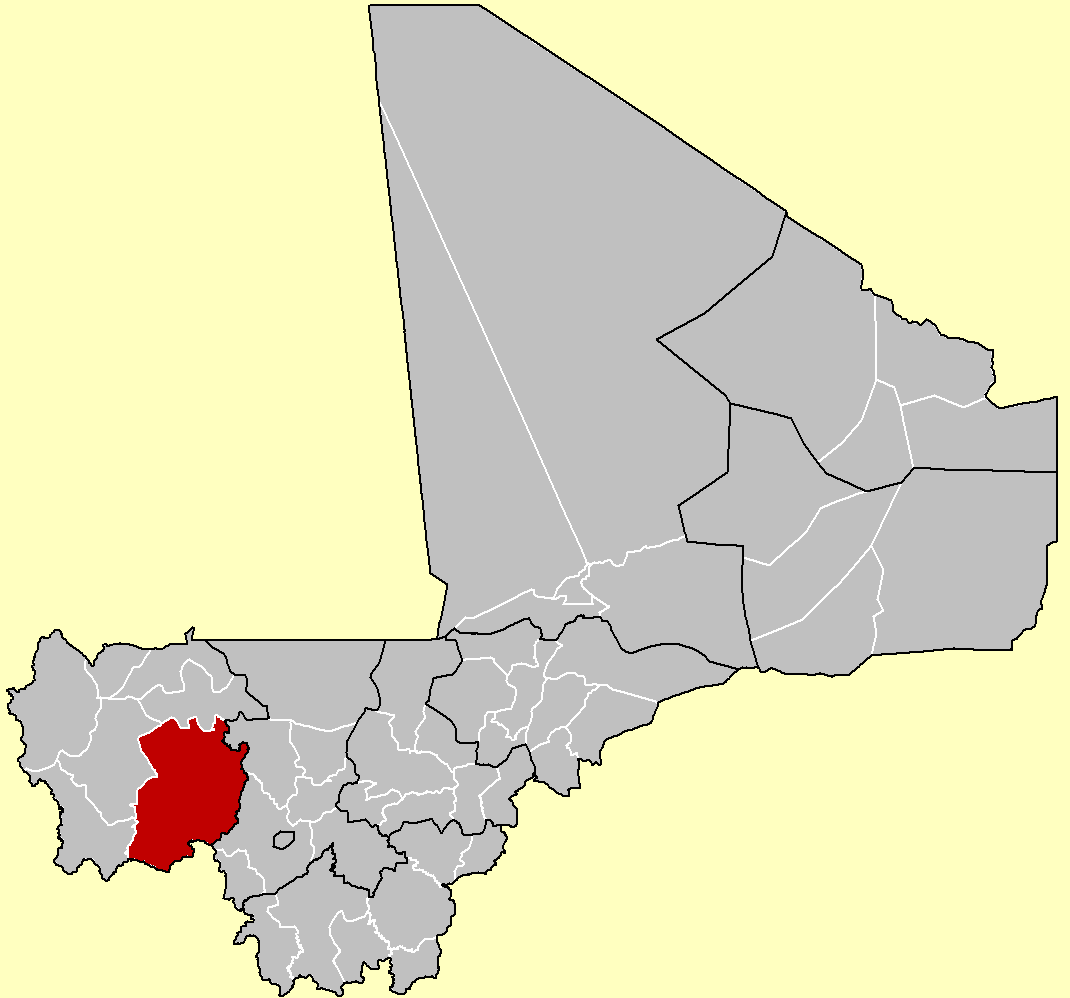
- Location of Kita Cercle in Mali
- Country: Mali
- Region: Kayes Region
- Capital: Kita

Area
  - Total: 35,250 km^{2} (13,610 sq mi)

Population (2009 census)
  - Total: 434,379
  - Density: 12.32/km^{2} (31.92/sq mi)
- Time zone: UTC+0 (GMT)

Kita Cercle is an administrative subdivision of the Kayes Region of Mali. The administrative centre (chef-lieu) is the town of Kita. In the 2009 census the population of the cercle was 434,379.

The cercle is divided into 33 communes:

- Badia
- Bendougouba
- Benkadi Founia
- Boudofo
- Bougaribaya
- Didenko or Dindanko
- Djidian
- Djougoun
- Gadougou I
- Gadougou II
- Guémoucouraba
- Kassaro
- Kita (an urban commune)
- Kita Nord
- Kita Ouest
- Kobri
- Kokofata
- Kotouba
- Koulou
- Kourouninkoto (an urban commune)
- Madina
- Makano
- Namala Guimba
- Niantanso
- Saboula
- Sébékoro
- Séféto Nord
- Séféto Ouest
- Senko
- Sirakoro
- Souransan-Tomoto
- Tambaga
- Toukoto
