= Bhawanipur (Begusarai) =

- Village in Bihar
- Location in Bihar, India Bhawanipur (India)
- Coordinates: 25.6302142°N 85.8908337°E
- Country: India
- State: Bihar
- District: Begusarai
- Block: Mansurchak

Area
  - Total: 1.5 km^{2} (0.58 sq mi)
- Elevation: 49 m (161 ft)

Population (2011)
  - Total: 2,814
  - Density: 1,900/km^{2} (4,900/sq mi)

Languages
  - Spoken: Maithili, Hindi, Urdu language, and English
- Time zone: UTC+5:30 (IST)
- PIN: 851111
- Vehicle registration: BR-09
- Website: begusarai.bih.nic.in

Bhawanipur is a small hamlet in Mansurchak Block in Begusarai District of Bihar state, India. It comes under Bhawanipur Panchayath. It is located 39 km (24 mi) west of the district headquarters at Begusarai and 2 km (1.2 mi) from Mansurchak.
