= Naipur =

- Village in Bihar
- Location in Bihar, India Naipur (India)
- Coordinates: 25.6150632°N 85.9227884°E
- Country: India
- State: Bihar
- District: Begusarai
- Block: Mansurchak

Government
  - Type: Gram Panchayat
  - Body: Naipur

Area
  - Total: 1.97 km^{2} (0.76 sq mi)
- Elevation: 49 m (161 ft)

Population (2011)
  - Total: 1,039
  - Density: 527/km^{2} (1,370/sq mi)

Languages
  - Spoken: Maithili, Hindi, Urdu language, and English
- Time zone: UTC+5:30 (IST)
- PIN: 851128
- Vehicle registration: BR-09
- Website: begusarai.bih.nic.in

Naipur is a small village in Mansurchak Block in Begusarai District of Bihar State, India. It is located 35 km towards North from District headquarters Begusarai. 1 km from Mansurchak.

== Transport ==
=== Roadways ===
Dalsinghsarai are the nearby towns to Naipur having road connectivity to Naipur

=== Railways ===
Bachhwara Junction Rail Way Station, Fateha Rail Way Station are the very nearby railway stations to Naipur. Dalsingh Sarai Rail Way Station (near to Dalsinghsarai), Sathajagat Rail Way Station (near to Dalsinghsarai) are the Rail way stations reachable from near by towns.

== Education ==
Middle school naipur
