= Bhushan =

Bhushan is a male Indian given and family name. It may refer to:

== People ==
- Ardhendu Bhushan Bardhan (1924–2016), general secretary of the Communist Party of India
- Amita Bhushan (born 1970), Indian politician
- Bharat Bhushan (1920–1992), prominent actor of the 1950s and 1960s in Bollywood
- Bharat Bhushan (yogi) (born 1952), yoga guru
- Bhushan Kumar (born 1977), Indian film producer
- Bhushan Lal Karihaloo (born 1943), professor of civil, architectural, and environmental engineering
- Bhushan Tiwari, Indian film actor in Hindi films
- Brij Bhushan Sharan Singh (born 1957), Indian politician
- Brij Bhushan Tiwari (1941–2012), Indian Samajwadi Party politician
- Chandra Bhushan Singh (born 1944), Indian politician
- Kavi Bhushan, 17th century Indian poet
- Prashant Bhushan, civil liberties lawyer of India
- Shanti Bhushan (1925–2023), Indian politician, minister and senior advocate

== See also ==
- Padma Bhushan award, an Indian civilian decoration established in 1954 by the President of India
- Bhushan Steel, the largest manufacturer of auto-grade steel in India
