= Purani Chak =

Village in Bihar, India

- Village
- Location in Bihar, India Purani Chak (India)
- Coordinates: 25.6398°N 85.9362°E
- Country: India
- State: Bihar
- District: Begusarai
- Block: Mansurchak

Area^{†}
  - Total: 0.12 km^{2} (0.046 sq mi)
- Elevation: 49 m (161 ft)

Population (2011)
  - Total: 709
  - Density: 5,900/km^{2} (15,000/sq mi)
- Time zone: UTC+05:30 (IST)
- PIN: 851128
- Telephone code: 06278
- Vehicle registration: BR-09
- Sex ratio: 846♂♂
- Language: Hindi, Maithili, Urdu
- Additional language: English
- Website: begusarai.bih.nic.in

Purani Chak is a small Village in Mansurchak Block in Begusarai District of Bihar State, India. It comes under Purani Chak Panchayath. It is 36 km north of district headquarters Begusarai, and 3 km from Mansurchak.

== Demographics ==
According to the 2011 census, Purani Chak had 170 households and 709 inhabitants.
