= Dasrathpur =

- village in Bihar
- Location in Bihar, India Dasrathpur (India)
- Coordinates: 25.6394°N 85.8959°E
- Country: India
- State: Bihar
- District: Begusarai
- Block: Mansurchak

Area^{†}
  - Total: 1 km^{2} (0.39 sq mi)
- Elevation: 49 m (161 ft)

Population (2011)
  - Total: 1,551
  - Density: 1,600/km^{2} (4,000/sq mi)
- Time zone: UTC+05:30 (IST)
- PIN: 851128
- Telephone code: 06278
- Vehicle registration: BR-09
- Sex ratio: 935♀♀♀
- Language: Hindi, Maithili, Urdu
- Additional language: English
- Website: begusarai.bih.nic.in

Dasrathpur is a small village in Mansurchak Block in Begusarai District of Bihar State, India. It comes under Dasrathpur Panchayath. It belongs to Darbhanga Division. It is located 39 km north of district headquarters Begusarai. It is 2 km from Mansurchak. Dasrathpur Pin code is 851128, and the postal head office is Mansurchak.
