= Ramdeo Rai =

Indian politician (1943–2020)

Member of Bihar Legislative Assembly
- In office 2015–2020
- Preceded by: Awadhesh Rai
- Succeeded by: Surendra Mehata
- Constituency: Bachhwara

Member of Bihar Legislative Assembly
- In office 2005–2010 (2-Terms)
- Preceded by: Uttam Kumar Yadav
- Succeeded by: Awadhesh Rai
- Constituency: Bachhwara

Member of Bihar Legislative Assembly
- In office 1972-1977; 1977-1980; 1980–1984
- Ajit Kumar Mehta
- Preceded by: V. P. Singh
- Succeeded by: Ayodhya Prasad Singh
- Constituency: Bachhwara

Member of Parliament, Lok Sabha
- In office 1984–1989
- Preceded by: Ajit Kumar Mehta
- Succeeded by: Manjay Lal
- Constituency: Samastipur

Personal details
- Born: 5 January 1943 Vill. Sherpur Sahilori, Post. Jayantigram, PS. Bhagwanpur, Dist-Begusarai, Bihar
- Died: 29 August 2020 (aged 77) Patna, Bihar, India
- Cause of death: Cancer
- Party: Indian National Congress
- Spouse(s): Raj Kumari Devi; RamKumari Devi
- Children: 7 (2 son and 5 daughter)
- Education: Master of Arts
- Profession: Politician social worker

Ramdeo Rai (5 January 1943 – 29 August 2020) was an Indian politician. He was elected to the Bihar Legislative Assembly from Bachhwara in 2015. Rai was the most senior politician in the Bihar Congress Party and he served six times as a Member of Bihar Legislative Assembly. In 14 November 1965 he started his career in politics on Jawaharlal Nehru's birthday. In 1984 he won the Samastipur Lok Sabha constituency against Karpoori Thakur.
