= Surendra Mehta =

Indian politician (born 1959)

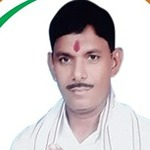

Minister of Animal and Fisheries Resources Government of Bihar
- In office 20 November 2025 – 15 April 2026
- Preceded by: Renu Devi
- Succeeded by: Samrat Choudhary

Member of Bihar Legislative Assembly
- Incumbent
- Assumed office 2020
- Preceded by: Ramdeo Rai
- Constituency: Bachhwara
- In office 2010–2015
- Preceded by: Srikrishna Prasad Singh
- Succeeded by: Amita Bhushan
- Constituency: Begusarai

Minister of Sports Government of Bihar
- In office 15 March 2024 – 20 November 2025
- Preceded by: Samrat Choudhary
- Succeeded by: Shreyasi Singh

Personal details
- Born: 5 May 1959 (age 67)
- Party: Bharatiya Janata Party
- Occupation: Politician

Surendra Mehta is an Indian politician from Bihar and the current minister of Animal and fisheries and formerly Department of Sports, Government of Bihar. He is a second term Member of the Bihar Legislative Assembly.

== Political career ==
Mehta had contested his first election in 2005 from Barauni against Rajendra Prasad Singh of CPI and had lost by 4957 votes. He contested from Begusarai in 2010 and defeated his nearest rival Upendra Prasad Singh of LJP by 19,618 votes. He lost in 2015 from Begusarai to Amita Bhushan of Congress by 16,531 votes. In 2020 he had won from Bachhwara by 484 votes against Awadhesh Rai of CPI. He was inducted into Nitish Kumar cabinet on 15 March 2024 and was allotted the Department of Sports.
