= Sirirampur Bhaunath =

- village in Bihar
- Location in Bihar, India Sirirampur Bhaunath (India)
- Coordinates: 25.6316°N 85.9068°E
- Country: India
- State: Bihar
- District: Begusarai
- Block: Mansurchak
- Elevation: 49 m (161 ft)
- Time zone: UTC+05:30 (IST)
- PIN: 851128
- Telephone code: 06278
- Vehicle registration: BR-09
- Language: Hindi, Maithili, Urdu
- Additional language: English
- Website: begusarai.bih.nic.in

Sirirampur Bhaunath is 851128, Sirirampur Bhaunath comes under Mansurchak post office. It is part of Mansurchak block, total 38 villages/localities come. Sirirampur Bhaunath is located at Begusarai district of Bihar.
