= Sarai Nurnagar =

- village
- Location in Bihar, India Sarai Nurnagar (India)
- Coordinates: 25.6163°N 85.9138°E
- Country: India
- State: Bihar
- District: Begusarai
- Block: Mansurchak

Area^{†}
  - Total: 0.188 km^{2} (0.073 sq mi)
- Elevation: 49 m (161 ft)

Population (2011)
  - Total: 2,180
  - Density: 11,600/km^{2} (30,000/sq mi)
- Time zone: UTC+05:30 (IST)
- PIN: 851128
- Telephone code: 06278
- Vehicle registration: BR-09
- Sex ratio: 945♂♂
- Language: Hindi, Maithili, Urdu
- Additional language: English
- Website: begusarai.bih.nic.in

Sarai Nurnagar is a small village in Mansurchak Block in Begusarai District of Bihar state, India. It comes under Sarai Nurnagar panchayat. It is located 36 km toward north from District headquarters Begusarai.

== Geography ==
The geographical coordinates i.e. latitude and longitude of Sarai Nurnagar is 25.6163 and 85.9138 respectively.
