= Bhouji =

Bhouji is a Bhojpuri film released in 1965 and directed by Kundan Kumar.
