= Alam Chak =

- Village
- Location in Bihar, India Alam Chak (India)
- Coordinates: 25.6328°N 85.8953°E
- Country: India
- State: Bihar
- District: Begusarai
- Block: Mansurchak
- Elevation: 49 m (161 ft)

Population (2011)
  - Total: 1,677
- Time zone: UTC+05:30 (IST)
- PIN: 851128
- Telephone code: 06278
- Vehicle registration: BR-09
- Sex ratio: 935♂♂
- Language: Hindi, Maithili, Urdu
- Additional language: English
- Website: begusarai.bih.nic.in

Alam Chak is a village in the rural Mansurchak Block of Begusarai district in Bihar, India. The village's block headquarter town is Mansurchak.

== Geography ==
The geographical coordinates i.e. latitude and longitude of Alam Chak is 25.6328 and 85.8953 respectively.
