= Basudeo Singh =

Indian politician

Basudeo Singh (c. 1932 – 29 April 2013) was an Indian politician and social activist from Begusarai district, Bihar. A long‐time member of the Communist Party of India (Marxist) [CPI(M)], he served as Member of the Legislative Assembly (MLA) for Begusarai (1990–1995) and subsequently won three consecutive terms to the Bihar Legislative Council (1996–2013). Renowned for his personal austerity, advocacy for teachers’ rights and rural development, and integrity in public life, Singh remained a respected figure across party lines until his death in office.

== Early life and education ==
Basudeo Singh was born in 1932 in Chandanpura village of Begusarai district, Bihar. Details of his early schooling are sparse; contemporaries recall he worked as a high-school teacher before entering politics. He joined the Communist Party of India (CPI) in 1946, remaining active through its 1964 split to the CPI(M).

== Political career ==
=== Member of Legislative Assembly (1990–1995) ===
In the 1990 Bihar Legislative Assembly election, Singh contested on a CPI(M) ticket from Begusarai and defeated the incumbent, capitalizing on local discontent and his background as an educator. During his five-year term, he championed rural electrification, education grants for the underprivileged, and the implementation of Mahatma Gandhi National Rural Employment Guarantee Act funds in his district.

=== Member of Legislative Council (1996–2013) ===
After stepping down as MLA in 1995, Singh was elected to the Bihar Legislative Council from the Darbhanga Teachers’ constituency in 1996. He won two further terms (2002, 2008) and served until his death. As an MLC, he was noted for:

Advocacy for teachers’ rights: Introduced motions for salary regularization, transfer policies, and pension reforms.

Integrity and simplicity: Never owned a car or permanent Patna residence, commuting by rickshaw or on foot even after becoming a legislator.

Cross-party respect: Chief Minister Nitish Kumar personally appealed for silence in the Council when Singh spoke, reflecting his standing across aisles.

== Personal life ==
Singh remained a lifelong bachelor and lived modestly in a one-room flat provided by the teachers’ association on Jamal Road, Patna. He was known to spend his free time reading Marxist literature and meeting constituents at local chai stalls.

== Death and state funeral ==
On 29 April 2013, after a prolonged illness, Singh died at AIIMS, New Delhi, aged approximately 81. The Bihar government declared a state funeral. His body was flown to Patna, lay in state at the CPI(M) office and the Council building, and was accorded full honours at Simaria Ghat in Begusarai the following day.

== Legacy ==
Singh is remembered for his unwavering commitment to public service, simplicity, and integrity. The Begusarai Teachers’ Association renamed its annual lecture series as the “Basudeo Singh Memorial Lecture” in 2014 to honour his contributions to education. In 2015, the Bihar Legislative Council instituted the “Basudeo Singh Award” for honest legislators demonstrating public-spiritedness.

== See also ==
- Begusarai district
- Bihar Legislative Assembly
- Bihar Legislative Council
- Communist Party of India (Marxist)
