= Bharaul, Bihar =

Bharaul Bharoul Bharawl
- Village in Bihar
- Location in Bihar
- Coordinates: 25.603288°N 85.946002°E
- Country: India
- State: Bihar
- District: Begusarai District
- Panchayat: Rudauli

Population (2011)
  - Total: 3,115
- Time zone: UTC+5:30 (Indian Standard Time)
- Postal code: 851111

Bharaul // is a small village situated in Bachhwara tehsil and located in Begusarai district of Bihar. It is one of 91 villages in Bachhwara Block along with villages like Rudauli and Arwa. Bharaul and Aagapur Kothi are on river-side of the Balan River (The main tributary of Kamala) opposite of each other. The nearest railway station from Bharaul is Bachhwara Junction which is 5.5 km away from the village. The main language of Bharaul is Maithili. Hindi is also spoken by most of the settlers. Bharaul village has a higher literacy rate compared to Bihar. In 2011, the literacy rate of Bharaul village was 63.64% compared to 61.80% of Bihar. In Bharaul, male literacy stood at 70.37% while female literacy rate was 56.45%.

== Schools ==
There are two middle schools located in Bharaul village. Medium of instruction is Hindi in both the schools however, basic English is also taught as per state curriculum. Both are government Schools funded by Government of Bihar. It is a co-educational school. "Middle School Bharaul" is located in south-eastern part of the village and another one is located in northern part of the village and known as "Middle School Bharaul Uttari".Classes running in the school are up to 8th standard. There is no secondary school in Bharaul so students have to go Rudauli, Mansurchak or Nayatol village, which is 3 km away.

== Economy ==
Agriculture is the mainstay of the economy. The main cash crops of the village are Oilseeds, Aniseed/ Tisi, Tobacco, Jute, Potato, Red chilies, Tomato and Rape-seed. On the other hand, the village also produces Litchi, Mango, Guava and Banana.

== Infrastructure ==
Like most Indian villages, Bharaul lacks the basic infrastructure although some parts of the village have been connected with concrete roads but a lot more needs to be done. Bharaul is well connected to other villages (Rudauli, Jahanpur, Naipur, etc.) by road and the main market of Samsa and Mansurchak are easily accessible too.

== Hospitals ==
The primary health centre Mansurchak is the nearest hospital from Bharaul which is about 3 km away. PHC Bachhwara is 7 km away. Both the hospitals are managed by the Bihar state government. The hospitals provides 24×7 medical facilities.

== Art and culture ==
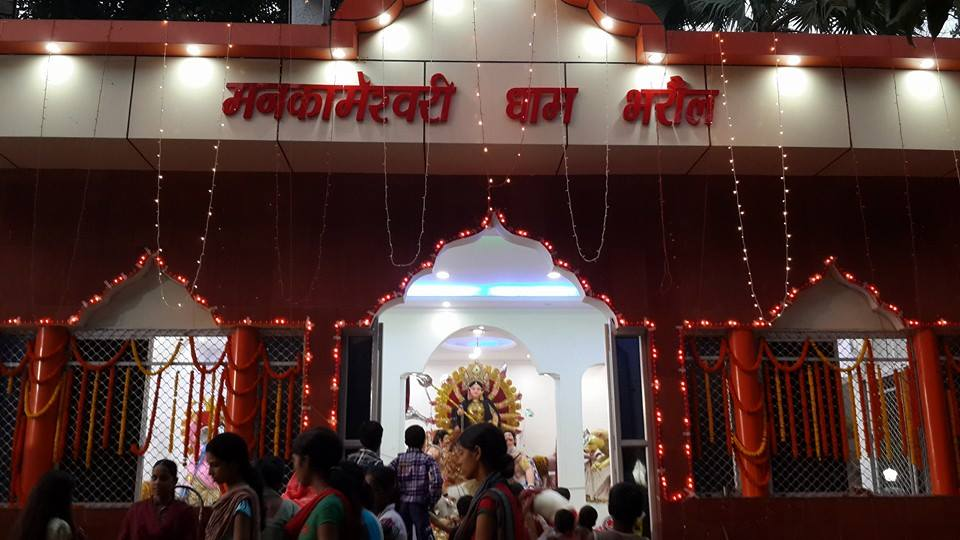
Mankameswari Dham

Kaali Puja, Holi, Chhath Puja and Durga Puja are the main festival of Bharaul. Janmashtami, Shivaratri, Hanuman Jayanti etc. are also celebrated with full zest and fervour. Sama Chakeva, Chaurchan Or Chauth Chandra etc. are other festivals of this village and observed by Hindus of the village. There are several places of worship in this village. The Shiv Mandir, which is a very old Shiva temple located at the bank of Balan river, is known for its architectural excellence. Durga mandir (Mankameswari Dham), Radha Krishn Kuti (Thakur Bari), Braham Baba Sthan, etc. are other places of importance. Every year, a grand mela is organised on the occasion of Durga Puja in this village at Mankameswari Dham. Eid and Bakrid are the major festivals of Muslims of the village. Muharram is also observed by the minority Muslim community. A newly built mosque is also adding beauty to the Village.

== Chhath Mahotsav ==
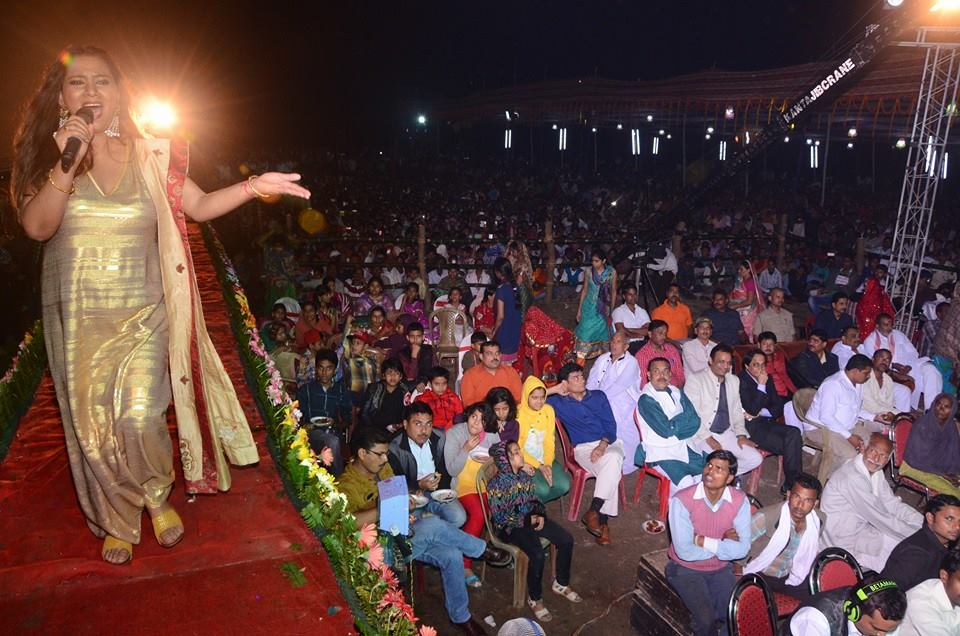
Chhhath Mahotsav

The Bharaul Mahotsav is one of the events that is organised every year. It starts on the next day of Chhath Puja. Many artists have taken part in the mega event with the likes of Manoj Tiwari, Kumar Sanu, anup jalota Anuradha Paudwal, Babul Supriyo, Nitish Ishwar, Hansraj Hans and Lakhbir Singh Lakhha.
