= Nayatol =

- village in Bihar
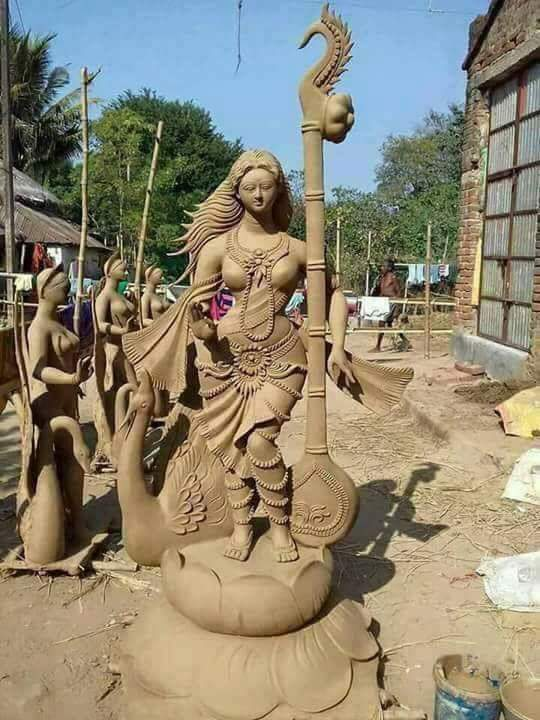

- Location in Bihar, India Nayatol (India)
- Coordinates: 25.608349°N 85.947060°E
- country: India
- State: Bihar
- District: Begusarai
- Block: Mansurchak
- Elevation: 49 m (161 ft)

Population (2011)
  - Total: 2,740

Languages
  - Spoken: Maithili, Hindi, Urdu language, and English
- Time zone: UTC+5:30 (IST)
- PIN: 851128
- Vehicle registration: BR-09
- Website: begusarai.bih.nic.in

Nayatol is a village located in Begusarai District, Bihar, India. It is one among the 38 villages of Mansurchak.

== Demographics ==
In 2011 Nayatol's population was 2740 of whom 1432 were male and 1308 female. The village had 458 children aged 0–6 years, of whom 251 were boys and 207 were girls.

The literacy ratio in Nayatol village is 58%. The male literacy rate is 63% compared with 52% for women.
