= Ganpataul =

- village in Bihar
- Location in Bihar, India Ganpataul (India)
- Coordinates: 25.6250°N 85.9087°E
- Country: India
- State: Bihar
- District: Begusarai
- Block: Mansurchak
- Elevation: 49 m (161 ft)

Population (2011)
  - Total: 5,133
- Time zone: UTC+05:30 (IST)
- PIN: 851128
- Telephone code: 06278
- Vehicle registration: BR-09
- Sex ratio: 918♂♂
- Language: Hindi, Maithili, Urdu
- Additional language: English
- Website: begusarai.bih.nic.in

Ganpataul is a village in the Begusarai District of the Indian state of Bihar. It lies some 36 kilometres north of Begusarai, in the Mansurchak Block.
