= Agapur =

- Village
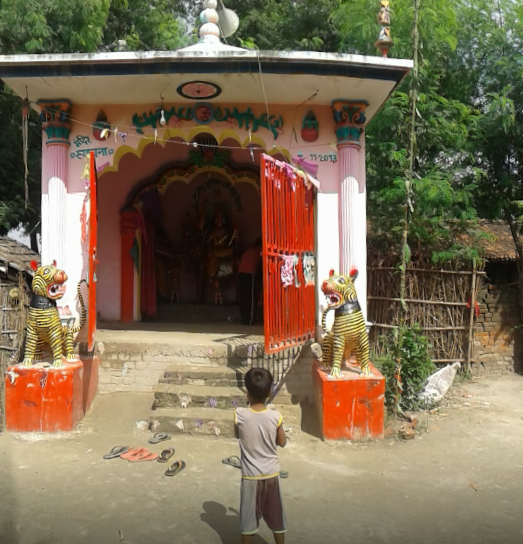
- Raja Salesh Mandir, Agapur

- Location in Bihar, India Agapur (India)
- Coordinates: 25.6143°N 85.9496°E
- Country: India
- State: Bihar
- District: Begusarai
- Block: Mansurchak

Government
  - Type: Gram Panchayat
  - Body: Agapur

Area
  - Total: 2.15 km^{2} (0.83 sq mi)
- Elevation: 49 m (161 ft)

Population (2011)
  - Total: 3,338
  - Density: 1,550/km^{2} (4,020/sq mi)

Languages
  - Spoken: Maithili, Hindi, Urdu language, and English
- Time zone: UTC+5:30 (IST)
- PIN: 851128
- Vehicle registration: BR-09
- Website: begusarai.bih.nic.in

Agapur is a village in Begusarai district, in the state of Bihar, India.

== Demographics ==
The village is home to 3338 people, among them 1738 (52%) are male and 1600 (48%) are female. 46% of the whole population are from general caste, 54% are from schedule caste. The child (aged under 6 years) population of Agapur village is 20%, among them 52% are boys and 48% are girls. There are 670 households in the village.
