= Hawaspur =

- village in Bihar
- Location in Bihar, India Hawaspur (India)
- Coordinates: 25.6425°N 85.9011°E
- Country: India
- State: Bihar
- District: Begusarai
- Block: Mansurchak
- Elevation: 49 m (161 ft)

Population (2011)
  - Total: 2,924
- Time zone: UTC+05:30 (IST)
- PIN: 851128
- Telephone code: 06278
- Vehicle registration: BR-09
- Sex ratio: 935♂♂
- Language: Hindi, Maithili, Urdu
- Additional language: English
- Website: begusarai.bih.nic.in

Hawaspur is a village located in Mansurchak Block of Begusarai district in Bihar. Positioned in rural region of Begusarai district of Bihar, it is one among the 38 villages of Mansurchak Block of Begusarai district.

== Geography ==
The total geographical area of village is 105 hectares. Hawaspur has a total population of 2,924 people. There are about 596 houses in Hawaspur village. Dalsinghsarai is nearest town to Hawaspur which is approximately 10 km away.

== Transport ==
Roadways

Railyways
