= Manoj Kumar Mishra =

Indian academic and researcher (born 1952)

Dr. Manoj Kumar Mishra

Head, Department of Chemistry, IIT Bombay
- In office 1985 – 2009

37th Vice-chancellor of the University of Lucknow
- In office 21 October 2009 - 2 November 2012
- Appointed by: Banwari Lal Joshi, Governor of Uttar Pradesh
- Preceded by: Upendra Nath Dwivedi
- Succeeded by: Gopabandhu Patnaik

Vice-chancellor of the Birla Institute of Technology, Mesra
- In office 22 November 2013

Personal details
- Born: 15 October 1952 (age 73) Begusarai, Bihar, India
- Spouse: Meena Mishra
- Education: St. Xavier's College, Ranchi; IIT Delhi; University of Florida

Manoj Kumar Mishra (born 15 October 1952) is an Indian academic and researcher. He served as the 37th vice-chancellor of the University of Lucknow. He is recognized for his work in quantum chemistry.

Mishra completed his education at the St. Xavier's College, IIT Delhi and the University of Florida. He then completed a postdoctoral fellowship at Princeton University.

Mishra has held academic positions, including vice chancellor of Lucknow University (2009–2012), and also served in leadership roles at IIT Bombay.

== Academic and teaching career ==
Mishra began his career in academia after a postdoctoral research associateship at Princeton University, USA. He joined the Indian Institute of Technology (IIT) Bombay as a faculty member, where he spent 27 years in various capacities, including head of the Department of Chemistry and chairman of the Graduate Aptitude Test in Engineering (GATE) from June 2008 to July 2009. He served as the vice chancellor of the University of Lucknow, from 21 October 2009 to 2 November 2012. Since November 22, 2013, he has been vice chancellor of BIT Mesra, Ranchi.

== Legacy ==
Mishra became a Fellow of the Indian Academy of Sciences in 1999. He was elected to the National Academy of Sciences, India,
