= Begusarai Assembly constituency =

Begusarai
- Constituency No. 146 for the Bihar Legislative Assembly

Constituency details
- Country: India
- Region: East India
- State: Bihar
- District: Begusarai
- Lok Sabha constituency: Begusarai Lok Sabha
- Established: 1951
- Total electors: 342,217
- Reservation: None

Member of Legislative Assembly
- 18th Bihar Legislative Assembly
- Incumbent Kundan Kumar
- Party: BJP
- Alliance: NDA
- Elected year: 2025

Begusarai Assembly constituency is an assembly constituency in Begusarai district in the Indian state of Bihar. In 2015 Bihar Legislative Assembly election, Begusarai was one of the 36 seats to have VVPAT enabled electronic voting machines.

== Overview ==
As per Delimitation of Parliamentary and Assembly constituencies Order, 2008, No. 146 Begusarai Assembly constituency is composed of the following: Begusarai municipality; Birpur community development block; Babhangama, Maida Babhangama, Sahuri, Neenga and Bathauli gram panchayats of Barauni CD Block; Mohanpur, Chandpura, Bandwar, Suja, Sankh, Lakho, Hebatpur, Parna, Kusmaut, Kaith, Jinedpur, Neema, Panhas, Ajhaur, Khamhar and Rajaura gram panchayats of Begusarai CD Block.

Begusarai Assembly constituency is part of No. 24 Begusarai (Lok Sabha constituency).

Most Successful parties from Begusarai Vidhan Sabha
1. INC (8 times), {including 2 MLAs in 1952 and 1957 election} (50.0%)
2. BJP (6 Times) (30.0%)
3. CPI(M) (2 times) (10.0%)
4. CPI (1 time) (5.00%)
5. Independent (1 time) (5.00%)

== Members of the Legislative Assembly ==
Year	Name	Party
1952	Saryu Prasad Singh	Indian National Congress
1952	Md. Illiyas	Indian National Congress
1957	Medni Paswan	Indian National Congress
1957	Saryu Prasad Singh	Indian National Congress
1962	Ram Narain Choudhary	Indian National Congress
1967	Bhola Singh	Independent politician
1969	Saryu Prasad Singh	Indian National Congress
1972	Bhola Singh	Communist Party of India
1977	Bhola Singh	Indian National Congress
1980	Bhola Singh	Indian National Congress (I)
1985	Bhola Singh	Indian National Congress
1990	Basudeo Singh	Communist Party of India (Marxist)
1995	Rajendra Prasad Singh	Communist Party of India (Marxist)
2000	Bhola Singh	Bharatiya Janata Party
2005	Bhola Singh	Bharatiya Janata Party
2005	Bhola Singh	Bharatiya Janata Party
2009^	Srikrishna Prasad Singh	Bharatiya Janata Party
2010	Surendra Mehata	Bharatiya Janata Party
2015	Amita Bhushan	Indian National Congress
2020	Kundan Kumar	Bharatiya Janata Party
2025	Kundan Kumar	Bharatiya Janata Party

^by-election

== Election results ==
=== 2025 ===
2025 Bihar Legislative Assembly election: Begusarai
Party	Candidate	Votes	%	±%
BJP	Kundan Kumar	119,506	52.31	+12.65
INC	Amita Bhushan	88,874	38.9	+1.67
JSP	Surendra Kumar Sahani	7,773	3.4	
Independent	Md. Saddam Husain	2,912	1.27	
NOTA	None of the above	3,560	1.56	+1.06
Majority		30,632	13.41	+10.98
Turnout		228,447	66.76	+11.16
BJP hold		Swing		

=== 2020 ===
2020 Bihar Legislative Assembly election: Begusarai
Party	Candidate	Votes	%	±%
BJP	Kundan Kumar	74,217	39.66	+0.19
INC	Amita Bhushan	69,663	37.23	−11.98
Independent	Rajesh Kumar	18,002	9.62	+8.88
RLSP	Sanju Kumari	5,531	2.96	
Independent	Rajendra Kumar Alias Raja	3,438	1.84	
Independent	Sohit Tanti	2,096	1.12	
Independent	Sanjay Gautam	2,057	1.1	
Independent	Ashutosh Kumar Alias Hira Poddar	1,936	1.03	
BMP	Nand Kumar Sah	1,813	0.97	+0.46
NOTA	None of the above	930	0.5	−2.26
Majority		4,554	2.43	−7.31
Turnout		187,135	55.6	+1.13
BJP gain from INC		Swing	2.44	

=== 2015 ===
Bihar Assembly election, 2015: Begusarai
Party	Candidate	Votes	%	±%
INC	Amita Bhushan	83,521	49.21	
BJP	Surendra Mehata	66,990	39.47	
CPI(M)	Rajendra Prasad Singh	5,593	3.3	
SP	Dileep Kesari	1,815	1.07	
NOTA	None of the above	4,678	2.76	
Majority		16,531	9.74	
Turnout		169,726	54.47	
INC gain from BJP		Swing	9.8	
