= Chak Mansur =

- village
- Location in Bihar, India Chak Mansur (India)
- Coordinates: 25.6120°N 85.9340°E
- Country: India
- State: Bihar
- District: Begusarai
- Block: Mansurchak
- Elevation: 49 m (161 ft)

Population (2011)
  - Total: 112
- Time zone: UTC+05:30 (IST)
- PIN: 851128
- Telephone code: 06278
- Vehicle registration: BR-09
- Sex ratio: 935♂♂
- Language: Hindi, Maithili, Urdu
- Additional language: English
- Website: begusarai.bih.nic.in

Chak Mansur is one of 38 villages in the rural Mansurchak Block of the Begusarai district of the state of Bihar in India.
