= Amita Bhushan =

Indian politician

Bihar Vidhan Sabha 16th Bihar Assembly
- In office 2015–2020
- Preceded by: Surendra Mehta
- Succeeded by: Kundan Kumar
- Constituency: Begusarai

President of Bihar Pradesh Mahila Congress
- In office 2021-Current

Personal details
- Born: 5 February 1970 (age 56) Begusarai, Bihar, India
- Party: Indian National Congress
- Children: Two
- Candidate for Lok Sabha Elections 2009 from Begusarai
- As of 4 April, 2009

Amita Bhushan (born 5 February 1970) is an Indian politician, representing the Begusarai constituency on a Congress ticket in the Bihar Vidhan Sabha since 2015, her first stint as MLA. She is a member of Indian National Congress. Born and brought up in Begusarai, Bhushan is a social activist and fashion designer with an MA in psychology. Her mother was an MP and her village is cheriya bariyarpur.

== Contributions ==
She runs a society in the name of CBRKC Foundation and runs without any aid or government support.

== Begusarai development data ==
Table 1: Development data of Begusarai
Details	2004	2008
Total population (in '000s)	2,507	2,661
Sex ratio (females per 1000 males)	915.4	920.1
Crime against women (% of total crime)	2.7	5.4
Violent crime (% of total crime)	17.9	24.9
Infant mortality rate (per 1000 live births)	54.1	49.4
Households with electricity (% of total households)	10.7	4.7
Total literacy rate (% of total population)	50.9	54.6
Below poverty line (% of total population)	45	41.3
Work participation rate (% of total population)	32.8	34.1
Urbanization (% of total population)	3.6	2.7

== Controversy ==
As per The Times of India, a section of Congress leaders from Bihar are questioning the party's decision to field candidates who have poor track records in elections. They have questioned the candidature of a relatively unknown face like Amita Bhushan from Begusarai from where it could have fielded former PCC chief Ram Jatan Sinha. "In several constituencies, we still look like vote-katwas," said a former Congress MLA.

== Personal life ==
Her husband is a government servant in All-India Service.

== See also ==
- Indian National Congress
- Begusarai
- Begusarai (Lok Sabha constituency)
