= Begusarai Municipal Corporation =

Civic body governing Begusarai, Bihar, India

Type
- Type: Municipal corporation

History
- Founded: 2010; 15 years ago

Leadership
- Mayor: Pinki Devi
- Deputy Mayor: Anita Devi
- Municipal Commissioner: Manoj Kumar
- Seats: 45

Meeting place
- Chitragupta Nagar, Begusarai, Bihar - 851101

Website
- nagarseva.bihar.gov.in/begusarai

Begusarai Municipal Corporation or Begusarai Nagar Nigam, is the civic body that governs Begusarai, a city of Bihar in India.Begusarai city lies in Begusarai district of Bihar and is governed by Municipal Corporation. It is located in central part of northern Bihar. It was designated as a Municipal Corporation in 2010, and is also the administrative headquarters of Begusarai district. In 1870, Begusarai was established as a sub-division of Munger district. Later, it became a separate district in 1972. Begusarai was named after 'Begu' a man of this district who used to look after 'Sarai' an old and small market of the region. Begusarai city is governed by Begusarai Municipal Corporation which provides major community services in this district. The district lies on the northern bank of the Ganga river.

== Functions ==
Begusarai Municipal Corporation is created for the following functions:

- Planning for the town including its surroundings which are covered under its Department's Urban Planning Authority .
- Approving construction of new buildings and authorising use of land for various purposes.
- Improvement of the town's economic and Social status.
- Arrangements of water supply towards commercial, residential and industrial purposes.
- Planning for fire contingencies through Fire Service Departments.
- Creation of solid waste management, public health system and sanitary services.
- Working for the development of ecological aspect like development of Urban Forestry and making guidelines for environmental protection.
- Working for the development of weaker sections of the society like mentally and physically handicapped, old age and gender biased people.
- Making efforts for improvement of slums and poverty removal in the town.

== Revenue ==
The following are the Income sources for the Corporation from the Central and State Government

=== Revenue from taxes ===
Following is the Tax related revenue for the corporation:

- Property tax
- Profession tax
- Entertainment tax
- Grants from Central and State Government like Goods and Services Tax
- Advertisement tax

=== Revenue from non-tax sources ===
Following is the Non Tax related revenue for the corporation:

- Water usage charges
- Fees from Documentation services
- Rent received from municipal property
- Funds from municipal bonds
