= Mansurchak Block =

Mansurchak Block मंसूरचक प्रखंड
- Community Development Block
- Location in Bihar, India
- Coordinates: 25.6254°N 85.9215°E
- Country: India
- State: Bihar
- District: Begusarai
- Lok Sabha constituency: Begusarai
- Assembly constituency: Bachhwara
- Region: Mithila
- Established: 1995

Government
  - Type: Community Development Block
  - Body: Mansurchak Block
  - member of parliament: Giriraj Singh
  - member of legislative assembly: Ramdev Rai

Area
  - Total: 26 km^{2} (10 sq mi)
- Elevation: 49 m (161 ft)

Population (2011)
  - Total: 80,510
  - Density: 3,100/km^{2} (8,000/sq mi)
- Time zone: UTC+5:30 (IST)
- PIN: 851128
- Telephone code: 06278
- ISO 3166 code: IN-BR
- Vehicle registration: BR-09
- Sex ratio: 935
- Language: Hindi, Maithili, Urdu
- Additional language: English
- Website: begusarai.bih.nic.in

Mansurchak Block (Hindi: मंसूरचक प्रखंड) is one of the eighteen Blocks of Begusarai District of Bihar state, India. As per the government register, the block number of Mansurchak is 297. The block has 41 villages and one town of Mansurchak. It is the headquarters of Begusarai District.It is a part of Darbhanga Division.

== Geography ==
Mansurchak block is a city situated in Begusarai district of Bihar which falls in India. The geographical coordinates i.e. latitude and longitude of Mansurchak is 25.631262 and 85.907322 respectively. Mansurchak observes Indian Standard Time. The currency code for Indian rupee is INR. The currency used in Mansurchak block is Indian rupee.

== Demographics ==
Religion in Mansurchak Block (2011)
Religion	Percent
Hindus	83.14%
Muslims	16.62%
Others	0.24%

== Transport ==
=== Roadways ===
Mansurchak block is connected by road. This town is situated on Dalsinghsarai to zero mile-malti road which links zero mile to city of Dalsinghsarai, Samastipur. It is also connected to Bachwara NH-28.

=== Railways ===
Bachwara Jn railway station is the nearest railway station from Mansurchak. The straight line distance from Mansurchak to Bachwara Jn railway station is 5.3 kilometers. The nearest railway station and its distance from Mansurchak are:

- Bachwara Jn railway station 5.3 km
- Sathajagat railway station 5.4 km
- Dalsingh Sarai railway station 9.1 km

== Climate ==
It is hot in summer. Mansurchak block summer highest day temperature is between 29 °C to 45 °C . The average temperature in January is 16 °C . February is 20 °C. March is 27 °C. April is 32 °C. May is 36 °C. June is 39 °C.

== Education ==
D. B. M. Inter College was established in 1981 and it is managed by the Department of Education. The school is taught in Hindi and consists of grades 11 and 12. The school is co-educational and does not have an attached pre-primary section.[]

10+2 high school

N N Shina 10+2

10+2 SBD Girls Higher Secondary School

T P C High School Nayatol Agapur

Ahiapur High School

CBSE Pattern

Modern Public School

S D M Public School

Udaan the 7 habits Foundation School

Career Public School

Raj Public School Kastoli

== Hospital ==
=== Mansoorchak Charitable Dispensry ===
Mansurchak Charitable Dispensary is the second largest government hospital in the Begusarai district by number of patients who come for treatment and delivery.

Nayatol Government Hospital

== Bank ==
UCO Bank

Bihar Gramin Bank

SBI Grahak Seva

== Village ==
S No.	Mansurchak
1	Agapur
2	Gachhitola
3	Alam Chak
4	Bahrampur
5	Bhawanipur(mansurchak)
6	Chak Alahdadpur
7	Chak Mansur
8	Chhabilapur
9	Dasrathpur
10	Ganpataul
11	Gauspur
12	Gobindpur(mansurchak)
13	Gurdaspur
14	Hawaspur
15	Jamalpur(mansurchak)
16	Kastoli
17	Kazi Chak
18	Mahammadpur Masum
19	Mahendarganj
20	Mansurchak
21	Mansur Chak Arazi
22	Maranchi
23	Maskan Dargah
24	Milki
25	Mohiuddinpur
26	Momina(mansurchak)
27	Mominabad
28	Mominabad Arazi
29	Naipur
30	Nayatol
31	Purani Chak
32	Rasalpur
33	Salempur(mansurchak)
34	Santha Rasidpur
35	Sarai Nurnagar
36	Samsa bazzar
37	Sirampur
38	Sirirampur Bhaunath
39	Sohilwara

== Politics ==
Mansurchak block comes under the Bachwara assembly constituency. The major political parties in this area are:

- Indian National Congress
- Janata Dal (United)
- Lok Janshakti Party
- Rashtriya Janata Dal
- Bharatiya Janata Party
- Communist Party of India
- Communist Party of India (Marxist)
