= Simaria Ghat =

Sacred Ghat for Ganga Snaana in Mithila

Coordinates: 25°22′45.47″N 86°0′9.42″E

- सिमरिया घाट
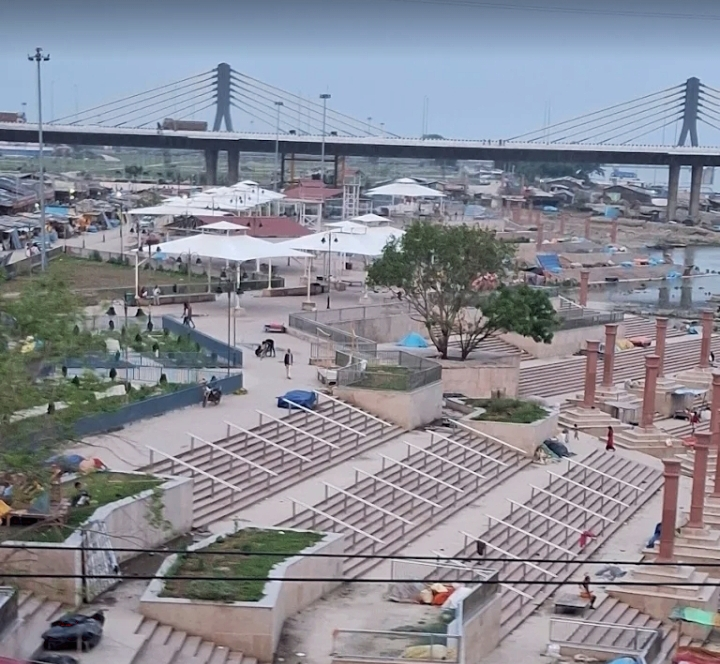
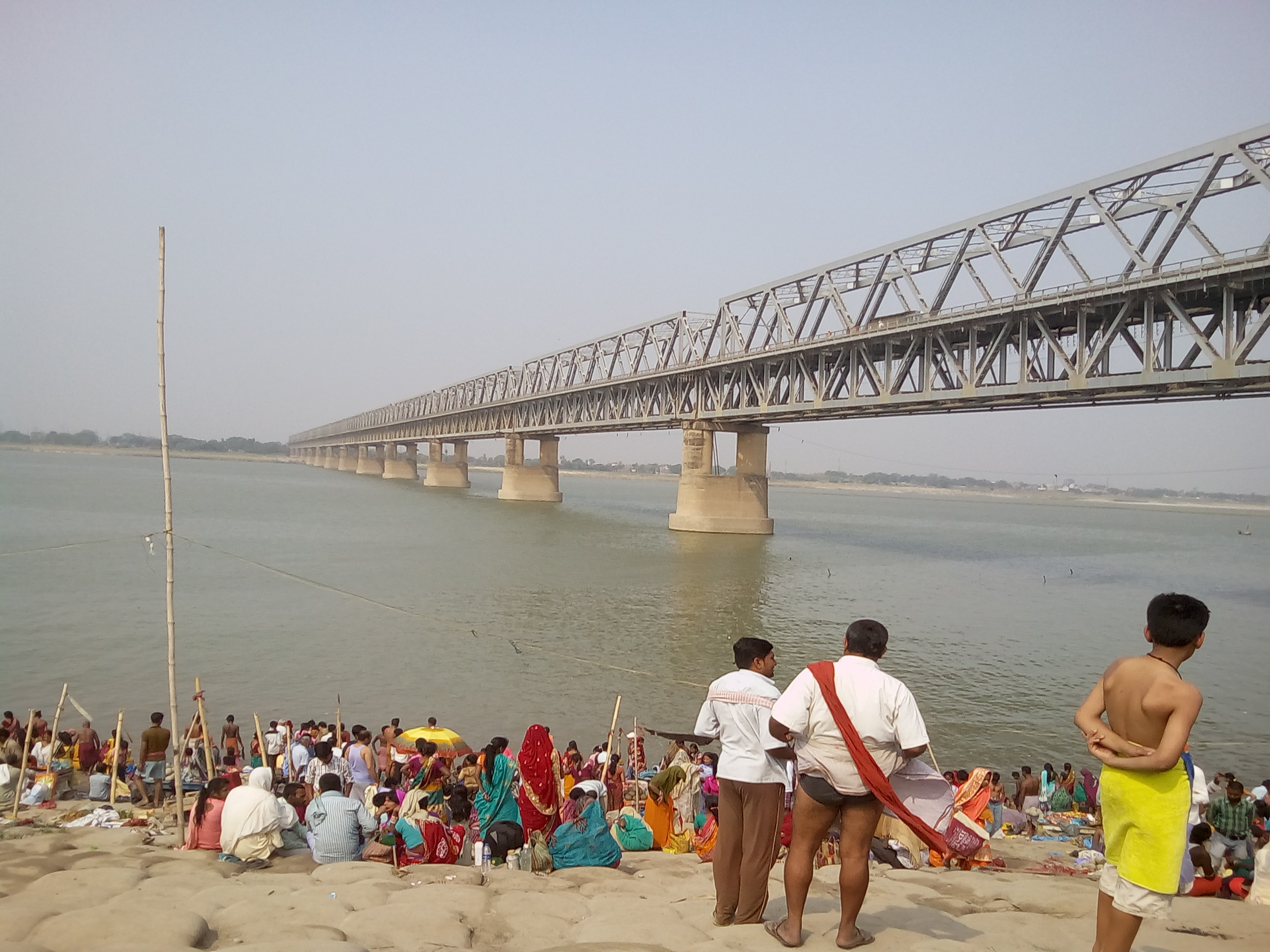
- View of the Rajendra Pul on the sacred Ganga river from Simaria Ghat
- Type: Sacred place in Hinduism
- Classification: Hinduism
- Structure: Ghat
- Block/Area: Barauni
- District: Begusarai
- State: Bihar
- Region: Mithila region
- Founder: King Janaka
- A sacred Ghat for Ganga Snaana in Hinduism

Simaria Ghat (Maithili: सिमरिया घाट) is a holy place in Hinduism for the sacred bath known as Ganga Snaana in the Mithila region of Indian subcontinent. It is located at the bank of Ganga river near Barauni Thermal Power Station of the Begusarai district in Bihar state of India. The sacred locations in the vicinity of the Simaria Ghat is called as Simaria Dhaama. According to legend, it is believed as the Tapobhumi of the King Janaka in Mithila. It is said that the King Janaka started a famous Kalpavas Mela here in the Treta Yuga. The Kalpavas Mela is still very popular among the Hindu adherents in the region. The Hindu devotees from the Mithila region as well as from another parts of the subcontinent come here in the Kartik month for observing and practicing one month long Kalpavas ritual.
