= Santha Rasidpur =

Satha Rasidpur Satha
- Village
- Location in Bihar, India Satha Rasidpur (India)
- Coordinates: 25.6370°N 85.8614°E
- Country: India
- State: Bihar
- District: Begusarai
- Block: Mansurchak

Area^{†}
  - Total: 3.17 km^{2} (1.22 sq mi)
- Elevation: 49 m (161 ft)

Population (2011)
  - Total: 6,070
  - Density: 1,910/km^{2} (4,960/sq mi)
- Time zone: UTC+05:30 (IST)
- PIN: 851128
- Telephone code: 06278
- Vehicle registration: BR-09
- Sex ratio: 934♀♀♀
- Language: Hindi, Maithili, Urdu
- Additional language: English
- Website: begusarai.bih.nic.in

Santha Rasidpur is a large village located in Mansurchak Block of Begusarai district in Bihar. Positioned in rural region of Begusarai district of Bihar, it is one among the 38 villages of Mansurchak Block

== Geography ==
The geographical coordinates i.e. latitude and longitude of Santha Rasidpur is 25.6370 and 85.8614 respectively.
