= Awadhesh Kumar Rai =

Indian politician

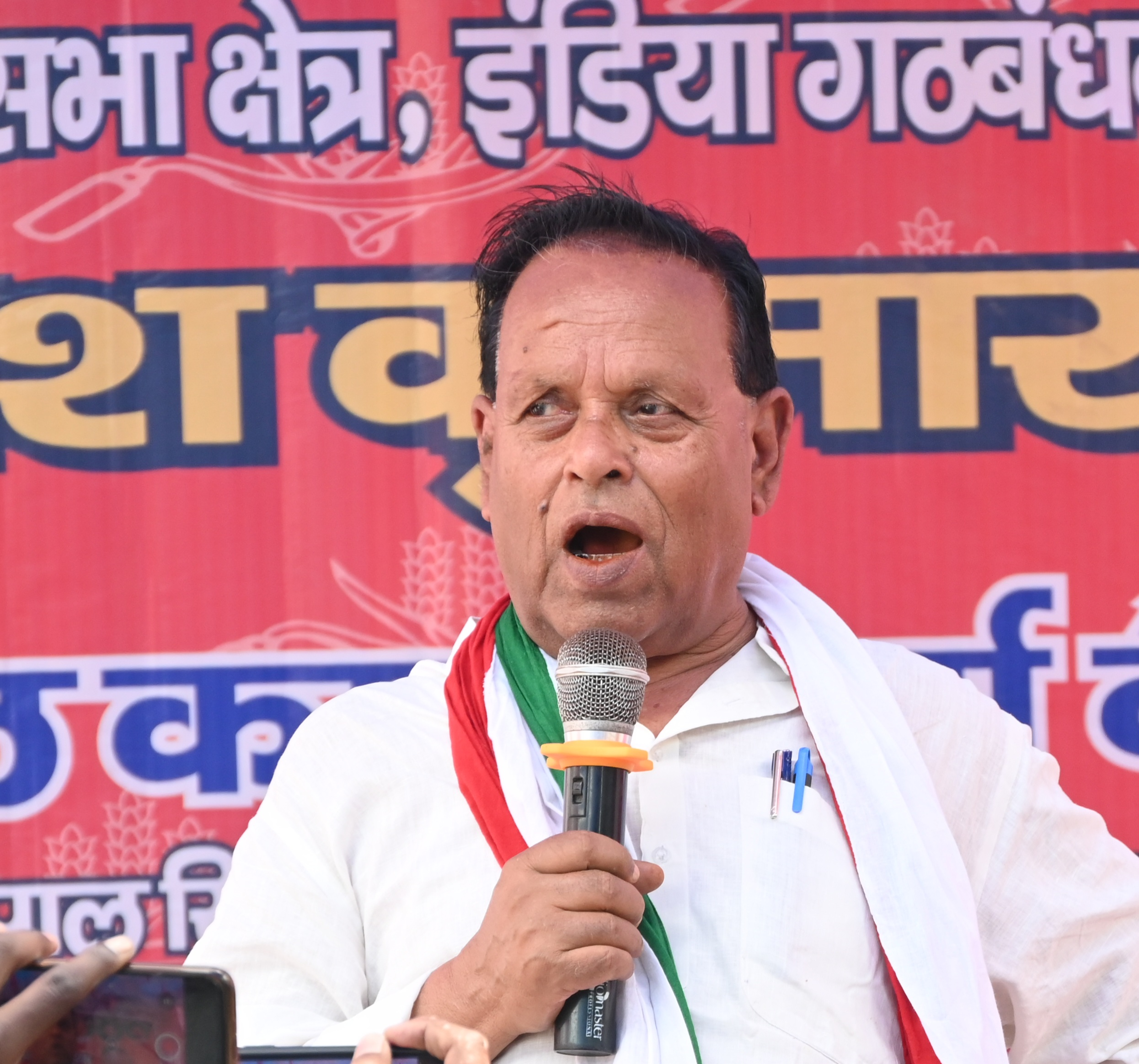
Awadhesh Kumar Rai addressing an election rally in Matihani, Begusarai as CPI candidate for Lok Sabha on 5 April 2024.

Awadhesh Kumar Rai (born c. 1952) is an Indian politician, affiliated to the Communist Party of India. Rai represented the Bachwara constituency in the Bihar Legislative Assembly 1990-2000. In the 2000 election, he lost the seat to Uttam Kumar Yadav of the Rashtriya Janata Dal by a narrow margin of 464 votes.

Rai finished in second place in the Bachwara seat in the two legislative elections of 2005. He regained the Bachwara seat in the 2010 election, being supported by the United Left Bloc alliance. He was the sole CPI legislator in Bihar during this tenure.
