= Bachhwara Assembly constituency =

Coordinates: 25°35′33″N 85°54′11″E

- Constituency No. 142 for the Bihar Legislative Assembly

Constituency details
- Country: India
- Region: East India
- State: Bihar
- District: Begusarai
- Lok Sabha constituency: Begusarai Lok Sabha
- Established: 1951
- Total electors: 312,121
- Reservation: None

Member of Legislative Assembly
- 18th Bihar Legislative Assembly
- Incumbent Surendra Mehta
- Party: BJP
- Alliance: NDA
- Elected year: 2025

Bachhwara Assembly constituency is an assembly constituency in Begusarai district in the Indian state of Bihar.

Most Successful parties from Bachwara Vidhan Sabha
1. INC (7 times) 43.75 (38.9%)
2. CPI (4 times) 25 (22.2%)
3. BJP(2 times) 12.5 (11.1%)
4. SSP (2 Times) 12.5 (11.1%)
5. Others (3 Times) 18.75 (16.7%)
6. 0 (0.00%)

== Overview ==
As per Delimitation of Parliamentary and Assembly constituencies Order, 2008, No. 142 Bachhwara Assembly constituency is composed of the following: Bachhwara, Mansoorchak and Bhagwanpur community development blocks.

Bachhwara Assembly constituency is part of No. 24 Begusarai (Lok Sabha constituency).

== Members of the Legislative Assembly ==
Year	Name	Party
1952	Mithan Choudhary	Indian National Congress
1957	Vaidyanath Prasad Singh	Praja Socialist Party
1962	Girish Kumar Singh	Indian National Congress
1967	Vaidyanath Prasad Singh	Samyukta Socialist Party
1969	Bhuvneshwar Rai	Indian National Congress
1972	Ramdeo Rai	Indian National Congress
1977	Ramdeo Rai	Indian National Congress
1980	Ramdeo Rai	Indian National Congress
1985	Ayodhya Prasad Singh	Communist Party of India
1990	Awadhesh Rai	Communist Party of India
1995	Awadhesh Rai	Communist Party of India
2000	Uttam Kumar Yadav	Rashtriya Janata Dal
2005	Ramdeo Rai	Independent politician
2005	Ramdeo Rai	Indian National Congress
2010	Awadhesh Rai	Communist Party of India
2015	Ramdeo Rai	Indian National Congress
2020	Surendra Mehta	Bharatiya Janata Party
2025	Surendra Mehta	Bharatiya Janata Party

== Election results ==
=== 2025 ===
2025 Bihar Legislative Assembly election: Bachhwara
Party	Candidate	Votes	%	±%
BJP	Surendra Mehata	100,343	45.03	▲14.82
INC	Shiv Prakash Garib Das	84,502	37.92	
CPI	Awadhesh Kumar Rai	21,588	9.69	▼20.25
JSP	Ramod Kumar	7,654	3.43	
Independent	Bipeen Kumar	2,383	1.07	
NOTA	None of the above	1,893	0.85	▲0.33
Majority		15,841	7.11	▲6.84
Turnout		222,847	71.4	▲10.53
BJP hold		Swing	NDA	

=== 2020 ===
2020 Bihar Legislative Assembly election: Bachhwara
Party	Candidate	Votes	%	±%
BJP	Surendra Mehata	54,738	30.21	
CPI	Awadhesh Kumar Rai	54,254	29.94	+12.26
Independent	Shiv Prakash Garib Das	39,878	22.01	
Independent	Indra Kumari	9,704	5.36	
Yuva Krantikari Party	Akhilesh Kumar	4,477	2.47	
Independent	Dular Chand Sahani	3,131	1.73	
Independent	Ram Naresh Yadav	2,972	1.64	
Rashtriya Jan Jan Party	Lipi Kumari	2,368	1.31	
Independent	Gautam Kumar	2,271	1.25	
NOTA	None of the above	945	0.52	−1.53
Majority		484	0.27	−22.61
Turnout		181,192	60.87	+1.48
BJP gain from INC		Swing	0.27	

=== 2015 ===
2015 Bihar Legislative Assembly election: Bachhwara constituency
Party	Candidate	Votes	%	±%
INC	Ramdeo Rai	73,983	45.83	
LJP	Arvind Kumar Singh	37,052	22.95	
CPI	Awadhesh Kumar Rai	28,539	17.68	
Independent	Subhash Kumar Ishwar	7,296	4.52	
Independent	Binay Kumar Singh	4,944	3.06	
JKNPP	Srimati Kundan Singh	1,816	1.12	
JAP(L)	Shweta Suman Yadav	1,460	0.9	
NOTA	None of the above	3,311	2.05	
Majority		36,931	22.88	
Turnout		161,440	59.39	
INC gain from CPI		Swing	23%	
