= Bhushan Lal Karihaloo =

British civil engineer

Bhushan Lal Karihaloo, FIEAus MASME FASCE FLSW (born September 1943, Srinagar, Kashmir), is a Kashmiri Pandit professor of civil, architectural, and environmental engineering. He is head of the Institute of Theoretical, Applied and Computational Mechanics at Cardiff University and an expert on fracture mechanics. In 2006 he was awarded the European Structural Integrity Society's Griffith Medal for "his outstanding research in the field of theoretical fracture mechanics and fracture of quasi-brittle materials, in particular of concrete, fibre-reinforced cementitious composites, and advanced tough ceramics". In 2012, he was elected a Fellow of the Learned Society of Wales.

== Books ==
Fracture Mechanics and Structural Concrete, Longman, 1995 (ISBN 0-582-21582-X)
