= Kundan Kumar =

Indian politician

Kundan Kumar (born 1978) is an Indian politician from Bihar. He is an MLA from Begusarai Assembly constituency in Begusarai district. He won the 2020 Bihar Legislative Assembly election representing the Bharatiya Janata Party.

== Early life and education ==
Kumar is from, Begusarai district, Bihar. He is the son of Upendra Prasad Singh. He completed his Post Graduate Programme in Management and Media in 2004 at the International School of Business and Media, Pune.

== Career ==
Kumar won from Begusarai Assembly constituency representing the Bharatiya Janata Party in the 2020 Bihar Legislative Assembly election. He polled 74,217 votes and defeated his nearest rival, Amita Bhushan of the Indian National Congress, by a margin of 4,554 votes.
