= Kalpavas =

Religious practices in Hinduism

- कल्पवास
- Type: Religious rituals
- Classification: Sanatana Hinduism
- Region: Indian subcontinent

Kalpavas (Sanskrit: कल्पवास) is a month-long spiritual tradition in Sanatan Dharma (Hinduism) that involves a period of deep spiritual practice, austerity, and detachment from worldly life, practiced by staying near the bank of a holy river. In Hindu scriptures, Kalpavas is said to be the combination of Sanyaas and Vanprastha Ashram.

== Etymology ==
Kalpavas is a combination of the Indic words Kalpa and Vas. The word 'Kalpa' means Refers to a long cycle of time, signifying an era or aeon in Hindu cosmology 'Vas' means dwelling or to stay. Thus the literal meaning of Kalpavas is to stay for a certain period of time. On this basis, Kalpavas, is said to remain on the banks of the Ganges for a certain period of time. The certain period of time is one month in general but according to capacity of devotees, it could be reduced to 5, 11 or 21 days.

== Features of Kalpavas ==
- Bathing in the Holy River: Daily early-morning baths in the sacred river are considered purifying for the body and soul.
- Meditation and Prayer: Devotees dedicate time to chanting mantras, reading scriptures, and meditating.
- Fasting: Simple sattvic meals (without onion, garlic, or rich spices) are consumed.
- Listening to Discourses: Saints and spiritual leaders deliver teachings on the Vedas, Upanishads, and other scriptures.
