= Mansurchak =

- city
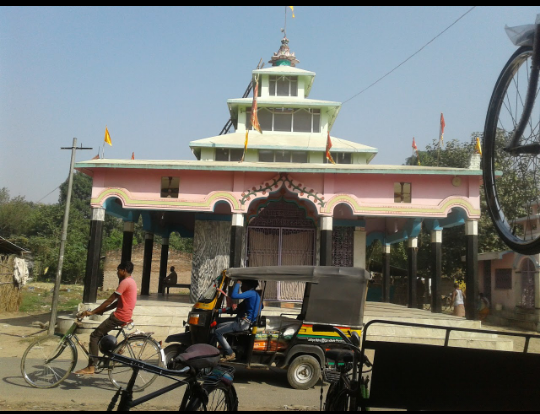

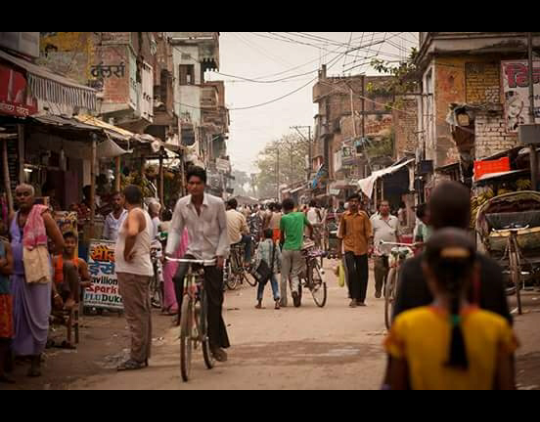
- Seal
- Interactive map of Mansurchak
- Location in Bihar, India Mansurchak (India)
- Coordinates (Mansurchak): 25.6253°N 85.9215°E
- Country: India
- State: Bihar
- District: Begusarai
- Block: Mansurchak

Government
  - MLA: Surender mehta (BJP)
  - MP: Giriraj Singh

Area^{†}
  - Total: 2 km^{2} (0.77 sq mi)
- Elevation: 49 m (161 ft)

Population (2011)
  - Total: 5,339
  - Density: 2,700/km^{2} (6,900/sq mi)
- Time zone: UTC+05:30 (IST)
- PIN: 851128
- Telephone code: 06278
- Vehicle registration: BR-09
- Sex ratio: 935
- Language: Hindi, Maithili, Urdu
- Additional language: English
- Website: begusarai.bih.nic.in

Mansurchak is a town in Mansurchak Block in Begusarai District of Bihar, India. It belongs to Munger division.

It is located 36km towards North from District headquarters Begusarai. It is a Block headquarter. Pincode 851128. It is situated at the bank of river Balan.

Mansur Chak Census Town has total administration over 1,086 houses to which it supplies basic amenities like water and sewerage. It is also authorized to build roads within Mansur Chak Census Town limits and impose taxes on properties coming under its jurisdiction.

Hawaspur East and Hawaspur west(1.5 km), Samsa ( 1 km ), Kastoli ( 2 km ), Arwa ( 5 km ), Mokhtiyarpur ( 6 km ), Satha ( 6 km ), Bachhawara ( 6 km ) Maskandargah(Approx 1 km)are the nearby Villages to Mansurchak.The occupation of the people here is agriculture, in which mainly vegetable production is high. Mansurchak is surrounded by Bachhwara Block towards South, Bhagwanpur Block towards South, Dalsinghsarai Block towards west, Bibhutpur Block towards North .The sculpture here is quite famous. Here Durgapuja, Krishnashtami festival is celebrated with great pomp and people come from far and wide to see it. Samsa, Pahadiya Chowk, Kali Sthan, Durga Sthan, Beach Bazar, Simmartalla Chowk, Phatak Chowk, Pethia Gachi and Block are all famous locations of Mansurchak from where the means of transport is available and the main market is also located here.

Dalsinghsarai, Rosera, Mokama are the nearest cities to Mansurchak.

Mansurchak borders the Begusarai District and Samastipur District. Vidyapati Nagar is west of this place.

== Geography ==
Mansurchak is a city situated in Begusarai district of Bihar which falls in India. The geographical coordinates i.e. latitude and longitude of Mansurchak is 25.6254 and 85.9215 respectively. Mansurchak observes Indian Standard Time. The currency code for Indian rupee is INR. The currency used in Mansurchak is Indian rupee.

== Demographics ==
Religion in Mansurchak city (2011)
| Religion | Percent |
| Hindus | 74.23% |
| Muslims | 25.68% |
| Others | 0.09% |

== Transport ==
=== Roadways ===
This town is situated on Dalsinghsarai to zero mile-malti road which links zero mile to city of Dalsinghsarai, Samastipur. It is also connected to Bachwara.

=== Railways ===
Bachwara Jn railway station is the nearest railway station from Mansurchak. The straight line distance from Mansurchak to Bachwara Jn railway station is around 5.3 kilometer. The nearest railway station and its distance from Mansurchak are follows.

Bachwara Jn railway station 5.3 km.

Sathajagat railway station 5.4 km.

Dalsingh Sarai railway station 9.1 km.

== Climate ==
Mansurchak summer highest day temperature is in between 29 °C to 45 °C. Average temperatures of January is 16 °C, February is 20 °C, March is 27 °C, April is 32 °C, May is 36 °C.

== Education ==
D. B. M. Inter College was established in 1981 and it is managed by the Department of Education. The school is taught in Hindi and consists of Grades from 11 to 12. The school is Co-educational and it doesn't have an attached pre-primary section.

10+2 high school

- N N SHINA 10+2
- 10+2 SBD Girls Higher Secondary School

CBSE Pattern

Modern Public School mansurchak

S D M Public School, Mansurchak

BSEB पटना Vats Science Classes डाकघर रोड मंसूरचक मोबाइल 7545826082

Fb.com/वत्स साइंस क्लासेस

== Hospital ==
Mansurchak Charitable Dispensary is the second largest government hospital in the Begusarai district in terms of maximum number of treated patients.

== Bank ==
UCO BANK

BIHAR GRAMIN BANK

SBI GRAHAK SEVA

== Politics ==
- INC
- JDU
- LJP
- RJD
- BJP
- CPI
- CPM

The major political parties in this area. Mansurchak block comes under Bachwara assembly constituency.
