= Begusarai =

City in Bihar, India

- City
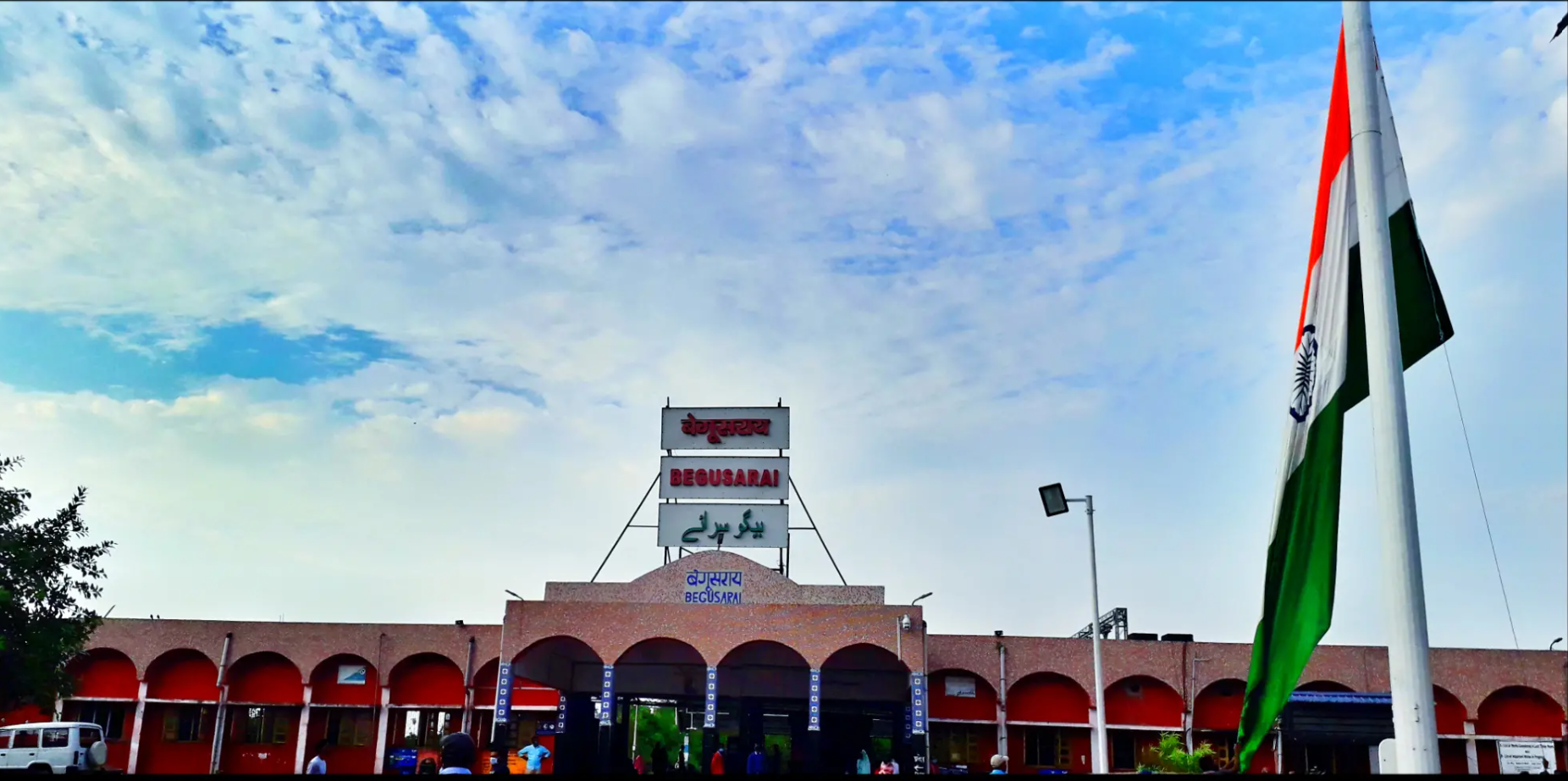
- Begusarai railway station
- Nicknames: Industrial Capital of Bihar
- Location of Begusarai in Bihar Begusarai (India)
- Coordinates: 25.42°N 86.13°E
- Country: India
- State: Bihar
- Region: Mithila
- District: Begusarai

Government
  - Type: Municipal Corporation
  - Body: Begusarai Municipal Corporation
  - MLA: Kundan Kumar (BJP)
  - Mayor: Pinki Devi
- Elevation: 41 m (135 ft)

Population (2011)
  - Total: 252,008

Language
  - Official: Hindi
  - Additional official: Urdu
  - Regional: Maithili (recognised under the Eighth Schedule of the Constitution of India)
- Time zone: UTC+5:30 (IST)
- PIN CODE: 851101
- Telephone code: 06243
- Vehicle registration: BR-09
- Sex ratio: 0.91 ♂/♀
- Lok Sabha constituency: Begusarai
- Vidhan Sabha constituency: Begusarai
- Website: begusarai.bih.nic.in

Begusarai is a city in the Indian state of Bihar and the administrative headquarters of the Begusarai district. The district lies on the northern bank of the river Ganges in the Mithila region of India.

Begusarai is home to Kanwar Lake Bird Sanctuary, an important wetland and a sanctuary for migrating birds. It has been declared a Ramsar Site, signifying its international importance. The city is known for its rich folk culture and local festivals, reflecting the traditions of Bihar. It is the cultural capital of Mithila.

== Etymology ==
The origin of the name Begusarai is subject to two primary etymological theories:

- Begu's Sarai: One theory posits that the name derives from a man named "Begu", a devotee of Bari Durga Maharani, who served as the caretaker of the town's historic marketplace, known as Sarai.
- Begum's Sarai: Alternatively, it is suggested that the name originates from the combination of "Begum" (queen) and "Sarai" (inn). This theory proposes that a "Begum" from Bhagalpur regularly undertook a month-long pilgrimage to Simaria Ghat on the Ganges River, and the location of her temporary residence became known as Begum's Sarai, eventually evolving into Begusarai.

== Geography ==
=== Topography ===
Begusarai is located at 25.42°N 86.13°E. It has an average elevation of 41 metres (134 feet). Begusarai lies in North Bihar and is surrounded by Khagaria in the northeast, Munger in the southeast, Patna in the west, and Samastipur in the northwest.

Begusarai lies in the middle of the mid-Ganga plain and generally has low-lying terrain with a south to south-easterly slope. Begusarai is basically divided into three floodplains: the Ganga floodplain, Burhi Gandak floodplain, Kareha-Bagmati floodplain.

=== Flora and fauna ===
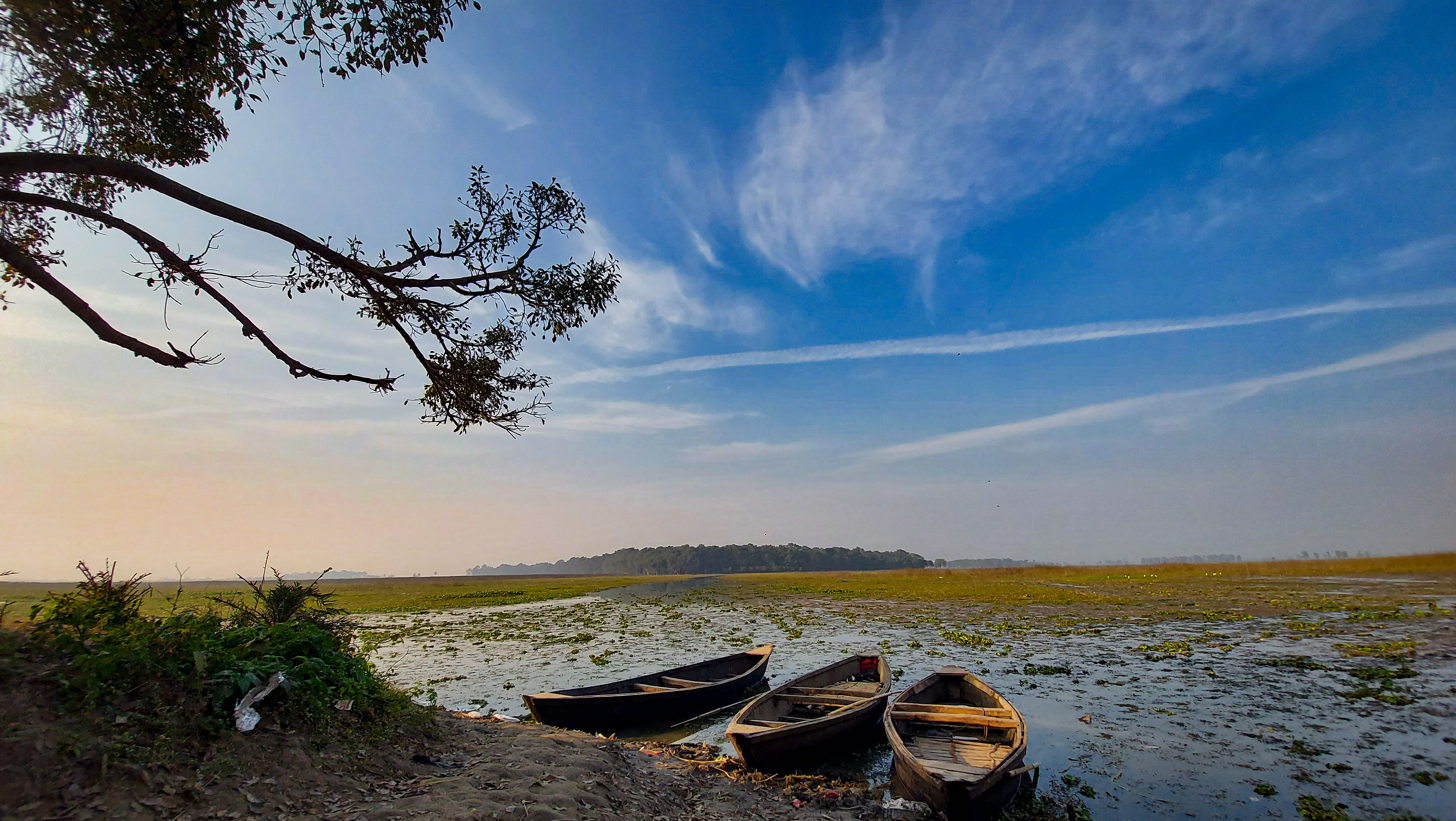
Kanwar Lake Begusarai, a Ramsar Convention Site wetland

In 1989, Begusarai district became home to the Kanwar jheel, or Kanwar Lake Bird Sanctuary, with an area of 63 km^{2} (24.3 mi^{2}).

=== Air pollution ===
Out of the top 10 polluted cities in the world in 2023, four were in Bihar and all were small cities. Among them, Begusarai turned out to be the world’s most polluted city, with an annual average PM2.5 level of 118.9 μg/m³, which is over 23 times higher than the WHO limit.

== Demographics ==
As per the 2011 census, Begusarai Municipal Corporation had a total population of 251,136, of whom 133,931 were male and 117,205 were female with a sex ratio of 875. The number of people under five years of age was 37,966. The literacy rate of people seven years and up was 79.35%.

=== Religion ===
Religion in Begusarai city (2011)
1. Hinduism (89.0%)
2. Islam (10.5%)
3. Others (0.50%)

Hinduism is the most followed religion in Begusarai city, with 224,282 followers (89%). Islam is second, with 26,531 Muslims (10.53%). Other religions include 325 Christians (0.13%), 134 Sikhs (0.05%), 31 Jains (0.01%), 29 Buddhists (0.01%), 14 other religions (0.01%), and 662 (0.26%) that did not answer.

== Government and politics ==
Begusarai has a rich and complex political history that has been shaped by caste dynamics, the rise of communist ideologies, and the growing influence of national parties like the Bharatiya Janata Party (BJP). Its political landscape reflects a combination of class struggles, ideological shifts, and the influence of powerful caste groups, especially the Bhumihars.

The political structure of Begusarai, like much of Bihar, has been deeply influenced by caste. In the early 20th century, the Bhumihar community—traditionally landowners and holders of political power—dominated the region.

Being one of the dominant castes in Bihar, the Bhumihars were crucial in local political affairs, controlling much of the land and thus influencing economic and political decisions. Their influence extended through their support for moderate political factions, including the Congress Party and later the JD(U), which focused on development and governance.

Caste, however, did not remain a static force. As Bihar moved through post-independence phases, political power began to shift toward more organized caste-based parties, with backward castes and Dalits increasingly finding their political voice. The Bhumihars, while still influential, had to navigate a more complex political system, especially as the region's working-class population began to seek greater representation.

Begusarai became a stronghold for the Communist Party of India [CPI] during the 1970s and 1980s, a period when leftist ideologies found resonance with the region’s agrarian population. The CPI capitalized on the discontent among landless peasants and the rural poor, offering an alternative to the established land-owning elites. The communists advocated for land reforms and social justice, aiming to redistribute land and wealth.

This appeal to the working class posed a challenge to the traditional power structures, which included the Bhumihars. Despite the CPI’s grassroots support among the poor and landless, the Bhumihars, as large landowners, often found themselves at odds with the party’s revolutionary stance. However, their influence meant that they could sometimes negotiate with or adapt to changing political winds, even in a district dominated by leftist ideologies.

In the late 1990s and 2000s, Nitish Kumar’s Janata Dal (United) [JD(U)] became a dominant force in Bihar, including Begusarai. Nitish Kumar’s rise coincided with a desire for political stability and development, which resonated with both urban and rural voters. JD(U)’s broader appeal to various caste groups, including backward castes, Dalits, and even some upper-caste groups like the Bhumihars, allowed the party to maintain a significant presence in the region.

However, even as Nitish Kumar’s JD(U) presented itself as a party focused on governance and development, caste-based politics still played a crucial role. The Bhumihars, while often aligned with JD(U), had their own interests that they balanced against the promises of the party. As a result, the region saw a complex political landscape where caste and ideology were constantly in flux, with different groups maneuvering to secure their influence.

The 2010s brought about a major shift in Begusarai’s political environment with the rise of the Bharatiya Janata Party (BJP), which capitalized on the growing influence of Hindu nationalism and the appeal of Narendra Modi’s leadership. In Begusarai, the BJP's message resonated especially with the upper castes, including the Bhumihars, who found its focus on national security and economic development appealing. The BJP, drawing on both Hindu identity politics and promises of economic growth, successfully attracted significant support in the region, marking the decline of the CPI and the rise of right-wing politics.

For the Bhumihars, who have historically been a key part of Bihar's political establishment, the BJP represented a new direction in alignment with their values. While still politically strategic, the Bhumihars now found themselves not only aligned with regional parties like JD(U) but also more prominently with national forces like the BJP. This shift showed the increasing role that caste politics still played, with the BJP drawing on its pro-Hindu, pro-development platform to garner support across a range of caste groups.

The political history of Begusarai is a reflection of Bihar’s broader political shifts, particularly in terms of caste-based power dynamics, the rise of left-wing politics, and the eventual prominence of Hindu nationalism. Over the decades, the Bhumihars have remained a central force, navigating the complex interplay between land ownership, political affiliation, and social standing. From their historic dominance to their more recent alliance with national parties like the BJP, the Bhumihars’ role in shaping Begusarai’s political landscape cannot be understated.

Today, Begusarai’s politics is a blend of caste-based calculations and national ideological shifts, with the Bhumihars continuing to play an essential role in determining electoral outcomes. The rise of the BJP has added a new dimension to the region's politics, but the influence of caste and the legacy of earlier political movements remain deeply embedded in the district’s political fabric.

== Economy ==
Shri Krishna Singh wanted to build an industrial corridor from Begusarai-Bakhtiyarpur-Fatuha, so he looked to construct Rajendra Setu in Mokama. Begusarai is one of the largest milk-consuming districts in India. Sudha dairy plant is also one of the biggest exporters of milk all over Bihar.

Agriculture is the mainstay of the economy. The main crops of the Begusarai district are oilseeds, anise seeds, tobacco, jutes, potatoes, red chilis, tomatoes, and rape-seeds. In fruits, Begusarai has recently become a major contributor in producing litchi, mango, guava, and banana. Basil leaves and pearl farming are also present in the local area.

Begusarai has an inactive airport in Begusarai Ulao. Begusarai had the second highest per capita income in the financial year of 2019–2020 in Bihar, after Patna.

== Culture ==
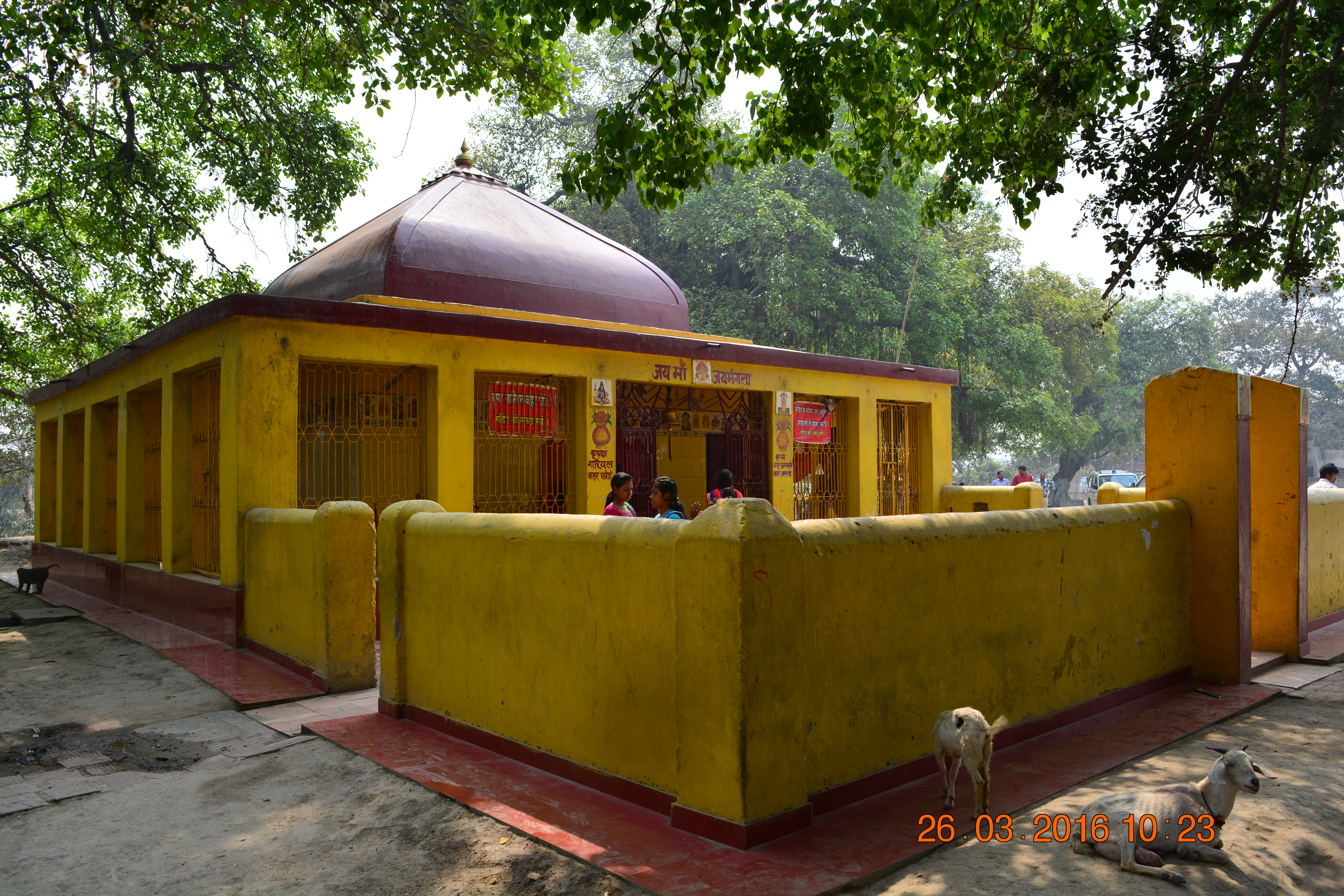
Jaimangla Gadh Temple an important cultural and religious site

The culture of Begusarai is the cultural heritage of Mithila. Begusarai is famous for Simaria, a fair of devotional significance every year usually during November in the month of Kartik, according to the Indian Panchang. Men and women in Begusarai dress for the festivals; the costumes of Begusarai stem from the traditional culture of Mithila. Panjabi Kurta and Dhoti have a Mithila Painting bordered Maroon coloured Gamchha, the Symbol of Passion, Love, Bravery, and Courage, are common clothing items for men. Men wear gold ring in their nose, which symbolizes prosperity, happiness, and wealth following Vishnu. They also wear Balla on their wrist. In ancient times, there was no colour option in Mithila, so the Maithil women wore white or yellow sari with a red border. Today, they wear Laal-Paara (the traditional red-boarded white or yellow sari) on some special occasions, as well as Shakha-Pola, with lahthi in their hand. In Mithila culture, this represents new beginnings, passion and prosperity.Red also represents the Hindu goddess Durga, a symbol of new beginnings and feminine power. During Chhaith, the women of Begusarai wear pure cotton dhoti without stitching which reflects the pure, traditional culture of Mithila. Usually crafted from pure cotton for daily use and from pure silk for more glamorous occasions, traditional attire for women of Begusarai includes Jamdani, Banorisi, and Bhagalpuri, among others. Many festivals are celebrated throughout the year in Begusarai, including Chhaith and Durga Puja.

=== Dance ===
Dhuno-Naach is the Cultural Dance of Begusarai, Mithila. Dhuno-Naach is performed in Begusarai, Samastipur, Khagaria, Katihar, and Naugachhia during Durga Puja and Kalipuja with Shankha-Dhaak Sounds and Jhijhiya is performed in Darbhanga, Muzaffarpur, Madhubani and their neighbour districts.

=== Painting ===
In Mithila, painting is a form of wall art and is practiced widely in Begusarai. The artform originated among the villages in Begusarai, Darbhanga, Naugachhia, and Madhubani, while more contemporary paintings known as Begusarai Art, Maduhubani art, Darbhanga Art, and Naugachhia Art are on paper and canvas.

=== Main festivals ===
Here is a list of the main festivals of Begusarai:

- Chhath: Prayers during Chhath puja are dedicated to the solar deity, Surya and her Sister Ranbay Maay(Chhathi Maiya), to show gratitude and thankfulness
- Saama-Chakeba: Includes folk theater and song, celebrates the love between brothers and sisters and is based on a legend recounted in the Puranas.
- Aghaniya Chhath: Very popular with the name of "Chhotka-Pabni" and Dopaharka Aragh in Mithila. Celebrated in Aghan Shukla-paksha Shasthi tithi.
- Baisakkha Chhath: This is celebrated in month of Baishakh Shukla-paksha Shasthi tithi and It is also called Chhotka-Pabni(Dopaharka Aragh) in Mithila.
- Chaurchan: Along with Lord Ganesha, Lord Vishnu, Goddess Parvati and the moon god is worshipped. The story of Charchanna Pabni is also heard on this day after that arghya is offered to the moon god (Chandra Deva).
- Jitiya: Celebrated mainly in entire Mithila and Nepal; mothers fast (without water) for wellbeing of their children.
- Vivaha Panchami: Hindu festival celebrating the wedding of Rama and Sita. It is observed on the fifth day of the Shukla paksha or waxing phase of moon in the Agrahayana month (November–December) as per Maithili calendar and in the month of Margashirsha in the Hindu calendar.
- Sita Navami
- Ganga Dussehra: Hindu festival celebrated by Maithils in Mokshdhaam Simaria Dhaam (The Welcome Gate of Mithila). avatarana (descent) of the Ganges. It is believed by Hindus that the holy river Ganges descended from heaven to earth on this day.
- Kalpwas: Celebrated in Every Kartik Month in Simaria Dhaam at Simaria Ghat, Begusarai.
- Lakshmi Puja: In Mithila, the night is known as Kojagari Purnima also called Lachhmi Puja. Kojagari translates to 'one who is awake' in Maithili. It is believed that Goddess Lachhmi visits people's houses on this night, checks whether they are staying awake, and blesses them only if they are awake. It is Harvest festival marking the end of monsoon season in Mithila.
- Durga Puja: A ten-day festival, of which the last five are of the most significance. It is an important festival in the Shaktism tradition of Hinduism. It marks the victory of goddess Durga in her battle against the shape-shifting asura, Mahishasura. (Note: In the Shakta tradition of Hinduism, many of the stories about obstacles and battles have been considered as metaphors for the divine and demonic within each human being, with liberation being the state of self-understanding whereby a virtuous nature & society emerging victorious over the vicious.) Thus, the festival epitomizes the victory of good over evil, though it is also in part a harvest festival celebrating the goddess as the motherly power behind all of life and creation.
- Kali Puja: Dedicated to the Hindu goddess Kali, celebrated on the new moon day Dipannita Omavasya of the Hindu month Kartik.
- Saraswati Puja: Marks the preparation for the arrival of spring. The festival is celebrated by people of Dharmic religions in the South Asian countries in different ways depending on the region. Vasant Panchami also marks the start of preparation for Holika and Holi, which take place forty days later.
- Rama Navami: Celebrates the descent of Vishnu as the Rama avatar, through his birth to King Dasharatha and Queen Kausalya in Ayodhya, Kosala.
- Basanti Puja (Chaiti Navratri)
- Til Sakraait
- Naag Ponchami
- Barsaait
- Vishwakarma Puja
- Holi: In Mithila, Holi starts from Sarsatti Puja(Bosant Ponchami) and ends on Phagun Purnima. Maithils Celebrated Holi for 40 Days. Also Offering Gulaal to Shiva and Gauri on Moha Shivratri.
- Poos Kalipuja: Celebrated on Poos Omabasya in Mithila.
- Maha Shivratri: Maithil celebrates Moha Shivaratri in Phagun and Saavan Maas.

== Education ==
Colleges:

- Rashtrakavi Ramdhari Singh Dinkar College of_Engineering (A government engineering college)
- Ganesh Dutt College (Affiliated with Lalit Narayan Mithila University)
- Shree Krishna Mahila College (A women's college in Begusarai)
- RCS College
- BP Inter College Begusarai (Inter college level education)

Schools:

- Doon Public School
- BR DAV Public School, Begusarai
- St. Joseph Public School, Begusarai
- St. Paul's School, Begusarai
- Kendriya Vidyalaya, Begusarai
- St. Jude's Vidyalaya
- Mount Litera Zee School, Begusarai
- Delhi Public School, Begusarai
- Sarvoday Vidyalaya Begusarai
- Carmel School Begusarai

== Notable people ==
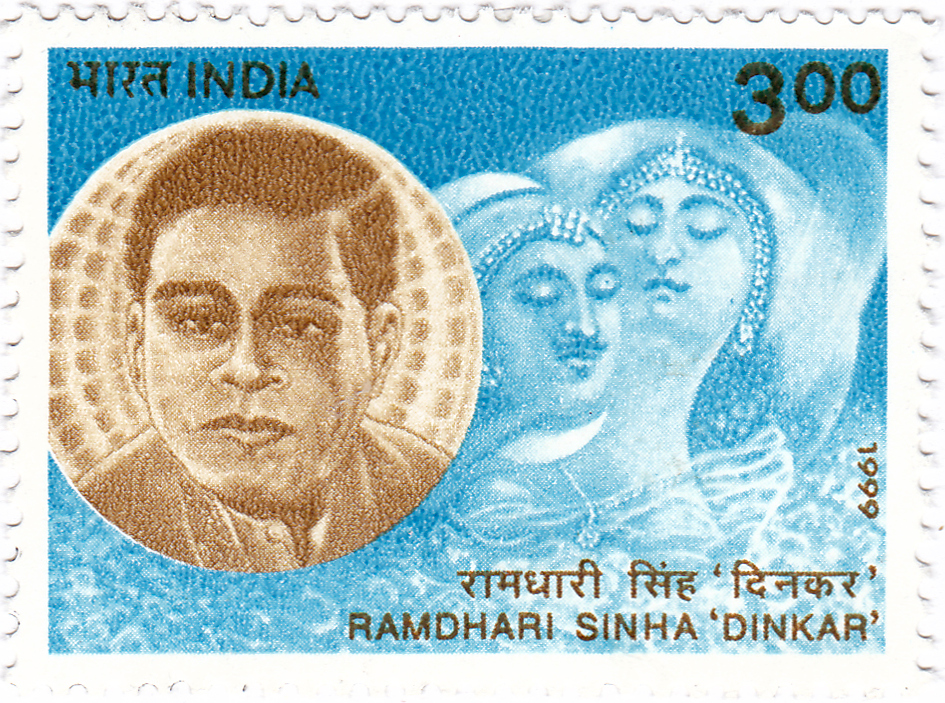
Ramdhari Singh Dinkar

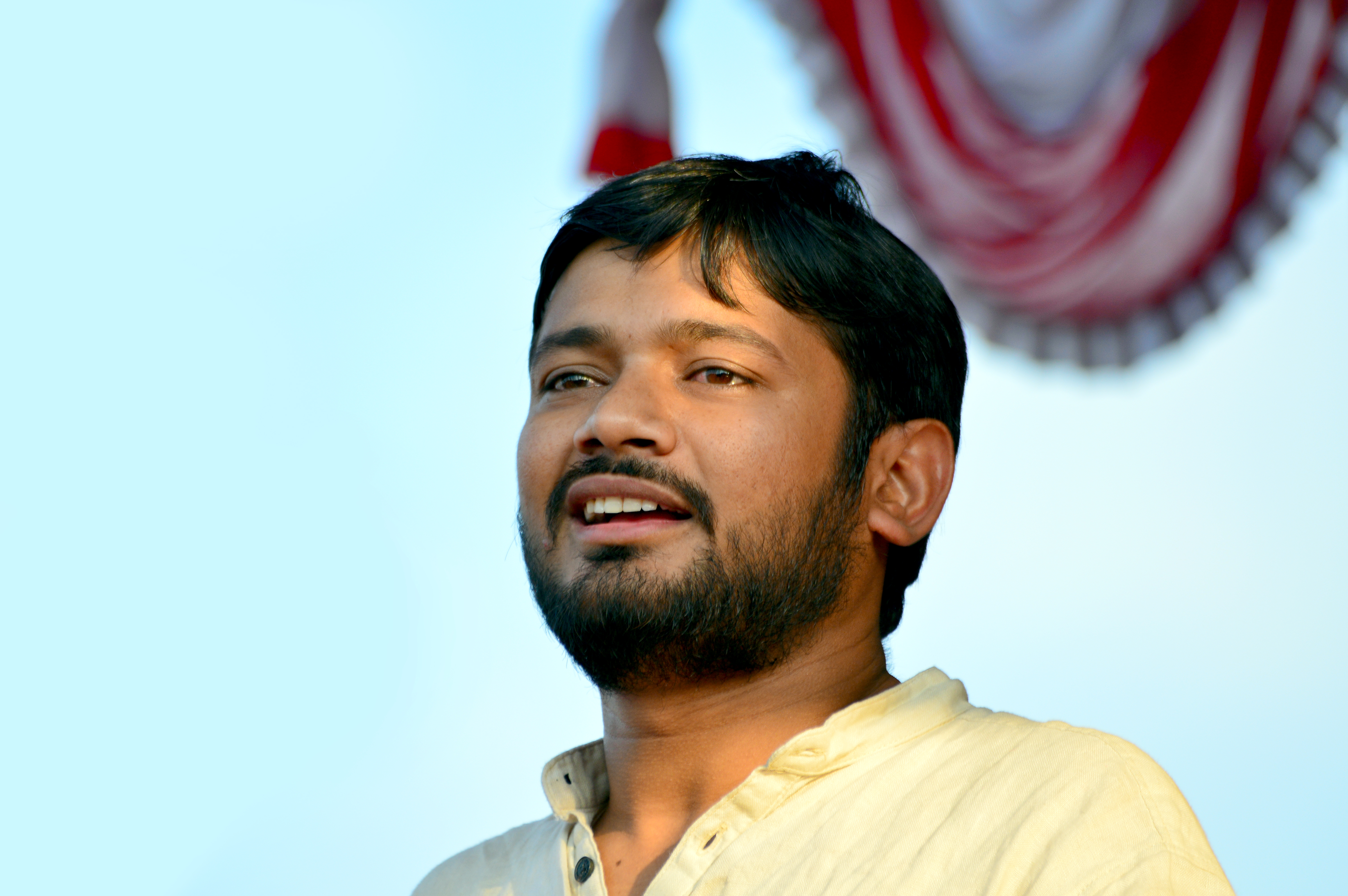
Kanhaiya Kumar

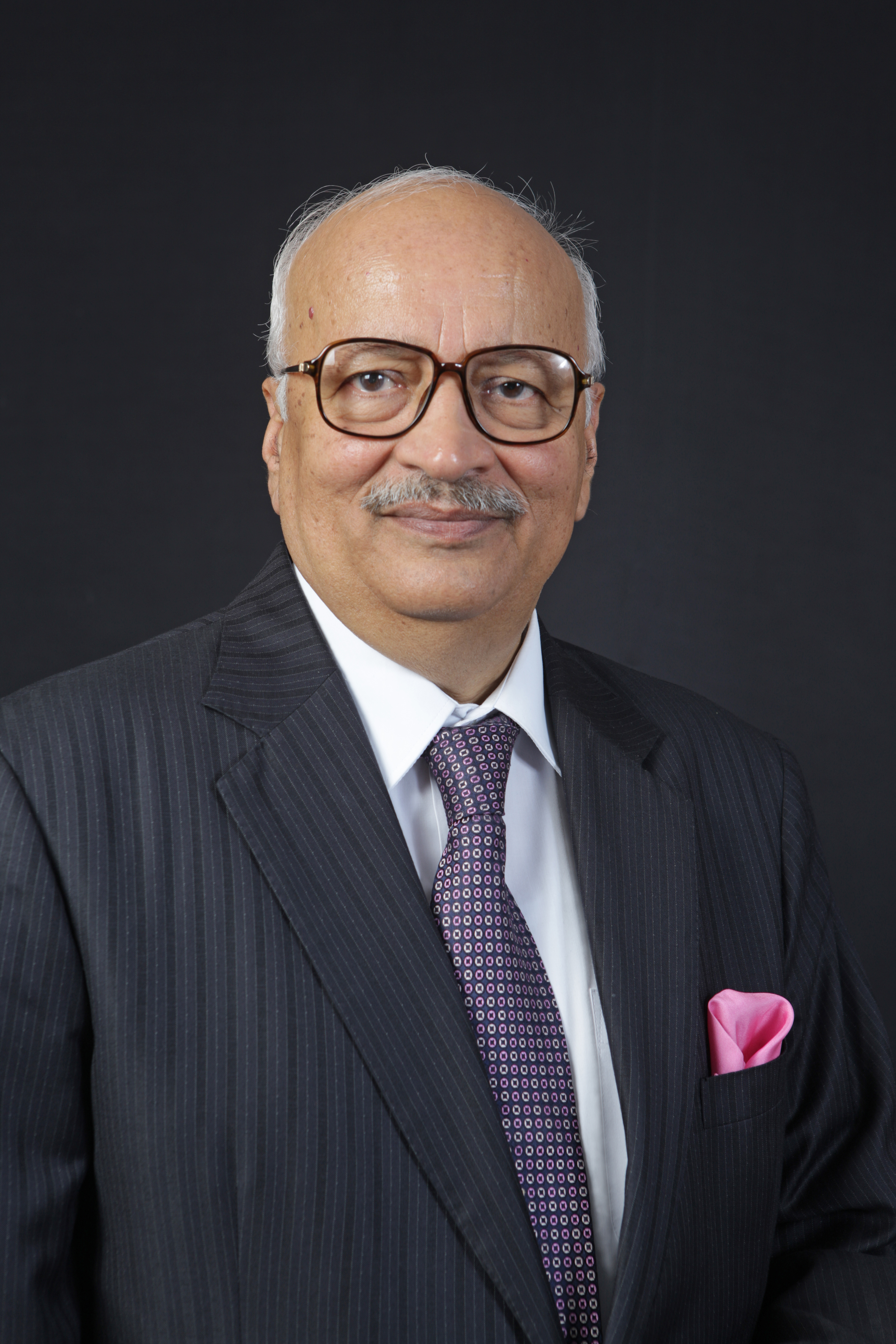
Balmiki Prasad Singh

- Ajit Anjum, journalist
- Radha Krishna Choudhary, Indian historian, thinker, and writer
- Shaibal Gupta, Indian social scientist and political economist, Padma Shri receiver, founder of Asian Development Research Institute
- Kranti Prakash Jha, actor, model
- Sriti Jha, actress
- Ramendra Kumar, National President of AITUC
- Manoj Kumar Mishra, known for his work on Quantum chemistry
- Mathura Prasad Mishra, member of 1st Lok Sabha,2nd Lok Sabha and 3rd Lok Sabha
- Shyam Nandan Prasad Mishra, Minister of External Affairs (India)
- Kajal Raghwani, one of the highest paid Bhojpuri actress
- Rafiuddin Raz, Pakistani poet
- Krishna Sahi, State Minister of Education (India), Minister of Water Resources, River Development and Ganga Rejuvenation, Minister of Commerce and Industry (India), Minister of Heavy Industries, Minister of Consumer Affairs, Food and Public Distribution
- Balmiki Prasad Singh, writer, former IAS officer, former Governor of Sikkim
- Bhola Singh, politician
- Lalit Vijay Singh, State Minister of Defence (India)

== See also ==
- Mithila (proposed Indian state)
- Simaria
- Mithila State Movement
